= FIL World Luge Championships =

Luge Federation events

- Status: active
- Genre: sports event
- Date: January–February
- Frequency: annual
- Location: various
- Inaugurated: 1955
- Organiser: FIL
- 2025 FIL World Luge Championships

The FIL World Luge Championships, part of the International Luge Federation (FIL) have taken place on an almost annual basis in non-Winter Olympics years since 1955. These championships are shown for artificial tracks. See FIL World Luge Natural Track Championships for all natural track events that have taken place since 1979.

== Host cities ==
- 1955: Oslo, Norway
- 1956: Event cancelled
- 1957: Davos, Switzerland
- 1958: Krynica, Poland
- 1959: Villard-de-Lans, France
- 1960: Garmisch-Partenkirchen, West Germany
- 1961: Girenbad, Switzerland
- 1962: Krynica, Poland
- 1963: Imst, Austria
- 1965: Davos, Switzerland
- 1966: Friedrichroda, East Germany (cancelled)
- 1967: Hammarstrand, Sweden
- 1969: Königssee, West Germany
- 1970: Königssee, West Germany
- 1971: Olang, Italy
- 1973: Oberhof, East Germany
- 1974: Königssee, West Germany
- 1975: Hammarstrand, Sweden
- 1977: Innsbruck, Austria
- 1978: Imst, Austria
- 1979: Königssee, West Germany
- 1981: Hammarstrand, Sweden
- 1983: Lake Placid, United States
- 1985: Oberhof, East Germany
- 1987: Innsbruck, Austria
- 1989: Winterberg, West Germany
- 1990: Calgary, Canada
- 1991: Winterberg, Germany
- 1993: Calgary, Canada
- 1995: Lillehammer, Norway
- 1996: Altenberg, Germany
- 1997: Innsbruck, Austria
- 1999: Königssee, Germany
- 2000: St. Moritz, Switzerland
- 2001: Calgary, Canada
- 2003: Sigulda, Latvia
- 2004: Nagano, Japan
- 2005: Park City, United States
- 2007: Innsbruck, Austria
- 2008: Oberhof, Germany
- 2009: Lake Placid, United States
- 2011: Cesana, Italy
- 2012: Altenberg, Germany
- 2013: Whistler, Canada
- 2015: Sigulda, Latvia
- 2016: Königssee, Germany
- 2017: Innsbruck, Austria
- 2019: Winterberg, Germany
- 2020: Sochi, Russia
- 2021: Königssee, Germany (Originally awarded to Calgary and then to Whistler, Canada)
- 2022: Winterberg, Germany (only women's doubles)
- 2023: Oberhof, Germany
- 2024: Altenberg, Germany
- 2025: Whistler, Canada

== Medal winners ==
Numbers in brackets denotes number of victories in corresponding disciplines. Boldface denotes record number of victories.

=== Men's singles ===
Debuted: 1955.

Season	Winner	Runner-up	Third
1955 Oslo	Anton Salvesen (NOR)	Josef Thaler (AUT)	Josef Isser (AUT)
1957 Davos	Hans Schaller (FRG)	Bibi Torriani (SUI)	Errich Raffl (AUT)
1958 Krynica	Jerzy Wojnar (POL)	Ryszard Pędrak-Janowicz (POL)	Reinhold Frosch (AUT)
1959 Villard-de-Lans	Herbert Thaler (AUT)	Josef Feistmantl (AUT)	David Moroder (ITA)
1960 Garmisch-Partenkirchen	Helmut Berndt (FRG)	Reinhold Frosch (AUT)	Hans Plenk (FRG)
1961 Girenbad	Jerzy Wojnar (POL) (2)	Hans Plenk (FRG)	Reinhold Senn (AUT)
1962 Krynica	Thomas Köhler (GDR)	Jerzy Wojnar (POL)	Jochen Asche (GDR)
1963 Imst	Fritz Nachmann (FRG)	Hans Plenk (FRG)	Klaus Bonsack (GDR)
1965 Davos	Hans Plenk (FRG)	Mieczysław Pawełkiewicz (POL)	Erich Graber (ITA)
1967 Hammarstrand	Thomas Köhler (GDR) (2)	Klaus Bonsack (GDR)	Josef Feistmantl (AUT)
1969 Königssee	Josef Feistmantl (AUT)	Manfred Schmid (AUT)	Wolfgang Scheidel (GDR)
1970 Königssee	Josef Fendt (FRG)	Josef Feistmantl (AUT)	Wolfgang Scheidel (GDR)
1971 Olang	Karl Brunner (ITA)	Leonhard Nagenrauft (FRG)	Josef Feistmantl (AUT)
1973 Oberhof	Hans Rinn (GDR)	Wolfram Fiedler (GDR)	Harald Ehrig (GDR)
1974 Königssee	Josef Fendt (FRG) (2)	Hans Rinn (GDR)	Horst Müller (GDR)
1975 Hammarstrand	Wolfram Fiedler (GDR)	Manfred Schmid (AUT)	Harald Ehrig (GDR)
1977 Innsbruck	Hans Rinn (GDR) (2)	Horst Müller (GDR)	Anton Winkler (FRG)
1978 Imst	Paul Hildgartner (ITA)	Anton Winkler (FRG)	Manfred Schmid (AUT)
1979 Königssee	Dettlef Günther (GDR)	Karl Brunner (ITA)	Paul Hildgartner (ITA)
1981 Hammarstrand	Sergey Danilin (URS)	Michael Walter (GDR)	Ernst Haspinger (ITA)
1983 Lake Placid	Miroslav Zajonc (CAN)	Sergey Danilin (URS)	Paul Hildgartner (ITA)
1985 Oberhof	Michael Walter (GDR)	Jörg Hoffmann (GDR)	Jens Müller (GDR)
1987 Innsbruck	Markus Prock (AUT)	Jens Müller (GDR)	Sergey Danilin (URS)
1989 Winterberg	Georg Hackl (FRG)	Jens Müller (GDR)	Johannes Schettel (FRG)
1990 Calgary	Georg Hackl (FRG)	Markus Prock (AUT)	Jens Müller (GDR)
1991 Winterberg	Arnold Huber (ITA)	Georg Hackl (GER)	Markus Prock (AUT)
1993 Calgary	Wendel Suckow (USA)	Georg Hackl (GER)	Wilfried Huber (ITA)
1995 Lillehammer	Armin Zöggeler (ITA)	Georg Hackl (GER)	Markus Prock (AUT)
1996 Altenberg	Markus Prock (AUT) (2)	Georg Hackl (GER)	Jens Müller (GER)
1997 Innsbruck	Georg Hackl (GER) (3)	Markus Prock (AUT)	Gerhard Gleirscher (AUT)
1999 Königssee	Armin Zöggeler (ITA)	Jens Müller (GER)	Norbert Huber (ITA)
2000 St.Moritz	Jens Müller (GER)	Armin Zöggeler (ITA)	Georg Hackl (GER)
2001 Calgary	Armin Zöggeler (ITA)	Georg Hackl (GER)	Markus Prock (AUT)
2003 Sigulda	Armin Zöggeler (ITA)	Mārtiņš Rubenis (LAT)	Reiner Margreiter (AUT)
2004 Nagano	David Möller (GER)	Georg Hackl (GER)	Mārtiņš Rubenis (LAT)
2005 Park City	Armin Zöggeler (ITA)	Georg Hackl (GER)	David Möller (GER)
2007 Innsbruck	David Möller (GER) (2)	Armin Zöggeler (ITA)	Jan Eichhorn (GER)
2008 Oberhof	Felix Loch (GER)	David Möller (GER)	Andi Langenhan (GER)
2009 Lake Placid	Felix Loch (GER)	Armin Zöggeler (ITA)	Daniel Pfister (AUT)
2011 Cesana	Armin Zöggeler (ITA) **(6)**	Felix Loch (GER)	Andi Langenhan (GER)
2012 Altenberg	Felix Loch (GER)	Albert Demchenko (RUS)	Armin Zöggeler (ITA)
2013 Whistler	Felix Loch (GER)	Andi Langenhan (GER)	Johannes Ludwig (GER)
2015 Sigulda	Semen Pavlichenko (RUS)	Felix Loch (GER)	Wolfgang Kindl (AUT)
2016 Königssee	Felix Loch (GER)	Ralf Palik (GER)	Wolfgang Kindl (AUT)
2017 Innsbruck	Wolfgang Kindl (AUT)	Roman Repilov (RUS)	Dominik Fischnaller (ITA)
2019 Winterberg	Felix Loch (GER) **(6)**	Reinhard Egger (AUT)	Semen Pavlichenko (RUS)
2020 Sochi	Roman Repilov (RUS)	Jonas Müller (AUT)	Wolfgang Kindl (AUT)
2021 Königssee	Roman Repilov (RLF) (2)	Felix Loch (GER)	David Gleirscher (AUT)
2023 Oberhof	Jonas Müller (AUT)	Max Langenhan (GER)	David Gleirscher (AUT)
2024 Altenberg	Max Langenhan (GER)	Nico Gleirscher (AUT)	Felix Loch (GER)
2025 Whistler	Max Langenhan (GER) (2)	Felix Loch (GER)	Nico Gleirscher (AUT)

Medal table

Rank	Nation	Gold	Silver	Bronze	Total
1	Germany	12	16	8	36
2	Italy	9	4	9	22
3	West Germany	8	4	3	15
4	East Germany	7	8	9	24
5	Austria	6	11	19	36
6	Poland	2	3	0	5
7	Russia	2	2	1	5
8	Soviet Union	1	1	1	3
9	Canada	1	0	0	1
9	Norway	1	0	0	1
9	Russian Luge Federation	1	0	0	1
9	United States	1	0	0	1
13	Latvia	0	1	1	2
14	Switzerland	0	1	0	1
Totals (14 entries)		**51**	**51**	**51**	**153**

=== Women's singles ===
Debuted: 1955.

Season	Winner	Runner-up	Third
1955 Oslo	Karla Kienzl (AUT)	Maria Isser (AUT)	Marianne Bauer (FRG)
1957 Davos	Maria Isser (AUT)	Helga Müller (FRG)	Brigitte Fink (ITA)
1958 Krynica	Maria Semczyszak (POL)	Helena Boettcher (POL)	Barbara Gorgoń (POL)
1959 Villard-de-Lans	Elly Lieber (AUT)	Maria Isser (AUT)	Agnes Neururer (AUT)
1960 Garmisch-Partenkirchen	Maria Isser (AUT) (2)	Hannelore Possmoser (AUT)	Erika Leitner (ITA)
1961 Girenbad	Elisabeth Nagele (SUI)	Marianne Winkler (FRG)	Helene Thurner (AUT)
1962 Krynica	Ilse Geisler (GDR)	Gerda Rieser-Cegnar (AUT)	Danuta Nycz (POL)
1963 Imst	Ilse Geisler (GDR) (2)	Helene Thurner (AUT)	Janina Susczewska (POL)
1965 Davos	Ortrun Enderlein (GDR)	Petra Tierlich (GDR)	Ilse Geisler (GDR)
1967 Hammarstrand	Ortrun Enderlein (GDR) (2)	Petra Tierlich (GDR)	Helene Thurner (AUT)
1969 Königssee	Petra Tierlich (GDR)	Anna-Maria Müller (GDR)	Christa Schmuck (FRG)
1970 Königssee	Barbara Piecha (POL)	Christa Schmuck (FRG)	Elisabeth Demleitner (FRG)
1971 Olang	Elisabeth Demleitner (FRG)	Erica Lechner (ITA)	Barbara Piecha (POL)
1973 Oberhof	Margit Schumann (GDR)	Ute Rührold (GDR)	Eva-Maria Wernicke (GDR)
1974 Königssee	Margit Schumann (GDR)	Elisabeth Demleitner (FRG)	Ute Rührold (GDR)
1975 Hammarstrand	Margit Schumann (GDR)	Ute Rührold (GDR)	Dana Spálenská (TCH)
1977 Innsbruck	Margit Schumann (GDR) (4)	Vera Zozulya (URS)	Margit Graf (AUT)
1978 Imst	Vera Zozulya (URS)	Andrea Fendt (FRG)	Angelika Schafferer (AUT)
1979 Königssee	Melitta Sollmann (GDR)	Elisabeth Demleitner (FRG)	Marie-Luise Rainer (ITA)
1981 Hammarstrand	Melitta Sollmann (GDR) (2)	Cerstin Schmidt (GDR)	Vera Zozulya (URS)
1983 Lake Placid	Steffi Martin (GDR)	Melitta Sollmann (GDR)	Ute Weiß (GDR)
1985 Oberhof	Steffi Martin (GDR) (2)	Cerstin Schmidt (GDR)	Birgit Weise (GDR)
1987 Innsbruck	Cerstin Schmidt (GDR)	Gabriele Kohlisch (GDR)	Ute Oberhoffner (GDR)
1989 Winterberg	Susi Erdmann (GDR)	Gerda Weissensteiner (ITA)	Ute Oberhoffner (GDR)
1990 Calgary	Gabriele Kohlisch (GDR)	Yuliya Antipova (URS)	Jana Bode (FRG)
1991 Winterberg	Susi Erdmann (GER)	Gabriele Kohlisch (GER)	Jana Bode (GER)
1993 Calgary	Gerda Weissensteiner (ITA)	Gabriele Kohlisch (GER)	Doris Neuner (AUT)
1995 Lillehammer	Gabriele Kohlisch (GER) (2)	Susi Erdmann (GER)	Gerda Weissensteiner (ITA)
1996 Altenberg	Jana Bode (GER)	Susi Erdmann (GER)	Gerda Weissensteiner (ITA)
1997 Innsbruck	Susi Erdmann (GER) (3)	Jana Bode (GER)	Angelika Neuner (AUT)
1999 Königssee	Sonja Wiedemann (GER)	Barbara Niedernhuber (GER)	Sylke Otto (GER)
2000 St.Moritz	Sylke Otto (GER)	Barbara Niedernhuber (GER)	Sonja Wiedemann (GER)
2001 Calgary	Sylke Otto (GER)	Silke Kraushaar (GER)	Barbara Niedernhuber (GER)
2003 Sigulda	Sylke Otto (GER)	Silke Kraushaar (GER)	Barbara Niedernhuber (GER)
2004 Nagano	Silke Kraushaar (GER)	Barbara Niedernhuber (GER)	Sylke Otto (GER)
2005 Park City	Sylke Otto (GER) (4)	Barbara Niedernhuber (GER)	Anke Wischnewski (GER)
2007 Innsbruck	Tatjana Hüfner (GER)	Anke Wischnewski (GER)	Silke Kraushaar-Pielach (GER)
2008 Oberhof	Tatjana Hüfner (GER)	Natalie Geisenberger (GER)	Silke Kraushaar-Pielach (GER)
2009 Lake Placid	Erin Hamlin (USA)	Natalie Geisenberger (GER)	Natalia Yakushenko (UKR)
2011 Cesana	Tatjana Hüfner (GER)	Natalie Geisenberger (GER)	Alex Gough (CAN)
2012 Altenberg	Tatjana Hüfner (GER)	Tatiana Ivanova (RUS)	Natalie Geisenberger (GER)
2013 Whistler	Natalie Geisenberger (GER)	Tatjana Hüfner (GER)	Alex Gough (CAN)
2015 Sigulda	Natalie Geisenberger (GER)	Tatiana Ivanova (RUS)	Tatjana Hüfner (GER)
2016 Königssee	Natalie Geisenberger (GER)	Martina Kocher (SUI)	Tatiana Ivanova (RUS)
2017 Innsbruck	Tatjana Hüfner (GER) **(5)**	Erin Hamlin (USA)	Kimberley McRae (CAN)
2019 Winterberg	Natalie Geisenberger (GER) (4)	Julia Taubitz (GER)	Emily Sweeney (USA)
2020 Sochi	Ekaterina Katnikova (RUS)	Julia Taubitz (GER)	Victoria Demchenko (RUS)
2021 Königssee	Julia Taubitz (GER)	Natalie Geisenberger (GER)	Dajana Eitberger (GER)
2023 Oberhof	Anna Berreiter (GER)	Julia Taubitz (GER)	Dajana Eitberger (GER)
2024 Altenberg	Lisa Schulte (AUT)	Julia Taubitz (GER)	Madeleine Egle (AUT)
2025 Whistler	Julia Taubitz (GER) (2)	Merle Fräbel (GER)	Emily Sweeney (USA)

Medal table

Rank	Nation	Gold	Silver	Bronze	Total
1	Germany	22	22	13	57
2	East Germany	16	9	7	32
3	Austria	5	5	8	18
4	Poland	2	1	4	7
5	West Germany	1	6	4	11
6	Italy	1	2	5	8
7	Russia	1	2	2	5
8	Soviet Union	1	2	1	4
9	United States	1	1	2	4
10	Switzerland	1	1	0	2
11	Canada	0	0	3	3
12	Czechoslovakia	0	0	1	1
12	Ukraine	0	0	1	1
Totals (13 entries)		**51**	**51**	**51**	**153**

=== Men's doubles ===
Debuted: 1955 as open event to men and women. Cancelled due to weather conditions: 1959. Changed to men's doubles: 2023.

Season	Winner	Runner-up	Third
1955 Oslo	Hans Krausner; Josef Thaler; Austria	Josef Isser; Maria Isser; Austria	Josef Strillinger; Fritz Nachmann; West Germany
1957 Davos	Fritz Nachmann; Josef Strillinger; West Germany	Giorgio Pichler; Giovanni Graber; Italy	Erich Raffl; Ewald Walch; Austria
1958 Krynica	Fritz Nachmann (2); Josef Strillinger (2); West Germany	Jerzy Koszla; Janina Susczewska; Poland	Ryszard Pędrak-Janowicz; Halina Lacheta; Poland
1960 Garmisch-Partenkirchen	Reinhold Frosch; Ewald Walch; Austria	Herbert Thaler; Helmut Thaler; Austria	Horst Tiedge; Hans Plenk; West Germany
1961 Girenbad	Roman Pichler; Enrico Prinot; Italy	David Moroder; Raimondo Prinot; Italy	Helmut Thaler; Reinhold Senn; Austria
1962 Krynica	Giovanni Graber; Gianpaolo Ambrosi; Italy	Fritz Nachmann; Max Leo; West Germany	Manfred Novotný; Petr Škrabálek; Czechoslovakia
1963 Imst	Ryszard Pędrak-Janowicz; Lucjan Kudzia; Poland	Edward Fender; Mieczysław Pawełkiewicz; Poland	Anton Venier; Ewald Walch; Austria
1965 Davos	Wolfgang Scheidel; Michael Köhler; East Germany	Klaus Bonsack; Thomas Köhler; East Germany	Horst Hörnlein; Rolf Fuchs; East Germany
1967 Hammarstrand	Klaus Bonsack; Thomas Köhler; East Germany	Manfred Schmid; Ewald Walch; Austria	Siegfried Maier; Ernesto Maier; Italy
1969 Königssee	Manfred Schmid; Ewald Walch; Austria	Horst Hörnlein; Reinhard Bredow; East Germany	Klaus Bonsack; Michael Köhler; East Germany
1970 Königssee	Manfred Schmid (2); Ewald Walch (3); Austria	Klaus Bonsack; Michael Köhler; East Germany	Horst Hörnlein; Reinhard Bredow; East Germany
1971 Olang	Paul Hildgartner; Walter Plaikner; Italy	Manfred Schmid; Ewald Walch; Austria	Horst Hörnlein; Reinhard Bredow; East Germany
1973 Oberhof	Horst Hörnlein; Reinhard Bredow; East Germany	Hans Rinn; Norbert Hahn; East Germany	Paul Hildgartner; Walter Plaikner; Italy
1974 Königssee	Bernd Hahn; Ulrich Hahn; East Germany	Henning Schulze; Hans-Jörg Neumann; East Germany	Rudolf Schmid; Franz Schachner; Austria
1975 Hammarstrand	Hans Rinn; Norbert Hahn; East Germany	Horst Müller; Hans-Jörg Neumann; East Germany	Rudolf Schmid; Franz Schachner; Austria
1977 Innsbruck	Hans Rinn (2); Norbert Hahn (2); East Germany	Karl Brunner; Peter Gschnitzer; Italy	Hans Brandner; Balthasar Schwarm; West Germany
1978 Imst	Dainis Bremze; Aigars Kriķis; Soviet Union	Valeriy Yakushin; Vladimir Shitov; Soviet Union	Hans Rinn; Norbert Hahn; East Germany
1979 Königssee	Hans Brandner; Balthasar Schwarm; West Germany	Hans Rinn; Norbert Hahn; East Germany	Anton Winkler; Franz Wembacher; West Germany
1981 Hammarstrand	Bernd Hahn (2); Ulrich Hahn (2); East Germany	Bernd Oberhoffner; Jörg-Dieter Ludwig; East Germany	Hans Stangassinger; Franz Wembacher; West Germany
1983 Lake Placid	Jörg Hoffmann; Jochen Pietzsch; East Germany	Hansjörg Raffl; Norbert Huber; Italy	Hans Stangassinger; Franz Wembacher; West Germany
1985 Oberhof	Jörg Hoffmann; Jochen Pietzsch; East Germany	René Keller; Lutz Kühnlenz; East Germany	Vitaliy Melnik; Dmitriy Alekseyev; Soviet Union
1987 Innsbruck	Jörg Hoffmann (3); Jochen Pietzsch (3); East Germany	Stefan Ilsanker; Georg Hackl; West Germany	Thomas Schwab; Wolfgang Staudinger; West Germany
1989 Winterberg	Stefan Krauße; Jan Behrendt; East Germany	Hansjörg Raffl; Norbert Huber; Italy	Jörg Hoffmann; Jochen Pietzsch; East Germany
1990 Calgary	Hansjörg Raffl; Norbert Huber; Italy	Kurt Brugger; Wilfried Huber; Italy	Jörg Hoffmann; Jochen Pietzsch; East Germany
1991 Winterberg	Stefan Krauße; Jan Behrendt; Germany	Yves Mankel; Thomas Rudolph; Germany	Hansjörg Raffl; Norbert Huber; Italy
1993 Calgary	Stefan Krauße; Jan Behrendt; Germany	Hansjörg Raffl; Norbert Huber; Italy	Kurt Brugger; Wilfried Huber; Italy
1995 Lillehammer	Stefan Krauße (4); Jan Behrendt (4); Germany	Chris Thorpe; Gordy Sheer; United States	Kurt Brugger; Wilfried Huber; Italy
1996 Altenberg	Tobias Schiegl; Markus Schiegl; Austria	Chris Thorpe; Gordon Sheer; United States	Gerhard Plankensteiner; Oswald Haselrieder; Italy
1997 Innsbruck	Tobias Schiegl (2); Markus Schiegl (2); Austria	Stefan Krauße; Jan Behrendt; Germany	Steffen Skel; Steffen Wöller; Germany
1999 Königssee	Patric Leitner; Alexander Resch; Germany	Tobias Schiegl; Markus Schiegl; Austria	Mark Grimmette; Brian Martin; United States
2000 St. Moritz	Patric Leitner; Alexander Resch; Germany	Steffen Skel; Steffen Wöller; Germany	Mark Grimmette; Brian Martin; United States
2001 Calgary	André Florschütz; Torsten Wustlich; Germany	Steffen Skel; Steffen Wöller; Germany	Tobias Schiegl; Markus Schiegl; Austria
2003 Sigulda	Andreas Linger; Wolfgang Linger; Austria	Tobias Schiegl; Markus Schiegl; Austria	Patric Leitner; Alexander Resch; Germany
2004 Nagano	Patric Leitner; Alexander Resch; Germany	André Florschütz; Torsten Wustlich; Germany	Mark Grimmette; Brian Martin; United States
2005 Park City	André Florschütz; Torsten Wustlich; Germany	Patric Leitner; Alexander Resch; Germany	Mark Grimmette; Brian Martin; United States
2007 Innsbruck	Patric Leitner (4); Alexander Resch (4); Germany	Tobias Schiegl; Markus Schiegl; Austria	Mark Grimmette; Brian Martin; United States
2008 Oberhof	André Florschütz (3); Torsten Wustlich (3); Germany	Tobias Wendl; Tobias Arlt; Germany	Tobias Schiegl; Markus Schiegl; Austria
2009 Lake Placid	Gerhard Plankensteiner; Oswald Haselrieder; Italy	André Florschütz; Torsten Wustlich; Germany	Mark Grimmette; Brian Martin; United States
2011 Cesana	Andreas Linger; Wolfgang Linger; Austria	Christian Oberstolz; Patrick Gruber; Italy	Andris Šics; Juris Šics; Latvia
2012 Altenberg	Andreas Linger (3); Wolfgang Linger (3); Austria	Toni Eggert; Sascha Benecken; Germany	Peter Penz; Georg Fischler; Austria
2013 Whistler	Tobias Wendl; Tobias Arlt; Germany	Toni Eggert; Sascha Benecken; Germany	Andreas Linger; Wolfgang Linger; Austria
2015 Sigulda	Tobias Wendl; Tobias Arlt; Germany	Peter Penz; Georg Fischler; Austria	Christian Oberstolz; Patrick Gruber; Italy
2016 Königssee	Tobias Wendl (3); Tobias Arlt (3); Germany	Toni Eggert; Sascha Benecken; Germany	Christian Oberstolz; Patrick Gruber; Italy
2017 Innsbruck	Toni Eggert; Sascha Benecken; Germany	Tobias Wendl; Tobias Arlt; Germany	Robin Johannes Geueke; David Gamm; Germany
2019 Winterberg	Toni Eggert; Sascha Benecken; Germany	Tobias Wendl; Tobias Arlt; Germany	Thomas Steu; Lorenz Koller; Austria
2020 Sochi	Toni Eggert; Sascha Benecken; Germany	Alexander Denisyev; Vladislav Antonov; Russia	Tobias Wendl; Tobias Arlt; Germany
2021 Königssee	Toni Eggert; Sascha Benecken; Germany	Tobias Wendl; Tobias Arlt; Germany	Andris Šics; Juris Šics; Latvia
2023 Oberhof	Toni Eggert **(5)**; Sascha Benecken **(5)**; Germany	Tobias Wendl; Tobias Arlt; Germany	Yannick Müller; Armin Frauscher; Austria
2024 Altenberg	Juri Gatt; Riccardo Schöpf; Austria	Thomas Steu; Wolfgang Kindl; Austria	Tobias Wendl; Tobias Arlt; Germany
2025 Whistler	Hannes Orlamünder; Paul Gubitz; Germany	Mārtiņš Bots; Roberts Plūme; Latvia	Tobias Wendl; Tobias Arlt; Germany

Medal table

Rank	Nation	Gold	Silver	Bronze	Total
1	Germany	19	15	6	40
2	East Germany	11	9	7	27
3	Austria	10	9	11	30
4	Italy	5	8	8	21
5	West Germany	3	2	7	12
6	Poland	1	2	1	4
7	Soviet Union	1	1	1	3
8	United States	0	2	6	8
9	Latvia	0	1	2	3
10	Russia	0	1	0	1
11	Czechoslovakia	0	0	1	1
Totals (11 entries)		**50**	**50**	**50**	**150**

=== Women's doubles ===
Debuted: 2022.

Season	Winner	Runner-up	Third
2022 Winterberg	Jessica Degenhardt; Cheyenne Rosenthal; Germany	Luisa Romanenko; Pauline Patz; Germany	Chevonne Forgan; Sophia Kirkby; United States
2023 Oberhof	Jessica Degenhardt **(2)**; Cheyenne Rosenthal **(2)**; Germany	Selina Egle; Lara Kipp; Austria	Andrea Vötter; Marion Oberhofer; Italy
2024 Altenberg	Selina Egle; Lara Kipp; Austria	Anda Upīte; Zane Kaluma; Latvia	Chevonne Forgan; Sophia Kirkby; United States
2025 Whistler	Selina Egle **(2)**; Lara Kipp **(2)**; Austria	Jessica Degenhardt; Cheyenne Rosenthal; Germany	Dajana Eitberger; Magdalena Matschina; Germany

Medal table

Rank	Nation	Gold	Silver	Bronze	Total
1	Germany	2	2	1	5
2	Austria	2	1	0	3
3	Latvia	0	1	0	1
4	United States	0	0	2	2
5	Italy	0	0	1	1
Totals (5 entries)		**4**	**4**	**4**	**12**

=== Mixed team ===
Debuted: 1989 as five sleds (up to six members) per mixed team. Changed to three sleds (up to four members) per mixed team: 1999.
Changed to relay format – three sleds (four members) per mixed team: 2008. Changed to four sleds (six members) per mixed relay team: 2024.

Season	Winner	Runner-up	Third
1989 Winterberg	Norbert Huber; Gerhard Plankensteiner; Gerda Weissensteiner; Veronika Oberhuber; Hansjörg Raffl; Italy	Jens Müller; René Friedl; Susi Erdmann; Ute Oberhoffner; Stefan Krauße; Jan Behrendt; East Germany	Sergey Danilin; Yuri Kharchenko; Yuliya Antipova; Irina Kusakina; Yevgeny Belousov; Aleksandr Belyakov; Soviet Union
1990 Calgary	Jens Müller; Thomas Jacob; Gabriele Kohlisch; Susi Erdmann; Jörg Hoffmann; Jochen Pietzsch; East Germany	Arnold Huber; Norbert Huber; Nadia Prinoth; Gerda Weissensteiner; Hansjörg Raffl; Italy	Sergey Danilin; Andrey Rozhkov; Yuliya Antipova; Natalia Yakushenko; Igor Lobanov; Gennady Belyakov; Soviet Union
1991 Winterberg	Georg Hackl; Jens Müller; Susi Erdmann; Gabriele Kohlisch; Stefan Krauße; Jan Behrendt; Germany	Robert Manzenreiter; Markus Prock; Doris Neuner; Andrea Tagwerker; Gerhard Gleirscher; Markus Schmidt; Austria	Arnold Huber; Gerhard Plankensteiner; Natalie Obkircher; Gerda Weissensteiner; Hansjörg Raffl; Norbert Huber; Italy
1993 Calgary	Georg Hackl; René Friedl; Gabriele Kohlisch; Susi Erdmann; Stefan Krauße; Jan Behrendt; Germany	Robert Manzenreiter; Markus Prock; Angelika Neuner; Doris Neuner; Tobias Schiegl; Markus Schiegl; Austria	Arnold Huber; Gerhard Plankensteiner; Natalie Obkircher; Gerda Weissensteiner; Hansjörg Raffl; Norbert Huber; Italy
1995 Lillehammer	Georg Hackl; Jens Müller (3); Gabriele Kohlisch (4); Susi Erdmann (4); Stefan Krauße (3); Jan Behrendt (3); Germany	Arnold Huber; Armin Zöggeler; Natalie Obkircher; Gerda Weissensteiner; Kurt Brugger; Wilfried Huber; Italy	Markus Kleinheinz; Markus Prock; Angelika Neuner; Doris Neuner; Tobias Schiegl; Markus Schiegl; Austria
1996 Altenberg	Markus Prock; Markus Schmidt; Angelika Neuner; Andrea Tagwerker; Tobias Schiegl; Markus Schiegl; Austria	Georg Hackl; Jens Müller; Jana Bode; Gabriele Kohlisch; Stefan Krauße; Jan Behrendt; Germany	Wilfried Huber; Armin Zöggeler; Natalie Obkircher; Gerda Weissensteiner; Gerhard Plankensteiner; Oswald Haselrieder; Italy
1997 Innsbruck	Markus Prock; Gerhard Gleirscher; Andrea Tagwerker; Angelika Neuner (2); Tobias Schiegl; Markus Schiegl; Austria	Georg Hackl; Jens Müller; Silke Kraushaar; Sylke Otto; Stefan Krauße; Jan Behrendt; Germany	Wilfried Huber; Armin Zöggeler; Natalie Obkircher; Gerda Weissensteiner; Gerhard Plankensteiner; Oswald Haselrieder; Italy
1999 Königssee	Markus Prock (3); Andrea Tagwerker (3); Tobias Schiegl (3); Markus Schiegl (3); Austria	Robert Fegg; Silke Kraushaar; André Florschütz; Torsten Wustlich; Germany	Georg Hackl; Sylke Otto; Patric Leitner; Alexander Resch; Germany
2000 St.Moritz	Georg Hackl; Silke Kraushaar; Steffen Skel; Steffen Wöller; Germany	Jens Müller; Sylke Otto; Patric Leitner; Alexander Resch; Germany	Markus Prock; Angelika Neuner; Tobias Schiegl; Markus Schiegl; Austria
2001 Calgary	Georg Hackl; Silke Kraushaar; Patric Leitner; Alexander Resch; Germany	Karsten Albert; Sylke Otto; Steffen Skel; Steffen Wöller; Germany	Tony Benshoof; Becky Wilczak; Mark Grimmette; Brian Martin; United States
2003 Sigulda	Georg Hackl; Sylke Otto; Patric Leitner; Alexander Resch; Germany	Mārtiņš Rubenis; Anna Orlova; Zigmars Berkolds; Sandris Bērziņš; Latvia	Reiner Margreiter; Sonja Manzenreiter; Andreas Linger; Wolfgang Linger; Austria
2004 Nagano	David Möller; Barbara Niedernhuber; Patric Leitner; Alexander Resch; Germany	Tony Benshoof; Ashley Hayden; Mark Grimmette; Brian Martin; United States	Armin Zöggeler; Anastasia Oberstolz-Antonova; Christian Oberstolz; Patrick Gruber; Italy
2005 Park City	Georg Hackl **(7)**; Sylke Otto (2); André Florschütz; Torsten Wustlich; Germany	Tony Benshoof; Ashley Hayden; Mark Grimmette; Brian Martin; United States	Armin Zöggeler; Anastasia Oberstolz-Antonova; Christian Oberstolz; Patrick Gruber; Italy
2007 Innsbruck	David Möller (2); Silke Kraushaar-Pielach (3); Patric Leitner (4); Alexander Resch (4); Germany	Armin Zöggeler; Sandra Gasparini; Christian Oberstolz; Patrick Gruber; Italy	Daniel Pfister; Nina Reithmeyer; Peter Penz; Georg Fischler; Austria
2008 Oberhof	Felix Loch; Tatjana Hüfner; André Florschütz; Torsten Wustlich; Germany	Martin Abentung; Nina Reithmeyer; Tobias Schiegl; Markus Schiegl; Austria	Guntis Rēķis; Maija Tīruma; Andris Šics; Juris Šics; Latvia
2009 Lake Placid	Felix Loch; Natalie Geisenberger; André Florschütz (3); Torsten Wustlich (3); Germany	Daniel Pfister; Nina Reithmeyer; Peter Penz; Georg Fischler; Austria	Guntis Rēķis; Maija Tīruma; Andris Šics; Juris Šics; Latvia
2011 Cesana	Cancelled		
2012 Altenberg	Tatjana Hüfner; Felix Loch; Toni Eggert; Sascha Benecken; Germany	Tatiana Ivanova; Albert Demchenko; Vladislav Yuzhakov; Vladimir Makhnutin; Russia	Alex Gough; Samuel Edney; Tristan Walker; Justin Snith; Canada
2013 Whistler	Natalie Geisenberger; Felix Loch; Tobias Wendl; Tobias Arlt; Germany	Alex Gough; Samuel Edney; Tristan Walker; Justin Snith; Canada	Elīza Tīruma; Inārs Kivlenieks; Andris Šics; Juris Šics; Latvia
2015 Sigulda	Natalie Geisenberger; Felix Loch; Tobias Wendl; Tobias Arlt; Germany	Tatiana Ivanova; Semen Pavlichenko; Andrey Bogdanov; Andrey Medvedev; Russia	Alex Gough; Samuel Edney; Tristan Walker; Justin Snith; Canada
2016 Königssee	Natalie Geisenberger (4); Felix Loch (6); Tobias Wendl; Tobias Arlt; Germany	Elīza Cauce; Inārs Kivlenieks; Andris Šics; Juris Šics; Latvia	Alex Gough; Mitchel Malyk; Tristan Walker; Justin Snith; Canada
2017 Innsbruck	Tatjana Hüfner (3); Johannes Ludwig; Toni Eggert; Sascha Benecken; Germany	Erin Hamlin; Tucker West; Matt Mortensen; Jayson Terdiman; United States	Tatiana Ivanova; Roman Repilov; Alexander Denisyev; Vladislav Antonov; Russia
2019 Winterberg	Tatiana Ivanova; Semen Pavlichenko; Vladislav Yuzhakov; Yuri Prokhorov; Russia	Hannah Prock; Reinhard Egger; Thomas Steu; Lorenz Koller; Austria	Natalie Geisenberger; Felix Loch; Toni Eggert; Sascha Benecken; Germany
2020 Sochi	Julia Taubitz; Johannes Ludwig (2); Toni Eggert; Sascha Benecken; Germany	Kendija Aparjode; Kristers Aparjods; Andris Šics; Juris Šics; Latvia	Summer Britcher; Tucker West; Chris Mazdzer; Jayson Terdiman; United States
2021 Königssee	Madeleine Egle; David Gleirscher; Thomas Steu; Lorenz Koller; Austria	Julia Taubitz; Felix Loch; Toni Eggert; Sascha Benecken; Germany	Kendija Aparjode; Artūrs Dārznieks; Andris Šics; Juris Šics; Latvia
2023 Oberhof	Anna Berreiter; Max Langenhan; Toni Eggert (4); Sascha Benecken (4); Germany	Madeleine Egle; Jonas Müller; Yannick Müller; Armin Frauscher; Austria	Kendija Aparjode; Kristers Aparjods; Mārtiņš Bots; Roberts Plūme; Latvia
2024 Altenberg	Julia Taubitz; Tobias Wendl (4); Tobias Arlt (4); Max Langenhan; Dajana Eitberger; Saskia Schirmer; Germany	Summer Britcher; Dana Kellogg; Frank Ike; Tucker West; Chevonne Forgan; Sophia Kirkby; United States	Elīna Ieva Vītola; Mārtiņš Bots; Roberts Plūme; Kristers Aparjods; Anda Upīte; Zane Kaluma; Latvia
2025 Whistler	Julia Taubitz (3); Hannes Orlamünder; Paul Gubitz; Max Langenhan (3); Jessica Degenhardt; Cheyenne Rosenthal; Germany	Madeleine Egle; Thomas Steu; Wolfgang Kindl; Nico Gleirscher; Selina Egle; Lara Kipp; Austria	Embyr-Lee Susko; Devin Wardrope; Cole Zajanski; Theo Downey; Beattie Podulsky; Kailey Allan; Canada

Medal table

Rank	Nation	Gold	Silver	Bronze	Total
1	Germany	20	6	2	28
2	Austria	4	7	4	15
3	Italy	1	3	6	10
4	Russia	1	2	1	4
5	East Germany	1	1	0	2
6	United States	0	4	2	6
7	Latvia	0	3	6	9
8	Canada	0	1	4	5
9	Soviet Union	0	0	2	2
Totals (9 entries)		**27**	**27**	**27**	**81**

=== Mixed singles ===
Debuted: 2025 as two sleds (two members) per mixed relay team.

Season	Winner	Runner-up	Third
2025 Whistler	Max Langenhan; Julia Taubitz; Germany	Jonathan Gustafson; Emily Sweeney; United States	David Gleirscher; Madeleine Egle; Austria

Medal table

Rank	Nation	Gold	Silver	Bronze	Total
1	Germany	1	0	0	1
2	United States	0	1	0	1
3	Austria	0	0	1	1
Totals (3 entries)		**1**	**1**	**1**	**3**

=== Mixed doubles ===
Debuted: 2025 as two sleds (four members) per mixed relay team.

Season	Winner	Runner-up	Third
2025 Whistler	Thomas Steu; Wolfgang Kindl; Selina Egle; Lara Kipp; Austria	Hannes Orlamünder; Paul Gubitz; Dajana Eitberger; Magdalena Matschina; Germany	Tobias Wendl; Tobias Arlt; Jessica Degenhardt; Cheyenne Rosenthal; Germany

Medal table

Rank	Nation	Gold	Silver	Bronze	Total
1	Austria	1	0	0	1
2	Germany	0	1	1	2
Totals (2 entries)		**1**	**1**	**1**	**3**

=== Men's sprint ===
Debuted: 2016. Discontinued: 2024.

Season	Winner	Runner-up	Third
2016 Königssee	Felix Loch (GER)	Andi Langenhan (GER)	Ralf Palik (GER)
2017 Innsbruck	Wolfgang Kindl (AUT)	Roman Repilov (RUS)	Dominik Fischnaller (ITA)
2019 Winterberg	Jonas Müller (AUT)	Felix Loch (GER)	Semen Pavlichenko (RUS)
2020 Sochi	Roman Repilov (RUS)	David Gleirscher (AUT)	Dominik Fischnaller (ITA)
2021 Königssee	Nico Gleirscher (AUT)	Semen Pavlichenko (RLF)	David Gleirscher (AUT)
2023 Oberhof	Felix Loch (GER) **(2)**	Jonas Müller (AUT)	Max Langenhan (GER)
2024 Altenberg	David Gleirscher (AUT)	Max Langenhan (GER)	Kristers Aparjods (LAT)

Medal table

Rank	Nation	Gold	Silver	Bronze	Total
1	Austria	4	2	1	7
2	Germany	2	3	2	7
3	Russia	1	1	1	3
4	Russian Luge Federation	0	1	0	1
5	Italy	0	0	2	2
6	Latvia	0	0	1	1
Totals (6 entries)		**7**	**7**	**7**	**21**

=== Women's sprint ===
Debuted: 2016. Discontinued: 2024.

Season	Winner	Runner-up	Third
2016 Königssee	Martina Kocher (SUI)	Natalie Geisenberger (GER)	Dajana Eitberger (GER)
2017 Innsbruck	Erin Hamlin (USA)	Martina Kocher (SUI)	Tatjana Hüfner (GER)
2019 Winterberg	Natalie Geisenberger (GER)	Julia Taubitz (GER)	Dajana Eitberger (GER)
2020 Sochi	Ekaterina Katnikova (RUS)	Tatiana Ivanova (RUS)	Elīza Cauce (LAT)
2021 Königssee	Julia Taubitz (GER)	Anna Berreiter (GER)	Dajana Eitberger (GER)
2023 Oberhof	Dajana Eitberger (GER)	Julia Taubitz (GER)	Anna Berreiter (GER)
2024 Altenberg	Julia Taubitz (GER) **(2)**	Natalie Maag (SUI)	Elīna Ieva Vītola (LAT)

Medal table

Rank	Nation	Gold	Silver	Bronze	Total
1	Germany	4	4	5	13
2	Switzerland	1	2	0	3
3	Russia	1	1	0	2
4	United States	1	0	0	1
5	Latvia	0	0	2	2
Totals (5 entries)		**7**	**7**	**7**	**21**

=== Men's doubles' sprint ===
Debuted: 2016 as open event to men and women. Changed to men's doubles' sprint: 2023. Discontinued: 2024.

Season	Winner	Runner-up	Third
2016 Königssee	Tobias Wendl; Tobias Arlt; Germany	Peter Penz; Georg Fischler; Austria	Christian Oberstolz; Patrick Gruber; Italy
2017 Innsbruck	Tobias Wendl; Tobias Arlt; Germany	Peter Penz; Georg Fischler; Austria	Toni Eggert; Sascha Benecken; Germany
2019 Winterberg	Toni Eggert; Sascha Benecken; Germany	Tobias Wendl; Tobias Arlt; Germany	Thomas Steu; Lorenz Koller; Austria
2020 Sochi	Alexander Denisyev; Vladislav Antonov; Russia	Emanuel Rieder; Simon Kainzwaldner; Italy	Tobias Wendl; Tobias Arlt; Germany
2021 Königssee	Tobias Wendl **(3)**; Tobias Arlt **(3)**; Germany	Andris Šics; Juris Šics; Latvia	Toni Eggert; Sascha Benecken; Germany
2023 Oberhof	Toni Eggert (2); Sascha Benecken (2); Germany	Tobias Wendl; Tobias Arlt; Germany	Yannick Müller; Armin Frauscher; Austria
2024 Altenberg	Mārtiņš Bots; Roberts Plūme; Latvia	Thomas Steu; Wolfgang Kindl; Austria	Juri Gatt; Riccardo Schöpf; Austria

Medal table

Rank	Nation	Gold	Silver	Bronze	Total
1	Germany	5	2	3	10
2	Latvia	1	1	0	2
3	Russia	1	0	0	1
4	Austria	0	3	3	6
5	Italy	0	1	1	2
Totals (5 entries)		**7**	**7**	**7**	**21**

=== Women's doubles' sprint ===
Debuted: 2023. Discontinued: 2024.

Season	Winner	Runner-up	Third
2023 Oberhof	Jessica Degenhardt; Cheyenne Rosenthal; Germany	Selina Egle; Lara Kipp; Austria	Andrea Vötter; Marion Oberhofer; Italy
2024 Altenberg	Andrea Vötter; Marion Oberhofer; Italy	Anda Upīte; Zane Kaluma; Latvia	Marta Robežniece; Kitija Bogdanova; Latvia

Medal table

Rank	Nation	Gold	Silver	Bronze	Total
1	Italy	1	0	1	2
2	Germany	1	0	0	1
3	Latvia	0	1	1	2
4	Austria	0	1	0	1
Totals (4 entries)		**2**	**2**	**2**	**6**

== Medal table ==
Updated after the 2025 FIL World Luge Championships.

Rank	Nation	Gold	Silver	Bronze	Total
1	Germany	88	71	41	200
2	East Germany	35	27	23	85
3	Austria	32	39	47	118
4	Italy	17	18	33	68
5	West Germany	12	12	14	38
6	Russia	7	9	5	21
7	Poland	5	6	5	16
8	United States	3	8	12	23
9	Soviet Union	3	4	5	12
10	Switzerland	2	4	0	6
11	Latvia	1	8	13	22
12	Canada	1	1	7	9
13	Russian Luge Federation	1	1	0	2
14	Norway	1	0	0	1
15	Czechoslovakia	0	0	2	2
16	Ukraine	0	0	1	1
Totals (16 entries)		208	208	208	624

== Multiple medalists ==
Boldface denotes active lugers and highest medal count among all lugers (including these who not included in these tables) per type.

=== Men ===
Rank	Luger	Country	From	To	Gold	Silver	Bronze	Total
1	**Felix Loch**	Germany	2008	2025	**14**	6	2	**22**
2	Sascha Benecken	Germany	2012	2023	11	4	3	18
2	**Toni Eggert**	Germany	2012	2023	11	4	3	18
4	Georg Hackl	West Germany; Germany	1987	2005	10	**10**	2	**22**
5	**Tobias Arlt**	Germany	2008	2025	10	7	5	**22**
5	**Tobias Wendl**	Germany	2008	2025	10	7	5	**22**
7	Patric Leitner	Germany	1999	2007	8	2	2	12
7	Alexander Resch	Germany	1999	2007	8	2	2	12
9	Jan Behrendt	East Germany; Germany	1989	1997	7	4	–	11
9	Stefan Krauße	East Germany; Germany	1989	1997	7	4	–	11

=== Women ===
Rank	Luger	Country	From	To	Gold	Silver	Bronze	Total
1	Natalie Geisenberger	Germany	2008	2021	**9**	5	2	**16**
2	**Julia Taubitz**	Germany	2019	2025	8	**7**	–	15
3	Tatjana Hüfner	Germany	2007	2017	8	1	2	11
4	Susi Erdmann	East Germany; Germany	1989	1997	7	3	–	10
5	Gabriele Kohlisch	East Germany; Germany	1987	1996	6	4	–	10
6	Sylke Otto	Germany	1997	2005	6	3	3	12
7	Silke Kraushaar-Pielach	Germany	1997	2008	4	4	2	10
8	**Jessica Degenhardt**	Germany	2022	2025	4	1	1	6
8	**Cheyenne Rosenthal**	Germany	2022	2025	4	1	1	6
10	Margit Schumann	East Germany	1973	1977	4	–	–	4
