= FIL World Luge Championships 1999 =

The FIL World Luge Championships 1999 took place in Königssee, Germany for a record fifth time. Königssee had hosted the event previously in 1969, 1970, 1974, and 1979. The team event was modified to one each for men's doubles, men's singles, and women's singles starting at these championships which reduced the number of competitors per team from six to four.

== Men's singles ==
Medal	Athlete	Time
Gold	Armin Zöggeler (ITA)	
Silver	Jens Müller (GER)	
Bronze	Norbert Huber (ITA)	

== Women's singles ==
Medal	Athlete	Time
Gold	Sonja Wiedemann (GER)	
Silver	Barbara Niedernhuber (GER)	
Bronze	Sylke Otto (GER)	

== Men's doubles ==
Medal	Athlete	Time
Gold	Germany (Patric Leitner, Alexander Resch)	
Silver	Austria (Tobias Schiegl, Markus Schiegl)	
Bronze	United States (Mark Grimmette, Brian Martin)	

== Mixed team ==
Medal	Athlete	Time
Gold	Austria (Markus Prock, Angelika Tagwerker, Tobias Schiegl, Markus Schiegl)	
Silver	Germany (Robert Fegg, Silke Kraushaar, André Florschütz, Torsten Wustlich)	
Bronze	Germany (Georg Hackl, Sylke Otto, Patric Leitner, Alexander Resch)	

== Medal table ==
Rank	Nation	Gold	Silver	Bronze	Total
1	Germany (GER)	2	3	2	7
2	Austria (AUT)	1	1	0	2
3	Italy (ITA)	1	0	1	2
4	United States (USA)	0	0	1	1
Totals (4 entries)		4	4	4	12
