= Venues of the 1972 Winter Olympics =

For the 1972 Winter Olympics in Sapporo, Japan, a total of twelve sports venues were used. A thirteenth venue which was a reserved luge course was constructed, but never used in actual competition. Construction on all of the venues used took place between 1968 and early 1971 in time for the test events. The Tsuskisamu Indoor Skating Rink was not completed until late 1971 or early 1972 because the number of teams scheduled to compete at the 1972 Games was not known. At the actual luge venue used, a malfunctioning starting gate during the first run led to the results being cancelled and rerun being ordered. The results of this event led to the only tie in Olympic luge history. The ski jumps at Miyanomori and Okurayama served as host venues for the FIS Nordic World Ski Championships thirty-five years later.

== Venues ==
=== City ===
Venue	Sports	Capacity	Ref.
Makomanai Biathlon site	Biathlon	Not listed.	
Makomanai Cross-country site	Cross-country skiing, Nordic combined (cross-country skiing)	Not listed.	
Makomanai Ice Arena	Figure skating, Ice hockey, closing ceremonies	11,500	
Makomanai Speed Skating Rink	Opening ceremonies, Speed skating	30,000	
Mikaho Indoor Skating Rink	Figure skating	12,000	
Tsukisamu Indoor Skating Rink	Ice hockey	6,000	

A reserve luge course was constructed 9 km (5.6 mi) south of Sapporo's Olympic village at the Fujino ski area, but was never used. Constructed between June 1968 and November 1971, the track cost ¥106 million to build. It was 1,000 m (3,300 ft) long for men's singles and 924.55 m (3,033.3 ft) long for women's singles and men's doubles, had 14 turns for all three luge disciplines, and had a 10% average gradient for the track. No turn names were given.

=== Mountain ===
Venue	Sports	Capacity	Ref.
Miyanomori Jumping Hill	Nordic combined (ski jumping), Ski jumping (normal hill)	Not listed.	
Mount Eniwa Downhill Course	Alpine skiing (downhill)	Not listed.	
Mt. Teine Alpine Skiing courses	Alpine skiing (slalom, giant slalom)	Not listed.	
Mt. Teine Bobsleigh Course	Bobsleigh	Not listed.	
Mt. Teine Luge Course	Luge	Not listed.	
Okurayama Jumping Hill	Ski jumping (large hill)	50,000	

== Before the Olympics ==
At the 1936 Winter Olympics in Garmisch-Partenkirchen, Germany, the International Olympic Committee (IOC), the decision to award the 1940 Winter Olympics was suspended. This was because of an issue with amateurism between the IOC and the International Ski Federation. Three years earlier, at an IOC meeting in Oslo, Japan had expressed an interest in hosting the Winter Olympics, with Sapporo and Nikkō as possible locations, though four other sites were also considered. Because Tokyo had been awarded host of the 1940 Summer Olympics, the IOC awarded Japan the 1940 Winter Games. This was confirmed by the IOC at the 1937 meeting in Cairo on the condition that the 1940 Games would be given to Norway if Japan could not organize the preparations by the fall of 1938. One of the venues of the 1940 Winter Games that would be included in the 1972 Winter Olympics was the Mount Okura ski jump. In July 1937, Japan's second invasion of China began, and despite being awarded the 1940 Winter Olympics, Sapporo was forced to withdraw from hosting the 1940 Winter Olympics as was Tokyo with the 1940 Summer Olympics.

Okurayama was constructed using private funds in 1931.

At the 1959 IOC Meeting in Munich, Tokyo was selected to host the 1964 Summer Olympics. This inspired Sapporo to try to host the 1968 Winter Olympics. Sapporo submitted its bid in 1963 to the IOC. On 29 January 1964 at the IOC Meeting in Innsbruck, Sapporo finished a distant fourth to winner Grenoble for the 1968 Winter Games. Following observations of the 1964 Summer Games in Tokyo, an aggressive public relations campaign began with Sapporo and the IOC to bring the 1972 Winter Games to Sapporo. This campaign proved fruitful when Sapporo was awarded the 1972 Winter Games at the April 1966 IOC meeting in Rome.

Venue construction began in 1968 and all but the Tsukisamu Indoor rink was completed in time for the test events at Sapporo in February 1971. Tsukisamu was not completed until late 1971 or early 1972 due to not knowing how many teams would compete at the 1972 Olympic ice hockey tournament.

== During the Olympics ==
During the men's 5000 m speed skating event, Ard Schenk of the Netherlands won the event despite a snowstorm. It was the first of Schenk's three gold medals at the games.

The only noted venue issue was at the Mt. Teine Luge Course was in the men's doubles event when a malfunctioning starting gate cancelled the results of the first run. Italy, whose doubles team of Paul Hildgartner and Walter Plaikner won the first run, protested to event officials the results should stand since all contestants had suffered equally, but to no avail. After the protest was denied, a rerun was ordered. Hildgartner and Plaikner won the first run of the rerunned event while the East German team of Horst Hörnlein and Reinhard Bredow had the fastest second run. The combined times were equal for the only time in Winter Olympic luge history. The International Luge Federation consulted with IOC President Avery Brundage on this matter, and gold medals were awarded to both teams as a result. By the time of the 1976 Winter Olympics, artificial track luge would be timed in thousandths of a second (0.001) rather than hundredths of a second (0.01) in an effort to avoid ties. That would prove effective until the FIL European Luge Championships 2008 at Cesana, when another tie occurred. This tie was again in the men's doubles event and it again involved Italy and Germany (East and West Germany reunified in 1990) only this time it was for a bronze medal rather than gold.

== After the Olympics ==
The biathlon and cross-country skiing venues at Makomanai were temporary venues and torn down after the Olympics. The bobsleigh and luge tracks were used for recreational purposes, but no other competitions after the Olympics were held there. When Nagano was awarded the 1998 Winter Olympics in June 1991, the tracks were dismantled.

Okurayama and Miyanomori would serve as the ski jumping venues for the ski jumping and the ski jumping portion of the Nordic combined events when Sapporo hosted the FIS Nordic World Ski Championships in 2007. It has been on the Ski Jumping World Cup circuit on an almost annual basis since 1980.

Mount Teine remains a popular alpine skiing site that has been in use since the 1972 Games.

== See also ==
- Winter Olympic Games
