= Marcin Piekarski =

Polish luger (born 1983)

Marcin Piekarski (born 21 September 1983 in Gorzów Wielkopolski) is a Polish luger who has competed since 1998. He finished 17th in the men's doubles event at the 2006 Winter Olympics in Turin.

Piekarski's best finish at the FIL World Luge Championships was 19th in the men's doubles event twice (2005, 2008).
