= FIL World Luge Championships 1987 =

The FIL World Luge Championships 1987 took place in Igls, Austria for the second time, having done so previously in 1977.

== Men's singles ==
Medal	Athlete	Time
Gold	Markus Prock (AUT)	
Silver	Jens Müller (GDR)	
Bronze	Sergey Danilin (URS)	

Prock wins Austria's first medal at the world championships since 1978.

== Women's singles ==
Medal	Athlete	Time
Gold	Cerstin Schmidt (GDR)	
Silver	Gabriele Kohlisch (GDR)	
Bronze	Ute Oberhoffner-Weiss (GDR)	

== Men's doubles ==
Medal	Athlete	Time
Gold	East Germany (Jörg Hoffmann, Jochen Pietzsch)	
Silver	West Germany (Stefan Ilsanker, Georg Hackl)	
Bronze	West Germany (Thomas Schwab, Wolfgang Staudinger)	

Hoffmann and Pietzsch become the first lugers to win three straight World Championship events.

== Medal table ==
Rank	Nation	Gold	Silver	Bronze	Total
1	East Germany (GDR)	2	2	1	5
2	Austria (AUT)	1	0	0	1
3	West Germany (FRG)	0	1	1	2
4	Soviet Union (URS)	0	0	1	1
Totals (4 entries)		3	3	3	9
