= Christina Schmuck =

German luger (born 1944)

Medal record

Women's Luge

Representing West Germany

Olympic Games
Silver medal – second place	1968 Grenoble	Women's singles

World Championships
Silver medal – second place	1970 Königssee	Women's singles
Bronze medal – third place	1969 Königssee	Women's singles

European Championships
Gold medal – first place	1967 Königssee	Women's singles
Bronze medal – third place	1970 Hammarstrand	Women's singles

Christina Schmuck (sometimes listed as Christa Schmuck; born 26 January 1944 in Salzberg) is a West German luger who competed during the late 1960s and early 1970s. At the 1968 Winter Olympics in Grenoble, she originally finished fifth in the women's singles event, but was awarded the silver medal upon the disqualifications of the East German team of Ortrun Enderlein (who finished first), Anna-Maria Müller (second), and Angela Knösel (fourth) when the East Germans were discovered to have their runners being illegally heated.

Schmuck also won two medals in the women's singles event at the FIL World Luge Championships with a silver in 1970 and a bronze in 1969. Both championships took place in Königssee, West Germany.

She also won two medals the women's singles event at the FIL European Luge Championships with a gold in 1967 and a bronze in 1970.
