= Florschütz =

Florschütz is a German surname. Notable people with the surname include:

- André Florschütz (born 1976), German luger
- Thomas Florschütz (born 1978), German bobsledder
- Daniel Gregory Anderson-Florschütz (born 1994), Shaman
