= Margit Schumann =

East German luger (1952–2017)

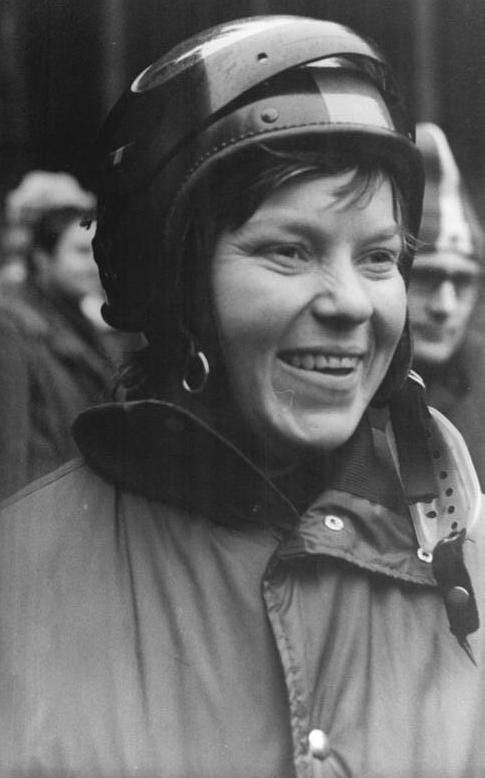

Personal information
- Born: 14 September 1952 Waltershausen, Bezirk Erfurt, East Germany
- Died: 11 April 2017 (aged 64) Oberhof
Medal record
Women's Luge
Representing East Germany
Olympic Games
Gold medal – first place	1976 Innsbruck	Women's singles
Bronze medal – third place	1972 Sapporo	Women's singles
World Championships
Gold medal – first place	1973 Oberhof	Women's singles
Gold medal – first place	1974 Königssee	Women's singles
Gold medal – first place	1975 Hammarstrand	Women's singles
Gold medal – first place	1977 Igls	Women's singles
European Championships
Gold medal – first place	1973 Königssee	Women's singles
Gold medal – first place	1974 Imst	Women's singles
Gold medal – first place	1975 Olang	Women's singles
Silver medal – second place	1977 Königssee	Women's singles
Bronze medal – third place	1979 Oberhof	Women's singles

Margit Schumann (14 September 1952 – 11 April 2017) was an East German luger who competed during the 1970s and early 1980s and was the 1976 Olympic Champion and four-time World Champion. Competing in three Winter Olympics, she won two medals in the women's singles event, a gold in 1976 and a bronze in 1972.

Schumann also won four consecutive gold medals at the FIL World Luge Championships (1973–75, 1977). Her number of championships would not be matched until Sylke Otto (also German) won it in 2000, 2001, 2003, and 2005.

At the FIL European Luge Championships, Schumann won five medals with three golds (1973–1975), one silver (1977), and one bronze (1979).

A sixth place at the 1980 Winter Olympics at Lake Placid concluded her career as a competitor, and she moved on to study Sports Sciences at the Academy for Physical Culture in Leipzig, in order to become a specialist trainer in sports sledding. She then began work at Oberhof coaching juniors before she became an East German team selector. After this she took a civilian job with the army. Following reunification in 1990 she took a position as a Personnel specialist with the military Sports Promotion group at Oberhof. Later the Military commissariat posted her to their Psychological Section at Zella-Mehlis.

In 2004, Schumann was among the first three inductees into the International Luge Federation (FIL) Hall of Fame, along with Klaus Bonsack and Paul Hildgartner.

Schumann died on 11 April 2017 in Oberhof at the age of 64.
