= FIL World Luge Championships 1979 =

The FIL World Luge Championships 1979 took place in Königssee, West Germany for a record fourth time. Königssee had hosted the event previously in 1969, 1970, and 1974. The track also hosted the bobsleigh world championships that same year, the first time that had ever happened in both bobsleigh and luge in a non-Winter Olympic year (Igls hosted both bobsleigh and luge events at the 1976 games held in neighboring Innsbruck.).

== Men's singles ==
| Medal | Athlete | Time |
|---|---|---|
| Gold | Detlef Günther (GDR) | |
| Silver | Karl Brunner (ITA) | |
| Bronze | Paul Hildgartner (ITA) | |

== Women's singles ==
| Medal | Athlete | Time |
|---|---|---|
| Gold | Melitta Sollmann (GDR) | |
| Silver | Elisabeth Demleitner (GER) | |
| Bronze | Marie-Luise Rainer (ITA) | |

== Men's doubles ==
| Medal | Athlete | Time |
|---|---|---|
| Gold | West Germany (Hans Brandner, Balthasar Schwarm) | |
| Silver | East Germany (Hans Rinn, Norbert Hahn) | |
| Bronze | West Germany (Anton Winkler, Franz Wembacher) | |

== Medal table ==
| Rank | Nation | Gold | Silver | Bronze | Total |
|---|---|---|---|---|---|
| 1 | East Germany (GDR) | 2 | 1 | 0 | 3 |
| 2 | West Germany (FRG) | 1 | 1 | 1 | 3 |
| 3 | Italy (ITA) | 0 | 1 | 2 | 3 |
| Totals (3 entries) | | 3 | 3 | 3 | 9 |
