= Thomas Köhler =

East German luger (born 1940)

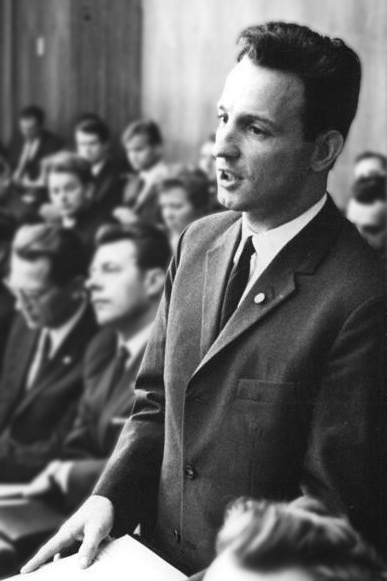
- Köhler in 1968

Personal information
- Nationality: (Germany) German
- Born: 25 June 1940 (age 86) Oberwiesenthal, Saxony, Germany
- Height: 171 cm (5 ft 7 in)
- Weight: 70 kg (154 lb)

Sport
- Country: Germany
- Sport: Luge
- Club: SC Traktor Oberwiesenthal
- Retired: 1969

Achievements and titles
- Personal best: 1st place, gold medalist(s) 2nd place, silver medalist(s)
Medal record
Men's luge
Representing Germany
Olympic Games
Gold medal – first place	1964 Innsbruck	Men's singles
Representing East Germany
Olympic Games
Gold medal – first place	1968 Grenoble	Men's doubles
Silver medal – second place	1968 Grenoble	Men's singles
World Championships
Gold medal – first place	1962 Krynica	Men's singles
Gold medal – first place	1967 Hammarstrand	Men's singles
Gold medal – first place	1967 Hammarstrand	Men's doubles
Silver medal – second place	1965 Davos	Men's doubles

Thomas Köhler (born 25 June 1940) is an East German former luger who competed during the 1960s.

He won three Winter Olympic medals in men's luge with two golds (Singles: 1964, Doubles: 1968) and one silver (Singles: 1968).

Köhler won five medals at the FIL World Luge Championships with three golds (singles: 1962, 1967; doubles: 1967) and one silver (doubles: 1965).
