= Marie-Claude Doyon =

Canadian luger (born 1965)

Marie-Claude Doyon (born April 22, 1965 in Princeville, Quebec) is a Canadian luger who competed in the late 1980s. She finished seventh in the women's singles event at the 1988 Winter Olympics in Calgary.

Claude-Doyon is married to Wolfgang Staudinger, coach of the Korean luge team. They have a daughter born in 1999.
