= Jörg Hoffmann (luger) =

East German luger (born 1963)

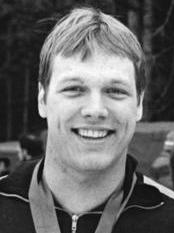
- Hoffmann in 1984

Medal record

Men's luge

Representing East Germany

Olympic Games
Gold medal – first place	1988 Calgary	Men's doubles
Bronze medal – third place	1984 Sarajevo	Men's doubles

World Championships
Gold medal – first place	1983 Lake Placid	Men's doubles
Gold medal – first place	1985 Oberhof	Men's doubles
Gold medal – first place	1987 Igls	Men's doubles
Gold medal – first place	1990 Calgary	Mixed team
Silver medal – second place	1985 Oberhof	Men's singles
Bronze medal – third place	1989 Winterberg	Men's doubles
Bronze medal – third place	1990 Calgary	Men's doubles

World Cup Championships
Gold medal – first place	1983–84	Men's doubles
Bronze medal – third place	1988–89	Men's doubles

European Championships
Gold medal – first place	1990 Igls	Men's doubles
Gold medal – first place	1990 Igls	Mixed team
Silver medal – second place	1986 Hammarstrand	Men's doubles

Jörg Hoffmann (born 15 March 1963 in Sondershausen) is a former East German luger who competed from the mid-1980s to 1990. Together with Jochen Pietzsch he won two medals in the men's doubles event with a gold in 1988 and a bronze in 1984.

Hoffmann also found great success at the FIL World Luge Championships with a total of seven medals, including four gold (Men's doubles: 1983, 1985, 1987; Mixed team: 1990), one silver (Men's singles: 1985), and two bronzes (Men's doubles: 1989, 1990). He also won three medals at the FIL European Luge Championships with two golds (Men's doubles and mixed team: both 1990) and one silver (Men's doubles: 1986).

Hoffmann won the overall Luge World Cup title in men's doubles in 1983–4.
