= Hans Rinn =

East German luger (born 1953)

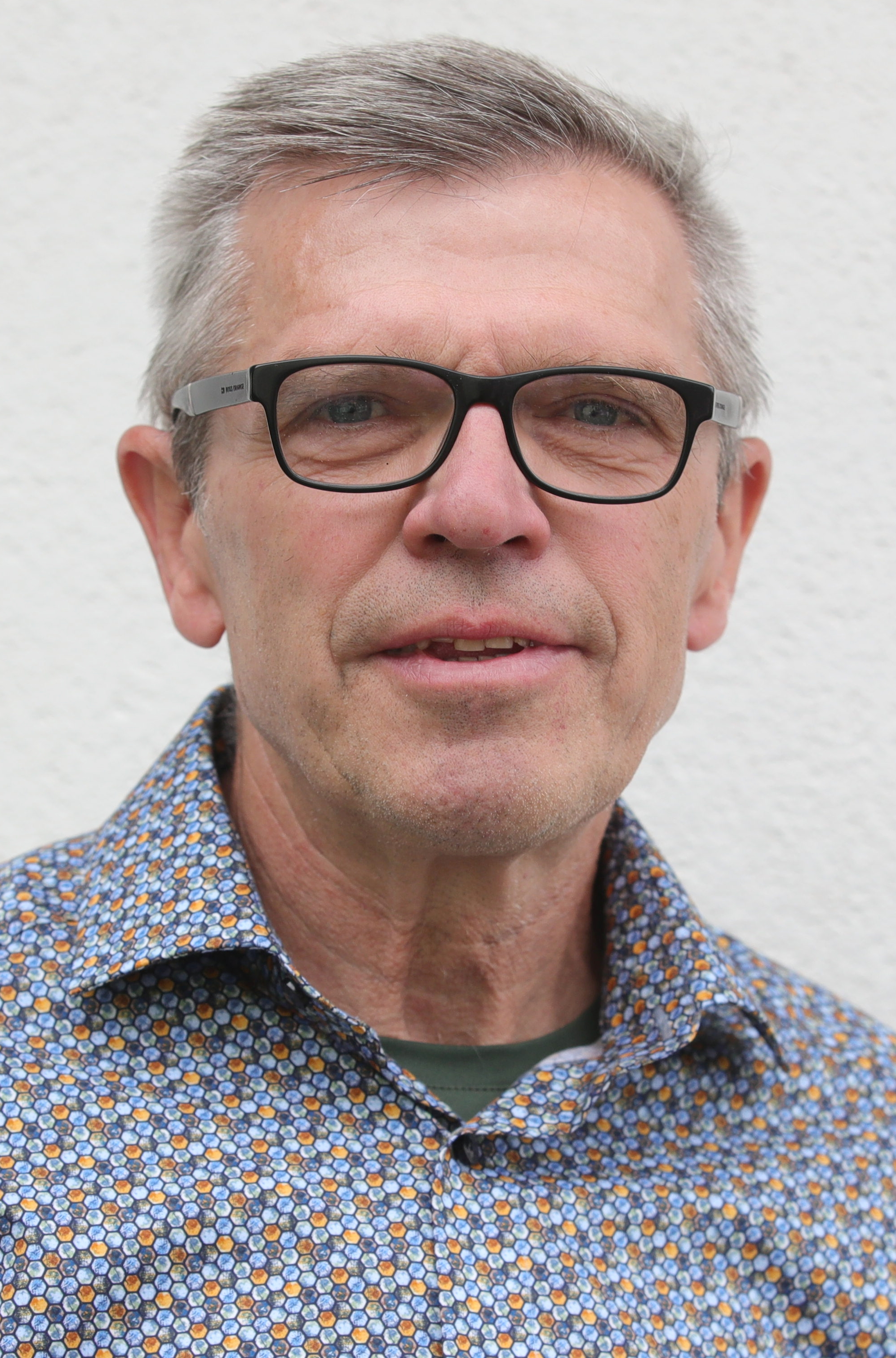
- Rinn in 2022
Medal record
Men's Luge
Representing East Germany
Olympic Games
Gold medal – first place	1976 Innsbruck	Men's doubles
Gold medal – first place	1980 Lake Placid	Men's doubles
Bronze medal – third place	1976 Innsbruck	Men's singles
World Championships
Gold medal – first place	1973 Oberhof	Men's singles
Gold medal – first place	1975 Hammarstrand	Men's doubles
Gold medal – first place	1977 Igls	Men's singles
Gold medal – first place	1977 Igls	Men's doubles
Silver medal – second place	1973 Oberhof	Men's doubles
Silver medal – second place	1974 Königssee	Men's singles
Silver medal – second place	1979 Königssee	Men's doubles
Bronze medal – third place	1978 Imst	Men's doubles
European Championships
Gold medal – first place	1973 Königssee	Men's singles
Gold medal – first place	1973 Königssee	Men's doubles
Gold medal – first place	1974 Imst	Men's singles
Gold medal – first place	1975 Olang	Men's doubles
Gold medal – first place	1978 Hammarstrand	Men's doubles
Gold medal – first place	1979 Oberhof	Men's singles
Gold medal – first place	1980 Olang	Men's doubles
Silver medal – second place	1974 Imst	Men's doubles
Silver medal – second place	1977 Königssee	Men's singles
Silver medal – second place	1977 Königssee	Men's doubles
Silver medal – second place	1978 Hammarstrand	Men's singles
Silver medal – second place	1979 Oberhof	Men's doubles
Silver medal – second place	1982 Winterberg	Men's doubles
Bronze medal – third place	1975 Olang	Men's singles

Hans Rinn (born 19 March 1953 in Langewiesen, Bezirk Suhl) is an East German former luger who competed from the early 1970s to the early 1980s. He won three medals at the Winter Olympics, including two gold (doubles: 1976, 1980) and one bronze (singles: 1976).

Rinn also won eight medals at the FIL World Luge Championships with four golds (singles: 1973, 1977, doubles: 1975, 1977), three silvers (singles: 1974, doubles: 1973, 1979), and one bronze (1978).

At the FIL European Luge Championships, Rinn won 13 medals. This included seven golds (Men's singles: 1973, 1974, 1979; Men's doubles: 1973, 1975, 1978, 1980), six silvers (Men's singles: 1977, 1978; Men's doubles: 1974, 1977, 1979, 1982), and one bronze (Men's singles: 1975).

Rinn was inducted into the International Luge Federation Hall of Fame in 2005 along with Josef Feistmantl.
