= Anton Winkler =

West German luger (1954–2016)

Medal record

Men's luge

Representing West Germany

Olympic Games
Bronze medal – third place	1980 Lake Placid	Men's singles

World Championships
Silver medal – second place	1978 Imst	Men's singles
Bronze medal – third place	1977 Igls	Men's singles
Bronze medal – third place	1979 Königssee	Men's doubles

World Cup Championships
Gold medal – first place	1977-78	Men's singles

European Championships
Gold medal – first place	1977 Königssee	Men's singles

Anton Winkler (23 February 1954 – 8 October 2016) was a West German luger who competed during the late 1970s and early 1980s. He won the bronze medal in the men's singles event at the 1980 Winter Olympics in Lake Placid, New York.

Winkler also won three medals at the FIL World Luge Championships with a silver (singles: 1978) and two bronzes (singles: 1977, doubles: 1979). Additionally, he won a gold medal in the men's singles event at the 1977 FIL European Luge Championships in Königssee, West Germany. Winkler was the first men's singles Luge World Cup overall champion in 1977–78.

Winkler died on 8 October 2016.
