= Michael Köhler (luger) =

German luger (born 1944)

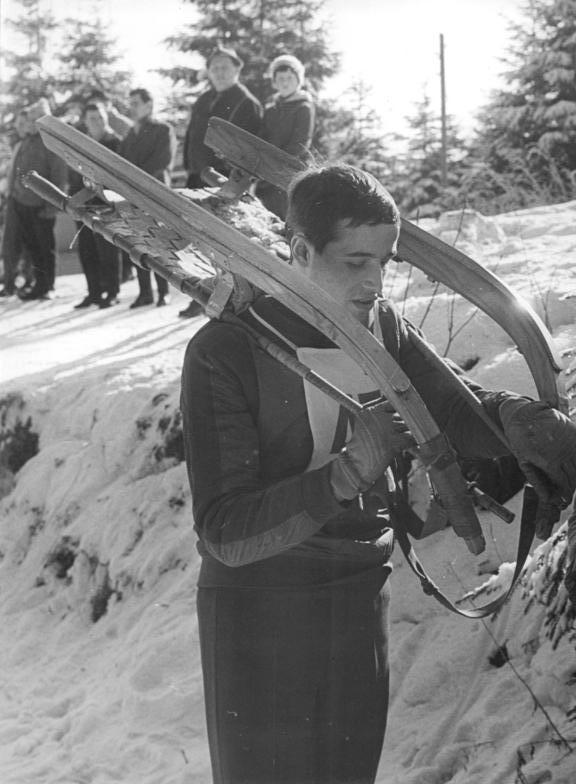
- Köhler at the East-German championships in 1964

Personal information
- Born: February 26, 1944 (age 82) Zwikau, Germany
- Occupation: Luger
Medal record
Luge
Representing East Germany
World Championships
Gold medal – first place	1965 Davos	Men's doubles
Silver medal – second place	1970 Königssee	Men's doubles
Bronze medal – third place	1969 Königssee	Men's doubles

Michael Köhler (born 26 February 1944) was an East German luger who competed in the late 1960s and early 1970s. He won two medals in the men's doubles event at the FIL World Luge Championships with a silver in 1970 and a bronze in 1969.

Köhler was a Free German Youth member of the fifth Volkskammer.
