= Ashley Walden =

American luger

Medal record

Luge

Representing the United States

World Championships
| Silver medal – second place | 2004 Nagano | Mixed team |
| Silver medal – second place | 2005 Park City | Mixed team |

Ashley Walden (née Hayden; born November 5, 1981, in Framingham, Massachusetts) is an American luger who competed from 1998-2011. She won two silver medals in the mixed team event at the FIL World Luge Championships (2004, 2005).

Hayden also finished eighth in the women's singles event at the 2002 Winter Olympics in Salt Lake City. Her best result in the Luge World Cup was a third place at Winterberg in 2005. In addition she won ten consecutive US national luge start championships in a row.

In 2006, she married luger Bengt Walden, a naturalized American citizen originally from Sweden. For NBC Sports at the 2010 Winter Olympics in Vancouver, she worked as a researcher for the luge events. She announced her retirement from competition in December 2011. In May 2014 the United States Bobsled and Skeleton Federation announced that Walden had been appointed as the federation's director of internal operations.
