= Helene Thurner =

Austrian luger

Medal record

Luge

Representing Austria

Olympic Games
| Bronze medal – third place | 1964 Innsbruck | Women's singles |

World Championships
| Silver medal – second place | 1963 Imst | Women's singles |
| Bronze medal – third place | 1961 Girenbad | Women's singles |
| Bronze medal – third place | 1967 Hammarstrand | Women's singles |

European Championships
| Silver medal – second place | 1962 Weissenbach | Women's singles |

Helene "Leni" Thurner (born 12 August 1938 in Zams) is an Austrian luger who competed during the 1960s. She won the bronze medal in the women's singles event at the 1964 Winter Olympics in Innsbruck. She also competed at the 1968 Winter Olympics.

Thurner also won three medals in the women's singles event at the FIL World Luge Championships with a silver (1963) and two bronzes (1961, 1967).

She also won a silver medal in the women's singles at the 1962 FIL European Luge Championships in Weissenbach, Austria.
