= Sergey Danilin =

Russian luger (1960–2021)

Medal record

Luge

Representing Soviet Union

Olympic Games
Silver medal – second place	1984 Sarajevo	Men's singles

World Championships
Gold medal – first place	1981 Hammarstrand	Men's singles
Silver medal – second place	1983 Lake Placid	Men's singles
Bronze medal – third place	1987 Igls	Men's singles
Bronze medal – third place	1989 Winterberg	Mixed team
Bronze medal – third place	1990 Calgary	Mixed team

European Championships
Gold medal – first place	1986 Hammarstrand	Men's singles
Silver medal – second place	1982 Winterberg	Men's singles

Sergey Danilin (1 January 1960 – 4 October 2021) was a Soviet luger who competed from the early 1980s to the mid-1990s. Competing in four Winter Olympics, he earned a silver medal in the men's singles event at Sarajevo in 1984.

Danilin also won a complete set of medals in the men's singles event at the FIL World Luge Championships with a gold in 1981, a silver in 1983, and a bronze in 1987. He also won a pair of bronze medals in the mixed team event (1989, 1990). He also won two medals in the men's singles event at the FIL European Luge Championships (gold in 1986 and silver in 1982). His best finish in the overall men's singles Luge World Cup was second twice (1981–2, 1982–3).

In 1986, Danilin married fellow Soviet luger Nadejda Danilina, who competed in the late 1980s.

Danilin died on 4 October 2021, at the age of 61.
