= Wolfgang Scheidel =

East German luger (born 1943)

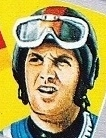
- Scheidel on a 1972 postage stamp

Personal information
- Born: 1 March 1943 (age 83) Erfurt, Germany
- Height: 183 cm (6 ft 0 in)
- Weight: 90 kg (198 lb)

Sport
- Sport: Luge
- Club: ASK Vorwärts Oberhof
Medal record
Representing East Germany
Olympic Games
Gold medal – first place	1972 Sapporo	Singles
World championships
Gold medal – first place	1965 Davos	Doubles
Bronze medal – third place	1969 Königssee	Singles
Bronze medal – third place	1970 Königssee	Singles
European Championships
Silver medal – second place	1970 Hammarstrand	Singles
Silver medal – second place	1971 Imst	Singles

Wolfgang Scheidel (born 1 March 1943) is an East German former luger who won the gold medal in the men's singles event at the 1972 Winter Olympics in Sapporo. He also won three medals at the FIL World Luge Championships with one gold in the men's doubles (1965) and two bronzes in the men's singles (1969, 1970). He won a pair of silver medals in the men's singles event at the FIL European Luge Championships (1970, 1971).

After retiring from competitions Scheidel trained young lugers at ASK Oberhof until 1977, and after that worked as a sports instructor in a recreation home of the National People's Army. After the German reunification he ran an oxygen station in his home town of Ilmenau.
