= Ewald Walch =

Austrian luger (1940–2023)

Medal record

Luge

Olympic Games
| Silver medal – second place | 1968 Grenoble | Men's doubles |

World Championships
| Gold medal – first place | 1960 Garmisch-Partenkirchen | Men's doubles |
| Gold medal – first place | 1969 Königssee | Men's doubles |
| Gold medal – first place | 1970 Königssee | Men's doubles |
| Silver medal – second place | 1967 Hammarstrand | Men's doubles |
| Silver medal – second place | 1971 Olang | Men's doubles |
| Bronze medal – third place | 1957 Davos | Men's doubles |
| Bronze medal – third place | 1963 Imst | Men's doubles |

European Championships
| Gold medal – first place | 1962 Weissenbach | Men's doubles |
| Silver medal – second place | 1971 Imst | Men's doubles |
| Bronze medal – third place | 1970 Hammarstrand | Men's doubles |

Ewald Walch (18 August 1940 – 27 October 2023) was an Austrian luger who competed from the mid-1950s to the early 1970s. Competing in two Winter Olympics, he won the silver medal in the men's doubles event at the 1968 Winter Olympics in Grenoble.

Walch also won seven medals in the men's doubles event at the FIL World Luge Championships with three golds (1960, 1969, 1970), two silvers (1967, 1971), and two bronzes (1957, 1963). He also won a complete set of medals in the men's doubles event at the FIL European Luge Championships with a gold in 1962, a silver in 1971, and a bronze in 1970.

Walch died on 27 October 2023, at the age of 83.
