= FIL World Luge Championships 1967 =

1967 Championship event

The FIL World Luge Championships 1967 took place in Hammarstrand, Sweden, between 18 and 19 February 1967. This event was held following the cancellation of the previous year's championships in Friedrichroda, East Germany, which was the last cancellation in the history of the world championships.

== Men's singles ==
Medal	Athlete	Time
Gold	Thomas Köhler (GDR)	
Silver	Klaus Bonsack (GDR)	
Bronze	Josef Feistmantl (AUT)	

== Women's singles ==
Medal	Athlete	Time
Gold	Ortrun Enderlein (GDR)	
Silver	Petra Tierlich (GDR)	
Bronze	Helene Thurner (AUT)	

== Men's doubles ==
Medal	Athlete	Time
Gold	East Germany (Klaus Bonsack, Thomas Köhler)	
Silver	Austria (Manfred Schmid, Ewald Walch)	
Bronze	Italy (Siegfried Maier, Ernesto Maier)	

== Medal table ==
Rank	Nation	Gold	Silver	Bronze	Total
1	East Germany (GDR)	3	2	0	5
2	Austria (AUT)	0	1	2	3
3	Italy (ITA)	0	0	1	1
Totals (3 entries)		3	3	3	9
