= Karl Brunner (luger) =

Italian luger (born 1951)

Medal record

Luge

Olympic Games
Silver medal – second place	1980 Lake Placid	Men's doubles

World Championships
Gold medal – first place	1971 Olang	Men's singles
Silver medal – second place	1977 Igls	Men's doubles
Silver medal – second place	1979 Königssee	Men's singles

European Championships
Gold medal – first place	1980 Olang	Men's singles
Bronze medal – third place	1977 Königssee	Men's singles
Bronze medal – third place	1979 Oberhof	Men's doubles

Karl Brunner (born 19 May 1951 in Olang) is an Italian luger who competed from the early 1970s to the mid-1980s. He won the silver medal in the men's doubles event at the 1980 Winter Olympics in Lake Placid, New York.

Brunner also won three medals at the FIL World Luge Championships with two medals in men's singles (gold: 1971, silver: 1979) and one in men's doubles (silver: 1977). He also won three medals at the FIL European Luge Championships with a gold (Men's singles: 1980) and two bronzes (Men's singles: 1977, Men's doubles: 1979).

Brunner also won the overall Luge World Cup men's doubles title three times (1977-8, 1978-9, 1982-3) and had his best overall men's single World Cup finish of second in 1979-80.
