= Robert Manzenreiter =

Austrian luger (born 1966)

Medal record

Luge

World Championships
Silver medal – second place	1991 Winterberg	Mixed team
Silver medal – second place	1993 Calgary	Mixed team

Robert Manzenreiter (born August 28, 1966 in Innsbruck) is an Austrian luger who competed during the late 1980s and early 1990s. He won two silver medals in the mixed team event at the FIL World Luge Championships (1991, 1993).

Manzenreiter also finished sixth in the men's singles event at the 1992 Winter Olympics in Albertville. As of 2007, he is training coordinator for the Austria luge team.
