= Thomas Schwab =

German luger (born 1962)

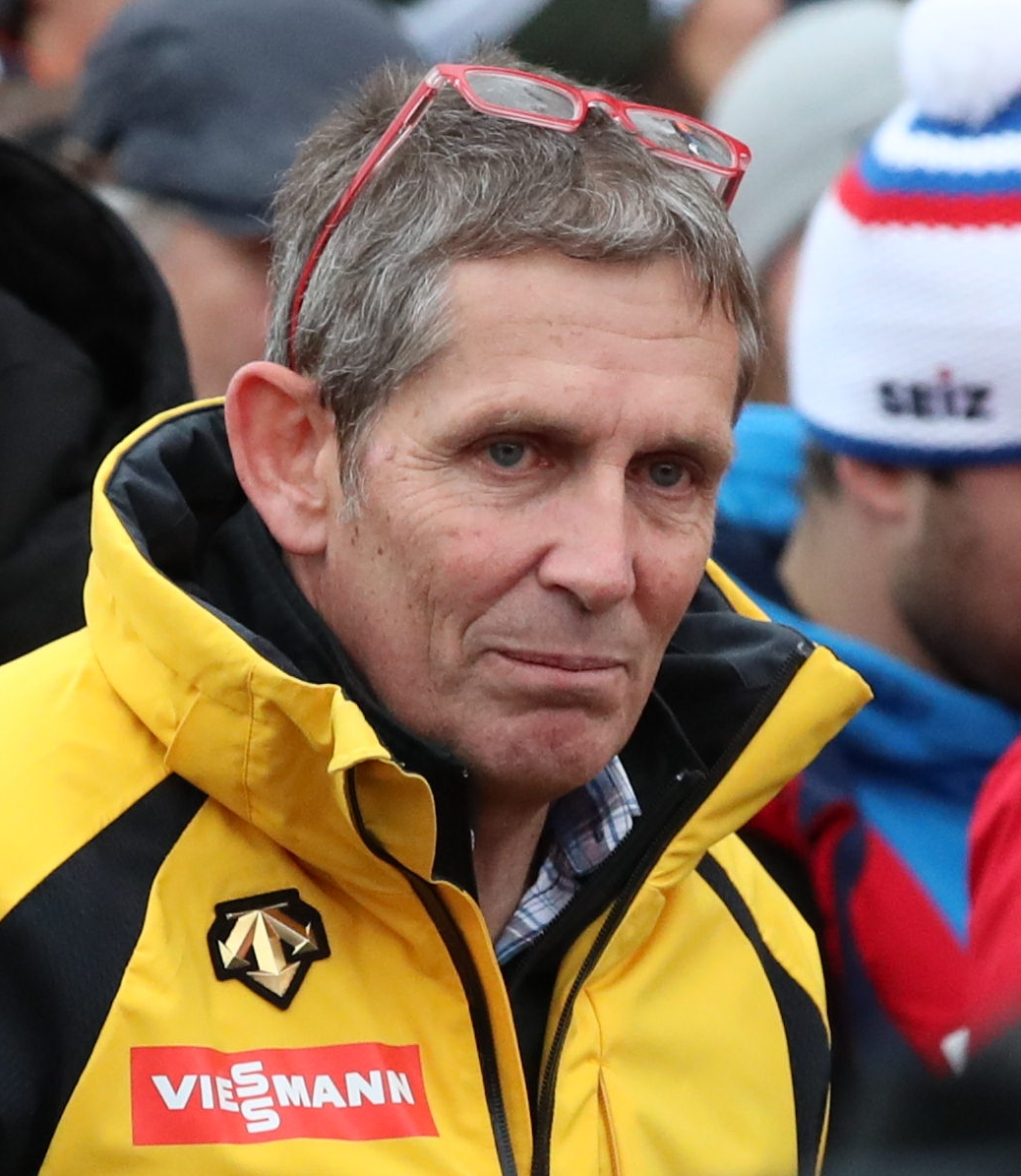

Medal record

Men's Luge

Representing West Germany

Olympic Games
Bronze medal – third place	1988 Calgary	Men's doubles

World Championships
Bronze medal – third place	1987 Igls	Men's doubles

World Cup Championships
Gold medal – first place	1986-87	Men's doubles
Silver medal – second place	1985-86	Men's doubles
Bronze medal – third place	1982-83	Men's doubles

European Championships
Gold medal – first place	1988 Königssee	Men's doubles
Gold medal – first place	1988 Königssee	Mixed team

Thomas Schwab (born 20 April 1962 in Berchtesgaden, Bavaria) is a West German luger who competed in the late 1980s. Together with Wolfgang Staudinger he won the bronze medal in the men's doubles event at the 1988 Winter Olympics in Calgary, representing West Germany.

Schwab also won a bronze medal in the men's doubles event at the 1987 FIL World Luge Championships in Igls, Austria. He also won two gold medals at the 1988 FIL European Luge Championships in Königssee, West Germany (Men's doubles and mixed team). Schwab won the overall Luge World Cup men's doubles title in 1986–7.

From 1994 to 2008, he was head coach of all male and female lugers of Germany's A-Group, succeeding Josef Lenz at this position. Since the 1994 Winter Olympics, his athletes have won a total of 129 medals in the Winter Olympics, world championships, and European championships. In February 2008, Schwab was named secretary general and sports director for the German bobsleigh and luge federation (BSD), effective in May. He was replaced as head coach of the German luge team by Norbert Loch, father of 2008 men's single world champion Felix.
