= Elisabeth Demleitner =

German luger

Medal record

Women's Luge

Representing West Germany

Olympic Games
Bronze medal – third place	1976 Innsbruck	Women's singles

World Championships
Gold medal – first place	1971 Olang	Women's singles
Silver medal – second place	1974 Königssee	Women's singles
Silver medal – second place	1979 Königssee	Women's singles
Bronze medal – third place	1970 Königssee	Women's singles

European Championships
Gold medal – first place	1977 Königssee	Women's singles
Gold medal – first place	1978 Hammarstrand	Women's singles
Silver medal – second place	1972 Königssee	Women's singles

Elisabeth Demleitner (born 23 September 1952 in Kochel am See) is a West German luger who competed during the 1970s and early 1980s. Competing in three Winter Olympics, she won the bronze medal in the women's singles event at the 1976 Winter Olympics in Innsbruck.

Demleitner also won four medals in the women's singles event at the FIL World Luge Championships with one gold (1971), two silvers (1974, 1979), and one bronze (1970). Additionally, she won three medals in the women's singles event at the FIL European Luge Championships with two golds (1977, 1978) and one silver (1972).
