= Jochen Pietzsch =

East German luger (born 1963)

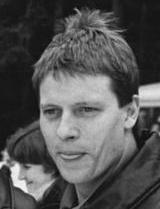
- Pietzsch in 1984

Personal information
- Born: 1 December 1963 (age 62) Halle (Saale), East Germany
- Spouse: Kerstin Mohring
Medal record
Men's Luge
Representing East Germany
Representing Germany
Olympic Games
| Gold medal – first place | 1988 Calgary | Men's doubles |
| Bronze medal – third place | 1984 Sarajevo | Men's doubles |
World Championships
| Gold medal – first place | 1983 Lake Placid | Men's doubles |
| Gold medal – first place | 1985 Oberhof | Men's doubles |
| Gold medal – first place | 1987 Igls | Men's doubles |
| Gold medal – first place | 1990 Calgary | Mixed team |
| Bronze medal – third place | 1989 Winterberg | Men's doubles |
| Bronze medal – third place | 1990 Calgary | Men's doubles |
World Cup Championships
| Gold medal – first place | 1983–84 | Men's doubles |
| Bronze medal – third place | 1988–89 | Men's doubles |
European Championships
| Gold medal – first place | 1990 Igls | Men's doubles |
| Gold medal – first place | 1990 Igls | Mixed team |
| Silver medal – second place | 1986 Hammarstrand | Men's doubles |

Jochen Pietzsch (born 1 December 1963 in Halle, Saxony-Anhalt) is a former East German luger who competed during the mid-1980s. Together with Jörg Hoffmann, he won two medals in the men's doubles event with a gold in 1988 and a bronze in 1984.

Pietzsch also found great success at the FIL World Luge Championships with a total of six medals, including four gold (Men's doubles: 1983, 1985, 1987; Mixed team: 1990) and two bronzes (Men's doubles: 1989, 1990). He also won three medals at the FIL European Luge Championships with two golds (Men's doubles and mixed team: both 1990) and one silver (Men's doubles: 1986).

Pietzsch won the overall Luge World Cup title in men's doubles in 1983–84. He married cross-country skier Kerstin Mohring.
