= Vera Zozulya =

Latvian luger

Medal record

Women's luge

Representing the Soviet Union

Olympic Games
Gold medal – first place	1980 Lake Placid	Women's singles

World Championships
Gold medal – first place	1978 Imst	Women's singles
Silver medal – second place	1977 Igls	Women's singles
Bronze medal – third place	1981 Hammarstrand	Women's singles

European Championships
Gold medal – first place	1976 Hammarstrand	Women's singles
Bronze medal – third place	1978 Hammarstrand	Women's singles

Vera Zozulya (Latvian: Vera Zozuļa, Russian: Вера Васильевна Зозуля; born 15 January 1956 in Talsi, Latvian SSR) is a Latvian luger who represented the Soviet Union at the international level and competed during the late 1970s and early 1980s. Competing in two Winter Olympics, she won the gold medal in the women's singles event at the 1980 Winter Olympics in Lake Placid, New York.

Zozulya also won a complete set of medals in the women's singles event at the FIL World Luge Championships with a gold in 1978, a silver in 1977, and a bronze in 1981.

At the FIL European Luge Championships, she won two medals in the women's singles event with a gold in 1976 and a bronze in 1978. She won the overall women's singles Luge World Cup title in 1981-2.

Zozulya later became a coach for lugers in the Soviet Union, Latvia, and Poland. She was inducted into the International Luge Federation Hall of Fame in 2006.
