= Hans Plenk =

German luger (1938–2023)

Medal record

Men's luge

Representing Germany

Olympic Games
Bronze medal – third place	1964 Innsbruck	Singles

Representing West Germany

World Championships
Gold medal – first place	1965 Davos	Singles
Silver medal – second place	1961 Girenbad	Singles
Silver medal – second place	1963 Imst	Singles
Bronze medal – third place	1960 Garmisch-Partenkirchen	Singles
Bronze medal – third place	1960 Garmisch-Partenkirchen	Doubles

Hans Plenk (21 February 1938 – 10 September 2023) was a West German luger who competed during the 1960s.

== Biography ==
Hans Plenk was born in Berchtesgaden on 21 February 1938.

Plenk won the bronze medal in the men's singles event at the 1964 Winter Olympics in Innsbruck.

Plenk won five medals at the FIL World Luge Championships with four medals in the men's singles (gold: 1965, silver: 1961, 1963; bronze: 1960) and one in the men's doubles event (bronze: 1960).

Hans Plenk died on 10 September 2023, at the age of 85.
