= Josef Feistmantl =

Austrian luger (1939–2019)

Medal record

Luge

Olympic Games
Gold medal – first place	1964 Innsbruck	Men's doubles

World Championships
Gold medal – first place	1969 Königssee	Men's singles
Silver medal – second place	1959 Villard-de-Lans	Men's singles
Silver medal – second place	1970 Königssee	Men's singles
Bronze medal – third place	1967 Hammarstrand	Men's singles
Bronze medal – third place	1971 Olang	Men's singles

European Championships
Gold medal – first place	1967 Königssee	Men's doubles
Silver medal – second place	1962 Weissenbach	Men's doubles

Josef Feistmantl (23 February 1939 – 10 March 2019) was an Austrian luger who competed from the mid-1950s to the early 1970s. He competed at three Olympic Games.

== Biography ==
Feistmantl was born in Absam. Competing in two Winter Olympics, he won the gold medal in the men's doubles event at the 1964 Winter Olympics in Innsbruck along with Manfred Stengl.

Feistmantl also won five medals in the men's singles event at the FIL World Luge Championships with one gold (1969 - the first Worlds to be held on an artificial track, at Königssee), two silvers (1959, 1970), and two bronzes (1967, 1971). He also won two medals in the men's doubles event at the FIL European Luge Championships with one gold (1967) and one silver (1962). After his 1969 World Championship win, he donated the medal to the Polish team after their luger Stanisław Paczka had been killed whilst in competition at the Championships: Feistmantl stated that he "wanted to set a positive example". That year the International Olympic Committee awarded him a Fair Play Prize for his gesture.

At the opening ceremonies of the 1976 Winter Olympics, Feistmantl and fellow Austrian alpine skier Christl Haas were lighters of separate Olympic Flames as defined by Innsbruck's hosting of their second Winter Olympics. He subsequently cited this as his fondest memory.

Feistmantl was inducted into the International Luge Federation Hall of Fame in 2005 along with Hans Rinn.

Olympic Games
Preceded by Günther Zahn	Final Olympic torchbearer Innsbruck 1976; With: Christl Haas	Succeeded by Stéphane Préfontaine and Sandra Henderson
Preceded by Hideo Takada	Final Winter Olympic torchbearer Innsbruck 1976; With: Christl Haas	Succeeded by Charles Gugino
