= Tony Benshoof =

American luger (born 1975)

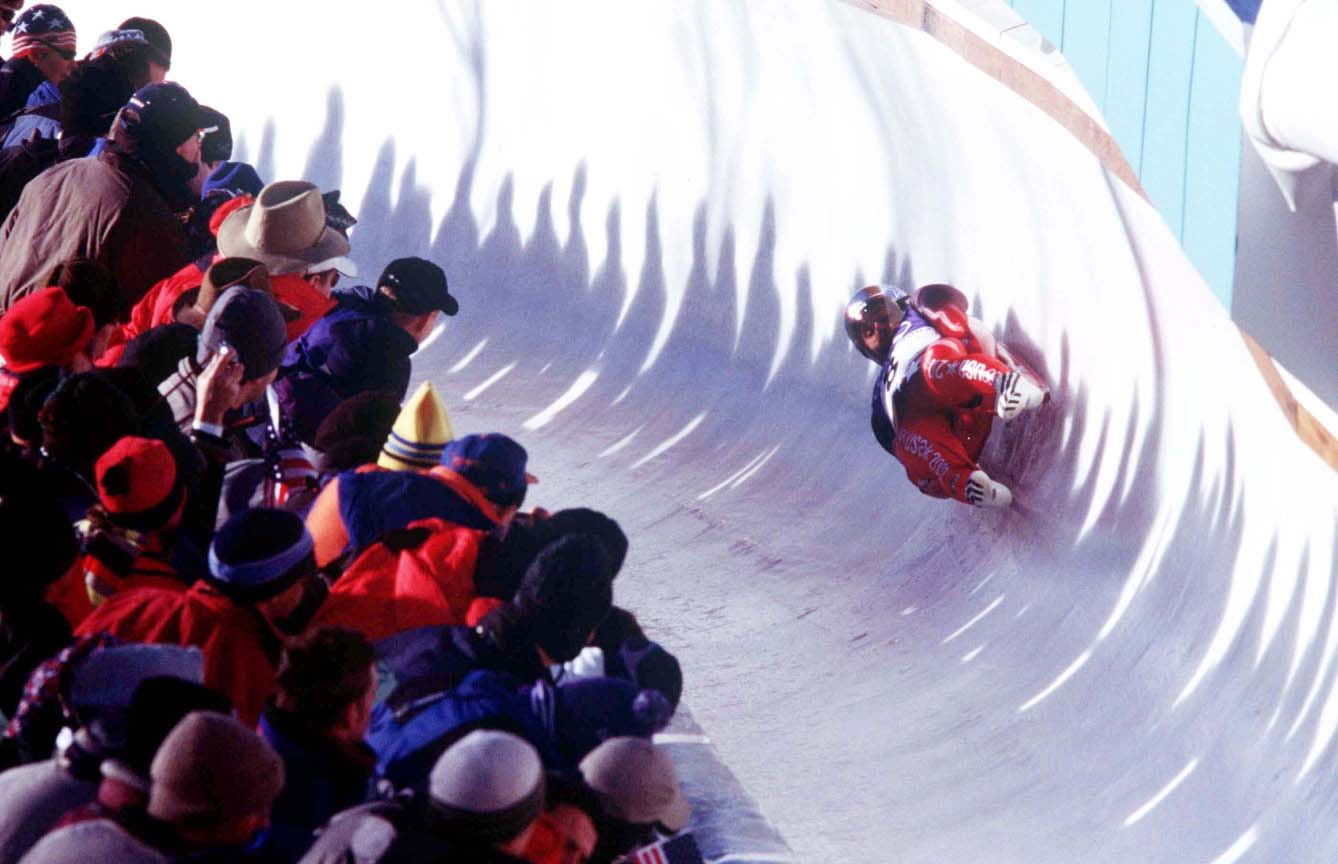
- Benshoof at 2002 Olympics

Personal information
- Full name: Antony Lee Benshoof
- Born: July 7, 1975 (age 51) Saint Paul, Minnesota, U.S.

Sport
- Country: United States
- Sport: Luge
Medal record
World Championships
Silver medal – second place	2004 Nagano	Mixed team
Silver medal – second place	2005 Park City	Mixed team
Bronze medal – third place	2001 Calgary	Mixed team
World Cup Championships
Bronze medal – third place	2005-06	Men's singles
World Junior Championships
Silver medal – second place	1995 Lake Placid	Men's doubles
Bronze medal – third place	1995 Lake Placid	Men's singles

Antony Lee "Tony" Benshoof (born July 7, 1975) is an American luger from White Bear Lake, Minnesota who has been competing since 1990. He won three medals in the mixed team event at the FIL World Luge Championships with two silvers (2004, 2005) and one bronze (2001).

Benshoof was born in Saint Paul, Minnesota. Competing in three Winter Olympics, Benshoof earned his best finish of fourth by .153 seconds in the men's singles event at Turin in 2006. He was the highest Olympic finisher for any USA Luge athlete in Men's Singles Luge prior to Chris Mazdzer's silver medal in the 2018 Pyeong Chang olympics. Benshoof also holds records for most international medals won (37) by any USA Men's Singles athlete and most US National titles won. Every medal Benshoof won was under head coach Wolfgang Schädler (1985–2010).

On October 16, 2001, Benshoof became the Guinness World Record holder for fastest speed on a luge sled at 86.6 mph (139.4 km/h) at the bobsleigh, luge, and skeleton track in Park City, Utah, used for the 2002 Winter Olympics.

His best Luge World Cup overall finish was third in men's singles in 2005-6.
