= Hans Brandner =

German luger (born 1949)

Medal record

Men's Luge

Representing West Germany

Olympic Games
Silver medal – second place	1976 Innsbruck	Men's doubles

World Championships
Gold medal – first place	1979 Königssee	Men's doubles
Bronze medal – third place	1977 Igls	Men's doubles

World Cup Championships
Silver medal – second place	1977-78	Men's doubles
Bronze medal – third place	1978-79	Men's doubles

European Championships
Gold medal – first place	1977 Königssee	Men's doubles
Silver medal – second place	1972 Königssee	Men's doubles
Bronze medal – third place	1973 Königssee	Men's doubles
Bronze medal – third place	1980 Olang	Men's doubles

Hans Brandner (born 19 February 1949 in Berchtesgaden, Bavaria) is a German former luger who competed for West Germany from the early 1970s to the early 1980s. Competing in three Winter Olympics, He won the silver medal in the men's doubles event at Innsbruck in 1976.

Brandner also won two medals at the men's doubles event at the FIL World Luge Championships with a gold in 1979 and a bronze in 1977. He also won four medals in the men's doubles event at the FIL European Luge Championships with one gold (1977), one silver (1972), and two bronzes (1973, 1980).

Brandner's best overall finish in the men's doubles Luge World Cup was second in the inaugural 1977–8 season.

Later he managed with his wife the "Hochkalter" hotel (named after the nearby Hochkalter mountains) in Ramsau near Berchtesgaden.
