= Petra Tierlich =

German luger

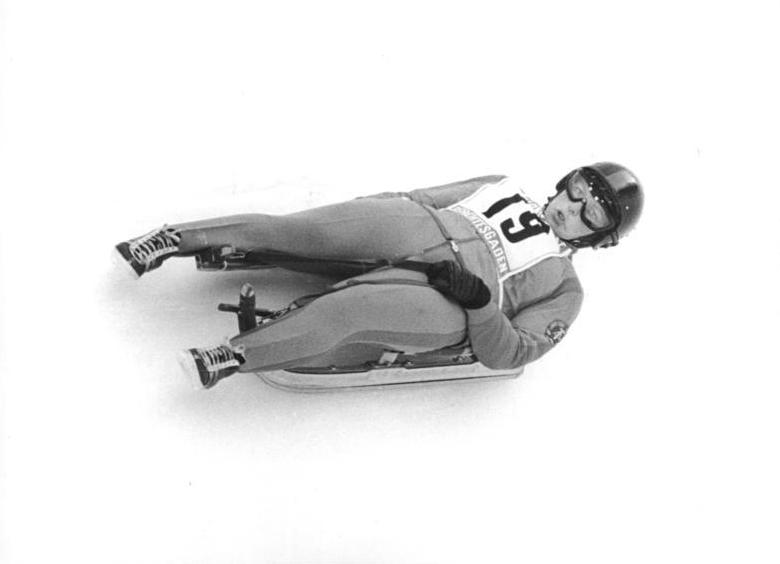
- Tierlich 1969 at the training in Königssee.

Medal record

Luge

World Championships
Gold medal – first place	1969 Königssee	Women's singles
Silver medal – second place	1965 Davos	Women's singles
Silver medal – second place	1967 Hammarstrand	Women's singles

Petra Tierlich (born 25 February 1945), is an East German luger who competed in the 1960s. She won three medals in the women's singles event at the FIL World Luge Championships with a gold in 1969 and two silvers in 1965 and 1967.
