= Torsten Wustlich =

German luger (born 1977)

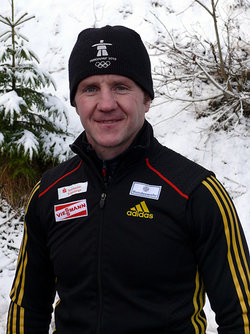

Medal record

Men's luge

Representing Germany

Olympic Games
Silver medal – second place	2006 Turin	Men's doubles

World Championships
Gold medal – first place	2001 Calgary	Men's doubles
Gold medal – first place	2005 Park City	Men's doubles
Gold medal – first place	2005 Park City	Mixed team
Gold medal – first place	2008 Oberhof	Men's doubles
Gold medal – first place	2008 Oberhof	Mixed team
Gold medal – first place	2009 Lake Placid	Mixed team
Silver medal – second place	1999 Königssee	Mixed team
Silver medal – second place	2004 Nagano	Men's doubles
Silver medal – second place	2009 Lake Placid	Men's doubles

World Cup Championships
Gold medal – first place	2009–10	Men's doubles
Silver medal – second place	2000–01	Men's doubles
Silver medal – second place	2003–04	Men's doubles
Silver medal – second place	2004–05	Men's doubles
Bronze medal – third place	2005–06	Men's doubles

Torsten Wustlich (born 2 February 1977 in Annaberg-Buchholz, Saxony) is a German former luger who competed from 1998 to 2010. Together with André Florschütz, he won the silver medal in the men's doubles event at the 2006 Winter Olympics in Turin.

Wustlich also won nine medals at the FIL World Luge Championships with six golds (Men's doubles: 2001, 2005, 2008; Mixed team: 2005, 2008, 2009) and three silvers (Men's doubles: 2004, 2009; Mixed team: 1999).

His best overall finish at the FIL European Luge Championships was fifth in the men's doubles event twice (2004, 2008).

Wustlich's best overall finish in the men's doubles Luge World Cup was second three times (2000-1, 2003-4, 2004-5).
