= Horst Müller =

German luger

Medal record

Luge

World Championships
Silver medal – second place	1975 Hammarstrand	Men's doubles
Silver medal – second place	1977 Igls	Men's singles
Bronze medal – third place	1974 Königssee	Men's singles

European Championships
Silver medal – second place	1975 Olang	Men's doubles

Horst Müller was an East German luger who competed during the mid-1970s. He won three medals at the FIL World Luge Championships with two silvers (singles: 1977, doubles: 1975) and a bronze (singles: 1974).

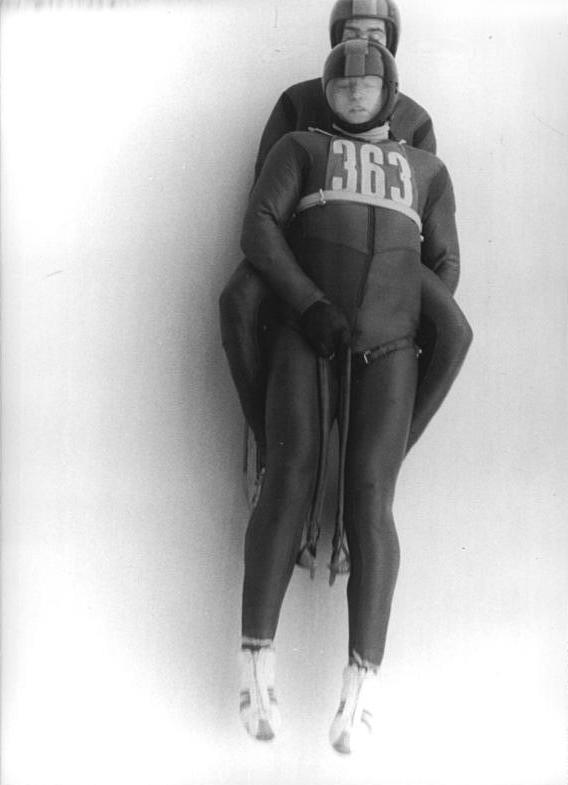
Müller/Neumann winning the East-German Championships in 1975

Müller also won a silver medal in the men's doubles event at the 1975 FIL European Luge Championships in Olang, Italy.

== Links ==
- Hickok sports information on World champions in luge and skeleton.
- List of European luge champions (in German)
