= Manfred Schmid =

Austrian luger (born 1944)

Medal record

Men's Luge

Representing Austria

Olympic Games
Gold medal – first place	1968 Grenoble	Men's singles
Silver medal – second place	1968 Grenoble	Men's doubles

World Championships
Gold medal – first place	1969 Königssee	Men's doubles
Gold medal – first place	1970 Königssee	Men's doubles
Silver medal – second place	1967 Hammarstrand	Men's doubles
Silver medal – second place	1969 Königssee	Men's singles
Silver medal – second place	1971 Olang	Men's doubles
Silver medal – second place	1975 Hammarstrand	Men's singles
Bronze medal – third place	1978 Imst	Men's singles

European Championships
Silver medal – second place	1971 Imst	Men's doubles
Silver medal – second place	1974 Imst	Men's singles
Bronze medal – third place	1970 Hammarstrand	Men's doubles
Bronze medal – third place	1971 Imst	Men's singles
Bronze medal – third place	1973 Königssee	Men's singles

Manfred Schmid (born 6 June 1944 in Liezen) is an Austrian former luger who competed from the mid-1960s to the late 1970s. Competing in four Winter Olympics, he won two medals at Grenoble in 1968 with a gold in the men's singles event and a silver in the men's doubles event.

Schmid also won seven medals at the FIL World Luge Championships with two gold (doubles: 1969, 1970), four silvers (singles: 1969, 1975; doubles: 1967, 1971), and one bronze (singles: 1978). He won five medals at the FIL European Luge Championships with two silvers (Men's singles: 1974, Men's doubles: 1971) and three bronzes (Men's singles: 1971, 1973; Men's doubles: 1970).

Schmid finished third in the overall Luge World Cup men's singles championship in 1977–78.
