= Norbert Hahn =

East German luger (born 1954)

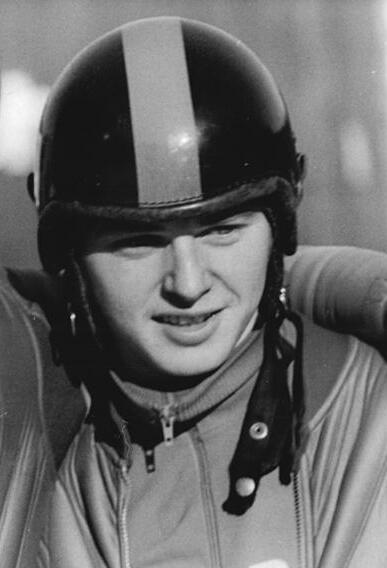
- Hahn in 1974
Medal record
Men's Luge
Representing East Germany
Olympic Games
Gold medal – first place	1976 Innsbruck	Men's doubles
Gold medal – first place	1980 Lake Placid	Men's doubles
World Championships
Gold medal – first place	1975 Hammarstrand	Men's doubles
Gold medal – first place	1977 Igls	Men's doubles
Silver medal – second place	1973 Oberhof	Men's doubles
Silver medal – second place	1979 Königssee	Men's doubles
Bronze medal – third place	1978 Imst	Men's doubles
European Championships
Gold medal – first place	1973 Königssee	Men's doubles
Gold medal – first place	1975 Olang	Men's doubles
Gold medal – first place	1978 Hammarstrand	Men's doubles
Gold medal – first place	1980 Olang	Men's doubles
Silver medal – second place	1974 Imst	Men's doubles
Silver medal – second place	1977 Königssee	Men's doubles
Silver medal – second place	1979 Oberhof	Men's doubles

Norbert Hahn (born 6 January 1954 in Elbingerode, Saxony-Anhalt) is a German former luger who competed from the mid-1970s to the early 1980s. He won two medals at the Winter Olympics in the men's doubles event (1976, 1980).

Hahn also won five medals in the men's doubles event at the FIL World Luge Championships with two golds (1975, 1977), two silvers (1973, 1979), and one bronze (1978). He also won seven medals in the men's doubles event at the FIL European Luge Championships with four golds (1973, 1975, 1978, 1980) and three silvers (1974, 1977, 1979).
