= Wolfgang Staudinger =

German luger (born 1963)

Medal record

Men's Luge

Representing West Germany

Olympic Games
Bronze medal – third place	1988 Calgary	Men's doubles

World Championships
Bronze medal – third place	1987 Igls	Men's doubles

World Cup Championships
Gold medal – first place	1986-87	Men's doubles
Silver medal – second place	1985-86	Men's doubles
Bronze medal – third place	1982-83	Men's doubles

European Championships
Gold medal – first place	1988 Königssee	Men's doubles
Gold medal – first place	1988 Königssee	Mixed team

Wolfgang Staudinger (born 8 September 1963 in Berchtesgaden, Bavaria) is a West German luger who competed from 1978 to 1989. Together with Thomas Schwab he won the bronze medal in the men's doubles event at the 1988 Winter Olympics in Calgary.

Staudinger also won a bronze medal in the men's doubles event at the 1987 FIL World Luge Championships in Igls, Austria. He also won two gold medals at the 1988 FIL European Luge Championships in Königssee, West Germany (Men's doubles and mixed team). Staudinger won the overall Luge World Cup men's doubles title in 1986-7.

After retiring from luge, Staudinger became a coach in the sport for such lugers as Robert Fegg and Steffen Skel. In June 2007, he was named head coach of the Canadian luge team. Staudinger is married to Marie-Claude Doyon, who finished seventh in the women's singles event at the 1988 games in Calgary.
