= Josef Fendt =

German luger (born 1947)

Medal record

Men's Luge

Representing West Germany

Olympic Games
Silver medal – second place	1976 Innsbruck	Men's singles

World Championships
Gold medal – first place	1970 Königssee	Men's singles
Gold medal – first place	1974 Königssee	Men's singles

European Championships
Silver medal – second place	1973 Königssee	Men's singles

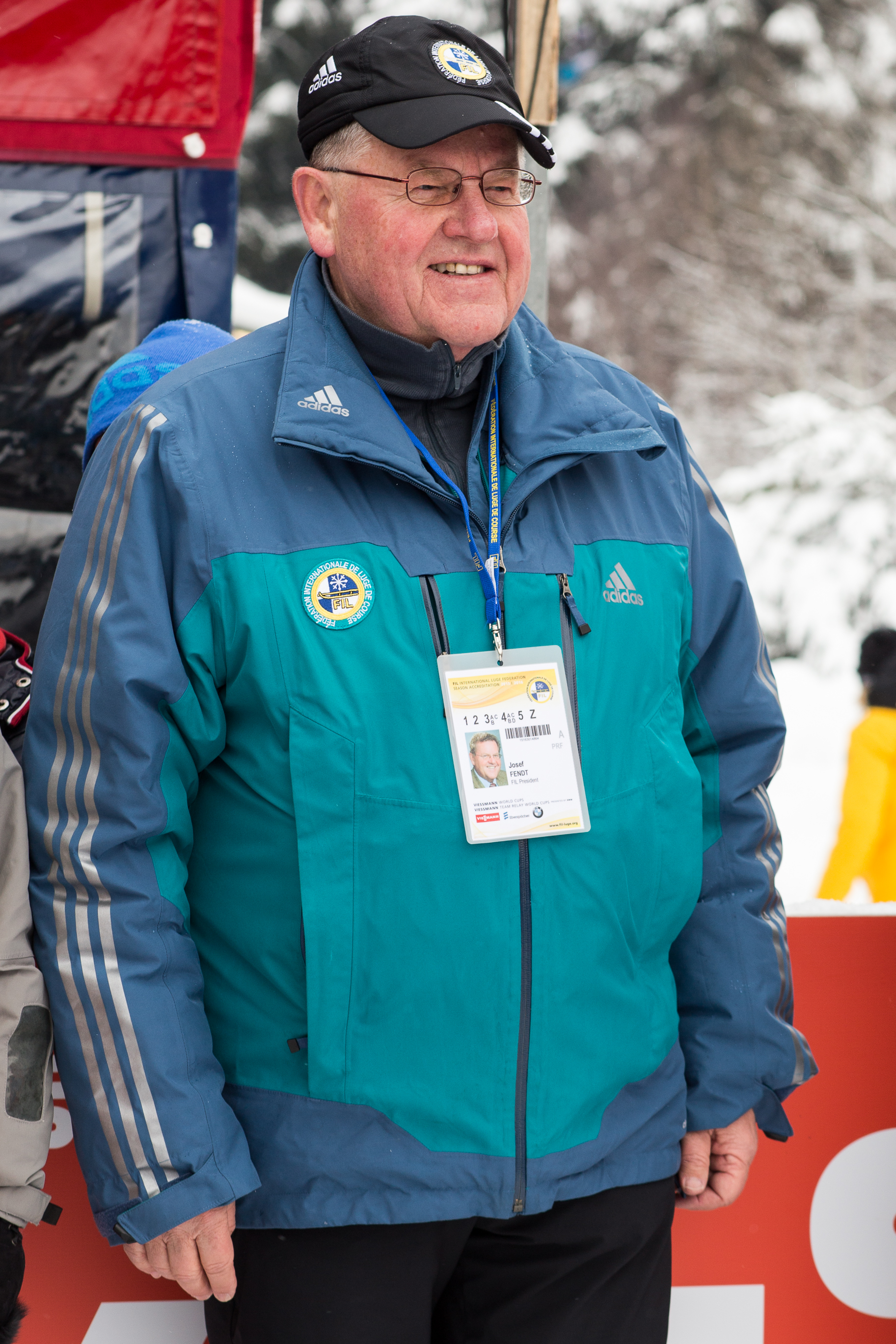
Josef Fendt in 2016

Josef Fendt (born 6 October 1947 in Berchtesgaden) is the immediate past president of the Fédération Internationale de Luge de Course (FIL), having served from 1994 to 2020. He was a West German-German luger who competed from the mid-1960s to the mid-1970s. Competing in two Winter Olympics, he won the silver medal in the men's singles event at Innsbruck in 1976.

Fendt also won two gold medals in the men's singles event at the FIL World Luge Championships, earning them in 1970 and 1974. Additionally, he won a silver medal in the men's singles event at the 1973 FIL European Luge Championships in Königssee, West Germany.

After his retirement from competitive luge, Fendt got active in the International Luge Federation (FIL), being named Vice-President Sport for Artificial Track in 1985, a position he stayed at until the death of FIL's first president Bert Isatitsch in February 1994. Fendt was appointed acting president of the FIL as a result, then elected full president in June of that year. He served until his 2020 retirement.

Fendt's sister, Andrea, won the silver medal in the women's singles event at the 1978 FIL World Luge Championships in Imst, Austria.

On Fendt's 61st birthday in Munich, he received the Bundesverdienstkreuz Verdienstkreuz am Bande (Cross of the Order of Merit of the Federal Republic of Germany) for his contributions toward society, mainly in luge.
