= Walter Plaikner =

Italian luger

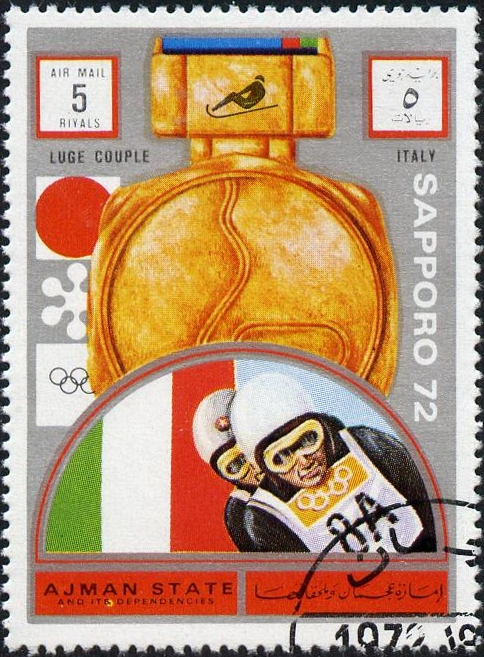
- Plaikner and Paul Hildgartner depicted on a 1972 postage stamp

Medal record

Men's Luge

Representing Italy

Olympic Games
Gold medal – first place	1972 Sapporo	Men's doubles

World Championships
Gold medal – first place	1971 Olang	Men's doubles
Bronze medal – third place	1973 Oberhof	Men's doubles

European Championships
Gold medal – first place	1971 Imst	Men's doubles
Gold medal – first place	1974 Imst	Men's doubles

Walter Plaikner (born 24 October 1951) is an Italian former luger and coach who competed in the late 1960s and early 1970s. He was a doubles specialist, and competed alongside Paul Hildgartner. They won the gold medal in the men's doubles event (shared with the East German pairing of Horst Hörnlein and Reinhard Bredow) at the 1972 Winter Olympics in Sapporo. Plaikner also competed at the 1976 Winter Olympics in Innsbruck, where he finished 11th in the doubles after suffering from a severe bout of flu. He retired from competition after the Games.

Born in Kiens, South Tyrol, Plaikner won two medals in the men's doubles events at the FIL World Luge Championships with a gold in 1971 and a bronze in 1973. He and Hildgartner also won two gold medals in the men's doubles event at the FIL European Luge Championships (1971, 1974).

After his retirement, Plaikner became a coach, working in Japan until 1998 and then in the United States to 2002. That year he was appointed as head coach of the Italian national luge team: he remained in this position until the end of April 2013, when he left the role after disputes about the quality of materials he produced for the construction of sleds. Later that year he became head coach of the Russian luge team with a focus on preparations for the 2014 Winter Olympics in Sochi, Russia. In 2016 he rejoined the coaching staff of the Italian team. In 2007, Plaikner was appointed Chairman of the Technical Commission for Artificial Track of the International Luge Federation (FIL).
