= Henning Schulze =

German luger

Medal record

Luge

World Championships
| Silver medal – second place | 1974 Königssee | Men's doubles |

Henning Schulze was an East German luger who competed in the mid-1970s. He won a silver medal in the men's doubles event at the 1974 FIL World Luge Championships in Königssee, West Germany.
