= FIL World Luge Championships 2004 =

Official logo of the FIL World Luge Championships 2004

The FIL World Luge Championships 2004 took place February 13-15, 2004 at the Spiral track in Nagano, Japan. This marked the first time the event took place in Asia.

== Men's singles ==
Medal	Athlete	Time
Gold	David Möller (GER)	1:39.150
Silver	Georg Hackl (GER)	+ 0.008
Bronze	Mārtiņš Rubenis (LAT)	+ 0.197

== Women's singles ==
Medal	Athlete	Time
Gold	Silke Kraushaar (GER)	1:39.611
Silver	Barbara Niedernhuber (GER)	+ 0.042
Bronze	Sylke Otto (GER)	+ 0.249

== Men's doubles ==
Medal	Athlete	Time
Gold	Germany (Patric Leitner, Alexander Resch)	1:38.930
Silver	Germany (André Florschütz, Torsten Wustlich)	+ 0.344
Bronze	United States (Mark Grimmette, Brian Martin)	+ 0.350

== Mixed team ==
Medal	Athlete	Time
Gold	Germany (David Möller, Barbara Niedernhuber, Patric Leitner, Alexander Resch)	2:28.711
Silver	United States (Tony Benshoof, Ashley Hayden, Mark Grimmette, Brian Martin)	+ 0.458
Bronze	Italy (Armin Zöggeler, Anastasia Oberstolz-Antonova, Christian Oberstolz, Patrick Gruber)	+ 0.704

== Medal table ==
Rank	Nation	Gold	Silver	Bronze	Total
1	Germany (GER)	4	3	1	8
2	United States (USA)	0	1	1	2
3	Italy (ITA)	0	0	1	1
3	Latvia (LAT)	0	0	1	1
Totals (4 entries)		4	4	4	12
