= Horst Hörnlein =

East German luger (born 1945)

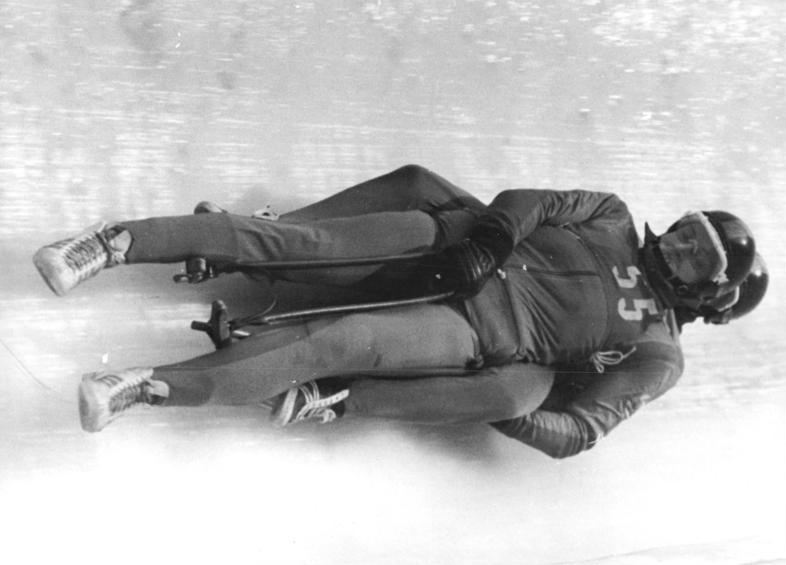
- Hörnlein (top) in 1971
Medal record
Men's Luge
Representing East Germany
Olympic Games
| Gold medal – first place | 1972 Sapporo | Men's doubles |
World Championships
| Gold medal – first place | 1973 Oberhof | Men's doubles |
| Silver medal – second place | 1969 Königssee | Men's doubles |
| Bronze medal – third place | 1965 Davos | Men's doubles |
| Bronze medal – third place | 1970 Königssee | Men's doubles |
| Bronze medal – third place | 1971 Olang | Men's doubles |
European Championships
| Gold medal – first place | 1970 Hammarstrand | Men's doubles |
| Gold medal – first place | 1971 Imst | Men's singles |
| Gold medal – first place | 1972 Königssee | Men's doubles |
| Bronze medal – third place | 1970 Hammarstrand | Men's singles |

Horst Hörnlein (also known as Horst Hömlein, born 31 May 1945 in Möhrenbach) is a former East German luger and bobsleigh coach who competed in the late 1960s and early 1970s. He and Reinhard Bredow won the gold medal in the men's doubles event (shared with the Italians Paul Hildgartner and Walter Plaikner) at the 1972 Winter Olympics in Sapporo.

Hörnlein also won five medals in the men's doubles event at the FIL World Luge Championships with one gold (1973), one silver (1969), and three bronzes (1965, 1970, 1971). He won four medals at the FIL European Luge Championships with three golds (Men's singles: 1971, Men's doubles: 1970, 1972) and one bronze (Men's singles: 1970).

After his retirement from competition, he became a bobsleigh coach, training the East German team from 1973 to 1990, and later coaching the British and Irish teams. He also served as head of the International Bobsleigh and Skeleton Federation's bobsleigh development programme, working with bobsledders from developing countries.
