= Anna-Maria Müller =

East German luger (1949–2009)

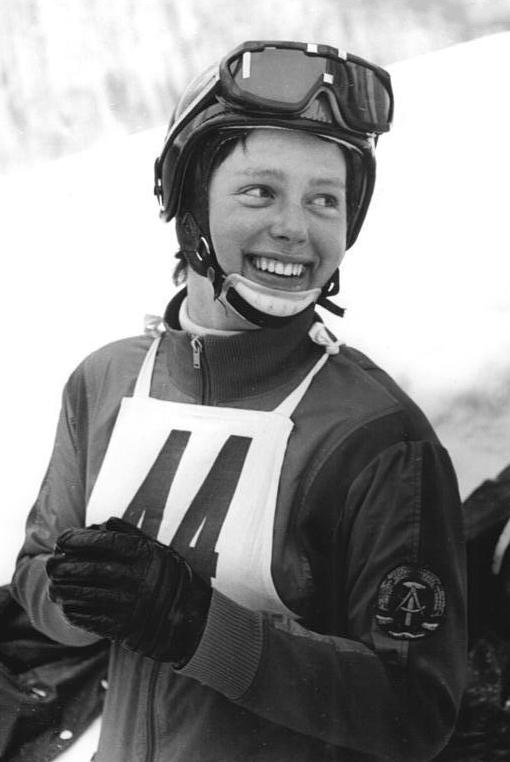
- Anna-Maria Müller in 1971

Personal information
- Born: 23 February 1949 Friedrichroda, Thuringia, Soviet Occupation Zone
- Died: 23 August 2009 (aged 60) Berlin, Germany
- Height: 1.68 m (5 ft 6 in)
- Weight: 70 kg (154 lb)

Sport
- Sport: Luge
- Club: SC Traktor Oberwiesenthal
Medal record
Representing East Germany
Olympic Games
Disqualified	1968 Grenoble	Singles
Gold medal – first place	1972 Sapporo	Singles
World Championships
Silver medal – second place	1969 Königssee	Singles
European Championships
Gold medal – first place	1970 Hammarstrand	Singles
Bronze medal – third place	1972 Königssee	Singles

Anna-Maria Müller (later Murach, 23 February 1949 – 23 August 2009) was an East German luger who competed in the late 1960s and early 1970s. She won the gold medal in the women's singles event at the 1972 Winter Olympics in Sapporo. At the previous Winter Olympics in Grenoble, she initially finished second after the competition was halted to three runs due to bad weather, but was disqualified with her East German teammates Ortrun Enderlein and Angela Knösel (who was fourth) when it was discovered that they had illegally heated their runners (which are used to guide the luge on the ice as it maneuvers down the track). Enderlein, who was leading at the time, and Müller were stripped of their respective medals as a result.

Upon her Olympic victory in Sapporo, Müller explained that she enjoyed luge because it "...provided a harmonius counterbalance to my work as a pharmacist."

Müller also won a silver medal at the 1969 FIL World Luge Championships in Königssee, West Germany, as well as two medals at the FIL European Luge Championships: a gold in 1970 and a bronze in 1972.
