= Angelika Tagwerker =

Austrian luger

Medal record

Luge

World Championships
Silver medal – second place	1991 Winterberg	Mixed team

Angelika Tagwerker (fl. 1990s) is an Austrian luger who competed in the early 1990s. She won the silver medal in the mixed team event at the 1991 FIL World Luge Championships in Winterberg, Germany.
