= FIL World Luge Championships 1965 =

World championship

The FIL World Luge Championships 1965 took place in Davos, Switzerland. This is the second time the city has hosted the event, having done so in 1957.

== Men's singles ==
Medal	Athlete	Time
Gold	Hans Plenk (GER)	
Silver	Mieczysław Pawełkiewicz (POL)	
Bronze	Erich Graber (ITA)	

== Women's singles ==
Medal	Athlete	Time
Gold	Ortrun Enderlein (GDR)	
Silver	Petra Tierlich (GDR)	
Bronze	Ilse Geisler (GDR)	

== Doubles ==
Medal	Athlete	Time
Gold	East Germany (Wolfgang Scheidel, Michael Köhler)	
Silver	East Germany (Klaus Bonsack, Thomas Köhler)	
Bronze	East Germany (Horst Hömlein, Rolf Fuchs)	

The East German doubles sweep at these championships would lead the International Luge Federation (FIL) to limit a country's doubles team to a maximum of two teams.

== Medal table ==
Rank	Nation	Gold	Silver	Bronze	Total
1	East Germany (GDR)	2	2	2	6
2	West Germany (FRG)	1	0	0	1
3	Poland (POL)	0	1	0	1
4	Italy (ITA)	0	0	1	1
Totals (4 entries)		3	3	3	9
