= Luge at the 1972 Winter Olympics =

Luge at the XI Olympic Winter Games
- Venue: Sapporo Teine
- Dates: 4–7 February 1972
- Competitors: 83 from 13 nations

Luge at the 1972 Winter Olympics consisted of three events at Sapporo Teine. The competition took place between 4 and 7 February 1972.

== Medal summary ==
=== Medal table ===
Rank	Nation	Gold	Silver	Bronze	Total
1	East Germany	3	2	3	8
2	Italy	1	0	0	1
Totals (2 entries)		4	2	3	9

East Germany led the medal table with eight medals, including three golds. The only non East-German medal came in the doubles, where Italy tied the Germans, with both teams receiving gold medals.

=== Events ===
Event	Gold		Silver		Bronze	
Men's singles	Wolfgang Scheidel; East Germany	3:27.58	Harald Ehrig; East Germany	3:28.39	Wolfram Fiedler; East Germany	3:28.73
Women's singles	Anna-Maria Müller; East Germany	2:59.18	Ute Rührold; East Germany	2:59.49	Margit Schumann; East Germany	2:59.54
Doubles	East Germany; Horst Hörnlein; Reinhard Bredow; Italy; Paul Hildgartner; Walter Plaikner	1:28.35 (Note: The two teams finished tied, and it was decided that gold medals would be awarded to both.)			East Germany; Klaus Bonsack; Wolfram Fiedler	1:29.16

== Participating NOCs ==
Thirteen nations participated in Luge at the Sapporo Games. Japan and the Soviet Union made their Olympic luge debut.

- Austria (8)
- Canada (4)
- France (1)
- West Germany (10)
- Great Britain (6)
- East Germany (9)
- Italy (9)
- Japan (7)
- Liechtenstein (1)
- Norway (3)
- Poland (8)
- Soviet Union (7)
- United States (10)
