= Sigisfredo Mair =

Italian luger (1939–1977)

Medal record

Luge

Representing Italy

Olympic Games
Bronze medal – third place	1964 Innsbruck	Men's doubles

World Championships
Bronze medal – third place	1967 Hammarstrand	Men's doubles

Josef Siegfried Mair (18 April 1939 – 15 May 1977), known as Sigisfredo Mair, was an Italian luger who competed from the early 1960s to the early 1970s. He was born in the German-speaking town of Toblach in South Tyrol, Italy. He won the bronze medal in the men's doubles event at the 1964 Winter Olympics in Innsbruck.

Mair also won a bronze medal in the men's doubles event at the 1967 FIL World Luge Championships in Hammarstrand, Sweden.

He was killed in a car accident in 1977.
