= FIL World Luge Championships 1974 =

The FIL World Luge Championships 1974 took place in Königssee, West Germany for a record third time. Königssee had hosted the event previously in 1969 and 1970.

== Men's singles ==
Medal	Athlete	Time
Gold	Josef Fendt (GER)	
Silver	Hans Rinn (GDR)	
Bronze	Horst Müller (GDR)	

== Women's singles ==
Medal	Athlete	Time
Gold	Margit Schumann (GDR)	
Silver	Elisabeth Demleitner (GER)	
Bronze	Ute Rührold (GDR)	

== Men's doubles ==
Medal	Athlete	Time
Gold	East Germany (Bernd Hahn, Ulrich Hahn)	
Silver	East Germany (Henning Schulze, Hans-Jörg Neumann)	
Bronze	Austria (Rudolf Schmid, Franz Schachner)	

== Medal table ==
Rank	Nation	Gold	Silver	Bronze	Total
1	East Germany (GDR)	2	2	2	6
2	West Germany (FRG)	1	1	0	2
3	Austria (AUT)	0	0	1	1
Totals (3 entries)		3	3	3	9
