= André Florschütz =

German luger (born 1976)

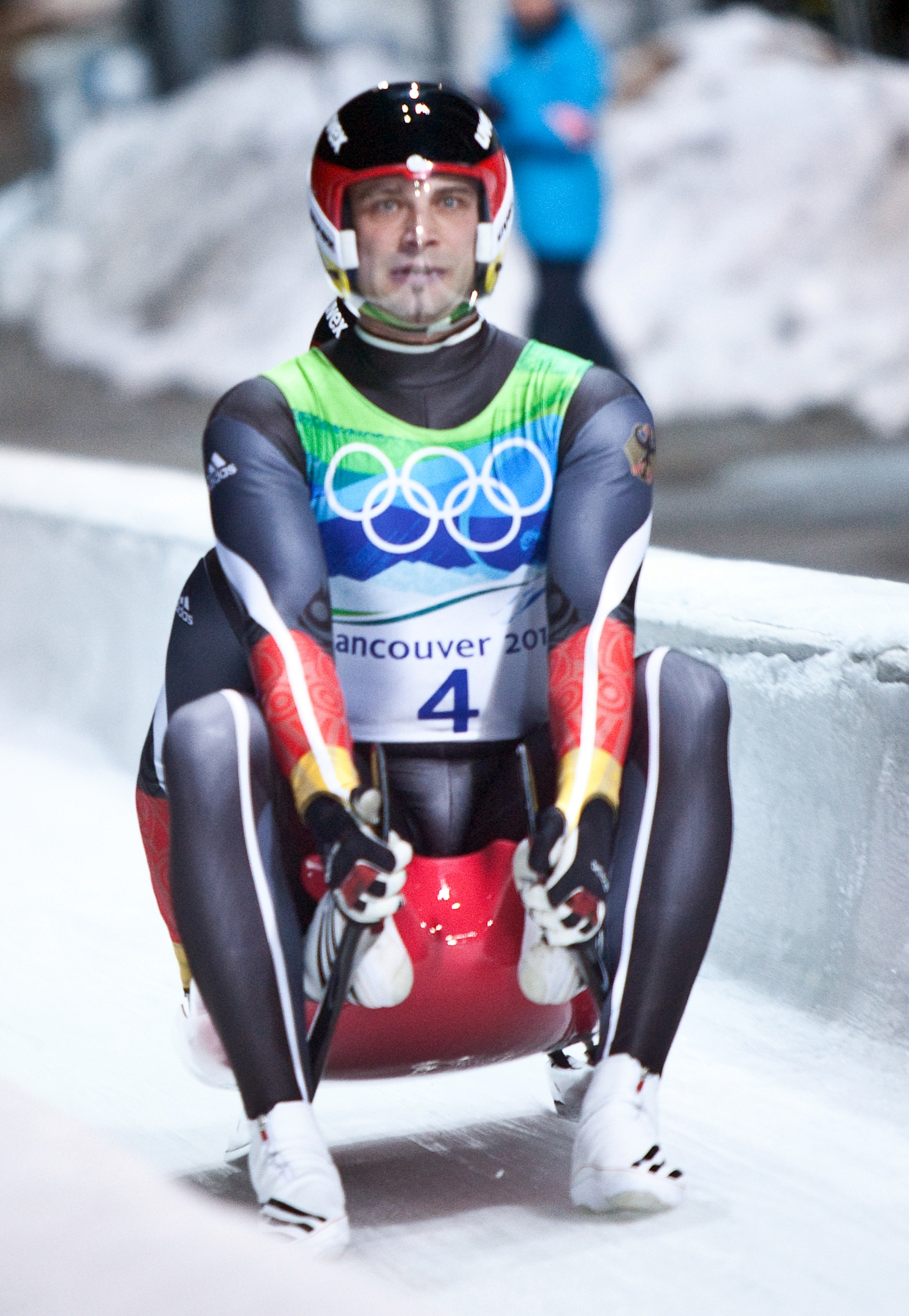
- Florschütz/Wustlich at the 2010 Winter Olympics

Personal information
- Nationality: German
- Born: 6 August 1976 (age 49) Sonneberg, Bezirk Suhl, East Germany
- Height: 1.83 m (6 ft 0 in)
- Weight: 85 kg (187 lb; 13.4 st)

Sport
- Country: Germany
- Sport: Luge

Achievements and titles
- Olympic finals: 2nd place, silver medalist(s)
Medal record
Olympic Games
| Silver medal – second place | 2006 Turin | Men's doubles |
World Championships
| Gold medal – first place | 2001 Calgary | Men's doubles |
| Gold medal – first place | 2005 Park City | Men's doubles |
| Gold medal – first place | 2005 Park City | Mixed team |
| Gold medal – first place | 2008 Oberhof | Men's doubles |
| Gold medal – first place | 2008 Oberhof | Mixed team |
| Gold medal – first place | 2009 Lake Placid | Mixed team |
| Silver medal – second place | 1999 Königssee | Mixed team |
| Silver medal – second place | 2004 Nagano | Men's doubles |
| Silver medal – second place | 2009 Lake Placid | Men's doubles |
World Cup Championships
| Gold medal – first place | 2009–10 | Men's doubles |
| Silver medal – second place | 2000–01 | Men's doubles |
| Silver medal – second place | 2003–04 | Men's doubles |
| Silver medal – second place | 2004–05 | Men's doubles |
| Bronze medal – third place | 2005–06 | Men's doubles |

André Florschütz (born 6 August 1976 in Sonneberg) is a German luger who competed from 1993 to 2010. Together with Torsten Wustlich, he won the silver medal in the men's doubles event at the 2006 Winter Olympics in Turin.

Florschütz also won nine medals at the FIL World Luge Championships with six golds (Men's doubles: 2001, 2005, 2008; Mixed team: 2005, 2008, 2009) and three silvers (Men's doubles: 2004, 2009; Mixed team: 1999).

His best overall finish at the FIL European Luge Championships was fifth in the men's doubles event twice (2004, 2008).

Florschütz's best overall finish in the men's doubles Luge World Cup was second three times (2000-1, 2003-4, 2004-5). His younger brother Thomas competes for Germany in bobsleigh.
