= Reinhard Bredow =

East German luger (born 1947)

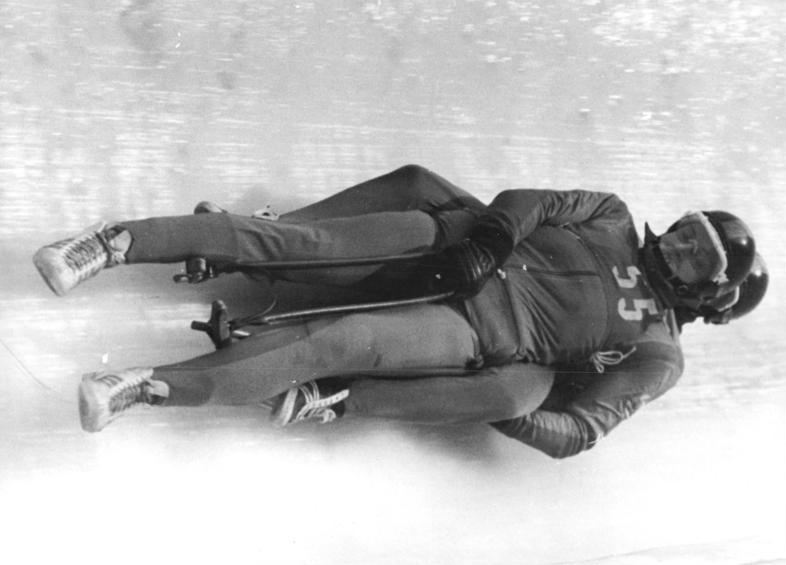
- Bredow (bottom, covered by Hörnlein on top) in 1971

Personal information
- Born: 6 April 1947 (age 79) Ilsenburg, Soviet occupation zone of Germany
Medal record
Men's luge
Representing East Germany
Olympic Games
Gold medal – first place	1972 Sapporo	Men's doubles
World Championships
Gold medal – first place	1973 Oberhof	Men's doubles
Silver medal – second place	1969 Königssee	Men's doubles
Bronze medal – third place	1970 Königssee	Men's doubles
Bronze medal – third place	1971 Olang	Men's doubles
European Championships
Gold medal – first place	1970 Hammarstrand	Men's doubles
Gold medal – first place	1972 Königssee	Men's doubles
- Updated on 30 October 2018

Reinhard Bredow (also known as Reinhard Bredlow, born 6 April 1947 in Ilsenburg) is an East German former luger who competed in the late 1960s and early 1970s. He and Horst Hörnlein won the gold medal in the men's doubles event (shared with the Italian pairing of Walter Plaikner and Paul Hildgartner) at the 1972 Winter Olympics in Sapporo.

Bredow also won four medals in the men's doubles event at the FIL World Luge Championships with one gold (1973), one silver (1969), and two bronzes (1970, 1971). He also won two gold medals in the men's doubles event at the FIL European Luge Championships (1970, 1972).
