= Rolf Fuchs =

East German luger

Medal record

Luge

World Championships
Bronze medal – third place	1965 Davos	Men's doubles

Rolf Fuchs was an East German luger who competed in the mid-1960s. He won the bronze medal in the men's doubles event at the 1965 FIL World Luge Championships in Davos, Switzerland.
