= FIL World Luge Championships 1977 =

The FIL World Luge Championships 1977 took place in Igls, Austria.

== Men's singles ==
Medal	Athlete	Time
Gold	Hans Rinn (GDR)	
Silver	Horst Müller (GDR)	
Bronze	Anton Winkler (GER)	

== Women's singles ==
Medal	Athlete	Time
Gold	Margit Schumann (GDR)	
Silver	Vera Zozula (URS)	
Bronze	Margit Graf (AUT)	

== Men's doubles ==
Medal	Athlete	Time
Gold	East Germany (Hans Rinn, Norbert Hahn)	
Silver	Italy (Karl Brunner, Peter Gschnitzer)	
Bronze	West Germany (Hans Brandner, Balthasar Schwarm)	

== Medal table ==
Rank	Nation	Gold	Silver	Bronze	Total
1	East Germany (GDR)	3	1	0	4
2	Italy (ITA)	0	1	0	1
2	Soviet Union (URS)	0	1	0	1
4	West Germany (FRG)	0	0	2	2
5	Austria (AUT)	0	0	1	1
Totals (5 entries)		3	3	3	9
