= FIL World Luge Championships 2005 =

The FIL World Luge Championships 2005 took place in Park City, Utah, United States.

== Men's singles ==
Medal	Athlete	Time
Gold	Armin Zöggeler (ITA)	1:30.617 min
Silver	Georg Hackl (GER)	1:30.770 min
Bronze	David Möller (GER)	1:30.784 min

== Women's singles ==
Medal	Athlete	Time
Gold	Sylke Otto (GER)	1:28.056 min
Silver	Barbara Niedernhuber (GER)	1:28.284 min
Bronze	Anke Wischnewski (GER)	1:28.366 min

== Men's doubles ==
Medal	Athlete	Time
Gold	Germany (André Florschütz, Torsten Wustlich)	1:28.091 min
Silver	Germany (Patric Leitner, Alexander Resch)	1:28.103 min
Bronze	United States (Mark Grimmette, Brian Martin)	1:28.215 min

== Mixed team ==
Medal	Athlete	Time
Gold	Germany (Georg Hackl, Sylke Otto, André Florschütz, Torsten Wustlich)	
Silver	United States (Tony Benshoof, Ashley Hayden, Mark Grimmette, Brian Martin)	
Bronze	Italy (Armin Zöggeler, Anastasia Oberstolz-Antonova, Christian Oberstolz, Patrick Gruber)	

== Medal table ==
Rank	Nation	Gold	Silver	Bronze	Total
1	Germany (GER)	3	3	2	8
2	Italy (ITA)	1	0	1	2
3	United States (USA)	0	1	1	2
Totals (3 entries)		4	4	4	12
