= FIL World Luge Championships 1969 =

The FIL World Luge Championships 1969 took place in Königssee, West Germany. It marked the first time the event took place on a permanent, artificially refrigerated track in bobsleigh, luge, and/ or skeleton.

== Men's singles ==
Medal	Athlete	Time
Gold	Josef Feistmantl (AUT)	
Silver	Manfred Schmid (AUT)	
Bronze	Wolfgang Scheidel (GDR)	

== Women's singles ==
Medal	Athlete	Time
Gold	Petra Tierlich (GDR)	
Silver	Anna-Maria Müller (GDR)	
Bronze	Christina Schmuck (GER)	

== Men's doubles ==
Medal	Athlete	Time
Gold	Austria (Manfred Schmid, Ewald Walch)	
Silver	East Germany (Horst Hörnlein, Reinhard Bredow)	
Bronze	East Germany (Klaus Bonsack, Michael Köhler)	

== Medal table ==
Rank	Nation	Gold	Silver	Bronze	Total
1	Austria (AUT)	2	1	0	3
2	East Germany (GDR)	1	2	2	5
3	West Germany (FRG)	0	0	1	1
Totals (3 entries)		3	3	3	9
