= FIL World Luge Championships 1970 =

The FIL World Luge Championships 1970 took place in Königssee, West Germany. It is the only time that the championships have been held in the same location in consecutive years.

== Men's singles ==
Medal	Athlete	Time
Gold	Josef Fendt (GER)	
Silver	Josef Feistmantl (AUT)	
Bronze	Wolfgang Scheidel (GDR)	

== Women's singles ==
Medal	Athlete	Time
Gold	Barbara Piecha (POL)	
Silver	Christa Schmuck (GER)	
Bronze	Elisabeth Demleitner (GER)	

== Men's doubles ==
Medal	Athlete	Time
Gold	Austria (Manfred Schmid, Ewald Walch)	
Silver	East Germany (Klaus Bonsack, Michael Köhler)	
Bronze	East Germany (Horst Hömlein, Reinhard Bredlow)	

== Medal table ==
Rank	Nation	Gold	Silver	Bronze	Total
1	West Germany (FRG)	1	1	1	3
2	Austria (AUT)	1	1	0	2
3	Poland (POL)	1	0	0	1
4	East Germany (GDR)	0	1	2	3
Totals (4 entries)		3	3	3	9
