= Luge at the 2002 Winter Olympics – Doubles =

Doubles at the XIX Olympic Winter Games
- Pictogram for luge
- Venue: Utah Olympic Park
- Dates: 15 February 2002
- Competitors: 38 from 12 nations

Medalists
| 1st place, gold medalist(s) | | Patric Leitner & Alexander Resch | Germany |
| 2nd place, silver medalist(s) | | Mark Grimmette & Brian Martin | United States |
| 3rd place, bronze medalist(s) | | Chris Thorpe & Clay Ives | United States |

The doubles luge at the 2002 Winter Olympics took place on 15 February at Utah Olympic Park.

== Results ==
Two runs were held on 15 February and the final placements were determined by the combined total of both runs.

| Place | Athletes | Country | Run 1 | Run 2 | Total | Behind |
|---|---|---|---|---|---|---|
| Gold medal | Patric Leitner; Alexander Resch | Germany | 42.953 | 43.129 | 1:26.082 | — |
| Silver medal | Mark Grimmette; Brian Martin | United States | 43.111 | 43.105 | 1:26.216 | +0.134 |
| Bronze medal | Chris Thorpe; Clay Ives | United States | 43.013 | 43.207 | 1:26.220 | +0.138 |
| 4 | Steffen Skel; Steffen Wöller | Germany | 43.121 | 43.254 | 1:26.375 | +0.293 |
| 5 | Chris Moffat; Eric Pothier | Canada | 43.285 | 43.216 | 1:26.501 | +0.419 |
| 6 | Tobias Schiegl; Markus Schiegl | Austria | 43.208 | 43.310 | 1:26.518 | +0.436 |
| 7 | Gerhard Plankensteiner; Oswald Haselrieder | Italy | 43.278 | 43.338 | 1:26.616 | +0.534 |
| 8 | Andreas Linger; Wolfgang Linger | Austria | 43.330 | 43.354 | 1:26.684 | +0.602 |
| 9 | Ľubomír Mick; Walter Marx | Slovakia | 43.248 | 43.458 | 1:26.706 | +0.624 |
| 10 | Ivars Deinis; Sandris Bērziņš | Latvia | 43.413 | 43.493 | 1:26.906 | +0.824 |
| 11 | Oleh Avdeev; Danylo Panchenko | Ukraine | 43.727 | 43.600 | 1:27.327 | +1.245 |
| 12 | Grant Albrecht; Mike Moffat | Canada | 43.645 | 43.721 | 1:27.366 | +1.284 |
| 13 | Danil Tchaban; Yevgeny Zykov | Russia | 43.691 | 43.895 | 1:27.586 | +1.504 |
| 14 | Mikhail Kuzmich; Jury Veselov | Russia | 43.815 | 43.844 | 1:27.659 | +1.577 |
| 15 | Eugen Radu; Marian Tican | Romania | 43.901 | 43.945 | 1:27.846 | +1.764 |
| 16 | Cristian Stanciu; Robert Taleanu | Romania | 43.977 | 43.979 | 1:27.956 | +1.874 |
| 17 | Christian Oberstolz; Patrick Gruber | Italy | 45.882 | 43.421 | 1:29.303 | +3.221 |
| | Anders Söderberg; Bengt Walden | Sweden | 45.589 | DNF | | |
| | Takahisa Oguchi; Kei Takahashi | Japan | DNF | | | |
