= Luge at the 2010 Winter Olympics – Doubles =

Doubles at the XXI Olympic Winter Games
- Pictogram for luge
- Venue: Whistler Sliding Centre
- Dates: 17 February 2010
- Competitors: 20 teams from 11 nations
- Winning time: 1:22.705

Medalists
1st place, gold medalist(s)		Andreas Linger & Wolfgang Linger	Austria
2nd place, silver medalist(s)		Andris Šics & Juris Šics	Latvia
3rd place, bronze medalist(s)		Patric Leitner & Alexander Resch	Germany

The doubles luge event at the 2010 Winter Olympics was held on 17 February at the Whistler Sliding Centre in Whistler, British Columbia. Twenty teams participated. Austrian brothers Andreas and Wolfgang Linger, the defending Olympic and European champions, won the gold medal. The silver medal was also won by a pair of brothers, Andris and Juris Šics of Latvia. Germans Patric Leitner and Alexander Resch clinched the bronze medal after edging out Italians Christian Oberstolz and Patrick Gruber, who were in third place after the first run.

Changes had been made to the track after a Georgian luger Nodar Kumaritashvili died during a training run before the Games began. The turn where Kumaritashvili died was adjusted and padding was added to metal support pillar nearby. In addition, the start of the doubles race was moved to the junior start, meaning not only that the course was shorter but that the athletes would enter a turn and then a sharp corner almost immediately after the start. This required a change in strategy for many competitors, and a limited number of training runs in which to develop it. However, media reports mentioned the changes positively after a doubles team, Austria's Tobias and Markus Schiegl, crashed in the same turn where Kumaritashvili was killed.

== Rules ==
In accordance with the International Olympic Committee and the International Luge Federation (FIL), 20 doubles teams (40 athletes total) were allowed to take part in the event. Athletes were to be ranked by the number of world cup points they earned in the 2008–09 season and through the first half (before 31 December) of the 2009–10 season. To be eligible, athletes must either have earned world cup points in five World Cups, Nations Cup or Junior World Cup, or have a top-16 (doubles) finish at the world cup during the qualification period. The top-20 doubles sleds were to be qualified for the Olympics, up to two sleds per nation, with unused quotas to be redistributed with priority given to unrepresented nations. The host nation (Canada) was to be guaranteed a sled in every event provided that they reached the minimum requirements.

International Luge Federation rules for doubles events require that teams participate in two competition runs. The times are then added together and the sled with the lowest time is the winner.

== Preview ==
As defending Olympic and European champions, Andreas and Wolfgang Linger were expected to be competitive in the doubles event. However, there were a number of other teams which were expected to be contenders for the gold medal. Italy's team of Gerhard Plankensteiner and Oswald Haselrieder entered the Vancouver Games as the defending Olympic bronze medalists and the defending world champions. The test event that took place at the venue was won by the German team of André Florschütz and Torsten Wustlich, the defending Olympic silver medalists. The last World Cup event prior to the 2010 games took place in Cesana, Italy on 30 January 2010 and was won by the German duo of Tobias Wendl and Tobias Arlt, who might also have but contenders but who did not qualify for the 2010 Games, losing out to teammates Florschütz and Wustlich and 2002 doubles champions Patric Leitner and Alexander Resch.

== Records ==
While the IOC does not consider luge times eligible for Olympic records, the International Luge Federation (FIL) does maintain records for both the start and a complete run at each track it competes.

The start and track records were set at the test event from the women's singles/ men's doubles start house for the 2010 Games on 20 February 2009.

Type	Date	Team	Time
Start	20 February 2009	Germany; Tobias Wendl; Tobias Arlt	7.054
Track	20 February 2009	Germany; Patric Leitner; Alexander Resch	48.608

== Death of Nodar Kumaritashvili ==
During training on February 12, 2010, Georgian luger, Nodar Kumaritashvili was going at over 143 kilometres per hour (89 mph) when he crashed in the last turn and hit a steel pole. He was administered CPR at the track, then taken away to hospital where he was later pronounced dead. Training was immediately stopped. As a result, the start of the men's single competition was moved to the women's/doubles' start to reduce speed and the wall at corner where Kumaritashvili crashed was raised.

Investigations were conducted the same day, concluding that the accident was not caused by deficiencies in the track. As a preventative measure, the walls at the exit of curve 16 will be raised and a change in the ice profile will be made. A joint statement was issued by the FIL, the International Olympic Committee, and the Vancouver Organizing Committee over Kurmaitasvili's death with training suspended for the rest of that day. According to the Coroners Service of British Columbia and the Royal Canadian Mounted Police, the cause was to Kumaritashvili coming out of turn 15 late and not compensating for turn 16. Because of this fatality, an extra 40 yd (37 m) of wall was added after the end of Turn 16 and the ice profile was changed. It also moved the men's singles luge event from its starthouse to the one for both the women's singles and men's doubles event. Kumaritashvili is the first Olympic athlete to die at the Winter Olympics in training since 1992 and the first luger to die in a practice event at the Winter Olympics since Kazimierz Kay-Skrzypeski of Great Britain was killed at the luge track used for the 1964 Winter Olympics in Innsbruck. It was also luge's first fatality (on an artificial track) since 10 December 1975, when an Italian luger was killed. Kumaritavili's teammate Levan Gureshidze withdrew prior to the first run of the event.

The women's singles and men's doubles starts were moved to the Junior start house of the track, located after turn 6. Germany's Natalie Geisenberger complained that it was not a women's start but more of a kinder ("child" in German) start. Her teammate Tatjana Hüfner who had the fastest speed on two runs of 82.3 mph (132.4 km/h) stated that the new start position "..does not help good starters like myself". American Erin Hamlin stated the track was still demanding even after the distance was lessened from 1,193 to 953 m (3,914 to 3,127 ft) and that you were still hitting 80 mph (130 km/h). Despite criticisms, media reports about the doubles competition portrayed the track changes positively after Austria's Tobias and Markus Schiegl crashed at the same turn where Kumaritashvili died.

On 23 March 2010, FIL President Fendt, VANOC President John Furlong, 2010 men's singles gold medalist Felix Loch of Germany visited Kumaritashvili's grave in his hometown of Bakuriani to pay respects as part of tradition in the Georgian Orthodox Church.

The FIL published their reports in regards to Kumaritashvili's death on 12 April 2010 following the FIL Commissions Meeting in St. Leonhard, in Graz, Austria, for both sport and technical commissions on 9–11 April 2010. This report was prepared by Romstad and Claire DelNegro, Vice-President Sport Artificial Track, who is from the United States.

== Qualifying athletes ==
The following athletes had qualified for the doubles event as of 4 February 2010.

- Cosmin Chetroiu & Ionut Taran (ROU)
- André Florschütz & Torsten Wustlich (GER)
- Mark Grimmette & Brian Martin (USA)
- Oskars Gudramovičs & Pēteris Kalniņš (LAT)
- Jan Harnis & Branislav Regec (SVK)
- Paul Ifrim & Andrei Anghel (ROU)
- Andriy Kis & Yuriy Hayduk (UKR)
- Mikhail Kuzmich & Stanislav Mikheev (RUS)
- Luboš Jíra & Matěj Kvíčala (CZE)
- Patric Leitner & Alexander Resch (GER)
- Andreas Linger & Wolfgang Linger (AUT)
- Chris Moffat & Mike Moffat (CAN)
- Christian Niccum & Dan Joye (USA)
- Christian Oberstolz & Patrick Gruber (ITA)
- Gerhard Plankensteiner & Oswald Haselrieder (ITA)
- Andris Šics & Juris Šics (LAT)
- Tobias Schiegl & Markus Schiegl (AUT)
- Taras Senkiv & Roman Zaharkiv (UKR)
- Tristan Walker & Justin Snith (CAN)
- Vladislav Yuzhakov & Vladimir Makhnutin (RUS)

== Competition ==
The two-run event took place on 17 February at 17:00 PST and 18:30 PST.

Linger and Linger had the fastest time in both runs and won their second straight Olympic gold medal in this event, joining the East German duo of Hans Rinn and Norbert Hahn who won the event in 1976 and 1980 as the only repeat gold medalists in the event in Olympic history. This was also Austria's first gold medal at these Olympics for the co-opening ceremony flagbearers. The Šics brothers earned Latvia's first medals at these Olympics. 2002 gold medalists Leitner and Resch earned bronze medals in their last competition. Defending World Cup champions Florschütz and Wustlich finished fifth while defending world champions Plankensteiner and Haselrieder finished a disappointing ninth.

During the first run, Schiegl and Schiegl survived a crash on Turn 16 where they came in too high. Tobias tried to correct the oversteer only to have the cousins collide on the opposite side of the ice wall, causing both cousins to go airborne momentarily. Neither cousin suffered any injury.

== Results ==
Rank	Bib	Athlete	Country	Run 1	Run 2	Total	Behind
1st place, gold medalist(s)	11	Andreas Linger; Wolfgang Linger	Austria	8.217; 41.332	8.191; 41.373	1:22.705	0.000
2nd place, silver medalist(s)	7	Andris Šics; Juris Šics	Latvia	8.256; 41.420	8.251; 41.549	1:22.969	+0.264
3rd place, bronze medalist(s)	6	Patric Leitner; Alexander Resch	Germany	8.315; 41.566	8.261; 41.474	1:23.040	+0.335
4	2	Christian Oberstolz; Patrick Gruber	Italy	8.244; 41.527	8.261; 41.585	1:23.112	+0.407
5	4	André Florschütz; Torsten Wustlich	Germany	8.276; 41.545	8.345; 41.645	1:23.190	+0.485
6	3	Christian Niccum; Dan Joye	United States	8.359; 41.602	8.408; 41.689	1:23.291	+0.586
7	1	Chris Moffat; Mike Moffat	Canada	8.363; 41.675	8.319; 41.723	1:23.398	+0.693
8	5	Tobias Schiegl; Markus Schiegl	Austria	8.275; 41.727	8.293; 41.801	1:23.528	+0.823
9	8	Oswald Haselrieder; Gerhard Plankensteiner	Italy	8.419; 41.789	8.374; 41.860	1:23.649	+0.944
10	10	Vladimir Makhnutin; Vladislav Yuzhakov	Russia	8.395; 41.798	8.422; 41.948	1:23.746	+1.041
11	15	Jan Harnis; Branislav Regec	Slovakia	8.422; 42.018	8.411; 41.924	1:23.942	+1.237
12	19	Oskars Gudramovičs; Pēteris Kalniņš	Latvia	8.385; 41.982	8.496; 42.013	1:23.995	+1.290
13	9	Mark Grimmette; Brian Martin	United States	8.448; 41.821	8.571; 42.184	1:24.005	+1.300
14	12	Mikhail Kuzmich; Stanislav Mikheev	Russia	8.488; 42.174	8.453; 41.981	1:24.155	+1.450
15	18	Justin Snith; Tristan Walker	Canada	8.522; 42.100	8.531; 42.120	1:24.220	+1.515
16	13	Andriy Kis; Yuriy Hayduk	Ukraine	8.415; 42.219	8.437; 42.136	1:24.355	+1.650
17	14	Cosmin Chetroiu; Ionut Taran	Romania	8.506; 42.360	8.471; 42.271	1:24.631	+1.926
18	17	Luboš Jíra; Matěj Kvíčala	Czech Republic	8.470; 42.204	8.592; 42.459	1:24.663	+1.958
19	20	Taras Senkiv; Roman Zaharkiv	Ukraine	8.721; 42.767	8.639; 42.595	1:25.362	+2.657
20	16	Paul Ifrim; Andrei Anghel	Romania	8.575; 43.007	8.493; 42.466	1:25.473	+2.768
