= Luge at the 2006 Winter Olympics – Doubles =

Doubles at the XX Olympic Winter Games
- Pictogram for luge
- Venue: Cesana Pariol
- Dates: February 15, 2006
- Competitors: 42 from 13 nations

Medalists
1st place, gold medalist(s)		Andreas Linger & Wolfgang Linger	Austria
2nd place, silver medalist(s)		André Florschütz & Torsten Wustlich	Germany
3rd place, bronze medalist(s)		Gerhard Plankensteiner & Oswald Haselrieder	Italy

The doubles luge at the 2006 Winter Olympics took place on February 15 at Cesana Pariol.

== Results ==
Two runs were held on February 15 and the final placements were determined by the combined total of both runs.

Place	Athletes	Country	Run 1	Run 2	Total	Behind
Gold medal	Andreas Linger; Wolfgang Linger	Austria	47.028	47.469	1:34.497	—
Silver medal	André Florschütz; Torsten Wustlich	Germany	47.141	47.666	1:34.807	0.310
Bronze medal	Gerhard Plankensteiner; Oswald Haselrieder	Italy	47.236	47.694	1:34.930	0.433
4	Tobias Schiegl; Markus Schiegl	Austria	47.108	47.843	1:34.951	0.454
5	Christian Oberstolz; Patrick Gruber	Italy	47.620	47.336	1:34.956	0.459
6	Patric Leitner; Alexander Resch	Germany	47.198	47.762	1:34.960	0.463
7	Andris Šics; Juris Šics	Latvia	47.353	47.761	1:35.114	0.617
8	Preston Griffall; Dan Joye	United States	47.722	47.688	1:35.410	0.913
9	Chris Moffat; Mike Moffat	Canada	47.715	47.826	1:35.541	1.044
10	Grant Albrecht; Eric Pothier	Canada	47.478	48.083	1:35.561	1.064
11	Mihail Kuzmitch; Jury Veselov	Russia	47.556	48.094	1:35.650	1.153
12	Goro Hayashibe; Masaki Toshiro	Japan	48.067	47.793	1:35.860	1.363
13	Lubomir Mick; Walter Marx	Slovakia	48.412	47.857	1:36.269	1.772
14	Andriy Kis; Yuriy Hayduk	Ukraine	48.850	48.327	1:37.177	2.680
15	Eugen Radu; Marian Lăzărescu	Romania	49.526	48.357	1:37.883	3.386
16	Antonin Broz; Lukas Broz	Czech Republic	49.415	48.697	1:38.112	3.615
17	Marcin Piekarski; Krzysztof Lipinski	Poland	49.829	48.616	1:38.445	3.948
18	Cosmin Chetroiu; Ionuţ Ţăran	Romania	48.625	50.968	1:39.593	5.096
-	Oleg Zherebetskyy; Roman Yazvinskyy	Ukraine	50.897	DNS		
-	Mark Grimmette; Brian Martin	United States	DNF			
-	Vladimir Boitsov; Dmitriy Khamkin	Russia	DNF			
