= 2007–08 Luge World Cup =

International luge competition

The 2007–08 Luge World Cup was a multi race series over a season for luge. The season started on 16 November 2007 and ended on 17 February 2008. The World Cup is organised by the FIL.

== Calendar ==
Date	Place	Disc.	Winner	Second	Third
November 16–17, 2007	(United States) Lake Placid	Men's	(Italy) Armin Zöggeler	(Germany) David Möller	(Germany) Jan Eichhorn
November 16–17, 2007	(United States) Lake Placid	Doubles	Austria; Andreas Linger; Wolfgang Linger	Germany; Patric Leitner; Alexander Resch	Italy; Gerhard Plankensteiner; Oswald Haselrieder
November 16–17, 2007	(United States) Lake Placid	Women's	(Germany) Silke Kraushaar-Pielach	(Germany) Natalie Geisenberger	(Germany) Anke Wischnewski
November 16–17, 2007	(United States) Lake Placid	Team Relay	United States; Erin Hamlin; Tony Benshoof; Christian Niccum; Dan Joye	Austria; Nina Reithmayer; Daniel Pfister; Andreas Linger; Wolfgang Linger	Germany; Silke Kraushaar-Pielach; Felix Loch; Patric Leitner; Alexander Resch
November 24–25, 2007	(Canada) Calgary	Men's	(Germany) David Möller	(Germany) Jan Eichhorn	(Italy) Armin Zöggeler
November 24–25, 2007	(Canada) Calgary	Doubles	Germany; Patric Leitner; Alexander Resch	Italy; Christian Oberstolz; Patrick Gruber	Germany; André Florschütz; Torsten Wustlich
November 24–25, 2007	(Canada) Calgary	Women's	(Germany) Tatjana Hüfner	(Germany) Silke Kraushaar-Pielach	(Germany) Natalie Geisenberger
December 8–9, 2007	(Germany) Winterberg	Men's	(Germany) David Möller	(Italy) Armin Zöggeler	(Switzerland) Stefan Höhener
December 8–9, 2007	(Germany) Winterberg	Doubles	Italy; Christian Oberstolz; Patrick Gruber	Austria; Markus Schiegl; Tobias Schiegl	Germany; Patric Leitner; Alexander Resch
December 8–9, 2007	(Germany) Winterberg	Women's	(Germany) Tatjana Hüfner	(Germany) Anke Wischnewski	(Germany) Silke Kraushaar-Pielach
December 8–9, 2007	(Germany) Winterberg	Team Relay	Austria; Nina Reithmayer; Daniel Pfister; Markus Schiegl; Tobias Schiegl	Germany; Silke Kraushaar-Pielach; David Möller; Tobias Wendl; Tobias Arlt	Latvia; Maija Tīruma; Guntis Rēķis; Andris Šics; Juris Šics
December 15–16, 2007	(Austria) Innsbruck	Men's	(Italy) Armin Zöggeler	(Germany) David Möller	(Austria) Daniel Pfister
December 15–16, 2007	(Austria) Innsbruck	Doubles	Germany; Patric Leitner; Alexander Resch	Italy; Christian Oberstolz; Patrick Gruber	Germany; André Florschütz; Torsten Wustlich
December 15–16, 2007	(Austria) Innsbruck	Women's	(Germany) Tatjana Hüfner	(Germany) Silke Kraushaar-Pielach	(Germany) Natalie Geisenberger
January 5–6, 2008	(Germany) Königssee	Men's	(Russia) Albert Demtschenko	(Italy) Armin Zöggeler	(Germany) David Möller
January 5–6, 2008	(Germany) Königssee	Doubles	Germany; Patric Leitner; Alexander Resch	Germany; Tobias Wendl; Tobias Arlt	Italy; Christian Oberstolz; Patrick Gruber
January 5–6, 2008	(Germany) Königssee	Women's	(Germany) Tatjana Hüfner	(Germany) Natalie Geisenberger	(Germany) Silke Kraushaar-Pielach
January 5–6, 2008	(Germany) Königssee	Team Relay	Germany; Silke Kraushaar-Pielach; David Möller; Patric Leitner; Alexander Resch	Canada; Regan Lauscher; Jeff Christie; Chris Moffat; Mike Moffat	United States; Julia Clukey; Tony Benshoof; Christian Niccum; Dan Joye
January 12–13, 2008	(Italy) Cesana Pariol	FIL European Luge Championships 2008			
January 25–27, 2008	(Germany) Oberhof	FIL World Luge Championships 2008			
February 2–3, 2008	(Germany) Altenberg	Men's	(Italy) Armin Zöggeler	(Germany) David Möller	(Russia) Albert Demtschenko
February 2–3, 2008	(Germany) Altenberg	Doubles	Germany; Patric Leitner; Alexander Resch	Austria; Andreas Linger; Wolfgang Linger	Germany; Tobias Wendl; Tobias Arlt
February 2–3, 2008	(Germany) Altenberg	Women's	(Germany) Tatjana Hüfner	(Germany) Silke Kraushaar-Pielach	(Germany) Natalie Geisenberger
February 14–15, 2008	(Latvia) Sigulda	Men's	(Italy) Armin Zöggeler	(Russia) Albert Demtschenko	(Austria) Daniel Pfister
February 14–15, 2008	(Latvia) Sigulda	Doubles	Germany; André Florschütz; Torsten Wustlich	Italy; Christian Oberstolz; Patrick Gruber	Austria; Andreas Linger; Wolfgang Linger
February 14–15, 2008	(Latvia) Sigulda	Women's	(Germany) Tatjana Hüfner	(Germany) Silke Kraushaar-Pielach	(Latvia) Maija Tīruma
February 16-February 17, 2008	(Latvia) Sigulda	Men's	(Russia) Albert Demtschenko	(Italy) Armin Zöggeler	(Germany) David Möller
February 16-February 17, 2008	(Latvia) Sigulda	Doubles	Italy; Christian Oberstolz; Patrick Gruber	Austria; Andreas Linger; Wolfgang Linger	Germany; André Florschütz; Torsten Wustlich
February 16-February 17, 2008	(Latvia) Sigulda	Women's	(Germany) Tatjana Hüfner	(Latvia) Anna Orlova	(Germany) Silke Kraushaar-Pielach
February 16-February 17, 2008	(Latvia) Sigulda	Team Relay	Germany; Tatjana Hüfner; David Möller; André Florschütz; Torsten Wustlich	Austria; Nina Reithmayer; Daniel Pfister; Andreas Linger; Wolfgang Linger	Latvia; Anna Orlova; Guntis Rēķis; Andris Šics; Juris Šics

== Standings ==
=== Men's singles ===
Pos.	Luger	LAK	CAL	WIN	IGL	KÖN	ALT	SIG	SIG	Points
1.	(Italy) Armin Zöggeler	1	3	2	1	2	1	1	2	725
2.	(Germany) David Möller	2	1	1	2	3	2	4	3	655
3.	(Russia) Albert Demtschenko	20	4	DNF	23	1	3	2	1	454
4.	(Germany) Jan Eichhorn	3	2	6	6	5	5	12	7	443
5.	(Austria) Daniel Pfister	4	7	4	3	6	15	3	6	432
6.	(Germany) Felix Loch	5	10	8	12	4		7	15	297
7.	(Austria) Martin Abentung	11	23	9	8	9	7	11	10	288
8.	(Germany) Andi Langenhan	6		5	10	12	6	9	21	282
9.	(Switzerland) Stefan Höhener	13	22	3	4	7	24	21	27	276
10.	(United States) Tony Benshoof	7	15	10	9	16	10	8	16	275
11.	(Germany) Johannes Ludwig	8	11	7	19		4	17	19	250
12.	(Latvia) Guntis Rēķis	23	24	11	18	23	17	6	5	239
13.	(United States) Bengt Walden	9	17	16	11	19	8	15	20	233
14.	(Italy) David Mair	17	26	18	26	15	11	10	8	215
15.	(Italy) Wilfried Huber	16	13	14	16	25	12	14	13	214
16.	(Austria) Christian Eigentler	18	18	30	14	14	14	13	12	203
17.	(Russia) Viktor Kneib	10	8	17	5	8				199
18.	(Latvia) Mārtiņš Rubenis	DNF	5	DNF	15			5	4	196
19.	(Austria) Wolfgang Kindl	14	32	12	7	27		19	9	190
20.	(Canada) Jeff Christie	22	6	13	17	11	13			187

=== Men's doubles ===
Pos.	Luger	LAK	CAL	WIN	IGL	KÖN	ALT	SIG	SIG	Points
1.	(Germany) Patric Leitner / Alexander Resch	2	1	3	1	1	1	6	6	655
2.	(Italy) Christian Oberstolz / Patrick Gruber	6	2	1	2	3	4	2	1	635
3.	(Austria) Andreas Linger / Wolfgang Linger	1	12	7	5	5	2	3	2	528
4.	(Germany) André Florschütz / Torsten Wustlich	4	3	4	3	4	10	1	3	526
5.	(Germany) Tobias Wendl / Tobias Arlt	7	4	5	9	2	3	4	5	470
6.	(Italy) Gerhard Plankensteiner / Oswald Haselrieder	3	8	8	6	6	5	5	4	424
7.	(Austria) Markus Schiegl / Tobias Schiegl	9	5	2	4	12	7	8	7	405
8.	(United States) Christian Niccum / Dan Joye	5	7	6	8	7	8	7	8	369
9.	(Austria) Peter Penz / Georg Fischler	16	6	10	7	8	6	11	18	306
10.	(United States) Mark Grimmette / Brian Martin	14	11	9	12	9	14	14	12	260
11.	(United States) Matt Mortensen / Preston Griffall	8	14	14	10		11	12	9	239
12.	(Latvia) Andris Šics / Juris Šics	12	9	11	23	DNF	21	9	10	218
13.	(Russia) Michail Kuzmich / Stanislav Mikheev	10	15	13	15	10	15	DNF	11	214
14.	(Canada) Chris Moffat / Mike Moffat	11	10	12	13	11	9			205
15.	(Russia) Vladislav Yuzhakov / Vladimir Makhnutin	13	DNF	18	14	16	13	10	13	202
16.	(Ukraine) Andriy Kis / Yuriy Hayduk	18	22	20	21	17	17	13	14	188
17.	(Italy) Hans Peter Fischnaller / Klaus Kofler	15	13	15	11	15	12			174
18.	(Poland) Marcin Piekarski / Grzegorz Piekarski	23	20	22	25	23	19	20	17	162
19.	(Romania) Cosmin Chetroiu / Ionut Taran	20	19	23	22	19	22	20	21	157
20.	(Slovakia) Ján Harnis / Branislav Regec	25	17	17	18	13		DNF	16	142

=== Women's singles ===
Pos.	Luger	LAK	CAL	WIN	IGL	KÖN	ALT	SIG	SIG	Points
1.	(Germany) Tatjana Hüfner	10	1	1	1	1	1	1	1	736
2.	(Germany) Silke Kraushaar-Pielach	1	2	3	2	3	2	2	3	650
3.	(Germany) Natalie Geisenberger	2	3	8	3	2	3	10	4	518
4.	(Germany) Anke Wischnewski	3	4	2	4	4	5	7	8	478
5.	(Austria) Nina Reithmayer	8	7	7	7	8	4	6	6	382
6.	(Ukraine) Natalia Yakushenko	13	11	5	6	5	6	4	7	380
7.	(United States) Erin Hamlin	5	6	6	5	6	12	22	10	347
8.	(Latvia) Maija Tīruma	15	13	9	9	17	10	3	5	319
9.	(Latvia) Anna Orlova	dnf		4	11	25	7	5	2	296
9.	(Austria) Veronika Halder	17	5	13	10	14	8	8	9	296
11.	(Switzerland) Martina Kocher	6	8	10	12	12	9	12	15	289
12.	(United States) Julia Clukey	4	10	15	8	7	18	24	11	284
13.	(Ukraine) Liliya Ludan	9	14	14	13	13	11	9	12	260
14.	(Russia) Alexandra Rodionova	16	12	12	17	11	13	11	13	241
15.	(United States) Megan Sweeney	7	19	21	16	10	14	20	18	221
16.	(United States) Ashley Walden	20	16	11	14	dnf	15	13	14	192
17.	(Italy) Sandra Gasparini	21	20	16	19	16	16	19	20	181
18.	(Japan) Madoka Harada	11	18	20	32	dnf	21	15	16	158
19.	(Slovakia) Veronika Sabolova	23	21	23	20	19	22	21	22	157
20.	(Canada) Regan Lauscher	12	9	19	18	9				155

=== Team Relay ===
Pos.	Team	LAK	WIN	KÖN	SIG	Points
1.	Germany	3	2	1	1	355
2.	United States	1	5	3	5	280
3.	Austria	2	1	dsq	2	270
4.	Latvia	8	3	5	3	237
5.	Russia	5	4	4	4	235
6.	Canada	6	6	2		185
7.	Slovakia	9	7	7	6	181
8.	Romania	11	8	8	8	160
9.	Poland		9	9	7	124
10.	Italy	4	dnf	6	dsq	110
11.	Czech Republic	10	10	dnf		72
12.	Japan	7	dnf		dsq	46
