= FIL World Luge Championships 2009 =

Official logo for the FIL World Luge Championships 2009 that is also used for the FIBT World Championships 2009.

The FIL World Luge Championships 2009 ran on 1–8 February 2009 at the bobsleigh, luge, and skeleton track in Lake Placid, New York, United States for the second time after having hosted the event in 1983. They were awarded the event at the 2006 FIL Congress in Berchtesgaden, Germany.

== Event preparations ==
In a September 17, 2008 interview with FIL, FIL Vice President for Sport Claire DelNegro stated that preparations proceeding well. DelNegro, a former director of the United States Bobsled and Skeleton Federation (headquartered in Lake Placid), stated that she hoped that "...these championships will be a real challenge for all participating nations." A "Scholastic Sliding Challenge" (SSC) organized by the Olympic Regional Development Authority, the Lake Placid bobsleigh, luge, and skeleton track operating authority, and included 22 schools in the Lake Placid area. This program was a continuation of a program that was started at the 2007 World Championships in Igls, Austria that continued at last year's world Championships in Oberhof, Germany. It was also used for the upcoming FIBT World Championships held later in February 2009 on the same track. The track was iced down on October 6, 2008, the earliest it has ever been iced in preparation for both the FIBT and FIL championships. Opening ceremonies took place on 6 February 2009.

== Television coverage ==
Television coverage was provided by the German public TV station ARD as part of their shows on the 7th and the 8th. Eurosport provided live coverage both of the women's singles event on the 6th and of the men's singles on the 7th. Coverage was seen in the United States and Canada on demand with Universal Sports.

== Participating countries ==
As of 21 November 2008, 21 countries agreed to participate in the event. These included the host United States, Germany, Austria, Russia, Czech Republic, Moldova, Italy, Romania, Norway, and Venezuela.

== Luge World Cup leaders ==
As of 2 February 2009, the leaders of the 2008-09 Luge World Cup were as follows:

| Discipline | Leader | Second | Third |
| Men's singles | Armin Zöggeler (ITA) | David Möller (GER) | Jan Eichhorn (GER) |
| Women's singles | Tatjana Hüfner (GER) | Natalie Geisenberger (GER) | Anke Wischnewski (GER) |
| Men's doubles | Italy (Christian Oberstolz & Patrick Gruber) | Germany (Patric Leitner & Alexander Resch) | Austria (Andreas Linger & Wolfgang Linger) |
| Team relay | Germany | Italy | Austria |

== Jury and technical delegates ==
The jury was chaired by Switzerland's Joseph Benz with other members being America's John Mowry and Austria's Markus Schmidt. Technical delegates were headed by Latvia's Einars Fogelis with other members being Slovakia's Walter Marx and Norway's Bjoern Drydahl.

== Men's singles ==
7 February 2009. Run 1 took place 12:15 - 13:55 North American EST (17:15 - 18:55 UTC) while Run 2 took place 14:30 - 15:25 EST (19:30 - 20:25 UTC).

| Medal | Athlete | Time |
|---|---|---|
| Gold | Felix Loch (GER) | 1:44.336 |
| Silver | Armin Zöggeler (ITA) | +0.213 |
| Bronze | Daniel Pfister (AUT) | +0.701 |

Loch repeats as world champion, setting the track record on the first run. Pfister earned his first individual medal at the championships.

== Women's singles ==
6 February 2009. Run 1 took place 13:00 - 14:20 EST (18:00 - 19:20 UTC) while Run 2 took place 14:45 - 15:30 EST (19:45 - 20:30 UTC).

| Medal | Athlete | Time |
|---|---|---|
| Gold | Erin Hamlin (USA) | 1:28.098 |
| Silver | Natalie Geisenberger (GER) | +0.187 |
| Bronze | Natalia Yakushenko (UKR) | +0.236 |

Hamlin set the track record in the second run to become the first non-European and the first American to medal in the women's singles luge event at the Winter Olympic or world championship level. Yakushenko is the first Ukrainian to medal at the championships. Two-time defending world champion Tatjana Hüfner of Germany finished sixth despite setting the start record during the second run. This was the first time a German did not win this event at a World Cup, Winter Olympic, world championship, or European championships since 1997 and the first time in the Winter Olympics, world, or European level since Italy's Gerda Weissensteiner won the women's singles gold medal at the 1994 Winter Olympics in Lillehammer.

== Doubles ==
6 February 2009. Run 1 took place 10:00 - 10:50 EST (15:00 - 15:50 UTC) while Run 2 took place 11:20 - 11:55 EST (16:20 - 16:55 UTC).

| Medal | Athlete | Time |
|---|---|---|
| Gold | Italy (Gerhard Plankensteiner, Oswald Haselrieder) | 1:27.401 |
| Silver | Germany (André Florschütz, Torsten Wustlich) | +0.057 |
| Bronze | United States (Mark Grimmette, Brian Martin) | +0.210 |

The Italians won their first ever championships. Florschütz and Wustlich only trailed Plankensteiner and Haselrieder by 0.008 seconds after the first run. Martin and Grimette won their fifth doubles bronze medal.

== Mixed team relay ==
8 February 2009 from 11:00 to 12:00 EST (16:00 to 17:00 UTC).

| Medal | Team | Time |
|---|---|---|
| Gold | Germany (Felix Loch, Natalie Geisenberger, André Florschütz, Torsten Wustlich) | 2:39.630 |
| Silver | Austria (Daniel Pfister, Nina Reithmeyer, Peter Penz, Georg Fischler) | +1.510 |
| Bronze | Latvia (Guntis Rēķis, Maija Tīruma, Andris Šics, Juris Šics) | +2.869 |

Loch won his second gold of the championships.

== Medal table ==
| Rank | Nation | Gold | Silver | Bronze | Total |
|---|---|---|---|---|---|
| 1 | Germany (GER) | 2 | 2 | 0 | 4 |
| 2 | Italy (ITA) | 1 | 1 | 0 | 2 |
| 3 | United States (USA) | 1 | 0 | 1 | 2 |
| 4 | Austria (AUT) | 0 | 1 | 1 | 2 |
| 5 | Latvia (LAT) | 0 | 0 | 1 | 1 |
| 5 | Ukraine (UKR) | 0 | 0 | 1 | 1 |
| Totals (6 entries) | | 4 | 4 | 4 | 12 |
