= FIL World Luge Championships 2008 =

Official logo of the FIL World Luge Championships 2008

The FIL World Luge Championships 2008 took place January 21-27, 2008 at the bobsleigh, luge, and skeleton track in Oberhof, Germany for the third time after having hosted the event in 1973 and 1985. The relay competition took the place of the team event that had been held at every world championship since 1989. This event had all of teams start at the same part of the track (located at the women's singles/ men's doubles start house), then run down to the finish and tap on a relay marker to exchange from one slider on a team to the next (men's doubles to women's singles to men's singles) with the fastest time winning.

== Event preparations ==
In an effort to prepare for the championships, the track underwent a major renovation in 2006, costing €4 million. Ticket sales at the finish area for all three days were sold out. Besides the competitors, the organizing team consisted of 250 volunteers, 60 security guards, 30 referees, 100 service staff members, 15 tellers, ten drivers, and 30 German Army soldiers and members of the mountain rescue service. Organizing Committee President Bernd Rossmann (spelled Roßmann in Germany) stated that "We can expect 5,000 Visitors each day, but we hope we can reach 10,000 daily. Tickets remain available." 200 media passes were also given out for the event. Television coverage took place live on Eurosport 2, showing the women's singles event, the first run of the men's singles event, and both runs of the men's doubles event.

== Participating nations ==
21 nations entered competitors into the championships, including 42 men's singles, 36 women's singles, and 24 men's doubles. 77 officials were also part of the competitor's list.

- Australia
- Austria
- Bulgaria
- Canada
- Czech Republic
- France
- Germany
- Great Britain
- Italy
- Japan
- South Korea
- Latvia
- Moldova
- Poland
- Romania
- Russia
- Slovakia
- Slovenia
- Switzerland
- Ukraine
- United States

Countries that were planning on competing who withdrew were Argentina, Croatia, Hungary, Sweden, and Venezuela.

== Time tables ==
The current, non-competitive schedule was updated as of January 22, 2008.

- Practice dates for the events took place January 21-25, 2008.
- A church service took place 6 PM CET (17:00 UTC) on the 23rd.
- Opening ceremonies took place 8 PM CET (19:00 UTC) on the 24th. FIL President Josef Fendt declared the event officially open on 8:46 PM CET (19:46 UTC) with fireworks and music as part of the ceremony. Accompanying Fendt was Dieter Althaus, Minister-President of Thuringia.
- Closing ceremonies took place 3 PM CET (14:00 UTC) on the 27th.

== Men's singles ==
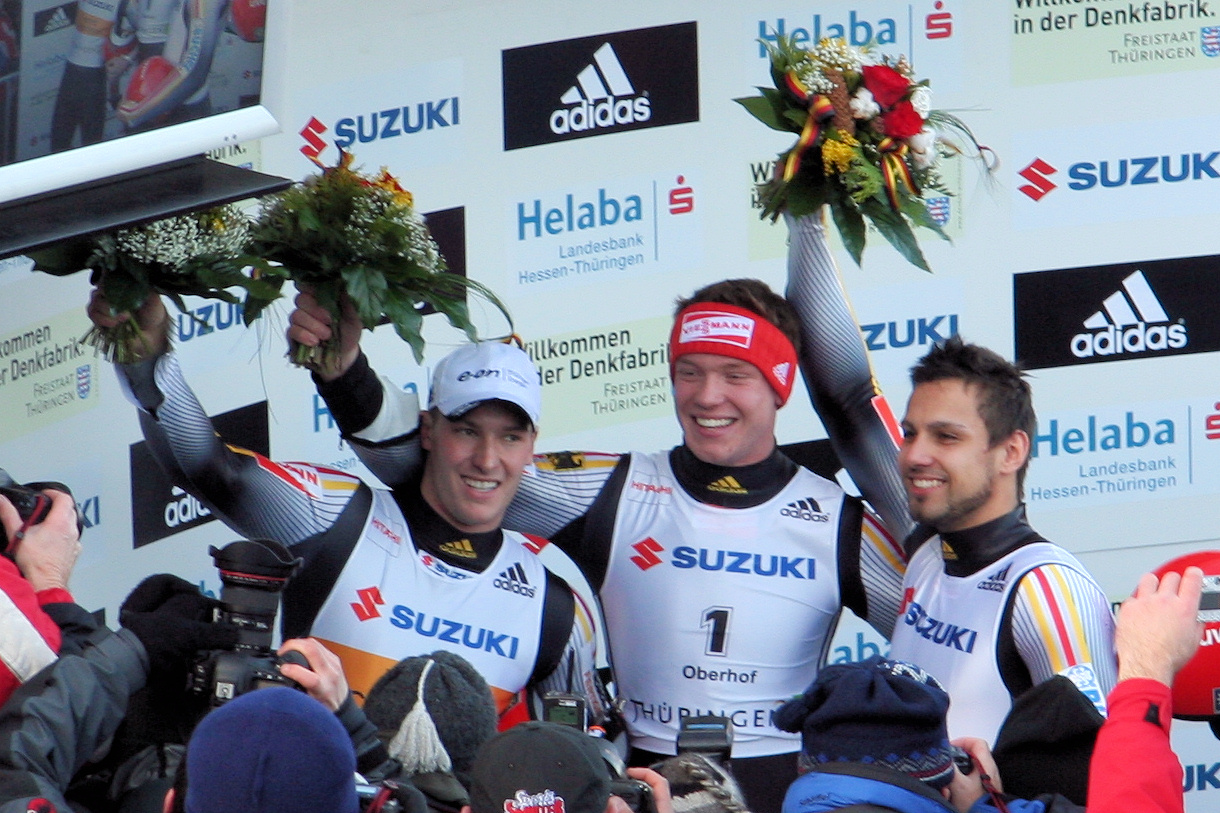
David Möller, Felix Loch and Andi Langenhan at the Flowers Ceremony after the Race

January 26, 2008 at 11 AM CET (10:00 UTC)

Medal	Athlete	Time
Gold	Felix Loch (GER)	1:30.643
Silver	David Möller (GER)	+ 0.074
Bronze	Andi Langenhan (GER)	+ 0.171

Loch becomes the youngest world champion ever.

== Women's singles ==
January 25, 2008 at 2 PM CET (13:00 UTC)

Medal	Athlete	Time
Gold	Tatjana Hüfner (GER)	1:26.007
Silver	Natalie Geisenberger (GER)	+ 0.040
Bronze	Silke Kraushaar-Pielach (GER)	+ 0.142

A retirement ceremony was held prior to the start of the event for four-time women's singles world champion Sylke Otto, who won in 2000, 2001, 2003, and 2005, before retiring prior to last year's world championships in Igls, Austria. Hüfner defended her title despite setting start and track records in the first run only to have current European champion Geisenberger follow up with start and track records of her own on the second run. Kraushaar-Pielach won her tenth and final career medal at the world championships.

== Men's doubles ==
January 27, 2008 at 10 AM CET (09:00 UTC)

Medal	Athlete	Time
Gold	Germany (André Florschütz, Torsten Wustlich)	1:26.893
Silver	Germany (Tobias Wendl, Tobias Arlt)	+ 0.092
Bronze	Austria (Tobias Schiegl, Markus Schiegl)	+ 0.217

This was Florschütz and Wustlich's third world championship in this event, having previously won in 2001 and 2005. This is the first championship medal for the German duo of Wendl and Arlt who set the start record during the second run. It was the seventh medal for the Schiegl brothers. Defending world champions Patric Leitner and Alexander Resch of Germany finished a disappointing 11th place while defending European champions Christian Oberstolz and Patrick Gruber of Italy finished 21st after the first run and did not even qualify for the second run of the event.

== Mixed team relay ==
January 27, 2008 at 1 PM CET (12:00 UTC)

Medal	Team	Time
Gold	Germany (Felix Loch, Tatjana Hüfner, André Florschütz, Torsten Wustlich)	2:29.664
Silver	Austria (Martin Abentung, Nina Reithmeyer, Tobias Schiegl, Markus Schiegl)	+ 0.412
Bronze	Latvia (Guntis Rēķis, Maija Tīruma, Andris Šics, Juris Šics)	+ 0.594

The Germans won their ninth medal of these championships and the first ever mixed team relay event in the world championships.

== Television ratings ==
On January 27, 2008, the German television station ZDF, the mixed team relay had 3.21 million viewers or a 17.6 percent rating while the men's doubles event held earlier that day averaged 2.09 million viewers or an 18.2 percent rating. Felix Loch's victory in the men's singles event drew two million viewers or a 17.4 percent share.

== Medal table ==
Rank	Nation	Gold	Silver	Bronze	Total
1	Germany (GER)	4	3	2	9
2	Austria (AUT)	0	1	1	2
3	Latvia (LAT)	0	0	1	1
Totals (3 entries)		4	4	4	12

== Notes and references ==
- Men's doubles World Champions
- Men's singles World Champions
- Mixed teams World Champions
- Women's singles World Champions
