= Wilczak (surname) =

Wilczak is a Polish-language surname. Notable people with the surname include:

- Becky Wilczak (born 1980) American luger
- Dariusz Wilczak (born 1961), Polish journalist and writer
- Paweł Wilczak (born 1965), Polish actor
