= Sylke Otto =

German luger

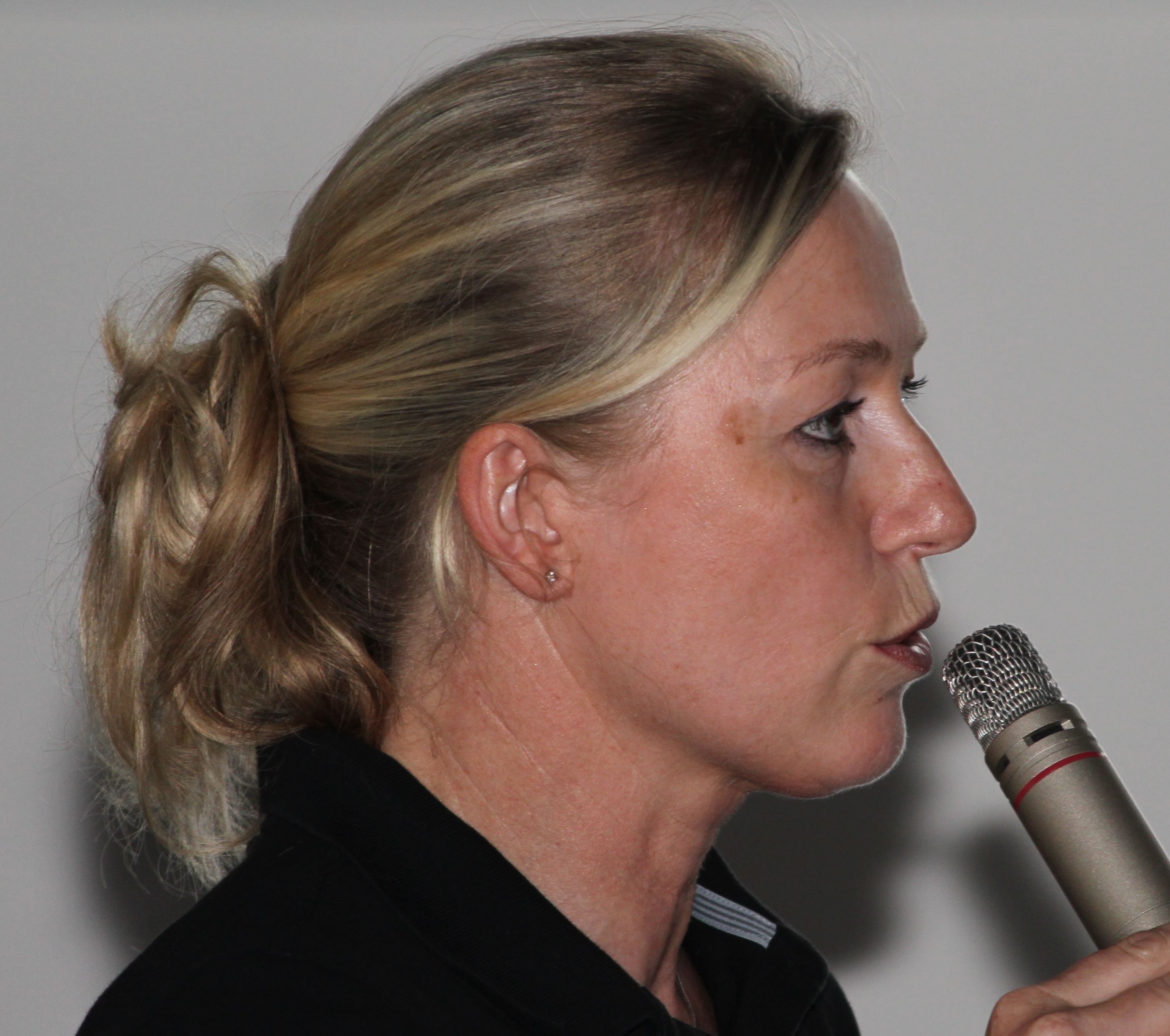
- Otto in 2012

Medal record

Women's luge

Representing Germany

Olympic Games
Gold medal – first place	2002 Salt Lake City	Women's singles
Gold medal – first place	2006 Turin	Women's singles

World Championships
Gold medal – first place	2000 St. Moritz	Women's singles
Gold medal – first place	2001 Calgary	Women's singles
Gold medal – first place	2003 Sigulda	Women's singles
Gold medal – first place	2003 Sigulda	Mixed team
Gold medal – first place	2005 Park City	Women's singles
Gold medal – first place	2005 Park City	Mixed team
Silver medal – second place	1997 Igls	Mixed team
Silver medal – second place	2000 St. Moritz	Mixed team
Silver medal – second place	2001 Calgary	Mixed team
Bronze medal – third place	1999 Königssee	Women's singles
Bronze medal – third place	1999 Königssee	Mixed team
Bronze medal – third place	2004 Nagano	Women's singles

World Cup Championships
Gold medal – first place	1994-95	Women's singles
Gold medal – first place	1999-00	Women's singles
Gold medal – first place	2002-03	Women's singles
Gold medal – first place	2003-04	Women's singles
Silver medal – second place	1998-99	Women's singles
Silver medal – second place	2000-01	Women's singles
Silver medal – second place	2001-02	Women's singles
Silver medal – second place	2005-06	Women's singles
Bronze medal – third place	2004-05	Women's singles

European Championships
Gold medal – first place	1990 Igls	Mixed team
Gold medal – first place	1992 Winterberg	Mixed team
Gold medal – first place	2000 Winterberg	Women's singles
Gold medal – first place	2000 Winterberg	Mixed team
Gold medal – first place	2002 Altenberg	Women's singles
Silver medal – second place	1992 Winterberg	Women's singles
Silver medal – second place	2002 Altenberg	Mixed team
Bronze medal – third place	2004 Oberhof	Women's singles

Sylke Otto (born 7 July 1969) is a German former luger who competed from 1991 to 2007. She was born in Karl-Marx-Stadt. Competing in three Winter Olympics, she won the gold medal in the women's singles event in 2002 and 2006.

Otto won twelve medals at the FIL World Luge Championships with six golds (Women's singles: 2000, 2001, 2003, 2005; Mixed team: 2003, 2005), three silvers (Mixed team: 1997, 2000, 2001), and three bronzes (Women's singles: 1999, 2004; Mixed team: 1999).

She also won eight medals at the FIL European Luge Championships with five golds (Women's singles: 2000, 2002; Mixed team: 1990, 1992, 2000), two silvers (Women's singles: 1992, Mixed team: 2002), and one bronze (Women's singles: 2004). Otto finished in the top three of the Luge World Cup standings every year from 1999 to 2006, winning the overall title four times (1994-5, 1999–2000, 2002–3, 2003–4). She won a record 37 World Cup races in total during her career.

== Retirement ==
She retired from the sport on 12 January 2007, partly in order to have children and partly because of a crash at Königssee, Germany, the previous week and witnessing another crash, by Russia's Albert Demtschenko at Oberhof, that same week. Otto had initially planned on retiring at the World Luge Championships in Igls, Austria (Located southeast of Innsbruck) in February, but the accidents changed her plans. She has one daughter, Sina, born on 29 May 2007. A retirement ceremony for Otto took place prior to the start of the women's singles event at the 2008 FIL World Luge Championships in Oberhof, Germany on 25 January.

== Other information ==
Otto was one of the torch bearers for the 2004 Summer Olympics in Athens, Greece, as it traveled through Berlin, Germany.
