= Luge at the 2006 Winter Olympics =

Luge at the XX Olympic Winter Games
- Venue: Cesana Pariol
- Dates: 11–15 February 2006
- No. of events: 3
- Competitors: 108 from 24 nations

The Luge competition at the 2006 Winter Olympic Games was held at Cesana Pariol in Cesana, Italy. Three events were staged, taking place from February 11 to February 15. These were the first games where a qualifying system was used to determine the enterants into the games.

== Medal summary ==
=== Medal table ===
Rank	Nation	Gold	Silver	Bronze	Total
1	Germany	1	2	1	4
2	Italy	1	0	1	2
3	Austria	1	0	0	1
4	Russia	0	1	0	1
5	Latvia	0	0	1	1
Totals (5 entries)		3	3	3	9

=== Events ===
Event	Gold	Silver	Bronze
Men's singles	Armin Zöggeler; Italy	Albert Demtschenko; Russia	Mārtiņš Rubenis; Latvia
Women's singles	Sylke Otto; Germany	Silke Kraushaar; Germany	Tatjana Hüfner; Germany
Doubles	Austria; Andreas Linger; Wolfgang Linger	Germany; André Florschütz; Torsten Wustlich	Italy; Gerhard Plankensteiner; Oswald Haselrieder

== Participating NOCs ==
Twenty-four nations competed in the luge events at Torino.

- Argentina (1)
- Australia (1)
- Austria (10)
- Bulgaria (1)
- Canada (10)
- Czech Republic (4)
- Germany (10)
- Great Britain (2)
- India (1)
- Italy (9)
- Japan (5)
- South Korea (1)
- Latvia (8)
- Moldova (1)
- Poland (3)
- Romania (4)
- Russia (10)
- Slovenia (1)
- Switzerland (2)
- Slovakia (6)
- Chinese Taipei (1)
- Ukraine (6)
- United States (10)
- Venezuela (1)
