= Christian Eigentler =

Austrian luger (born 1983)

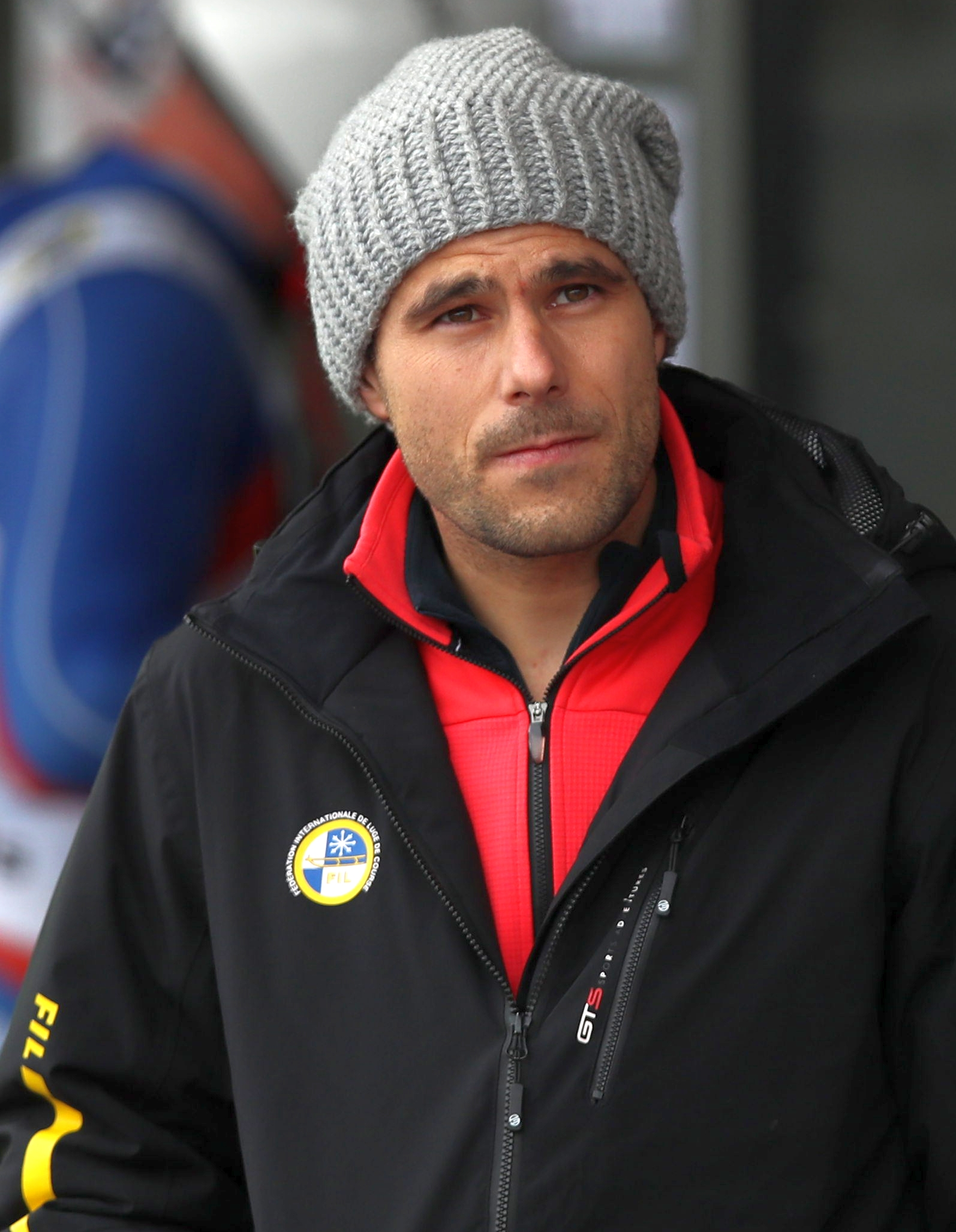
Eigentler in 2019

Christian Eigentler (born August 24, 1983) is an Austrian luger who has competed since 1995. He finished 17th in the men's singles event at the 2007 FIL World Luge Championships in Igls, Austria.

Eigentler also finished tenth in the men's singles event at the 2006 FIL European Luge Championships in Winterberg, Germany.

Eigentler's best Luge World Cup overall finish was 16th in 2007-8.
