= Luge at the 2002 Winter Olympics =

Luge at the XIX Olympic Winter Games
- Venue: Utah Olympic Park
- Dates: 10–14 February 2002
- No. of events: 3
- Competitors: 110 from 26 nations

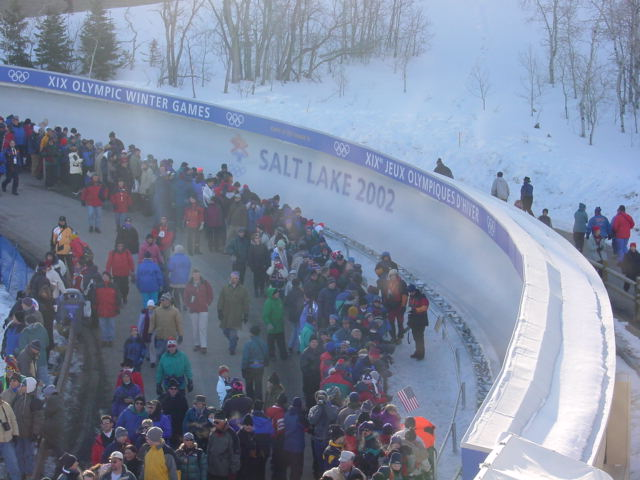
Luge at the Utah Olympic Park on 15 February 2002.

The Luge competition at the 2002 Winter Olympic Games was held at Utah Olympic Park in Park City. Three events were staged, taking place from 10 to 14 February.

== Medal summary ==
=== Medal table ===
| Rank | Nation | Gold | Silver | Bronze | Total |
|---|---|---|---|---|---|
| 1 | Germany | 2 | 2 | 1 | 5 |
| 2 | Italy | 1 | 0 | 0 | 1 |
| 3 | United States | 0 | 1 | 1 | 2 |
| 4 | Austria | 0 | 0 | 1 | 1 |
| Totals (4 entries) | | 3 | 3 | 3 | 9 |

=== Events ===
| Event | Gold | Silver | Bronze |
|---|---|---|---|
| Men's singles | Armin Zöggeler; Italy | Georg Hackl; Germany | Markus Prock; Austria |
| Women's singles | Sylke Otto; Germany | Barbara Niedernhuber; Germany | Silke Kraushaar; Germany |
| Doubles | Germany; Patric Leitner; Alexander Resch | United States; Mark Grimmette; Brian Martin | United States; Chris Thorpe; Clay Ives |

=== Participating NOCs ===
Twenty-five nations competed in the luge events at Salt Lake City.

- Argentina
- Austria
- Bermuda
- Brazil
- Canada
- Chinese Taipei
- Czech Republic
- France
- Germany
- Great Britain
- India
- Italy
- Japan
- Latvia
- Moldova
- New Zealand
- Romania
- Russia
- Slovakia
- South Korea
- Sweden
- Switzerland
- United States
- Venezuela
- Virgin Islands
