= Taras Senkiv =

Taras Senkiv may refer to:

- Taras Senkiv (bishop) (born 1960), Ukrainian Greek-Catholic hierarch, bishop of Stryi
- Taras Senkiv (luger) (born 1989), Ukrainian luger
