= Grzegorz Piekarski =

Polish luger (born 1986)

Grzegorz Piekarski (born 23 December 1986 in Gorzów Wielkopolski) is a Polish luger who has competed since 2001. His best Luge World Cup finish was 18th in men's doubles in 2007-08.

Piekarski also finished 19th in the men's doubles event at the 2008 FIL World Luge Championships in Oberhof.
