= Sonja Wiedemann =

German luger

Medal record

Luge

Representing Germany

World Championships
Gold medal – first place	1999 Königssee	Women's singles
Bronze medal – third place	2000 St. Moritz	Women's singles

European Championships
Silver medal – second place	2000 Winterberg	Mixed team

Sonja Wiedemann (born 8 September 1977) is a German luger who competed from 1999 to 2005. She won two medals in the women's singles at the FIL World Luge Championships with a gold in 1999 and a bronze in 2000.

Wiedemann also won a silver medal in the mixed team event at the 2000 FIL European Luge Championships in Winterberg, Germany.
