= Barbara Niedernhuber =

German luger (born 1974)

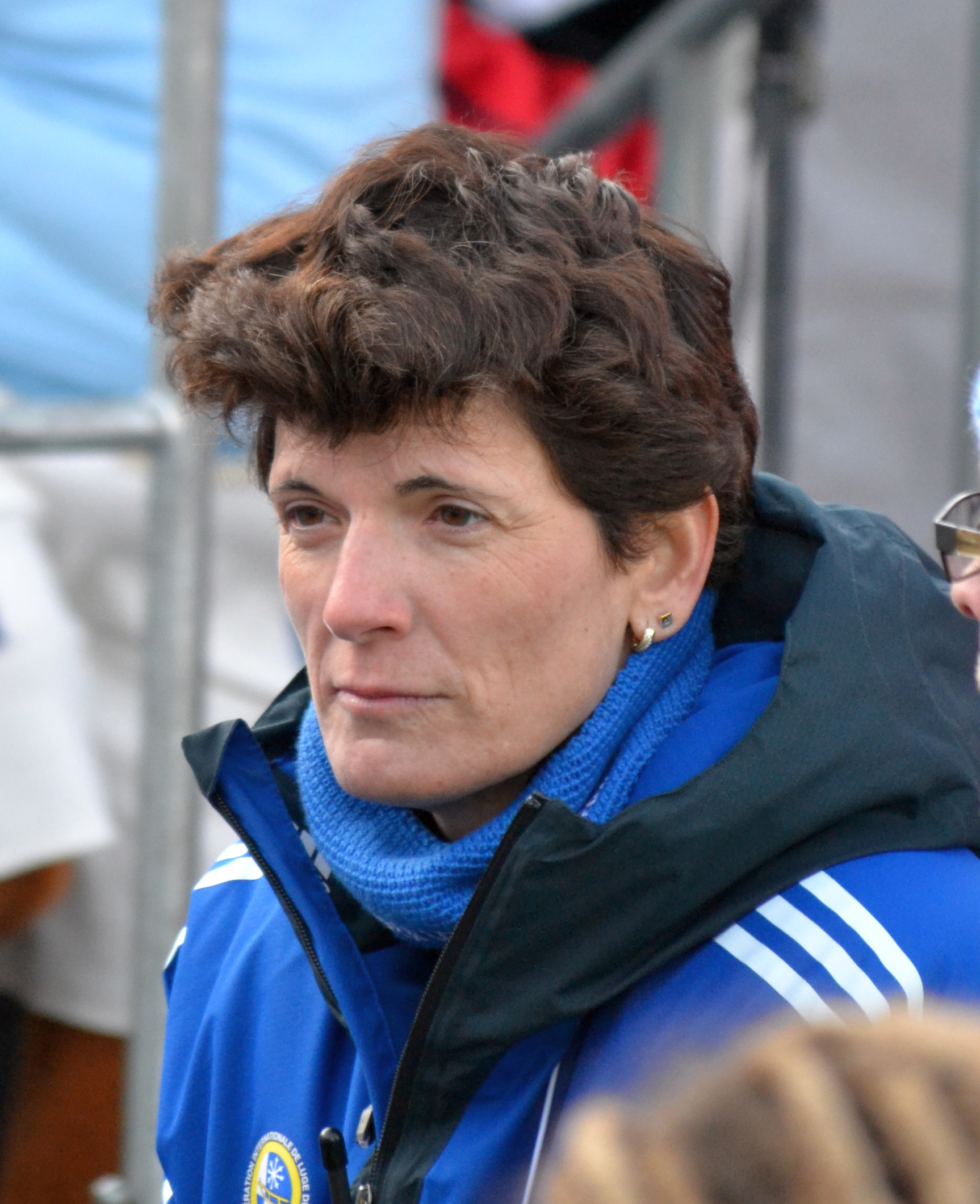
- Niedernhuber at the 2015 Luge World Cup in Altenberg

Medal record

Women's Luge

Representing Germany

Olympic Games
Silver medal – second place	1998 Nagano	Women's singles
Silver medal – second place	2002 Salt Lake City	Women's singles

World Championships
Gold medal – first place	2004 Nagano	Mixed team
Silver medal – second place	1999 Königssee	Women's singles
Silver medal – second place	2000 St. Moritz	Women's singles
Silver medal – second place	2004 Nagano	Women's singles
Silver medal – second place	2005 Park City	Women's singles
Bronze medal – third place	2001 Calgary	Women's singles
Bronze medal – third place	2003 Sigulda	Women's singles

World Cup Championships
Gold medal – first place	2004-05	Women's singles
Bronze medal – third place	1998–99	Women's singles
Bronze medal – third place	1999-00	Women's singles
Bronze medal – third place	2001-02	Women's singles
Bronze medal – third place	2002-03	Women's singles
Bronze medal – third place	2003-04	Women's singles

European Championships
Bronze medal – third place	2000 Winterberg	Women's singles
Bronze medal – third place	2002 Altenberg	Women's singles
Bronze medal – third place	2006 Winterberg	Women's singles

Barbara Niedernhuber (nicknamed Babsi; born 6 June 1974 in Berchtesgaden) is a German luger who competed from 1994 to 2006. She won two silver medals in the women's singles event at the Winter Olympics (1998 (she was beaten by 2 thousandths of a second by her teammate, Silke Kraushaar), 2002). A favorite to make the 2006 Winter Olympics, she was upset at the national championships by Tatjana Hüfner in late 2005.

Niedernhuber also won seven medals at the FIL World Luge Championships with one gold (Mixed team: 2004), four silvers (Women's singles: 1999, 2000, 2004, 2005), and two bronzes (Women's singles: 2001, 2003). She also won three bronze medals in the women's singles event at the FIL European Luge Championships (2000, 2002, 2006).

Niedernhuber won the overall Luge World Cup title in women's singles in 2004–05.

Niedernhuber retired abruptly before the start of the 2006–07 World Cup season due to a bacterial infection in her ankle joint that developed after surgery during the summer of 2006.

== Cultural references ==
- In The Simpsons episode "The Bart of War", Milhouse mentions he feels "like luge silver medalist Barbara Niedernhuber" while riding Flanders' video cart.
