= Robert Taleanu =

Romanian luger (born 1979)

Personal information
- Nationality: Romanian
- Born: 9 July 1979 (age 45); Bușteni, Romania

Sport
- Sport: Luge

Robert Taleanu (born 9 July 1979) is a Romanian luger. He competed in the men's doubles event at the 2002 Winter Olympics.
