= Ivars Deinis =

Latvian luger (born 1977)

Personal information
- Nationality: Latvian
- Born: 2 April 1977 (age 47); Aizkraukle, Latvia

Sport
- Sport: Luge

Ivars Deinis (born 2 April 1977) is a Latvian luger. He competed in the men's doubles event at the 2002 Winter Olympics.
