= Silke Kraushaar-Pielach =

German luger (born 1970)

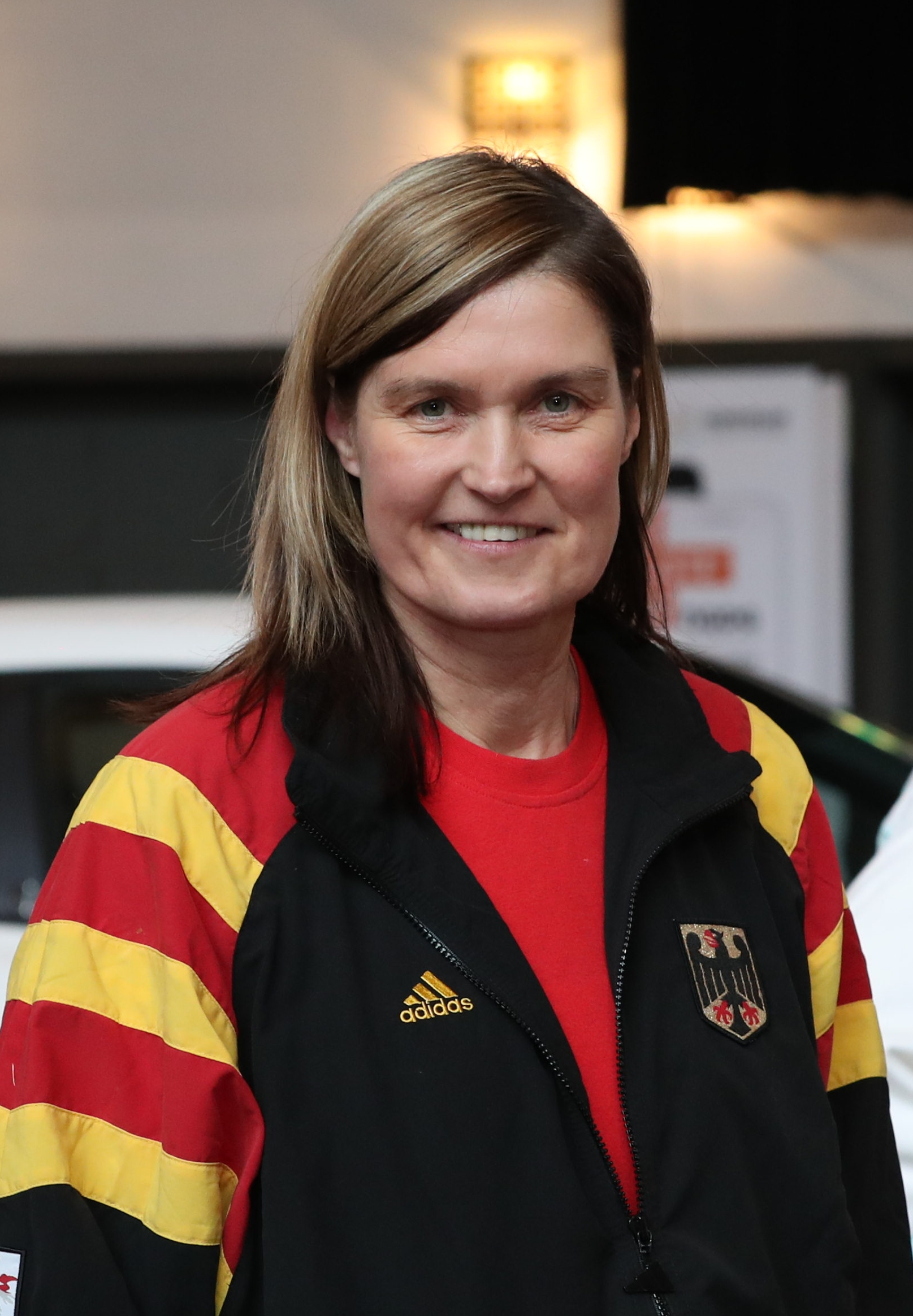
- Kraushaar-Pielach in 2018

Personal information
- Born: 10 October 1970 (age 56) Sonneberg, Bezirk Suhl, East Germany
Medal record
Women's luge
Representing Germany
Olympic Games
Gold medal – first place	1998 Nagano	Women's singles
Silver medal – second place	2006 Turin	Women's singles
Bronze medal – third place	2002 Salt Lake City	Women's singles
World Championships
Gold medal – first place	2000 St. Moritz	Mixed team
Gold medal – first place	2001 Calgary	Mixed team
Gold medal – first place	2004 Nagano	Women's singles
Gold medal – first place	2007 Igls	Mixed team
Silver medal – second place	1997 Igls	Mixed team
Silver medal – second place	1999 Königssee	Mixed team
Silver medal – second place	2000 St. Moritz	Women's singles
Silver medal – second place	2001 Calgary	Women's singles
Bronze medal – third place	2007 Igls	Women's singles
Bronze medal – third place	2008 Oberhof	Women's singles
World Cup Championships
Gold medal – first place	1998-99	Women's singles
Gold medal – first place	2000-01	Women's singles
Gold medal – first place	2001-02	Women's singles
Gold medal – first place	2005-06	Women's singles
Gold medal – first place	2006-07	Women's singles
Silver medal – second place	1997-98	Women's singles
Silver medal – second place	1999-00	Women's singles
Silver medal – second place	2002-03	Women's singles
Silver medal – second place	2003-04	Women's singles
Silver medal – second place	2004-05	Women's singles
Silver medal – second place	2007-08	Women's singles
European Championships
Gold medal – first place	1998 Oberhof	Women's singles
Gold medal – first place	1998 Oberhof	Mixed team
Gold medal – first place	2002 Altenberg	Mixed team
Gold medal – first place	2004 Oberhof	Women's singles
Gold medal – first place	2004 Oberhof	Mixed team
Gold medal – first place	2006 Winterberg	Women's singles
Gold medal – first place	2006 Winterberg	Mixed team
Silver medal – second place	2000 Winterberg	Women's singles
Silver medal – second place	2002 Altenberg	Women's singles
Silver medal – second place	2008 Cesana	Women's singles

Silke Kraushaar-Pielach (born Silke Kraushaar on 10 October 1970 in Sonneberg, Bezirk Suhl) is a German luger who competed from 1995 to 2008. In June 2008, she was named sports manager for the luge section of Bob- und Schlittenverband für Deutschland (BSD - German bobsleigh, luge, and skeleton federation).

== Sporting career ==
Competing in three Winter Olympics, Kraushaar-Pielach won a complete set of medals in the women's singles event with a gold in 1998 (when she beat her team-mate Barbara Niedernhuber by 2 thousandths of a second), a silver in 2006, and a bronze in 2002.

She also won ten medals at the FIL World Luge Championships with four golds (Women's singles: 2004, Mixed team: 2000, 2001, 2007), four silvers (Women's singles: 2000, 2001; Mixed team: 1997, 1999), and two bronze (Women's singles: 2007, 2008).

Kraushaar-Pielach won ten medals at the FIL European Luge Championships, including seven golds (Women's singles: 1998, 2004, 2006; Mixed team: 1998, 2000, 2004, 2006) and three silvers (Women's singles: 2000, 2002, 2008).

She also won the overall Luge World Cup five times (1998-9, 2000-1, 2001-2, 2005-6, 2006-7). Kraushaar-Pielach started her last season off with a win in the women's singles event at Lake Placid, New York, on 16 November 2007. Her last race in Sigulda, Latvia, on 16 February 2008 saw her finishing third, the same place where she won her first World Cup event on 30 November 1996.

== Sports official ==
In June 2008, Kraushaar-Pielach was named manager of the luge section of the BSD, the German bobsleigh, luge, and skeleton federation.

== Personal life ==
She married German businessman Michael Pielach on 7 July 2006. It was announced on FIL's website on 24 January 2008 that the sled that she had competed with until 1995 had been auctioned on the German version of eBay from 19 to 26 January. Kraushaar-Pielach stated that the proceeds from the auction would be used to benefit young luge. The sled sold for € 1160 and the proceeds went to her sledding club in Oberhof.
