= FIL European Luge Championships 2000 =

The FIL European Luge Championships 2000 took place in Winterberg, Germany for the third time having hosted the event previously in 1982 and 1992. The team event format was reduced to one run each in men's doubles, men's singles, and women's singles for the total time.

== Medalists ==
Event	Gold		Silver		Bronze	
Men's singles	Jens Müller; Germany	1:50.273	Georg Hackl; Germany	1:50.512	Armin Zöggeler; Italy	1:50.570
Women's singles	Sylke Otto; Germany	1:29.008	Silke Kraushaar; Germany	1:29.499	Barbara Niedernhuber; Germany	1:29.534
Doubles	Germany; Patric Leitner; Alexander Resch	1:28.478	Germany; Steffen Skel; Steffen Wöller	1:28.920	Austria; Tobias Schiegl; Markus Schiegl	1:29.019
Mixed team	Germany; Georg Hackl; Sylke Otto; Patric Leitner / Alexander Resch		Germany; Karsten Albert; Sonja Wiedemann; Steffen Skel / Steffen Wöller		Italy; Armin Zöggeler; Natalie Obkircher; Gerhard Plankensteiner / Oswald Haselrieder	

== Medal table ==
* Host nation (Germany)

Rank	Nation	Gold	Silver	Bronze	Total
1	Germany*	4	4	1	9
2	Italy	0	0	2	2
3	Austria	0	0	1	1
Totals (3 entries)		4	4	4	12
