= Steffen Skel =

German luger (born 1972)

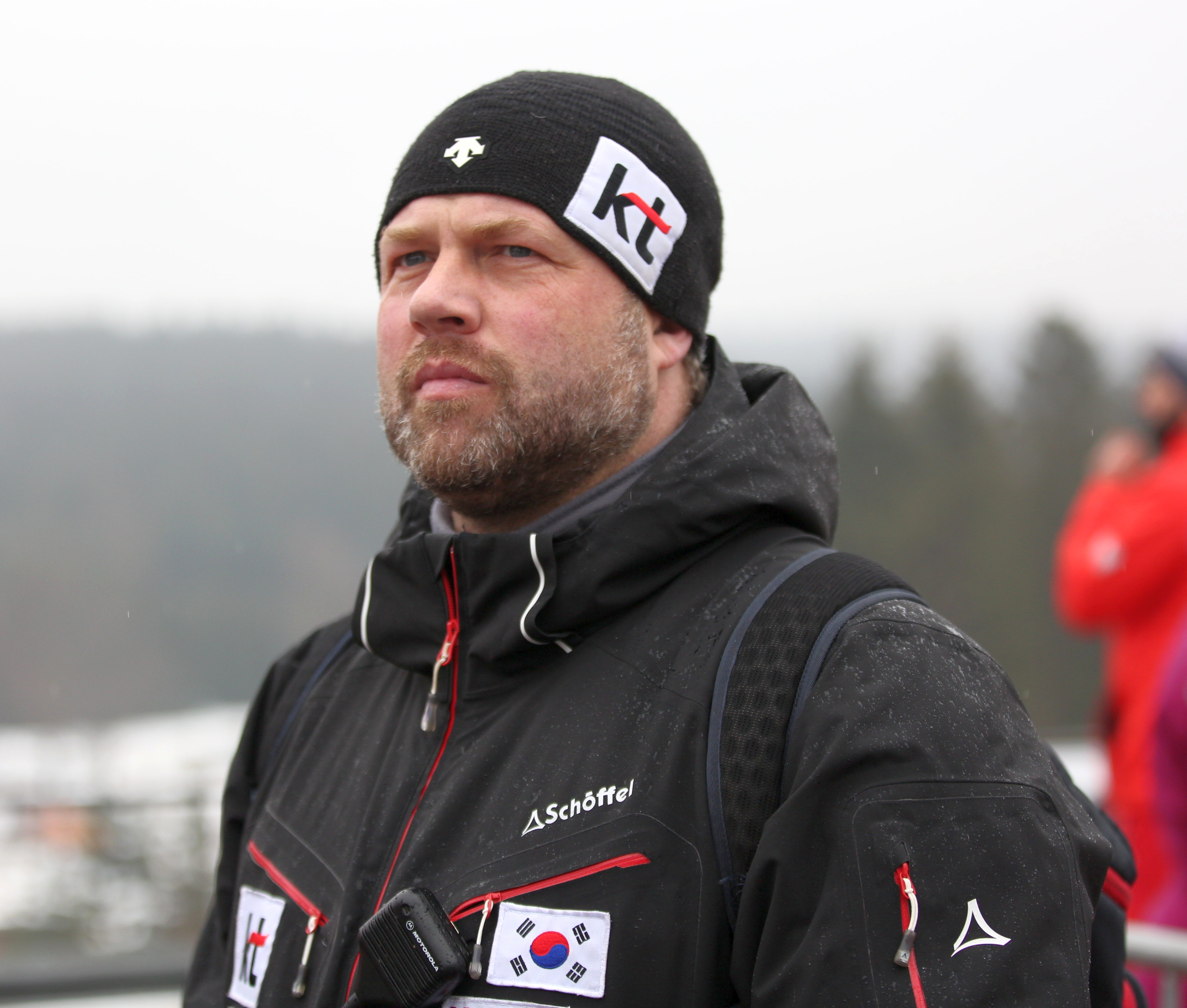
- Skel in 2017

Medal record

Men's luge

Representing Germany

World Championships
Gold medal – first place	2000 St. Moritz	Mixed team
Silver medal – second place	2000 St. Moritz	Men's doubles
Silver medal – second place	2001 Calgary	Men's doubles
Silver medal – second place	2001 Calgary	Mixed team
Bronze medal – third place	1997 Igls	Men's doubles

World Cup Championships
Gold medal – first place	2000-01	Men's doubles
Silver medal – second place	1999-00	Men's doubles
Silver medal – second place	2001-02	Men's doubles
Bronze medal – third place	1993-94	Men's doubles

European Championships
Gold medal – first place	2002 Altenberg	Mixed team
Gold medal – first place	2004 Oberhof	Men's doubles
Gold medal – first place	2004 Oberhof	Mixed team
Silver medal – second place	1998 Oberhof	Men's doubles
Silver medal – second place	2000 Winterberg	Men's doubles
Silver medal – second place	2000 Winterberg	Mixed team

Steffen Sartor (née Skel, born 14 June 1972, in Bad Salzungen, Bezirk Suhl) is a German luger who competed from 1992 to 2004. He was a doubles specialised who formed a successful partnership with Steffen Wöller during the 1990s and early 2000. He won five medals at the FIL World Luge Championships with one gold (Mixed team: 2000), three silvers (Men's doubles: 2000, 2001; Mixed team: 2001), and one bronze (Men's doubles: 1997).

Skel also won six medals at the FIL European Luge Championships with three golds (Mixed team: 2002, 2004, 2006) and three silvers (Men's doubles: 1998, 2000; Mixed team: 2000).

His best finish at the Winter Olympics was fourth in the men's doubles event at Salt Lake City in 2002.

Skel won the overall Luge World Cup men's doubles title in 2000-1.

Following his retirement from competition, he became a luge coach for the Canadian, German and Swiss federations. In 2013 he was appointed as the coach for the South Korean luge team on a contract running until 2018.

He is married to former skeleton slider Diana Sartor. The couple have two children: Malin and Silas.
