= Luboš Jíra =

Czech luger (born 1990)

Luboš Jíra (born 2 April 1990 in Kadaň) is a Czech luger who has competed since 2000. He finished 15th in the men's doubles event at the FIL European Luge Championships 2010 in Sigulda.

Jíra qualified for the 2010 Winter Olympics where he finished 18th.
