= FIL World Luge Championships 2000 =

The FIL World Luge Championships 2000 took place in St. Moritz, Switzerland. This marked the only time since the 1981 world championships that the event has taken place on a naturally refrigerated track.

== Men's singles ==
Medal	Athlete	Time
Gold	Jens Müller (GER)	
Silver	Armin Zöggeler (ITA)	
Bronze	Georg Hackl (GER)	

== Women's singles ==
Medal	Athlete	Time
Gold	Sylke Otto (GER)	
Silver	Barbara Niedernhuber (GER)	
Bronze	Sonja Wiedemann (GER)	

== Men's doubles ==
Medal	Athlete	Time
Gold	Germany (Patric Leitner, Alexander Resch)	
Silver	Germany (Steffen Skel, Steffen Wöller)	
Bronze	United States (Mark Grimmette, Brian Martin)	

== Mixed team ==
Medal	Athlete	Time
Gold	Germany (Georg Hackl, Silke Kraushaar, Steffen Skel, Steffen Wöller)	
Silver	Germany (Jens Müller, Sylke Otto, Patric Leitner, Alexander Resch)	
Bronze	Austria (Markus Prock, Angelika Tagwerker, Tobias Schiegl, Markus Schiegl)	

== Medal table ==
Rank	Nation	Gold	Silver	Bronze	Total
1	Germany (GER)	4	3	2	9
2	Italy (ITA)	0	1	0	1
3	Austria (AUT)	0	0	1	1
3	United States (USA)	0	0	1	1
Totals (4 entries)		4	4	4	12
