= Becky Wilczak =

American luger

Medal record

Luge

Representing the United States

World Championships
Bronze medal – third place	2001 Calgary	Mixed team

Rebecca "Becky" Wilczak (born August 5, 1980, in Berwyn, Illinois) is an American luger who competed in the late 1990s and early 2000s. She won the bronze medal in the mixed team event at the 2001 FIL World Luge Championships in Calgary, Alberta, Canada

Wilczak also finished fifth in the women's singles event at the 2002 Winter Olympics in Salt Lake City. Prior to those games, she was dealing with the need for a liver transplant for her father, Tom.

Wilczak later transitioned into teaching. She began as a high school biology teacher before moving to a middle school setting. She now teaches Geometry Honors at Clarendon Hills Middle School.
