= FIL European Luge Championships 2010 =

The FIL European Luge Championships 2010 took place 19 – 24 January 2010 in Sigulda, Latvia for the second time, hosting the event previously in 1996.

== Festivities ==
The opening ceremonies took place on 22 January 2010 at 19:00 EET. Award ceremonies for all events were held at the end of each day of competition.

== Men's singles ==
24 January 2010 at 09:40 EET (Run 1) and 11:30 EET. Demtschenko set the track record in the first run and had the fastest time in the second run to win his third straight medal. Germany's Johannes Ludwig had the fastest start times in both runs, but could only manage fifth. Kindl and Pfister earned their first individual medals while defending champion Armin Zöggeler of Italy did not participate in preparation for the 2010 Winter Olympics in Vancouver.

Medal	Athlete	Time
Gold	Albert Demtschenko (RUS)	1:36.748
Silver	Wolfgang Kindl (AUT)	1:36.974
Bronze	Daniel Pfister (AUT)	1:37.062

== Women's singles ==
23 January 2010 at 09:30 EET (Run 1) and 11:15 EET (Run 2). The German women's team withdrew prior to the championships in an effort to focus on training for the 2010 Winter Olympics though they participated in the final luge World Cup event of the season at Cesana Pariol the following weekend. Ivanova becomes the first Russian to medal in this event at the championships, the first Soviet-Russian since Vera Zozula in 1976, and the first non-German to win since Italy's Gerda Weissensteiner in 1994.

Medal	Athlete	Time
Gold	Tatiana Ivanova (RUS)	1:25.517
Silver	Corinna Martini (GER)	1:25.842
Bronze	Nina Reithmayer (AUT)	1:26.007

== Men's doubles ==
23 January 2010 at 12:30 EET (Run 1) and 13:45 EET (Run 2). The defending Olympic champions won gold to give them a complete set of medals after winning silver in 2008 and bronze in 2004. It was also Austria's first gold medal at the championships since 2002 and the first in this event at the championships since 1982.

Medal	Athlete	Time
Gold	Austria (Andreas Linger, Wolfgang Linger)	1:24.415
Silver	Germany (Tobias Wendl, Tobias Arlt)	1:24.977
Bronze	Austria (Tobias Schiegl, Markus Schiegl)	1:25.023

== Mixed team relay ==
24 January 2010 at 13:45 EET. Latvia repeated as champions. Only seven teams competed in the event though Slovakia was disqualified during the women's singles part of the run.

Medal	Athlete	Time
Gold	Latvia; Anna Orlova; Mārtiņš Rubenis; Andris Šics / Juris Šics	2:16.992; 44.443; 46.127; 46.422
Silver	Austria; Veronika Halder; Wolfgang Kindl; Andreas Linger / Wolfgang Linger	2:17.022; 44.612; 46.216; 46.194
Bronze	Germany; Corinna Martini; Johannes Ludwig; Tobias Wendl / Tobias Arlt	2:17.076; 44.518; 46.199; 46.359

== Medal table ==
* Host nation (Latvia)

Rank	Nation	Gold	Silver	Bronze	Total
1	Russia	2	0	0	2
2	Austria	1	2	3	6
3	Latvia*	1	0	0	1
4	Germany	0	2	1	3
Totals (4 entries)		4	4	4	12
