= FIL World Luge Championships 2001 =

FIL 2001 luge competition results

The FIL World Luge Championships 2001 took place in Calgary, Alberta, Canada, for the third time after hosting the event previously in 1990 and 1993.

== Men's singles ==
Medal	Athlete	Time
Gold	Armin Zöggeler (ITA)	
Silver	Georg Hackl (GER)	
Bronze	Markus Prock (AUT)	

== Women's singles ==
Medal	Athlete	Time
Gold	Sylke Otto (GER)	
Silver	Silke Kraushaar (GER)	
Bronze	Barbara Niedernhuber (GER)	

== Men's doubles ==
Medal	Athlete	Time
Gold	Germany (André Florschütz, Torsten Wustlich)	
Silver	Germany (Steffen Skel, Steffen Wöller)	
Bronze	Austria (Tobias Schiegl, Markus Schiegl)	

== Mixed team ==
Medal	Athlete	Time
Gold	Germany (Georg Hackl, Silke Kraushaar, Patric Leitner, Alexander Resch)	
Silver	Germany (Karsten Albert, Sylke Otto, Steffen Skel, Steffen Wöller)	
Bronze	United States (Tony Benshoof, Becky Wilczak, Mark Grimmette, Brian Martin)	

== Medal table ==
Rank	Nation	Gold	Silver	Bronze	Total
1	Germany (GER)	3	4	1	8
2	Italy (ITA)	1	0	0	1
3	Austria (AUT)	0	0	2	2
4	United States (USA)	0	0	1	1
Totals (4 entries)		4	4	4	12
