= Wolfgang Linger =

Austrian luger (born 1982)

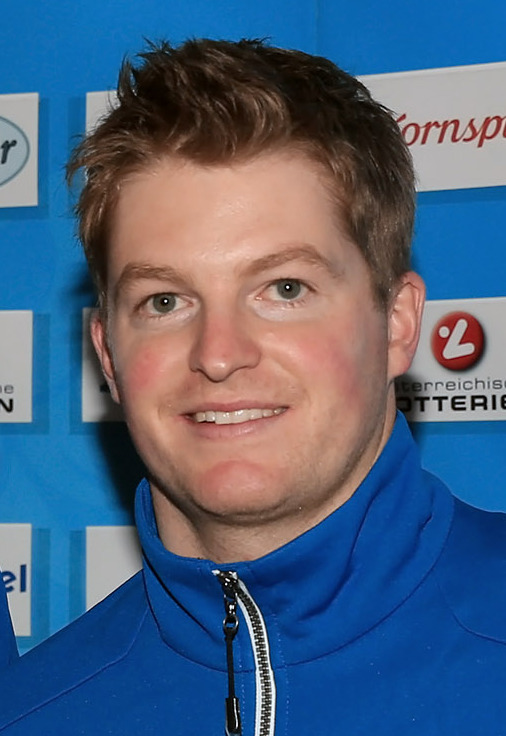
- Linger in 2014

Medal record

Men's luge

Representing Austria

Olympic Games
Gold medal – first place	2006 Turin	Men's doubles
Gold medal – first place	2010 Vancouver	Men's doubles
Silver medal – second place	2014 Sochi	Men's doubles

World Championships
Gold medal – first place	2003 Sigulda	Men's doubles
Gold medal – first place	2011 Cesana	Men's doubles
Gold medal – first place	2012 Altenberg	Men's doubles
Bronze medal – third place	2003 Sigulda	Mixed team
Bronze medal – third place	2013 Whistler	Men's doubles

World Cup Championships
Gold medal – first place	2011–12	Men's doubles
Silver medal – second place	2010–11	Men's doubles
Bronze medal – third place	2004–05	Men's doubles
Bronze medal – third place	2007–08	Men's doubles
Bronze medal – third place	2008–09	Men's doubles

European Championships
Gold medal – first place	2010 Sigulda	Men's doubles
Silver medal – second place	2008 Cesana	Men's doubles
Silver medal – second place	2008 Cesana	Mixed team
Silver medal – second place	2010 Sigulda	Mixed team
Bronze medal – third place	2004 Oberhof	Men's doubles
Bronze medal – third place	2004 Oberhof	Mixed team
Bronze medal – third place	2014 Sigulda	Men's doubles

Wolfgang Linger (born 4 November 1982 in Hall in Tirol) is an Austrian former luger who competed internationally since 2000. As young children, he and his older brother Andreas learned to luge on a former Olympic luge track, and at age 14 began competing as a doubles team for the first time. Linger has won five medals at the FIL World Luge Championships with three golds (Men's doubles: 2003, 2011 and 2012) and two bronzes (Mixed team: 2003 and men's doubles: 2013). He also earned seven medals at the FIL European Luge Championships with a gold (Men's doubles: 2010), three silvers (Men's doubles: 2008, Mixed team: 2008, 2010), and three bronzes (Men's doubles: 2004 and 2014, Mixed team: 2004). The Lingers were overall Luge World Cup men's doubles champions in 2011-12 and scored 15 World Cup race victories. In 2005, he broke his leg in a crash, but the next year at the 2006 Winter Olympics in Turin, Italy won the gold medal in doubles luge. He repeated this feat at the 2010 Winter Olympics in Vancouver, Canada, defeating another team of brothers, Andris and Juris Šics of Latvia.

== Athletic career ==
=== Introduction to luge ===
Wolfgang was nine years old when he tried an artificial luge track for the first time, on a track that had been used for Olympic events in 1964 and 1976. His brother was one of the few other members of their local luge club who tried it. Five years later, when they were both 14, they were allowed to try doubles luge for the first time. Despite competing as individuals or in mixed doubles in some events, the Wolfgang and Andreas have seen their most significant success as a doubles team.

=== 2002–2004 ===
The Linger brothers placed 8th in the 2002 Winter Olympics in Salt Lake City, Utah. Their runs were relatively consistent, at 43.330 seconds and 43.354 seconds, but they would still trail their countrymen Tobias and Markus Schiegl. By the following, season, however, the Lingers challenged the Schiegls as the best doubles luge team in Austria, beating the latter at the inaugural Krombacher Challenge Cup and setting a course record there.

=== 2005 crash and injury ===
Linger was injured when he and his brother crashed in an Olympic test run in 2005. The track had a reputation for being fast, and the accident occurred on the 17th of 19 turns. He fractured the ankle and fibula in his left leg, and metal pins were inserted to help it heal. Despite this, he later told reporters that while he found the track to be challenging, he liked luging on it.

=== 2006 Winter Olympics ===
Only a year after his injury and with metal pins still inserted in his left leg, Linger and his brother were selected to compete in their second Winter Olympics, the 2006 Games in Turin, Italy. The doubles competition there saw crashes by three different teams, one of which resulted in a Ukrainian competitor being taken to a hospital in an ambulance. As a result, the event was described in the media as being 'plagued' by crashes. The Lingers managed to win the gold medal, defeating defending 2002 champions André Florschütz and Torsten Wustlich of Germany.

=== 2010 Winter Olympics ===
The Linger brothers entered the 2010 Winter Olympics in Vancouver, Canada defending their 2006 gold medal and as strong favorites to be medal contenders. Controversy surrounded the luge competitions at the 2010 Games following the death of Georgian luger Nodar Kumaritashvili in a crash during a training run prior to the opening of the Games. After Kumaritashvili's death, changes were made in the ice profile of the turn where he crashed, padding was added to support columns like the one he hit, and the start of the doubles competition was moved up to what had previously been the junior start. This meant that competitors only had six training runs on the altered course in which to develop an entirely new strategy for their runs. After the first run, the Linger brothers led their closest competitors, brothers Andris and Juris Šics of Latvia, by a razor-thin margin of .088 seconds. However, they expanded their lead in the second run, winning the gold medal by a cumulative .264 seconds. Their victory prevented the German team at the Games from sweeping all three luge medals, as German competitors had previously won both the men's and women's singles events.

=== 2014 Winter Olympics ===
The Linger brothers were unable to make it a hat-trick of golds at the 2014 Winter Olympics in Sochi, finishing second to the German duo of Tobias Wendl and Tobias Arlt, whose lead of .522 seconds over the Lingers was the largest winning margin in the history of the Olympic doubles competition. However the silver medal made them the second most successful pairing in Olympic doubles luge, behind Stefan Krauße and Jan Behrendt. Less than six weeks later the Linger brothers announced their retirement from the sport.

== Personal life ==
Linger lives in Absam, Austria, and serves in the Austrian army.
