= Andreas Linger =

Austrian luger (born 1981)

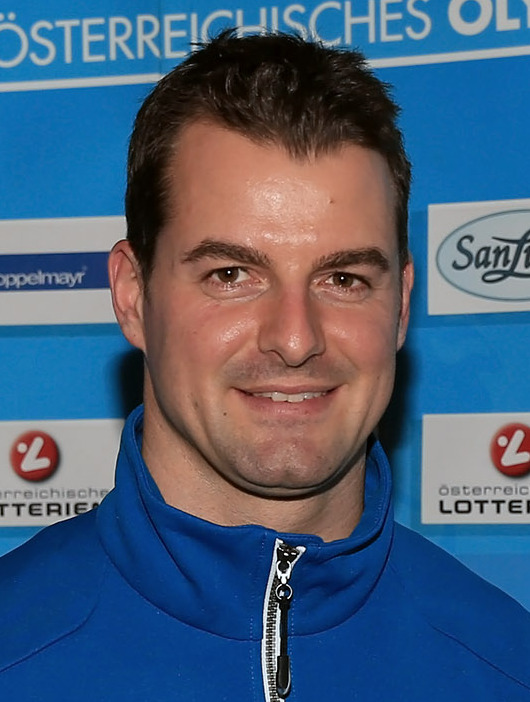
- Linger in 2014

Medal record

Men's luge

Representing Austria

Olympic Games
| Gold medal – first place | 2006 Turin | Men's doubles |
| Gold medal – first place | 2010 Vancouver | Men's doubles |
| Silver medal – second place | 2014 Sochi | Men's doubles |

World Championships
| Gold medal – first place | 2003 Sigulda | Men's doubles |
| Gold medal – first place | 2011 Cesana | Men's doubles |
| Gold medal – first place | 2012 Altenberg | Men's doubles |
| Bronze medal – third place | 2003 Sigulda | Mixed team |
| Bronze medal – third place | 2013 Whistler | Men's doubles |

World Cup Championships
| Gold medal – first place | 2011–12 | Men's doubles |
| Silver medal – second place | 2010–11 | Men's doubles |
| Bronze medal – third place | 2004–05 | Men's doubles |
| Bronze medal – third place | 2007–08 | Men's doubles |
| Bronze medal – third place | 2008–09 | Men's doubles |

European Championships
| Gold medal – first place | 2010 Sigulda | Men's doubles |
| Silver medal – second place | 2008 Cesana | Men's doubles |
| Silver medal – second place | 2008 Cesana | Mixed team |
| Silver medal – second place | 2010 Sigulda | Mixed team |
| Bronze medal – third place | 2004 Oberhof | Men's doubles |
| Bronze medal – third place | 2004 Oberhof | Mixed team |
| Bronze medal – third place | 2014 Sigulda | Men's doubles |

Andreas Linger (born 31 May 1981 in Hall in Tirol) is an Austrian former luger who competed internationally since 2000. He and his younger brother Wolfgang began luging at a very young age, and did their first doubles run when they were 14. Linger has won five medals at the FIL World Luge Championships with three golds (Men's doubles: 2003, 2011 and 2012) and two bronzes (Mixed team: 2003 and men's doubles: 2013). He also earned seven medals at the FIL European Luge Championships with a gold (Men's doubles: 2010), three silvers (Men's doubles: 2008, Mixed team: 2008, 2010), and three bronzes (Men's doubles: 2004 and 2014, Mixed team: 2004). The Lingers were overall Luge World Cup men's doubles champions in 2011-12 and scored 15 World Cup race victories. They were two time Olympic champions in the men's doubles event at the 2006 Winter Olympics in Turin, Italy and the 2010 Winter Olympics in Vancouver, British Columbia, Canada. They won in 2006 despite Wolfgang having broken his leg in a luge crash the previous year. In 2010, they successfully defended their gold medal against another team of brothers, Andris and Juris Šics of Latvia.

== Athletic career ==
=== Introduction to luge ===
Andreas competed in a number of sports as a child, including skiing and soccer. He was ten years old when he tried an artificial Iuge track for the first time, on a track that had been used for Olympic events in 1964 and 1976. His brother was one of the few other members of their local luge club who tried it. Even at that young age, Andreas did not think of Iuge as being a particularly dangerous sport. Five years later, when they were both 14, they were allowed to try doubles Iuge for the first time. Despite competing as individuals or in mixed doubles in some events, the Wolfgang and Andreas have seen their most significant success as a doubles team.

=== 2002–2004 ===
The Linger brothers placed 8th in the 2002 Winter Olympics in Salt Lake City, Utah. Their runs were relatively consistent, at 43.330 seconds and 43.354 seconds, but they would still trail their countrymen Tobias and Markus Schiegl. By the following, season, however, the Lingers challenged the Schiegls as the best doubles luge team in Austria, beating the latter at the inaugural Krombacher Challenge Cup and setting a course record there.

=== 2006 Winter Olympics ===
Linger's brother Wolfgang was injured when he and his brother crashed in an Olympic test run in 2005, breaking the ankle and fibula in Wolfgang's left leg. Only a year after the crash, Linger and his brother competed in their second Winter Olympics, the 2006 Games in Turin, Italy. The doubles competition there saw crashes by three different teams, one of which resulted in a Ukrainian competitor being taken to a hospital in an ambulance. As a result, the event was described in the media as being 'plagued' by crashes. The Lingers managed to win the gold medal, defeating defending 2002 champions André Florschütz and Torsten Wustlich of Germany.

=== 2010 Winter Olympics ===
The Linger brothers entered the 2010 Winter Olympics in Vancouver, British Columbia, Canada defending their 2006 gold medal and as strong favorites to be medal contenders. Controversy surrounded the luge competitions at the 2010 Games following the death of Georgian luger Nodar Kumaritashvili in a crash during a training run prior to the opening of the Games. After Kumaritashvili's death, changes were made in the ice profile of the turn where he crashed, padding was added to support columns like the one he hit, and the start of the doubles competition was moved up to what had previously been the junior start. This meant that competitors only had six training runs on the altered course in which to develop an entirely new strategy for their runs. After the first run, the Linger brothers led their closest competitors, brothers Andris and Juris Šics of Latvia, by a razor-thin margin of .088 seconds. However, they expanded their lead in the second run, winning the gold medal by a cumulative .264 seconds. Their victory prevented the German team at the Games from sweeping all three luge medals, as German competitors had previously won both the men's and women's singles events. Linger told reporters after the victory that it had been more difficult than the medal in Turin four years earlier, given the pressure of being defending champions and the favorite to win.

=== 2014 Winter Olympics ===
The Linger brothers were unable to make it a hat-trick of golds at the 2014 Winter Olympics in Sochi, finishing second to the German duo of Tobias Wendl and Tobias Arlt, whose lead of .522 seconds over the Lingers was the largest winning margin in the history of the Olympic doubles competition. However the silver medal made them the second most successful pairing in Olympic doubles luge, behind Stefan Krauße and Jan Behrendt. Less than six weeks later the Linger brothers announced their retirement from the sport.

== Personal life ==
Linger lives in Absam, Austria, and serves in the Austrian army.
