= Clay Ives =

Canadian-American luger (born 1972)

Medal record

Luge

Representing the United States

Olympic Games
Bronze medal – third place	2002 Salt Lake City	Men's doubles

James "Clay" Ives (born September 5, 1972) is a Canadian-born American luger who competed from the early 1990s until his 2002 retirement. Competing in three Winter Olympics (the first two with Canada, the last with the United States), he won the bronze medal in the men's doubles event at the 2002 Winter Olympics in Salt Lake City.

He was born in Bancroft, Ontario.
