= Eugen Radu =

Romanian luger (born 1978)

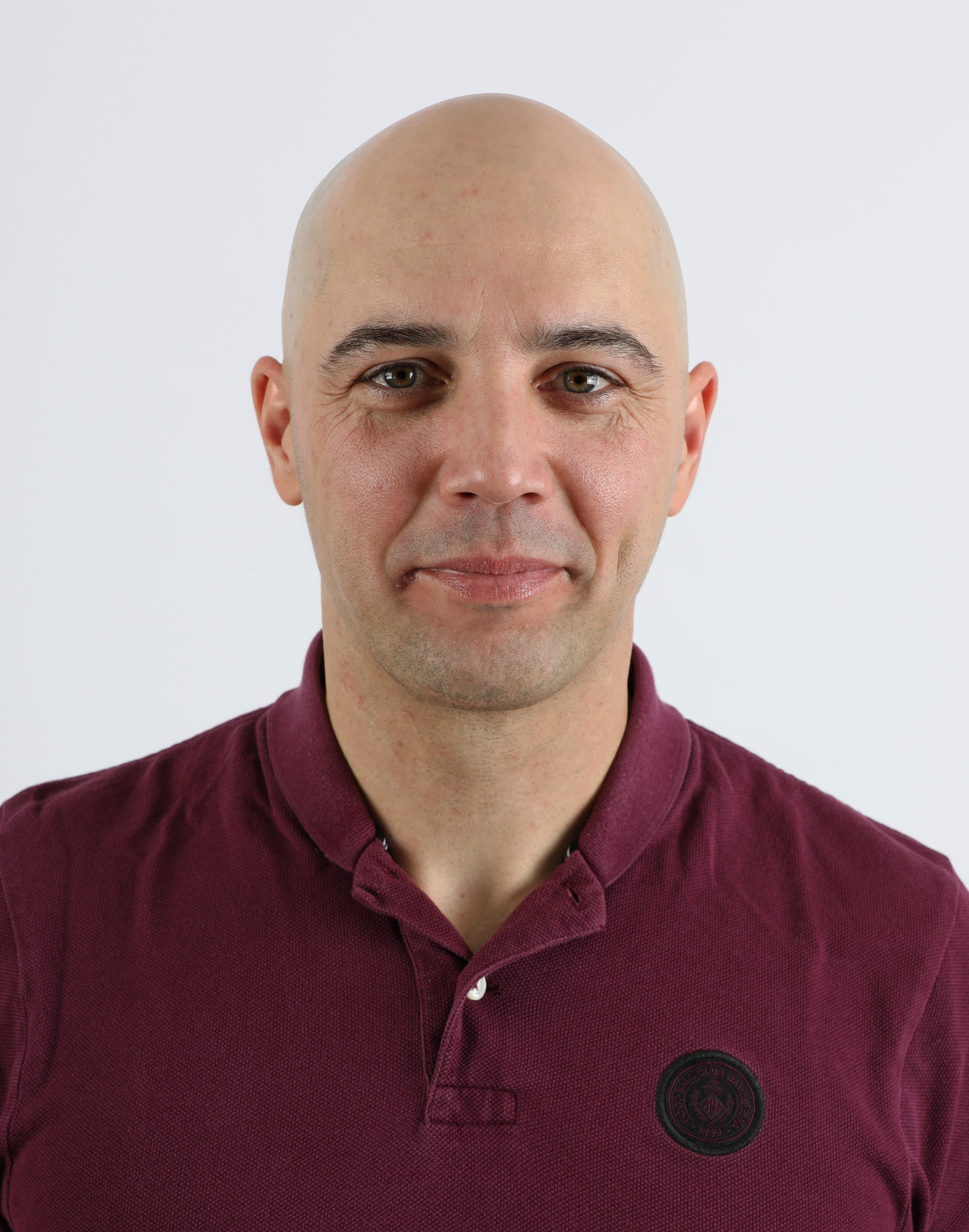
- Radu in 2018

Personal information
- Full name: Eugen Teodor Radu
- Born: 16 April 1978 (age 48) Tulcea, Romania

Sport
- Country: Romania
- Sport: Luge

Eugen Teodor Radu (born 16 April 1978) (Note: other sources report his date of birth as 10 April 1978) is a Romanian luger who has competed since 1994. He was born in Tulcea.

Competing in two Winter Olympics, he earned his best finish of 15th in the men's doubles event both in 2002 and 2006. Radu's best finish at the FIL World Luge Championships was 14th in the men's doubles event at Nagano in 2004.
