= Eric Pothier =

Canadian luger (born 1979)

Personal information
- Full name: Adam Eric Pothier
- Born: August 3, 1979 (age 47) Calgary, Alberta, Canada

Sport
- Country: Canada
- Sport: Luge

Adam Eric Pothier (born August 3, 1979, in Calgary, Alberta) is a Canadian luger who has competed since 1990. Competing in two Winter Olympics, he earned his best finish of fifth in the men's doubles event at Salt Lake City in 2002. He is a 6 time National Champion in the Doubles category. Pothier officially retired from the sport in January 2009.

Pothier's best finish in the FIL World Luge Championships was ninth in the men's doubles event at Nagano in 2004. He resides in Airdrie, Alberta and studied at the University of Calgary. Graduated in June 2013 with a Bachelor of Arts in Economics and a minor in Business.

Best Results:
10th 2000 FIL Luge World Championships St. Moritz, Switzerland. Doubles
4th World Cup Calgary, Canada 2001. Doubles
2nd Challenge Cup Calgary, Canada 2001. Doubles
5th 2002 Winter Olympic Games Salt Lake City, USA. Doubles
4th World Cup Salt Lake City, USA 2002. Doubles
4th World Cup Calgary 2002. Doubles
3rd World Cup Overall 02/03. Combined
7th World Cup Overall 02/03. Doubles
20th World Cup Igls, Austria. Singles
9th 2004 FIL Luge World Championships Nagano, Japan. Doubles

10th 2006 Winter Olympic Games Torino, Italy. Doubles
