= Oswald Haselrieder =

Italian luger (born 1971)

Medal record

Men's luge

Representing Italy

Olympic Games
Bronze medal – third place	2006 Turin	Men's doubles

World Championships
Gold medal – first place	2009 Lake Placid	Men's doubles
Bronze medal – third place	1996 Altenberg	Men's doubles
Bronze medal – third place	1996 Altenberg	Mixed team
Bronze medal – third place	1997 Igls	Mixed team

World Cup Championships
Silver medal – second place	1996–97	Men's doubles
Bronze medal – third place	1997–98	Men's doubles
Bronze medal – third place	2006–07	Men's doubles

European Championships
Silver medal – second place	1996 Sigulda	Men's doubles
Bronze medal – third place	1992 Winterberg	Mixed team
Bronze medal – third place	1996 Sigulda	Mixed team
Bronze medal – third place	2000 Winterberg	Mixed team
Bronze medal – third place	2002 Altenberg	Men's doubles
Bronze medal – third place	2008 Cesana	Men's doubles
Bronze medal – third place	2008 Cesana	Mixed team

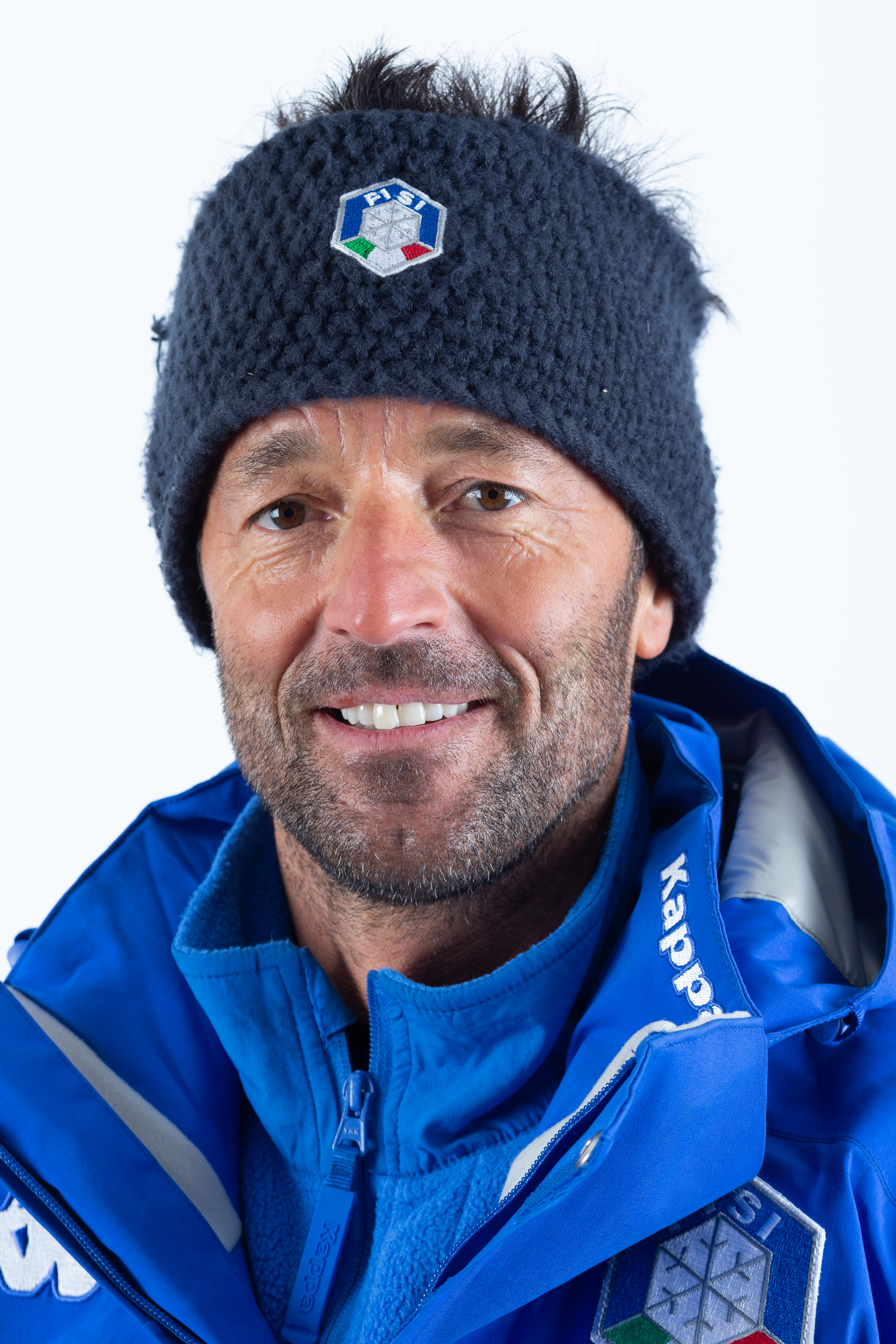
Haselrieder in 2018

Oswald Haselrieder OMRI (born 22 August 1971 in Völs am Schlern, South Tyrol) is an Italian former luger who competed internationally from 1988 to 2010. He achieved success at junior level, taking two bronze medals in singles and a gold in doubles at the World Junior Championships, the latter achieved in partnership with Dietmar Pierhofer. Haselrider and Pierhofer continued to compete together until 1995, when they split up and Haselrieder joined forces with Gerhard Plankensteiner. Haselrieder went on to win the bronze medal in the men's doubles event at the 2006 Winter Olympics in Turin after competing in three previous Winter Olympic Games: in 1992 in the singles event and in doubles in 1998 and 2002. He went on to compete in a fifth Olympics in 2010: he retired soon afterwards after sustaining an injury in training in March of that year.

Haselrieder also won four medals at the FIL World Luge Championships with one gold (Men's doubles: 2009) and three bronzes (Men's doubles: 1996, Mixed team: 1996, 1997). At the FIL European Luge Championships, he won seven medals with one silver (Men's doubles: 1996) and six bronzes (Men's doubles: 2002, 2008 (tied with Germany); Mixed team: 1992, 1996, 2000, 2008). He also won four Italian national titles in doubles.

Haselrieder's best overall Luge World Cup finish was second in men's doubles in 1996-7. He took a total of five World Cup race wins in doubles competition.

He was made a knight of the Order of Merit of the Italian Republic in 2006. After his retirement, he became a member of technical staff for the Italian national luge team.

His wife, Doris, competed as a natural track luger for Italy in the early to mid-1990s.
