= Taras Senkiv (luger) =

Ukrainian luger (born 1989)

Taras Senkiv (born 23 June 1989) is a Ukrainian luger who has competed since 2005. His best Luge World Cup finish was 17th in men's doubles at Calgary on 21 November 2009.

Senkiv qualified for the 2010 Winter Olympics where he finished 19th.
