= Grant Albrecht =

Canadian luger (born 1981)

Grant Albrecht (born January 29, 1981) is a Canadian luger who has competed since 1998. Competing in two Winter Olympics, he earned his best finish of tenth in the men's doubles event at Turin in 2006.

Albrecht's best finish at the FIL World Luge Championships was ninth in the men's doubles event at Nagano in 2004.

After his competition career Albrecht has worked as a luge coach, coaching the Australian national team at the 2010 Winter Olympics in Vancouver and subsequently coaching the Norwegian national team before being appointed as Alberta Development Coach by the Canadian Luge Association in August 2011.
