= Steffen Wöller =

German luger (born 1972)

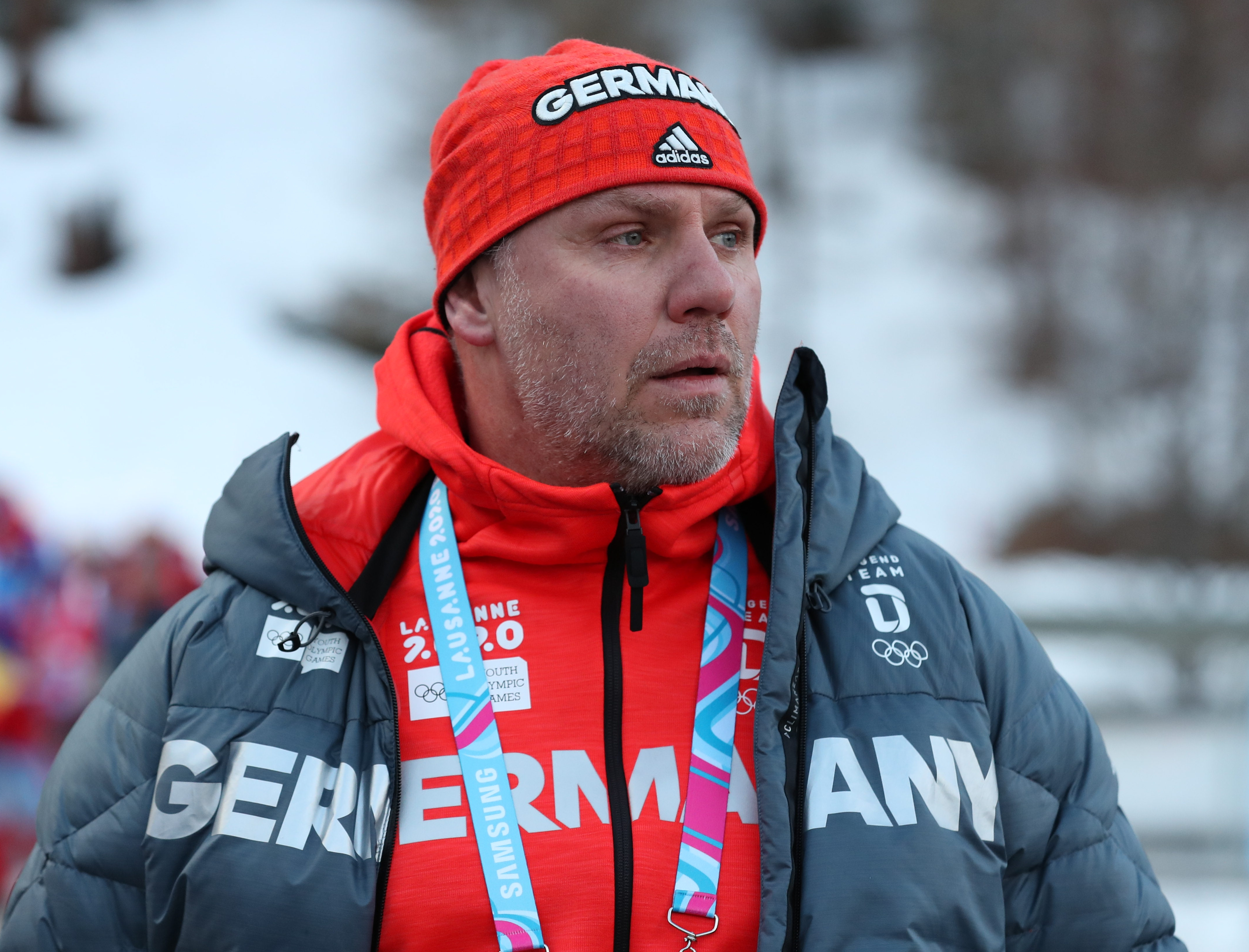
- Steffen Wöller at the 2020 Winter Youth Olympics

Medal record

Men's luge

Representing Germany

World Championships
Gold medal – first place	2000 St. Moritz	Mixed team
Silver medal – second place	2000 St. Moritz	Men's doubles
Silver medal – second place	2001 Calgary	Men's doubles
Silver medal – second place	2001 Calgary	Mixed team
Bronze medal – third place	1997 Igls	Men's doubles

World Cup Championships
Gold medal – first place	2000–01	Men's doubles
Silver medal – second place	1999–00	Men's doubles
Silver medal – second place	2001–02	Men's doubles
Bronze medal – third place	1993–94	Men's doubles

European Championships
Gold medal – first place	2002 Altenberg	Mixed team
Gold medal – first place	2004 Oberhof	Men's doubles
Gold medal – first place	2004 Oberhof	Mixed team
Silver medal – second place	1998 Oberhof	Men's doubles
Silver medal – second place	2000 Winterberg	Men's doubles
Silver medal – second place	2000 Winterberg	Mixed team

Steffen Wöller (born 10 September 1972 in Erfurt, Thuringia) is a German luger who competed from 1991 to 2004. He won five medals at the FIL World Luge Championships with one gold (Mixed team: 2000), three silvers (Men's doubles: 2000, 2001; Mixed team: 2001), and one bronze (Men's doubles: 1997).

Wöller also won six medals at the FIL European Luge Championships with three golds (Mixed team: 2002, 2004, 2006) and three silvers (Men's doubles: 1998, 2000; Mixed team: 2000).

He won the overall Luge World Cup title in men's doubles in 2000–1.

Wöller's best finish at the Winter Olympics was fourth in the men's doubles event at Salt Lake City in 2002.

== Sources ==
- "Steffen Wöller". FIL-Luge.org. Archived from the original on 2014-12-17.
- Hickok sports information on World champions in luge and skeleton.
- List of European luge champions (in German)
- List of men's doubles luge World Cup champions since 1978.
