= FIL World Luge Championships 2007 =

Official logo of the FIL World Luge Championships 2007

The FIL World Luge Championships 2007 took place February 2-4, 2007 at the bobsleigh, luge, and skeleton track in Igls, Austria for the fourth time after having hosted the event in 1977, 1987, and 1997.

== Men's singles ==
Medal	Athlete	Time
Gold	David Möller (GER)	1:38.052
Silver	Armin Zöggeler (ITA)	+0.007
Bronze	Jan Eichhorn (GER)	+0.111

== Women's singles ==
Medal	Athlete	Time
Gold	Tatjana Hüfner (GER)	1:19.808
Silver	Anke Wischnewski (GER)	+0.140
Bronze	Silke Kraushaar-Pielach (GER)	+0.172

Hüfner followed her Winter Olympic bronze medal at Turin with a gold at this championship event.

== Men's doubles ==
Medal	Athlete	Time
Gold	Germany (Patric Leitner, Alexander Resch)	1:19.285
Silver	Austria (Tobias Schiegl, Markus Schiegl)	+0.116
Bronze	United States (Mark Grimmette, Brian Martin)	+0.215

Grimette and Martin of the United States won their third straight bronze medal in this event at the World Championships while Leitner and Resch won their sixth overall medal in this event in the championships, including their fourth gold. Scheigl and Schiegl also won their sixth overall medal in this event.

== Mixed team ==
Medal	Athlete	Time
Gold	Germany (David Möller, Silke Kraushaar-Pielach, Patric Leitner, Alexander Resch)	2:09.159
Silver	Italy (Armin Zöggeler, Sandra Gasparini, Christian Oberstolz, Patrick Gruber)	+0.682
Bronze	Austria (Daniel Pfister, Nina Reithmeyer, Peter Penz, Georg Fischler)	+0.823

== Medal table ==
Rank	Nation	Gold	Silver	Bronze	Total
1	Germany (GER)	4	1	2	7
2	Italy (ITA)	0	2	0	2
3	Austria (AUT)	0	1	1	2
4	United States (USA)	0	0	1	1
Totals (4 entries)		4	4	4	12
