= Brian Martin (luger) =

American luger (born 1974)

Personal information
- Born: January 19, 1974 (age 52) Palo Alto, California, U.S.
Medal record
Luge
Representing United States
Olympic Games
Silver medal – second place	2002 Salt Lake City	Men's doubles
Bronze medal – third place	1998 Nagano	Men's doubles
World Championships
Silver medal – second place	2004 Nagano	Mixed team
Silver medal – second place	2005 Park City	Mixed team
Bronze medal – third place	1999 Königssee	Men's doubles
Bronze medal – third place	2000 St. Moritz	Men's doubles
Bronze medal – third place	2001 Calgary	Mixed team
Bronze medal – third place	2004 Nagano	Men's doubles
Bronze medal – third place	2005 Park City	Men's doubles
Bronze medal – third place	2007 Igls	Men's doubles
Bronze medal – third place	2009 Lake Placid	Men's doubles

Brian Martin (born January 19, 1974) is an American luger who competed from 1990 to 2010. Competing in four Winter Olympics, he won two medals in the men's doubles event with a silver in 2002 and a bronze in 1998. He was born in Palo Alto, California.

Martin also won nine medals at the FIL World Luge Championships with two silvers (Mixed team: 2004, 2005) and seven bronzes (Men's doubles: 1999, 2000, 2004, 2005, 2007, 2009; Mixed team: 2001).

Martin won the overall Luge World Cup men's doubles title three times (1997–98, 1998–99, 2002–03).

He announced his retirement on 17 March 2010.

Martin graduated from the University of California, Berkeley in 2014.
