= Mark Grimmette =

American luger (born 1971)

Personal information
- Born: January 23, 1971 (age 55) Ann Arbor, Michigan, U.S.
Medal record
Luge
Representing United States
Olympic Games
Silver medal – second place	2002 Salt Lake City	Men's doubles
Bronze medal – third place	1998 Nagano	Men's doubles
World Championships
Silver medal – second place	2004 Nagano	Mixed team
Silver medal – second place	2005 Park City	Mixed team
Bronze medal – third place	1999 Königssee	Men's doubles
Bronze medal – third place	2000 St. Moritz	Men's doubles
Bronze medal – third place	2001 Calgary	Mixed team
Bronze medal – third place	2004 Nagano	Men's doubles
Bronze medal – third place	2005 Park City	Men's doubles
Bronze medal – third place	2007 Igls	Men's doubles
Bronze medal – third place	2009 Lake Placid	Men's doubles

Mark Grimmette (born January 23, 1971) is an American luger who competed from 1990 to 2010. Competing in five Winter Olympics, he won two medals in the men's doubles event with a silver in 2002 and a bronze in 1998. He was born in Ann Arbor, Michigan.

Grimmette also won nine medals at the FIL World Luge Championships with two silvers (Mixed team: 2004, 2005) and seven bronzes (Men's doubles: 1999, 2000, 2004, 2005, 2007, 2009; Mixed team: 2001). He won the overall Luge World Cup men's doubles title three times (1997–1998, 1998–1999, 2002–2003). He was selected in December 2009 to compete in the 2010 Winter Olympics.

Grimmette carried the United States flag during the opening ceremony of the 2010 Winter Olympics in Vancouver.

He announced his retirement on March 17, 2010.

On April 29, 2010, it was announced that Grimmette was named USA Luge's Sports Program Director and also was involved as a head coach.

== Personal life ==
Mark Grimmette lived in Muskegon, Michigan, and graduated from Reeths-Puffer High School originally, but moved to Lake Placid, New York, after being named to his current position. He lives there with his wife Keela, founder of Reason 2 Smile. Grimmette and his wife Keela have three children.

A biography of Mark Grimmette is 9.8 Meters Per Second Per Second by Jean E. Van Lente.

Grimmette attended the University of Denver in the early 1990s.

Olympic Games
Preceded by Lopez Lomong	Flagbearer for United States; Vancouver 2010	Succeeded by Mariel Zagunis
