= Patric Leitner =

German luger (born 1977)

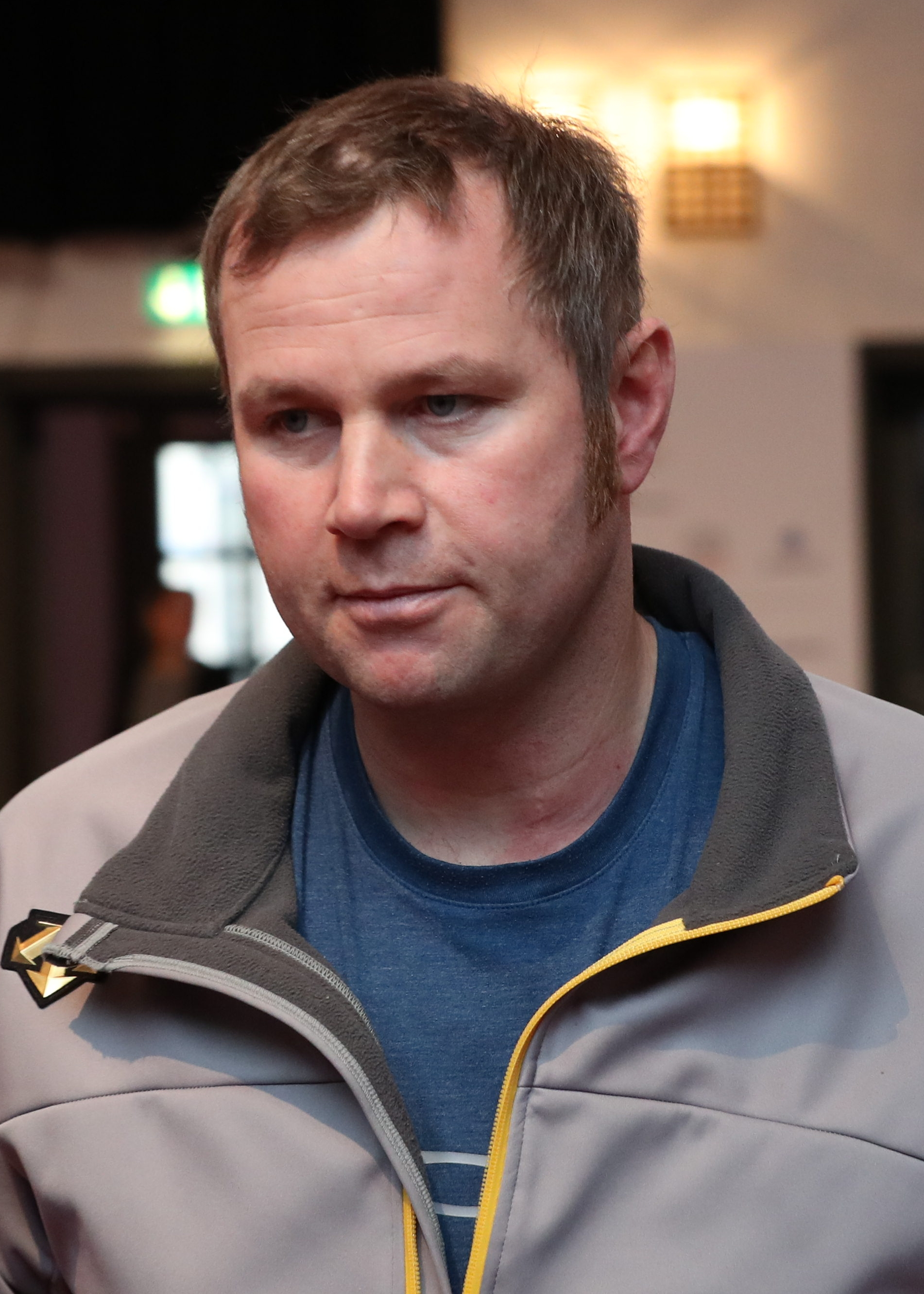
- Leitner in 2018

Medal record

Men's Luge

Representing Germany

Olympic Games
Gold medal – first place	2002 Salt Lake City	Men's doubles
Bronze medal – third place	2010 Vancouver	Men's doubles

World Championships
Gold medal – first place	1999 Königssee	Men's doubles
Gold medal – first place	2000 St. Moritz	Men's doubles
Gold medal – first place	2001 Calgary	Mixed team
Gold medal – first place	2003 Sigulda	Mixed team
Gold medal – first place	2004 Nagano	Men's doubles
Gold medal – first place	2004 Nagano	Mixed team
Gold medal – first place	2007 Igls	Men's doubles
Gold medal – first place	2007 Igls	Mixed team
Silver medal – second place	2000 St. Moritz	Mixed team
Silver medal – second place	2005 Park City	Men's doubles
Bronze medal – third place	1999 Königssee	Mixed team
Bronze medal – third place	2003 Sigulda	Men's doubles

World Cup Championships
Gold medal – first place	1999-00	Men's doubles
Gold medal – first place	2001-02	Men's doubles
Gold medal – first place	2003-04	Men's doubles
Gold medal – first place	2005-06	Men's doubles
Gold medal – first place	2006–07	Men's doubles
Gold medal – first place	2007-08	Men's doubles
Silver medal – second place	2002-03	Men's doubles
Silver medal – second place	2008-09	Men's doubles
Silver medal – second place	2009–10	Men's doubles
Bronze medal – third place	1998-99	Men's singles
Bronze medal – third place	2000-01	Men's singles

European Championships
Gold medal – first place	2000 Winterberg	Men's doubles
Gold medal – first place	2000 Winterberg	Mixed team
Gold medal – first place	2002 Altenberg	Men's doubles
Gold medal – first place	2006 Winterberg	Men's doubles
Gold medal – first place	2006 Winterberg	Mixed team
Silver medal – second place	2002 Altenberg	Mixed team
Bronze medal – third place	2008 Cesana	Men's doubles

Patric-Fritz Leitner (born 23 February 1977 in Berchtesgaden, Bavaria) is a German former luger who competed from 1998 to 2010. Together with Alexander Resch he won the men's doubles event at the 2002 Winter Olympics in Salt Lake City. They also competed at the 2006 Winter Olympics, finishing sixth. At the 2010 Winter Olympics in Vancouver, they won bronze in their last race.

In addition they won a dozen medals at the FIL World Luge Championships, including eight golds (Men's doubles:1999, 2000, 2004, 2007; Mixed team: 2001, 2003, 2004, 2007), two silvers (Men's doubles: 2005, Mixed team: 2000), and two bronzes (Men's doubles: 2003, Mixed team 1999). At the FIL European Luge Championships, they also won seven medals with five golds (Men's doubles: 2000, 2002, 2004, 2006; Mixed team: 2000), one silver (Mixed team: 2002), and one bronze (Men's doubles: 2008 (tied with Italy)).

They won the overall Luge World Cup men's doubles title six times (1999-2000, 2001-2, 2003-4, 2005-6, 2006-7, 2007-8).

After retiring from competition, Leitner became involved in luge coaching. He is responsible for a group of German lugers nicknamed the "Sunshine Training Group", alongside Georg Hackl, with Leitner having responsibility for their athletic training. Members of the group include Felix Loch, Natalie Geisenberger, Tobias Wendl and Tobias Arlt, who between them took a clean sweep of the gold medals in luge at the 2014 Winter Olympics.
