= Gerhard Plankensteiner =

Italian luger (born 1971)

Medal record

Men's Luge

Representing Italy

Olympic Games
Bronze medal – third place	2006 Turin	Men's doubles

World Championships
Gold medal – first place	1989 Winterberg	Mixed team
Gold medal – first place	2009 Lake Placid	Men's doubles
Bronze medal – third place	1991 Winterberg	Mixed team
Bronze medal – third place	1996 Altenberg	Men's doubles
Bronze medal – third place	1996 Altenberg	Mixed team
Bronze medal – third place	1997 Igls	Mixed team

World Cup Championships
Silver medal – second place	1996-97	Men's doubles
Bronze medal – third place	1997-98	Men's doubles
Bronze medal – third place	2006–07	Men's doubles

European Championships
Silver medal – second place	1996 Sigulda	Men's doubles
Bronze medal – third place	1996 Sigulda	Mixed team
Bronze medal – third place	2000 Winterberg	Mixed team
Bronze medal – third place	2002 Altenberg	Men's doubles
Bronze medal – third place	2008 Cesana	Men's doubles
Bronze medal – third place	2008 Cesana	Mixed team

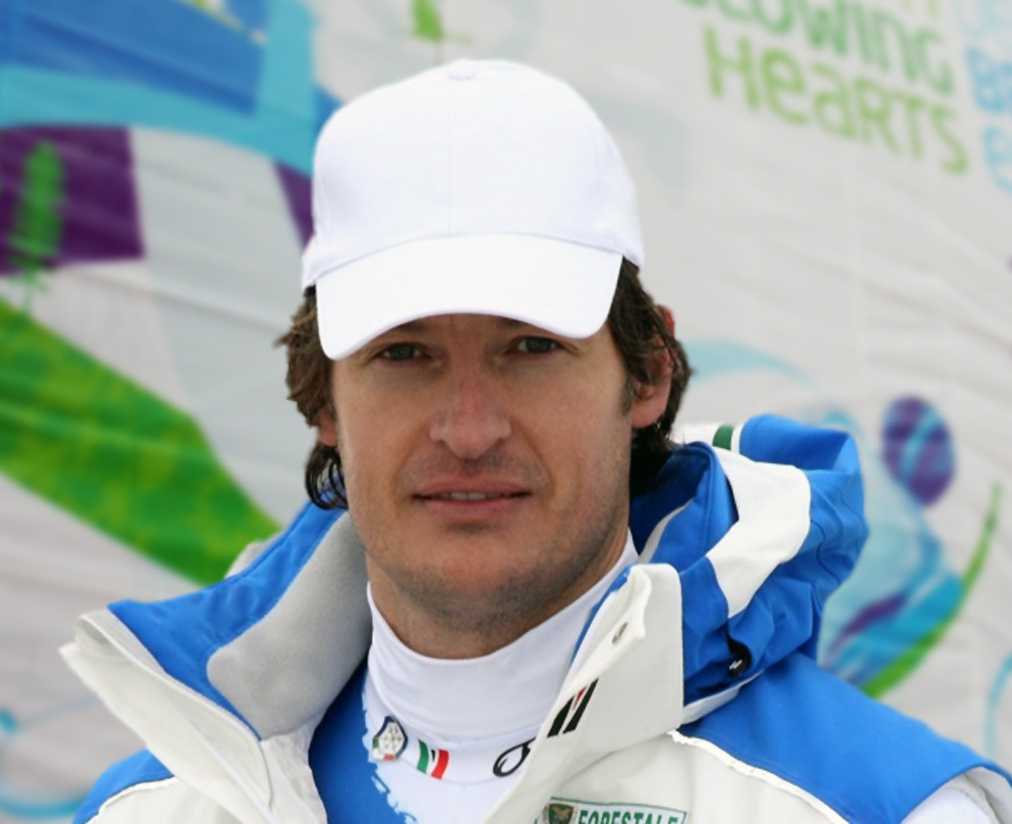
Plankensteiner at the Olympia 2010

Gerhard Plankensteiner (born 8 April 1971 in Sterzing, South Tyrol) is an Italian former luger who competed from 1986 to 2010. Together with Oswald Haselrieder he won the bronze medal in the men's doubles event at the 2006 Winter Olympics in Turin.

Plankensteiner also won six medals at the FIL World Luge Championships with two golds (Men's doubles: 2009, Mixed team: 1989) and four bronzes (Men's doubles: 1996, Mixed team: 1991, 1996, 1997). At the FIL European Luge Championships, he won six medals with one silver (Men's doubles: 1996) and five bronzes (Men's doubles: 2002, 2008 (tied with Germany); Mixed team: 1996, 2000, 2008).

Plankensteiner's best overall Luge World Cup finish was second in men's doubles in 1996-97.
