= Tobias Schiegl =

Austrian luger (born 1973)

Medal record

Men's luge

Representing Austria

World Championships
Gold medal – first place	1996 Altenberg	Men's doubles
Gold medal – first place	1996 Altenberg	Mixed team
Gold medal – first place	1997 Igls	Men's doubles
Gold medal – first place	1997 Igls	Mixed team
Gold medal – first place	1999 Königssee	Mixed team
Silver medal – second place	1993 Calgary	Mixed team
Silver medal – second place	1999 Königssee	Men's doubles
Silver medal – second place	2003 Sigulda	Men's doubles
Silver medal – second place	2007 Igls	Men's doubles
Silver medal – second place	2008 Oberhof	Mixed team
Bronze medal – third place	1995 Lillehammer	Mixed team
Bronze medal – third place	2000 St. Moritz	Mixed team
Bronze medal – third place	2001 Calgary	Men's doubles
Bronze medal – third place	2008 Oberhof	Men's doubles

European Championships
Silver medal – second place	1996 Sigulda	Mixed team
Silver medal – second place	2002 Altenberg	Men's doubles
Bronze medal – third place	1994 Königssee	Mixed team
Bronze medal – third place	1998 Oberhof	Men's doubles
Bronze medal – third place	1998 Oberhof	Mixed team
Bronze medal – third place	2000 Winterberg	Men's doubles
Bronze medal – third place	2002 Altenberg	Mixed team
Bronze medal – third place	2010 Sigulda	Men's doubles

Tobias Schiegl (born 5 October 1973 in Kufstein) is an Austrian former luger who competed from 1993 to 2010. He won fourteen medals at the FIL World Luge Championships with five golds (Men's doubles: 1996, 1997; Mixed team: 1996,1997, 1999), five silvers (Men's doubles: 1999, 2003, 2007; Mixed team: 1993, 2008), and four bronzes (Men's doubles: 2001, 2008; Mixed team: 1995, 2000). He competes in doubles with his older cousin Markus.

Schiegl also won eight medals at the FIL European Luge Championships with two silvers (Men's doubles: 2002; Mixed team: 1996) and six bronzes (Men's doubles: 1998, 2000, 2010; Mixed team: 1994, 1998, 2002).

Competing in five Winter Olympics, his best finish in the men's doubles event was fourth twice (1998 and 2006).

Schiegl's best overall Luge World Cup finish was second in men's doubles twice (1993–94, 1998–99).

After his career as an athlete, Schiegl will become a coach in Austria's Luge Federation.

== Sources ==
- Hickok sports information on World champions in luge and skeleton.
- List of European luge champions (in German)
- List of men's doubles luge World Cup champions since 1978.
- Schiegl/Schiegl erklären Rücktritt at the Fédération Internationale de Luge de Course (12 October 2010 article accessed 19 October 2010.)
