= Participation of women in the Olympics =

Women first participated in the Olympic Games in 1900, and the participation of women in the Olympic Games has been increasing since then. Most disciplines are contested by both sexes, while some disciplines are uniquely for women and some older disciplines remain for men only. Studies of media coverage of the Olympics consistently show differences in the ways in which women and men are described and the ways in which their performances are discussed. As of 2025, 43% of IOC members are women. The 2024 Paris Olympics were the first to have the goal of achieving a perfect 50/50 split between competitors of both genders.

== History of female competitors in the Olympics ==
=== 1900 ===
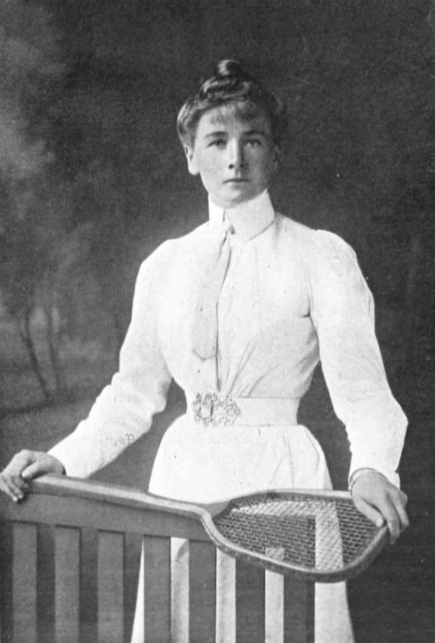
Charlotte Cooper

The first modern Olympic Games to feature female athletes was the 1900 Games in Paris. Hélène de Pourtalès of Switzerland became the first woman to compete at the Olympic Games. She was also the first female Olympic champion as a member of the mixed-gender winning team in the first 1 to 2 ton sailing event on May 22, 1900. Briton Charlotte Cooper became the first female individual champion by winning the women's singles tennis competition on July 11. 22 women competed at the 1900 Summer Olympic Games. Alongside sailing and tennis, women also competed in croquet, equestrian and golf.

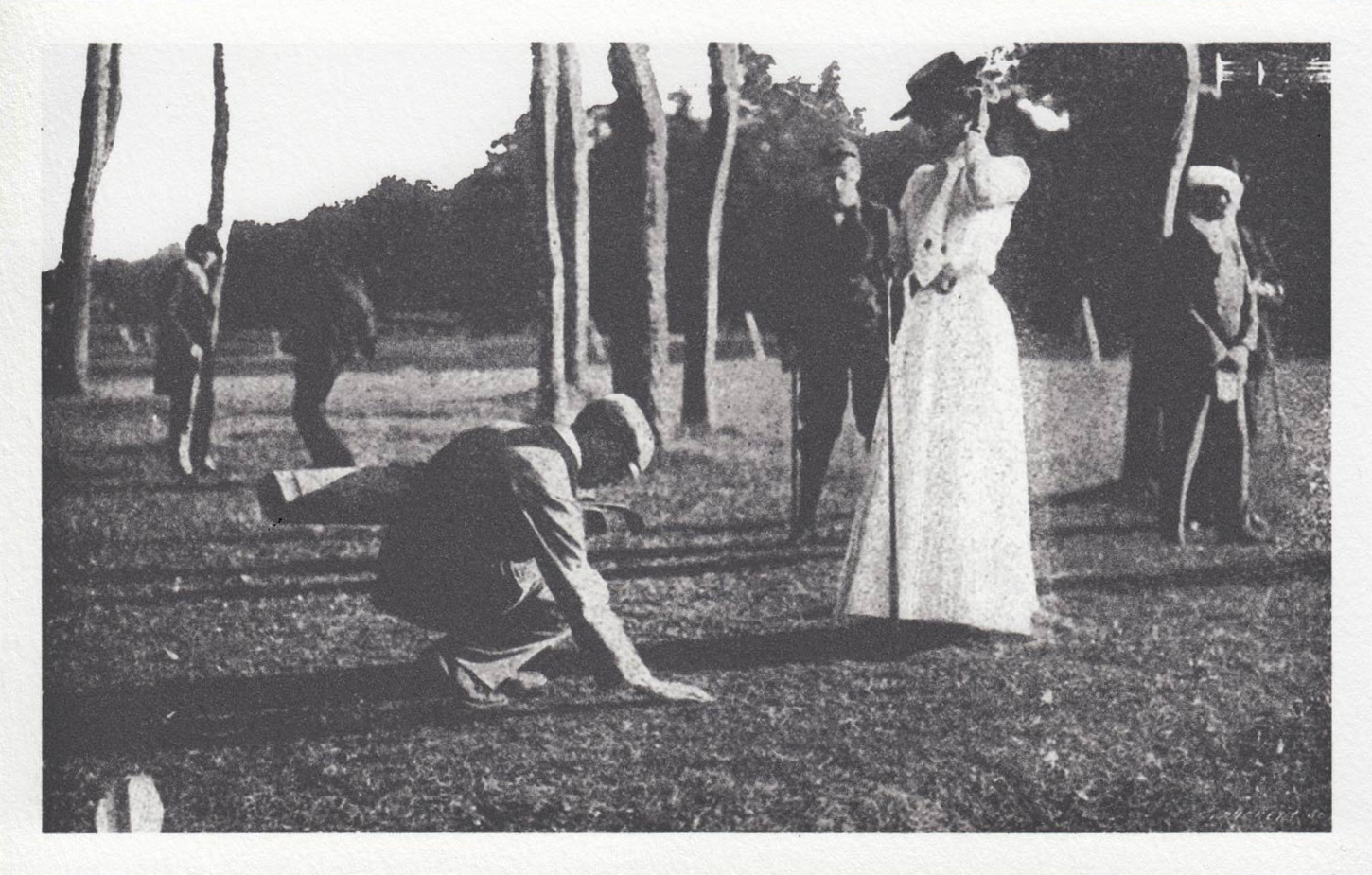
Margaret Abbott plays in the 1900 Olympic Games women's golf event in Compiegne, France.

There were several firsts in the women's golf. The women's division was won by Margaret Abbott of Chicago Golf Club. Abbott shot a 47 to win and became the first ever American woman to win a gold medal in the Olympic Games, though she received a gilded porcelain bowl as a prize instead of a medal. She is also the second overall American woman to receive an Olympic medal. Abbott's mother, Mary Abbott, also competed in this Olympic event and finished tied for seventh, shooting a 65. They were the first and only mother and daughter that have ever competed in the same Olympic event at the same time. Margaret never knew that they were competing in the Olympics; she thought it was a normal golf tournament and died not knowing. Her historic victory was not known until University of Florida professor Paula Welch began to do research into the history of the Olympics and discovered that Margaret Abbott had placed first. Over the course of ten years, she contacted Abbott's children and informed them of their mother's victory.

Jane Moulin and Elvira Guerra competed in the hacks and hunter combined (chevaux de selle) equestrian event at the 1900 Games. Originally only the jumping equestrian events were counted as "Olympic", but IOC records later added the hacks and hunter and mail coach races to the official list of 1900 events, retroactively making Moulin and Guerra among the first female Olympians.

=== 1904–1916 ===
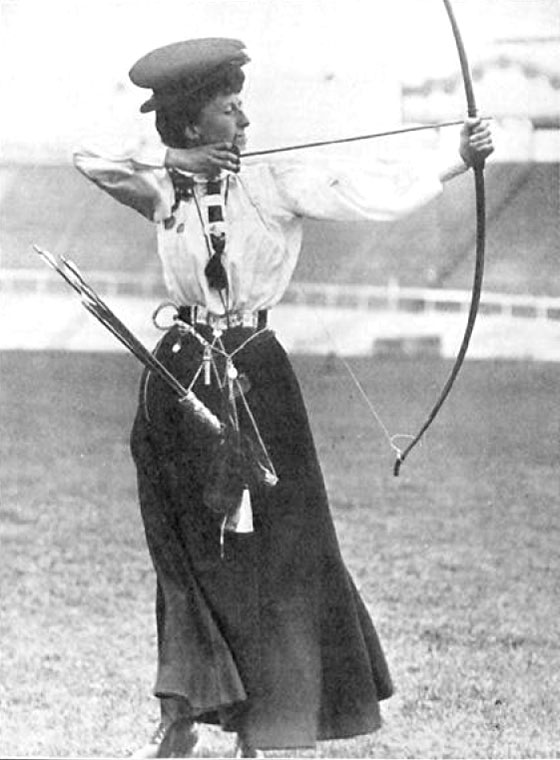
Queenie Newall competed in archery at the 1908 London Games.

In 1904, the women's archery event was added, marking a significant step in including women in Olympic competitions.

By the time of the London 1908 Olympics, there were 37 female athletes who competed in archery, tennis, and figure skating. This represented a growing but still limited participation of women in the Games.

Moving forward to Stockholm 1912, the number of women participating increased to 47 and new disciplines such as swimming and diving were introduced. However, figure skating and archery were removed from the programme for that year. Stockholm 1912 also included art competitions that were open to women, although detailed records of their participation were not consistently kept. The progression in women's participation up to 1912 shows a gradual expansion in both the number of sports and athletes involved, though it was still far from the comprehensive inclusion we see in modern Olympic Games. These early years laid foundational steps for women's sports in the Olympics, reflecting societal shifts towards greater gender equity in athletic competition.

The 1916 Summer Olympics were due to be held in Berlin but were cancelled following the outbreak of World War I.

=== 1920–1928 ===
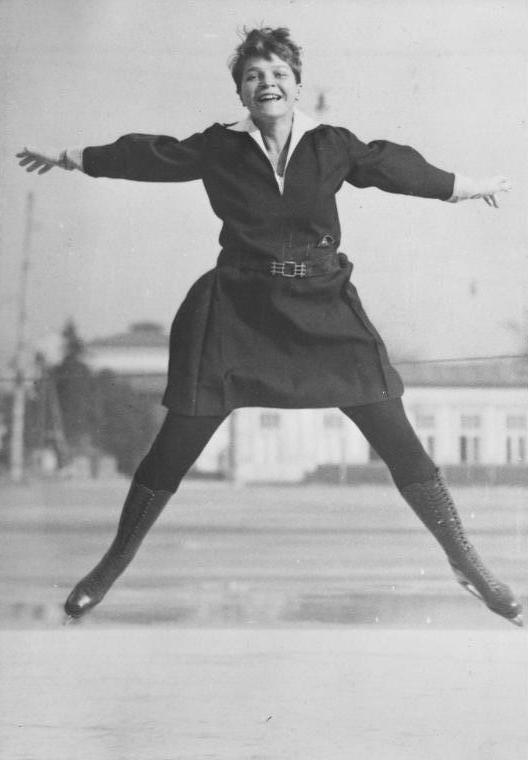
Herma Szabo was an Austrian figure skater who made history as the first woman to win an Olympic gold medal in figure skating 1924.

In 1920, 65 women competed at the Games. Archery was added back into the programme.

In 1924, the first Winter Olympics took place, with women competing only in figure skating. Herma Szabo became the first ever female Winter Olympic champion when she won the ladies' singles competition. A record 135 female athletes competed at the Paris 1924 Summer Olympics. Women's fencing made its debut with Dane Ellen Osiier winning the inaugural gold. Archery was again removed from the programme of sports. Dorothy Margaret Stuart was the first woman to gain a medal in the arts, winning silver in mixed literature.

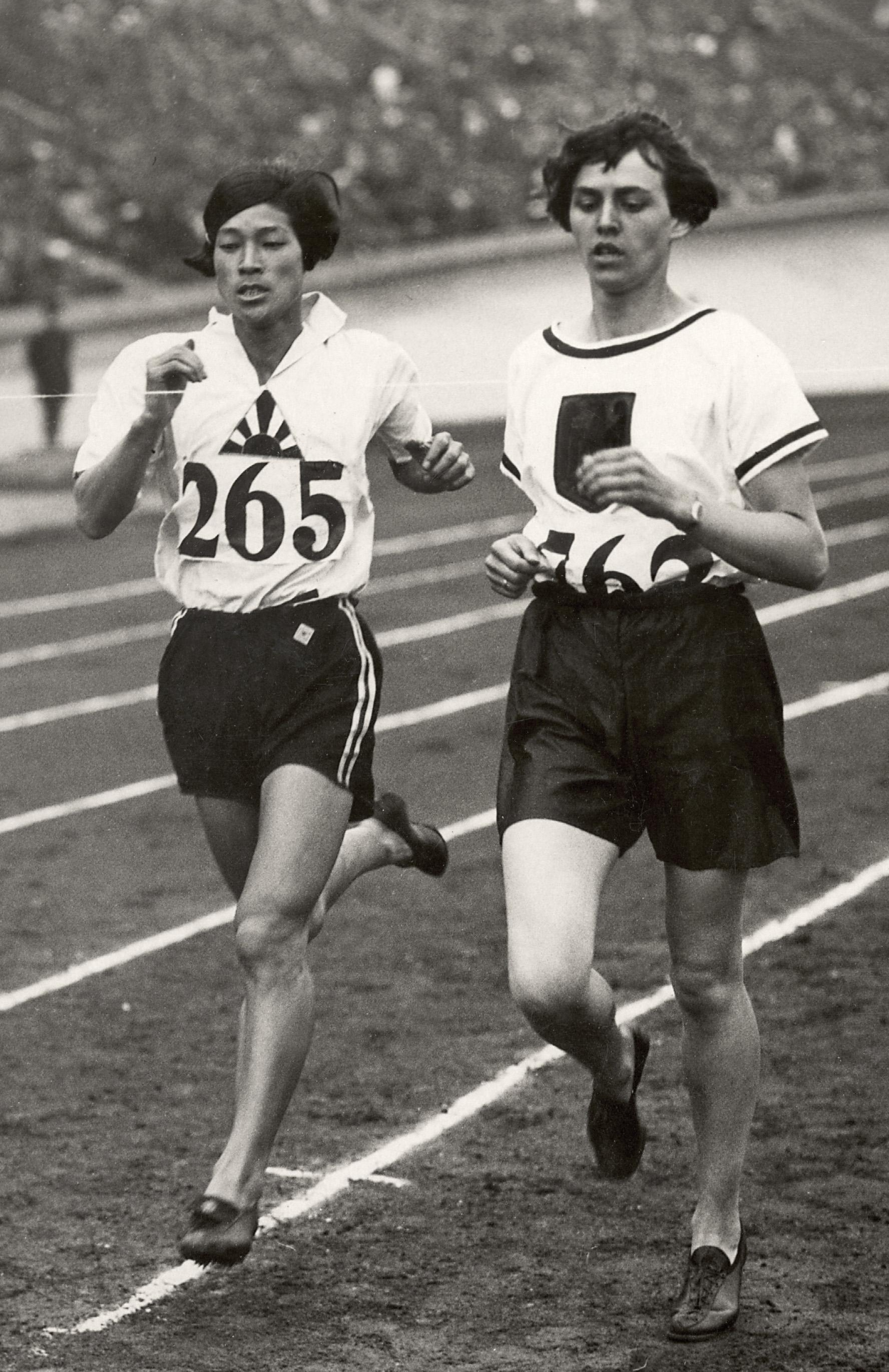
Kinue Hitomi won a silver medal in the Women's 800 meters at the 1928 Amsterdam Olympics. The first woman from Asia to win an Olympic medal.

At the 1928 Winter Olympics in St Moritz, no changes were made to any female events. Fifteen year old Sonja Henie won her inaugural of three Olympic gold medals. This year also marked an increase in women's participation from less than 5% of the total number of athletes in previous years to 10% in 1928. At the Summer Games of the same year, women's athletics and gymnastics made their debut. In athletics, women competed in the 100 metres, 800 metres, 4 × 100 metres relay, high jump and discus throw. The 800-metre race was won by Lina Radke (on the right in the photograph) but was controversial as many competitors were reportedly exhausted or unable to complete the race. Consequently, the IOC decided to drop the 800 metres from the programme; it was not reinstated until 1960. Halina Konopacka of Poland became the first female Olympic champion in athletics by winning the discus throw. At the gymnastics competition, the host Dutch team won the first gold medal for women in the sport. Tennis was removed from the programme.

=== 1932–1936 ===
The 1932 Winter Olympics included three speed skating events for women as a demonstration sport, with no official medals awarded. Women wouldn't be able to compete in full medal events in speed skating until 1960. The 1932 Summer Olympics in Los Angeles debuted the javelin throw and the 80 metres hurdles, which expanded the athletic landscape. A significant highlight was Babe Didrikson Zaharias, an American athlete who won two gold medals in the 80 metres hurdles and javelin and a silver medal in the high jump, drawing considerable attention to women's athletics.

Four years later, at the 1936 Winter Games in Garmisch-Partenkirchen, women competed in the alpine skiing combined event for the first time, with German athlete Christl Cranz securing the inaugural gold medal. The 1936 Summer Olympics in Berlin reintroduced gymnastics to the women's programme.

=== 1940–1944 ===
The 1940 Winter Olympics due to be held in Sapporo, the 1940 Summer Olympics due to be held in Tokyo, the 1944 Winter Olympics due to be held in Cortina d'Ampezzo and the 1944 Summer Olympics due to be held in London were all cancelled due to the outbreak of World War II. Six female Olympic athletes died due to World War II:

Athlete	Nation	Sport	Year of competition	Medal(s)
Estella Agsteribbe	Netherlands	Gymnastics	1928	Gold medal
Dorothea Köring	Germany	Tennis	1912	Gold medal Silver medal
Helena Nordheim	Netherlands	Gymnastics	1928	Gold medal
Anna Dresden-Polak	Netherlands	Gymnastics	1928	Gold medal
Jud Simons	Netherlands	Gymnastics	1928	Gold medal
Hildegarde Švarce	Latvia	Figure Skating	1936	

=== 1948–1956 ===
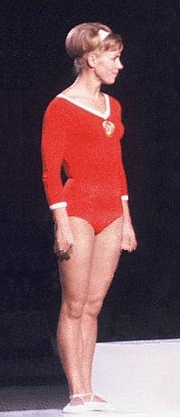
Larisa Latynina during the vault award ceremony at the 1964 Olympics.

At the 1948 Winter Olympics in St. Moritz, women competed in all of the same alpine skiing events as the men for the first time. Women made their debut in the downhill and slalom events, having only competed in the combined event in 1936. Barbara Ann Scott of Canada won the ladies' singles figure skating competition, marking the first time a non-European won the gold medal in the event. Women competed in canoeing for the first time at the London 1948 Summer Olympics, only competing in the K-1 500 metres event. This was the first Summer Olympics since sailing was introduced to not allow women to participate in the sport, provoking pushback from many including Peter Scott, chairman of the British YRA (Yacht Racing Association) Olympic Committee. The decision to ban women sailors would be reversed at the very next Summer Olympics. Alice Coachman won a gold medal in the women's high jump at the 1948 Summer Olympics, marking the first gold medal won by a Black woman for the United States. Dutch athlete Fanny Blankers-Koen (dubbed "the Flying Housewife") won four gold medals at the Games, matching the number of medals Jesse Owens had won twelve years earlier. She also held the world records in the high jump and the long jump but did not compete in those events as the rules prohibited women from competing in more than three individual events at the time.

At the 1952 Winter Olympics held in Oslo, women competed in cross-country skiing for the first time. They competed in the 10 kilometre distance. At the 1952 Summer Olympics held in Helsinki, women were allowed to compete in equestrian for the first time since the hacks and hunter combined event in 1900. They competed in dressage which was open to both men and women competing against one another. Danish equestrian Lis Hartel of Denmark won the silver medal in the individual competition competing alongside men. A women's team portable apparatus event, a precursor to rhythmic gymnastics, was also introduced.

At the 1956 Winter Olympics held in Cortina d'Ampezzo, the 3 × 5 kilometre cross-country relay event was added to the programme. The 1956 Summer Olympics held in Melbourne had a programme identical to that of the prior Olympiad. The equestrian events for these Games were held in Stockholm due to Australia's strict equine quarantine laws.

=== 1960–1968 ===
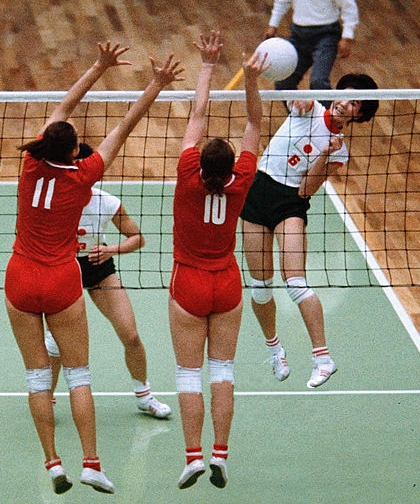
The Oriental Witches, a name given by the reports of European media given their victories.

Speed skating for women made its official debut at the 1960 Winter Olympics held in Squaw Valley, 28 years after appearing as a demonstration sport in 1932. Helga Haase, representing the United Team of Germany, won the inaugural gold medal for women, in the 500 metres event. At the 1960 Summer Olympics held in Rome, the women's team foil event was introduced in fencing, with the Soviet Union winning the inaugural gold. The women's 800 metres event returned to the athletics programme for the first time since 1928 and the women's K-2 500 metres event was added to the canoeing programme. In gymnastics, the women's team portable apparatus competition was removed.

At the 1964 Winter Olympics in Innsbruck, the women's 5km cross-country skiing event debuted. At the 1964 Summer Olympics held in Tokyo, volleyball made its debut with the host Japanese taking the gold. Women comprised 13% of the participants at the 1964 Summer Games.

At the 1968 Winter Olympics held in Grenoble, women's luge appeared for the first time. Erika Lechner of Italy won the gold after East German racers Ortrun Enderlein, Anna-Maria Müller and Angela Knösel allegedly heated the runners on their sleds and were disqualified. Whether the East Germans actually heated their sleds or if the situation was fabricated by the West Germans remains a mystery. At the 1968 Summer Olympics in Mexico City, women competed in shooting for the first time, with women being allowed to compete with the men in all seven events. At the opening ceremony on 12th October 1968, Enriqueta Basilio was the last torch-bearer and made history by becoming the first woman to light the Olympic Cauldron. The Games featured significant achievements by female athletes, such as gymnast Vera Caslavska, who won four gold medals, and swimmer Debbie Meyer who also had a notable performance, winning three golds.

=== 1972–1980 ===
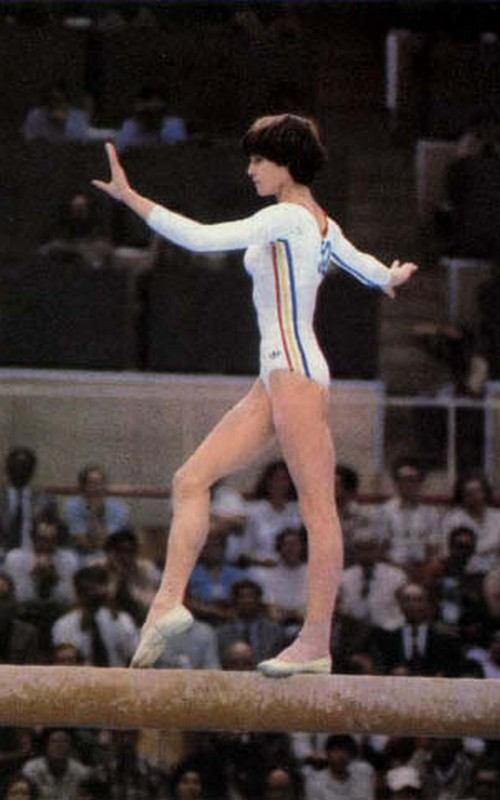
Nadia Comăneci on the balance beam, 1980.

At the 1972 Winter Olympics held in Sapporo there were no changes to the sports open to women. At the 1972 Summer Olympics in Munich, archery was held for the first time since 1920. British equestrian Lorna Johnstone was 70 years old when she rode at the 1972 Games, becoming the oldest woman ever to compete at an Olympic Games.

At the 1976 Winter Olympics in Innsbruck, ice dancing (a pairs event with one male skater and one female skater) was added to the programme. Women competed in three new sports at the 1976 Summer Olympics held in Montreal. Women's tournaments debuted in basketball and handball and women also competed for the first time in rowing, participating in six of the eight events. Nadia Comăneci, a Romanian gymnast, made history at the 1976 Montreal Olympics by scoring the first perfect 10.0 in Olympic gymnastics. Her remarkable performance, which included seven perfect scores and three gold medals, elevated the global profile of women's gymnastics. Comăneci's achievements set new standards in the sport and continue to inspire future generations of gymnasts.

There were no new events for women at the 1980 Winter Olympics held in Lake Placid. At the 1980 Summer Olympics held in Moscow, women's field hockey debuted. The underdog Zimbabwean team pulled off a major upset, winning the gold, the nation's first ever Olympic medal. However, these Olympics were marred by the US-led boycott of the games due to the Soviet invasion of Afghanistan.

=== 1984–1992 ===
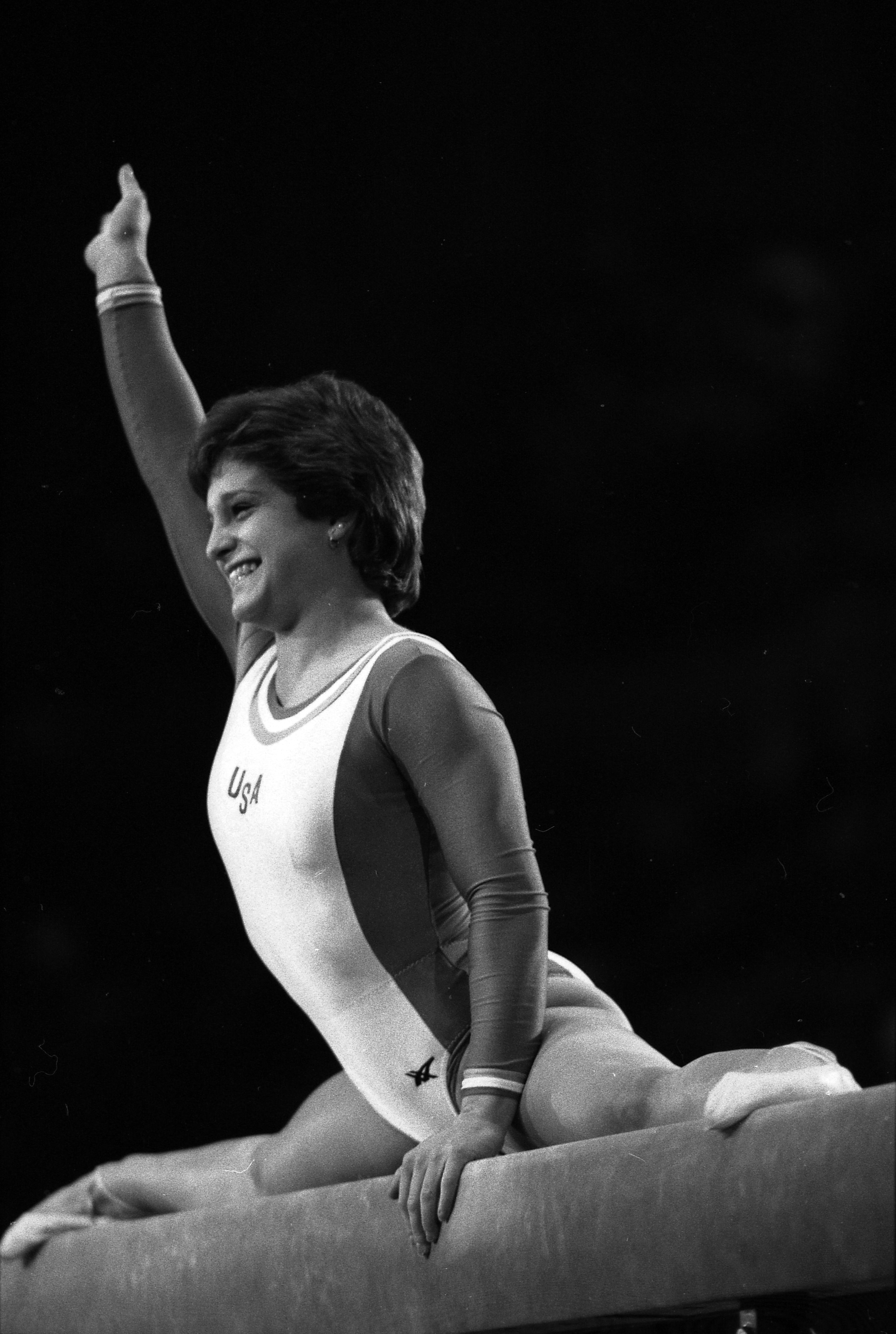
Mary Lou Retton performing splits on a balance beam, 1985.

The women's 20 kilometre cross-country skiing event was added to the programme for the 1984 Winter Games in Sarajevo. Marja-Liisa Hämäläinen of Finland dominated the cross-country events, winning gold in all three distances. Multiple new events for women were introduced at the 1984 Summer Olympics in Los Angeles. Synchronized swimming made its debut, with only women competing in the competition. The host Americans won gold in both the solo and duet events. Women also made their debut in cycling, competing in the road race. This event was also won by an American, Connie Carpenter. Rhythmic gymnastics also appeared for the first time with only women competing; the winner was Canadian Lori Fung. The women's marathon made its first appearance in these Games, with American Joan Benoit winning gold in 2:24:52, a time many thought was impossible for women just a few years earlier. These were also the first Games featuring events where women competed only against other women in shooting. These games were boycotted by the Soviet Union and its satellite states. At the 1984 Los Angeles Olympics, women made up 23% of the participants.

There were no new events at the 1988 Winter Olympics held in Calgary. At the 1988 Summer Olympics in Seoul, table tennis appeared for the first time for both men and women. They competed in the singles and doubles events. Also, a female specific sailing event debuted at these Games, the women's 470. For the first time women competed in a track cycling event, the sprint. Women's judo was held as a demonstration sport at these Games.

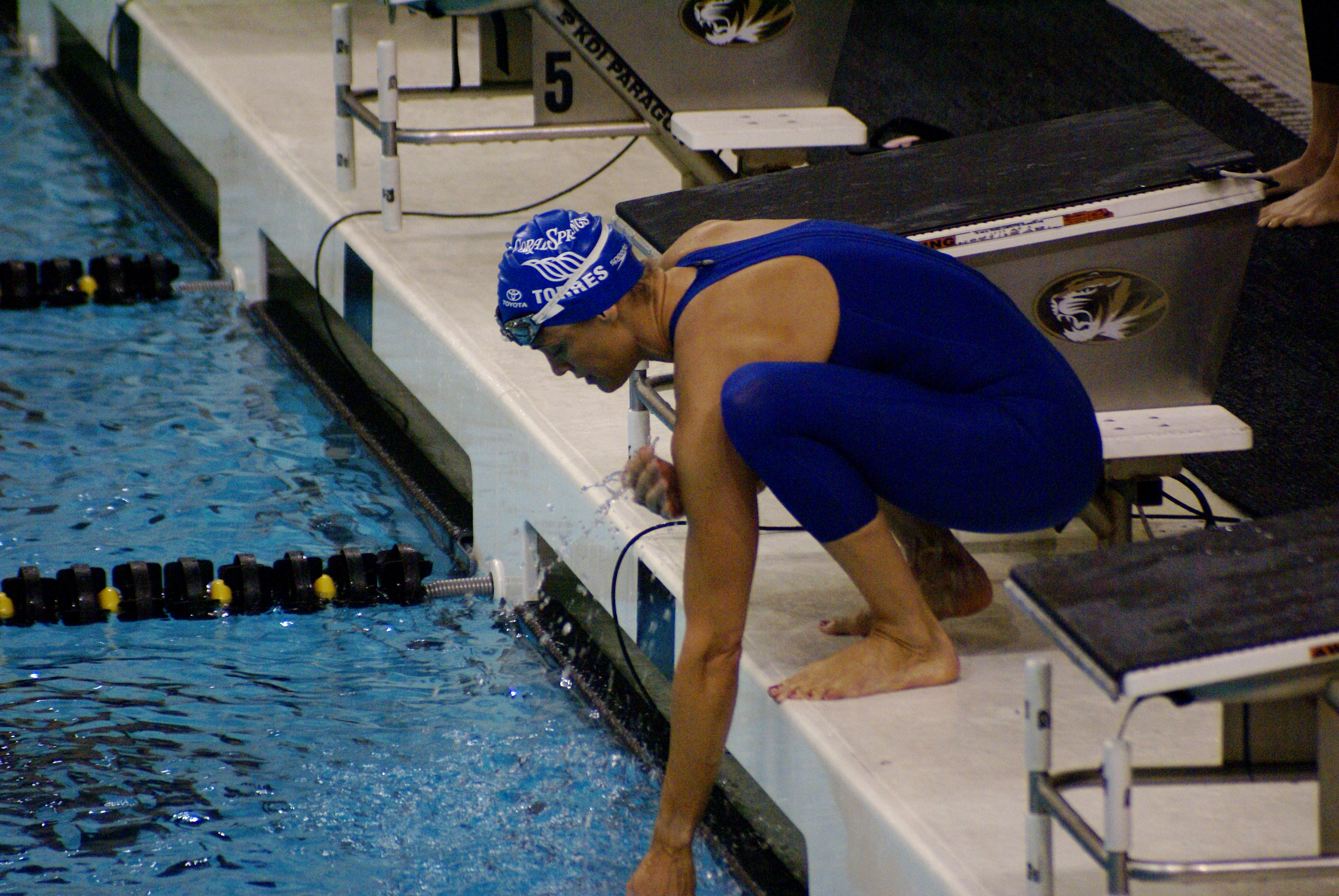
Dara Torres celebrated not only for her athletic achievements but also for defying age norms in competitive sports.

In 1991, the IOC made it mandatory for all new sports applying for Olympic recognition to have female competitors. This rule only applied to new sports applying for Olympic recognition, meaning that any sport that was included in the Olympic programme prior to 1991 could continue to exclude female participants at the discretion of the sport's federation.

At the 1992 Winter Olympics in Albertville, women competed in biathlon for the first time. The athletes competed in the individual, sprint and relay events. Freestyle skiing also debuted at the 1992 Games, where women competed in the moguls event. Short-track speed skating first appeared at these Games. Women competed in the 500 metres and the 3000 metre relay. At the 1992 Summer Olympics held in Barcelona, badminton appeared on the programme for the first time. Women competed in the singles and doubles competitions. Women also competed in the sport of judo for the first time at these Games after women's judo was a demonstration sport in 1988. 35 nations still sent all-male delegations to these Games. 1992 was the last Olympic games with the skeet competition open to both men and women, and the only time a mixed shooting competition at the Olympics was won by a woman: Zhang Shan.

=== 1994–2002 ===
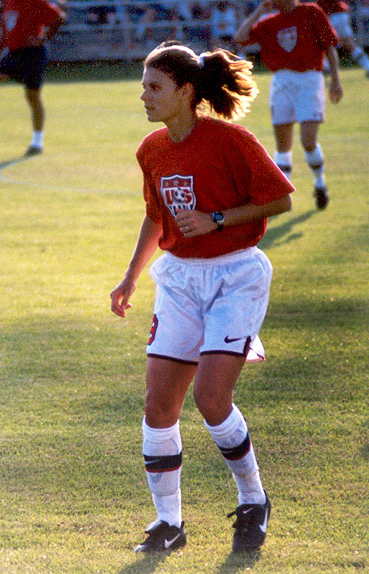
Mia Hamm warming up before a match, 1998.

At the 1994 Winter Olympics in Lillehammer, the aerials event in freestyle skiing officially debuted. Lina Cheryazova of Uzbekistan won the gold medal, which is to date her nation's sole medal at an Olympic Winter Games.

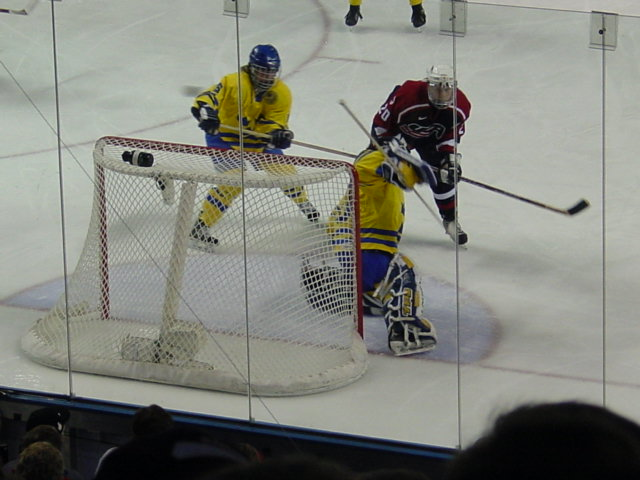
Sweden playing the United States in ice hockey at the 2002 Winter Olympics in Salt Lake City.

The promotion of women became a key mission of the International Olympic Committee (IOC) and was enshrined in the Olympic Charter. By the 1996 Atlanta Olympics, this commitment was evident as the proportion of female participants had increased to 26%. The 1996 Olympics in Atlanta represented a watershed moment for women's football and for softball, marking its official debut as an Olympic sport. The United States women's national soccer team clinched a historic gold medal in a thrilling final against China. This victory was not only the team's first-ever Olympic gold in women's football but also a triumph achieved on home soil in Atlanta. The success of the U.S. team laid a solid foundation for the growth of women's football on the international stage, inspiring young athletes and paving the way for further advancements in women's sports.

At the 1998 Winter Olympics in Nagano, ice hockey (with the United States winning gold) and curling (with Canada winning gold) debuted for women with snowboarding also being introduced for both women and men.

Numerous new sports and disciplines made their premieres at the 2000 Summer Olympics in Sydney. Women could finally compete in modern pentathlon, water polo and weightlifting, as well as in the newly introduced taekwondo, trampoline gymnastics and triathlon.

At the 2002 Winter Olympics in Salt Lake City, women's bobsleigh made its first appearance. Jill Bakken and Vonetta Flowers of the USA won the two-woman competition, the sole bobsleigh event for women at the 2002 Games.

=== 2004–2012 ===
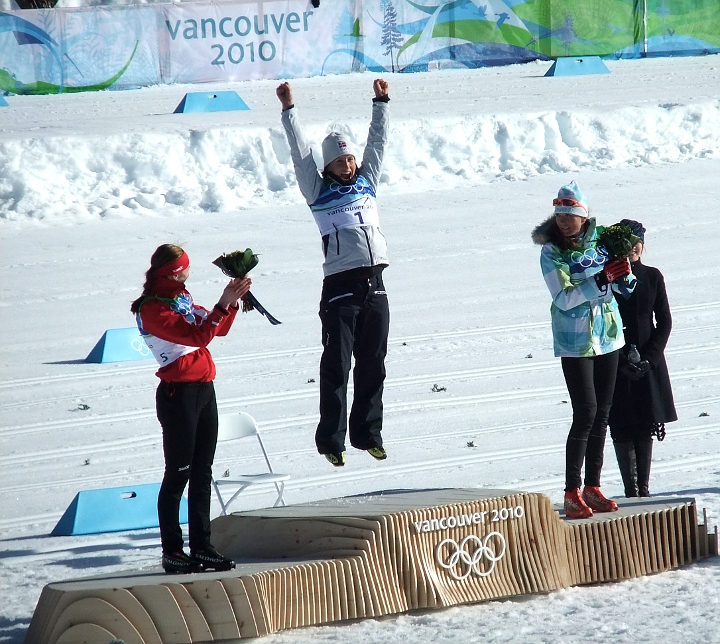
Marit Bjørgen former Norwegian cross-country skier celebrates sprint gold at the 2010 Olympics.

From 2004 to 2012, the Olympic Games witnessed pivotal advancements for women in sports, symbolising a transformative period towards greater gender equity and inclusivity. The 2004 Athens Summer Olympics marked historic firsts as women's wrestling and sabre fencing were introduced. These milestones not only expanded the range of sports available to women but also challenged cultural barriers, exemplified by Mariel Zagunis of the USA winning gold in sabre fencing, showcasing women's athletic prowess on a global stage. In 2004, women from Afghanistan competed at the Olympics for the first time in their history after the nation was banned from Sydney 2000 by the IOC due to the Taliban government's opposition to women in sports.

In the subsequent 2008 Summer Olympics, the inclusion of BMX cycling, women's 3000 m steeplechase, and the 10 kilometre marathon swim further diversified the Games, providing new platforms for female athletes to excel. Baseball and boxing remained the only sports not open to women at these Games.

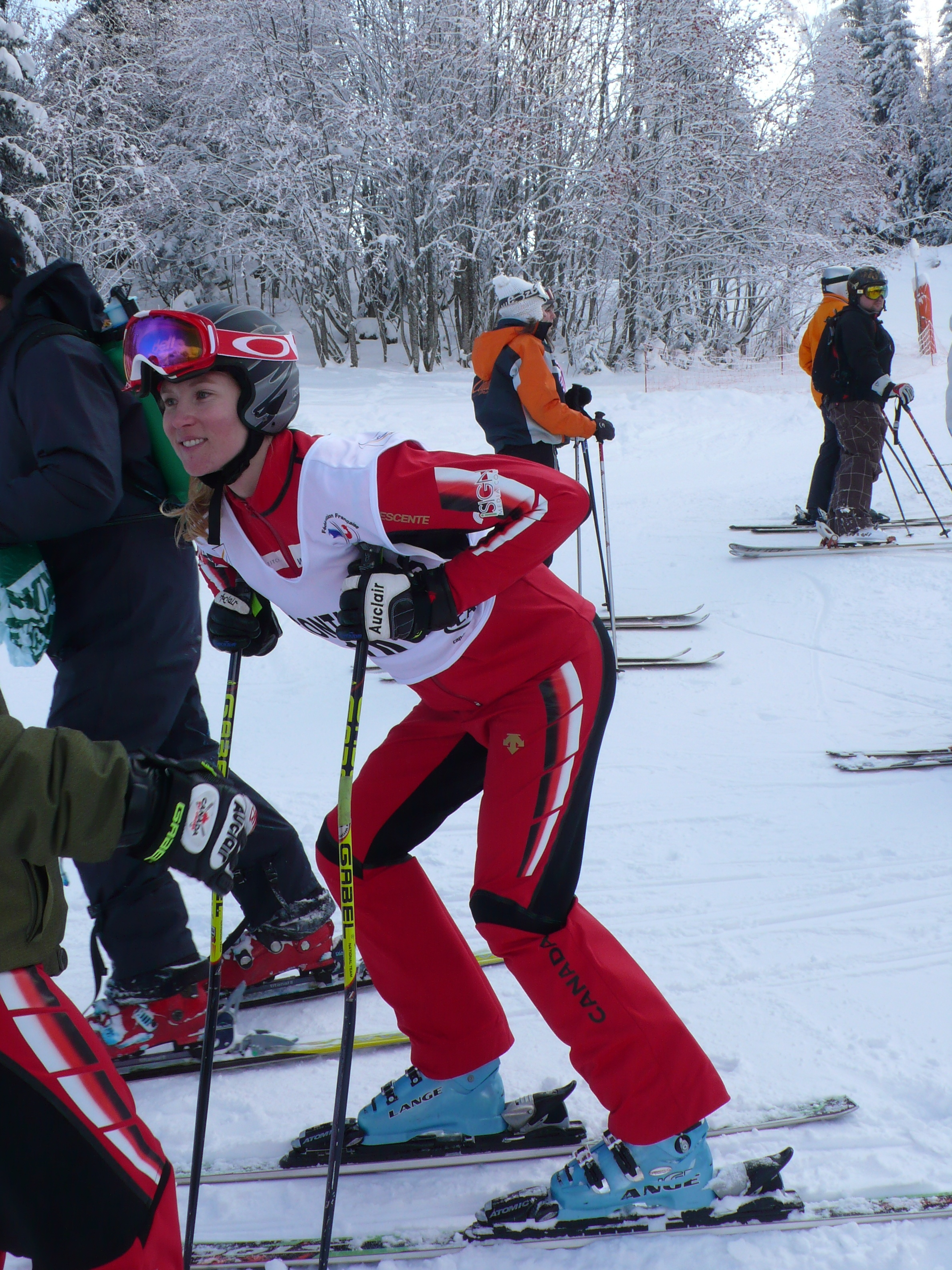
Ashleigh McIvor becoming the first woman to win a gold medal in ski cross, a sport that debuted at those Games.

The 2010 Vancouver Winter Olympics continued this trend with the debut of ski cross for both men and women. Ashleigh McIvor of Canada won the inaugural gold for women in the sport. Controversy was created when women's ski jumping was excluded from the programme by the IOC due to the low number of athletes and participating nations in the sport. A group of fifteen competitive female ski jumpers later filed a suit against the Vancouver Organizing Committee for the 2010 Olympic and Paralympic Winter Games on the grounds that it violated the Canadian Charter of Rights and Freedoms since men were competing in the same event. The suit failed, with the judge ruling that the situation was not governed by the Charter.

By the 2012 London Summer Olympics, however, strides towards gender parity were evident as women's boxing made its Olympic debut. This, combined with the decision by the IOC to drop baseball from the programme for 2012, meant that women competed in every sport at a Summer Games for the first time. This landmark event was accompanied by a significant global shift, as all national Olympic committees sent female athletes and countries such as Brunei, Saudi Arabia, and Qatar included women in their delegations for the first time, reflecting a broader embrace of women's sports participation worldwide. In 2012, for the first time, women athletes outnumbered the men on Team USA. By 2012, women constituted approximately 44% of the total athlete population at the Olympics, highlighting substantial progress in overcoming gender barriers and fostering a more inclusive sporting environment. The London Games of 2012 were particularly notable for being referred to as "the Women's Games," reflecting the substantial advancements in female athlete participation. These developments underscored the Olympic movement's commitment to gender equality, providing women with enhanced opportunities to showcase their talents and inspiring future generations of female athletes to pursue their Olympic dreams.

=== 2014–2018 ===
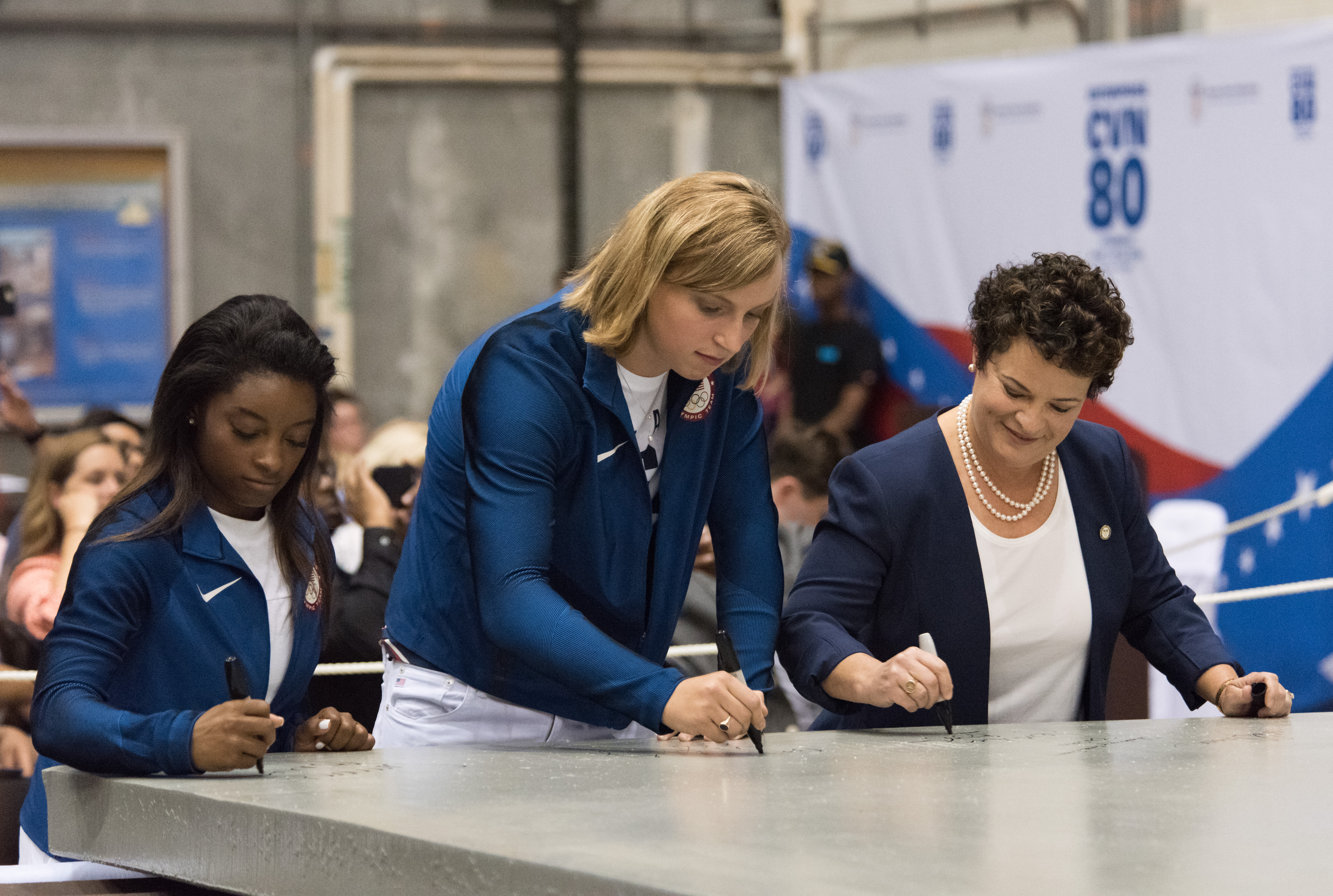
Katie Ledecky (middle) and fellow Olympic champion Simone Biles (left) sign steel plate of USS Enterprise (2017).

The 2014 Winter Olympics in Sochi saw a groundbreaking moment with Carina Vogt winning the first-ever gold medal in women's ski jumping, marking the event's long-awaited debut. This achievement was a pivotal step forward for gender equality in winter sports.

The 2016 Summer Olympics followed suit with another historic first as the Australian women's rugby sevens team triumphed in the first Olympic women's rugby tournament, showcasing the sport's inaugural appearance and emphasising its growing global appeal. Meanwhile, Rio 2016 also welcomed the return of golf to the Olympic programme after an absence of over a century. Inbee Park of South Korea seized the opportunity, clinching the gold medal and rekindling interest in golf as an Olympic sport. Women competed in the same number of weight categories as men for the first time in freestyle wrestling. The Games also set a remarkable record for Team USA's female contingent, with 291 women competing across various sports and collectively bringing home an unprecedented 65 medals. Among the standout athletes were Katie Ledecky and Simone Biles, who each secured five medals, underscoring their dominance in swimming and gymnastics respectively.

At the 2018 Winter Olympics in PyeongChang, the Olympics continued to evolve with the introduction of new events which included big air snowboarding, mass start speed skating, mixed doubles curling and mixed team alpine skiing. Jamie Anderson of the USA emerged as a standout, notching medals in both big air and slopestyle snowboarding, cementing her status as one of the most decorated female snowboarders in Olympic history.

=== 2020–present ===
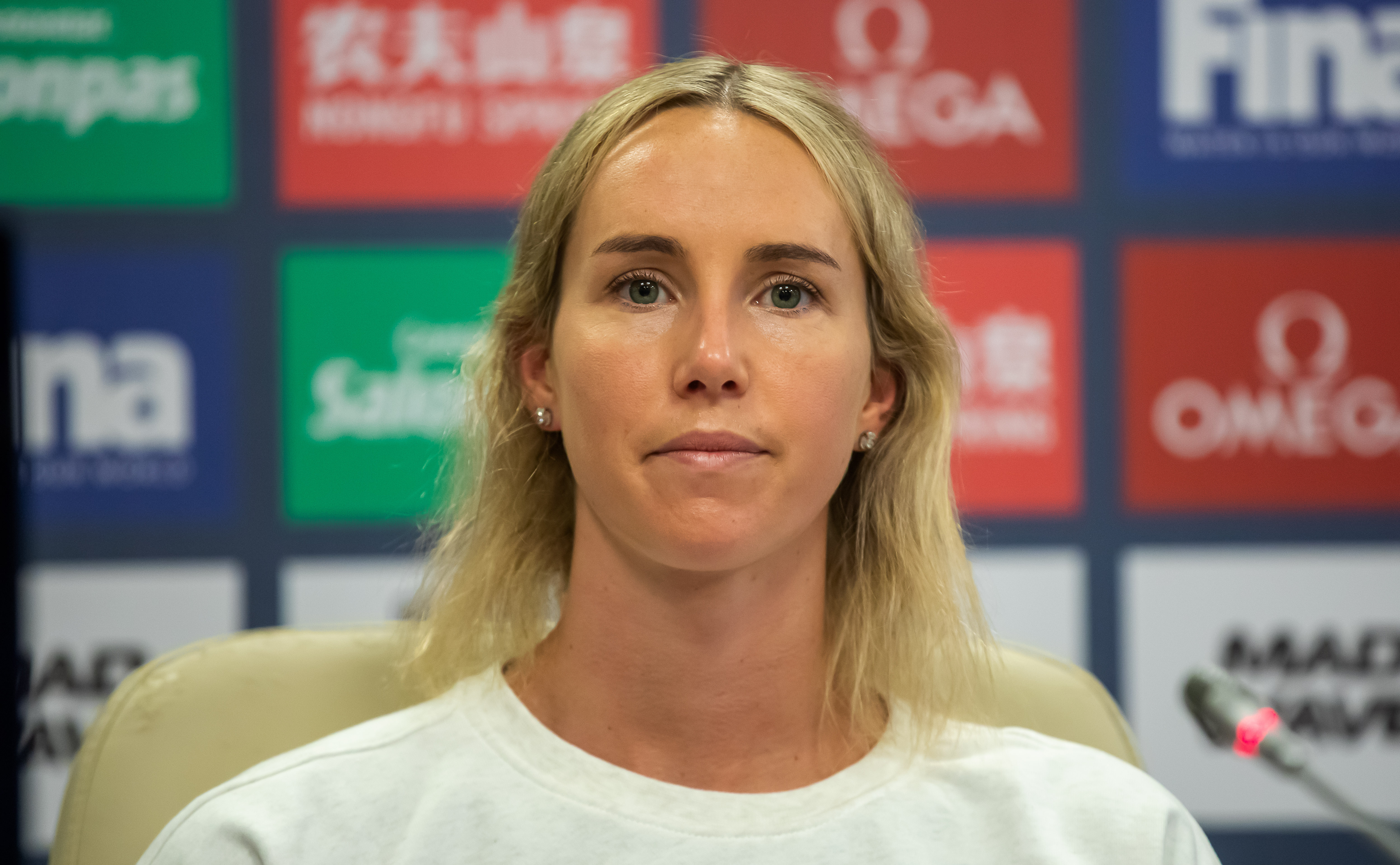
Emma McKeon With four gold and three bronze medals she was the most decorated athlete across all sports at the 2020 Summer Olympics, and tied for the most medals won by a woman in a single Olympic Games.

In 2020, an IOC policy change permitted one male and one female athlete to jointly carry their nation's flag during the opening ceremony of the 2020 Tokyo Summer Olympics, resulting in 194 female athletes selected as flag bearers. The 2020 Olympics introduced four new sports, all with women's events (karate, sport climbing, surfing, and skateboarding), as well as the one-time reintroduction of softball and women's events in the new disciplines of 3x3 basketball and freestyle BMX. It also introduced nine new mixed-gender events in several sports (archery, judo, three events in shooting, table tennis, triathlon, a 4 × 400 m relay in athletics and a 4 × 100 medley relay in swimming). Several existing sports made attempts to ensure gender parity. A men's 800 metre freestyle event and a women's 1500 metre freestyle event were added in swimming so that the men's and women's programmes were equal. There were multiple events added in canoeing in the canoe sprint and canoe slalom disciplines which marked the first time women could compete in canoes at the Olympics, something they hadn't been allowed to do until Tokyo 2020. In canoe sprint, the men's C-1 200 metres and men's K-2 200 metres were replaced with women's C-1 200 metres and women's C-2 500 metres. In canoe slalom, the men's C-2 was removed and the women's C-1 was added. In addition, the sprint men's K-4 1000 metres was replaced with a shorter race, the men's K-4 500 metres to match the women's. The men-only shooting events of the 50 metre pistol and the 50 metre rifle prone were removed as well as the men's double trap (12 years after the women's was removed) and men and women received an equal number of shots. Two categories were added to women's boxing while two were dropped from the men's resulting in five events for women and eight events for men. Women's boxing competitions also took place over three three-minute rounds to match the men's instead of the four rounds of two minutes each which had taken place since women's boxing was first introduced to the Olympics in 2012. In rowing, the men's lightweight coxless four was removed and the women's coxless four was added for the first time since 1992 to equalise the men's and women's programmes. A women's team foil event and a men's team sabre event were added in fencing. The Madison returned to cycling, with a women's event making its debut. The men's singles tennis final was reduced to a three-set match from five sets which brought it in line with the women's. New Zealand's Laurel Hubbard became the first openly transgender woman to compete at the Olympics, participating in the women's +87 kg weightlifting event.

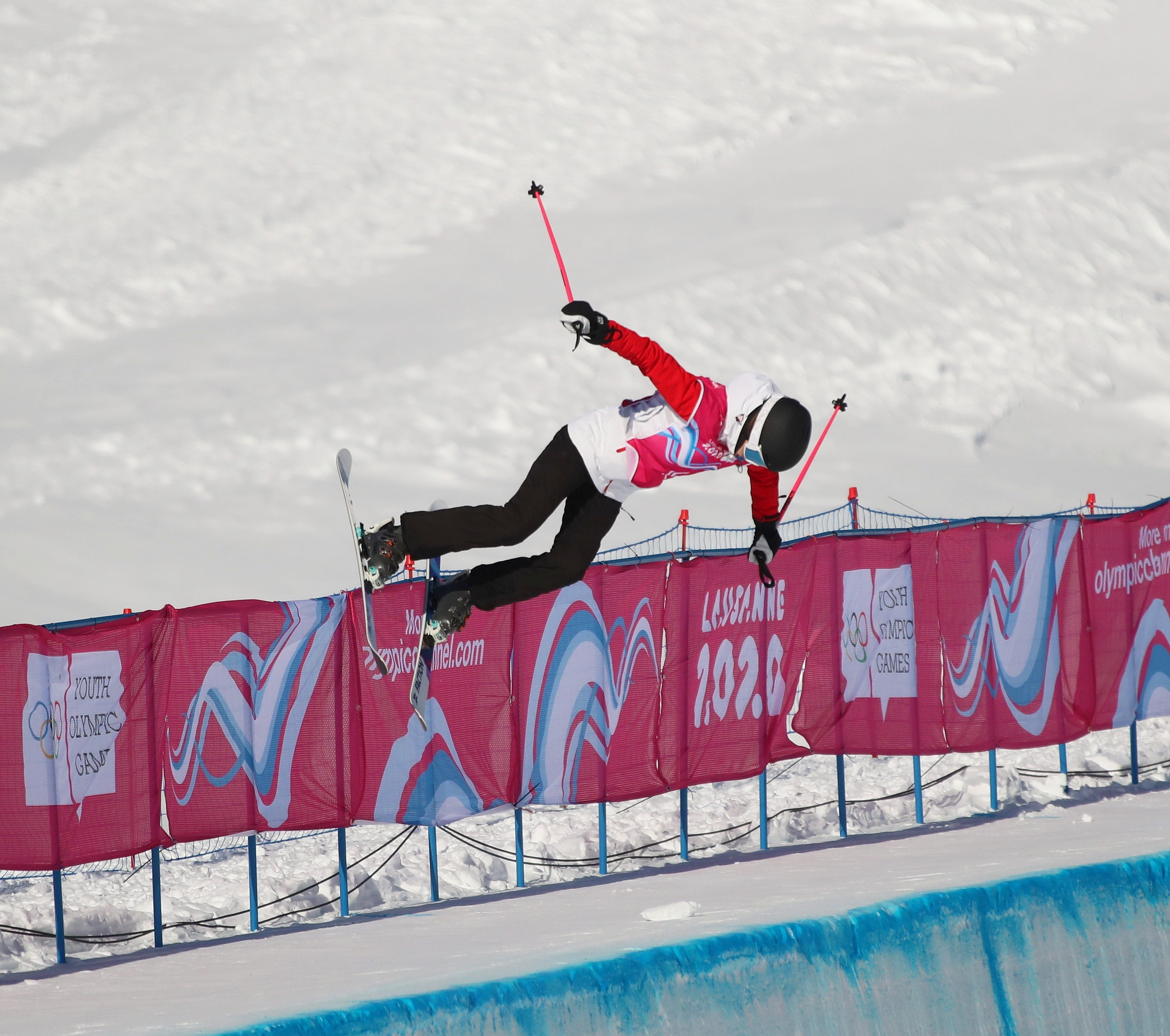
Eileen Gu won three gold medals in freestyle skiing and snowboarding events.

The International Ski Federation stated in 2017 that it aimed to include women's Nordic combined in the Olympic program for the first time at the 2022 Winter Olympics in Beijing. However, Nordic combined at the 2022 Winter Olympics ended up having three men-only events, just as in 2018. A new monobob event was introduced in bobsleigh, only open to women. Women accounted for 44.7% of the athletes competing in Beijing and participated in 53.2% of the total combined events. Athletes like Eileen Gu in freestyle skiing/snowboarding and Anna Shcherbakova in figure skating stood out with their gold medal performances.

The 2024 Games introduced men's participation in artistic swimming (with a maximum of two male members per eight-person team, although none managed to compete), a new women's weight class in boxing and the removal of one weight class from men's boxing, the replacement of the men's C-2 1000 metre and K-2 1000 metre events in canoeing with C-2 500 metre and K-2 500 metre events for parity with the women's, the removal of the men-only Finn event in sailing, the replacement of the men's and women's 470 sailing events with a mixed-gender 470 event, and the addition of a marathon race walk mixed relay in athletics to replace the men-only 50 kilometres race walk event due to its lack of female participation. Several sports also finally achieved gender parity such as cycling which instituted several significant changes in the road and track cycling, with some men's quota places transferred to the women's side (for example each country had previously been limited to sending five men and four women to the Summer Games in road cycling) and with the number of riders in women's team sprint increasing from two to three.

As of 2024, women constituted 41% of the members of the International Olympic Committee (IOC). The 2024 Paris Olympics were notable for being "the first Olympic Games in history with full gender parity on the field of play". Of the 11,215 athletes registered, 5,712 were men and 5,503 were women. Multiple non-binary and trans-male athletes, such as Hergie Bacyadan, competed in women's events. Boxer Cindy Ngamba won the first ever medal for the Refugee Olympic Team. The last medal ceremony of the Games was for the women's marathon instead of the men's for the first time, with the last medal of the Games awarded to Sifan Hassan who represented the Netherlands. The 2024 Olympics showcased 28 gender-balanced sports out of 32 and there were 157 medal events designated for men, 152 medal events designated for women and 20 mixed-gender events (if counting the mixed team event in artistic gymnastics as a women's event as only women competed). Aquatics (artistic swimming, water polo), football, gymnastics (rhythmic gymnastics) and wrestling (Greco-Roman wrestling) were the four sports which did not have an equal number of male and female athletes and artistic gymnastics, artistic swimming, boxing, Greco-Roman wrestling and rhythmic gymnastics were the disciplines which did not have an equal number of medal events for male and female athletes.

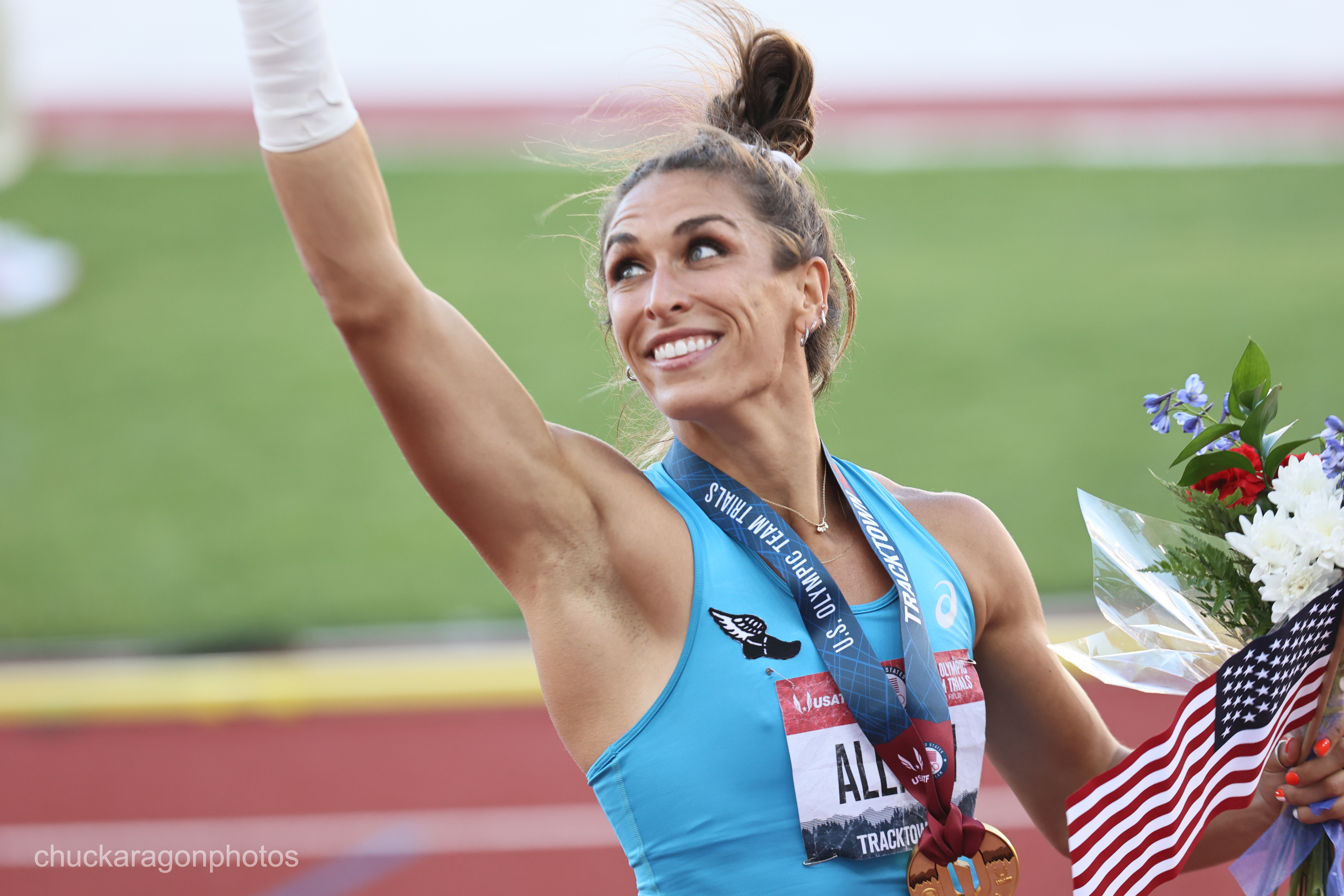
American track and field athlete Valarie Allman specializing in the discus throw.

At the 2024 Summer Olympics in Paris, Team USA's roster included a greater number of women than men for the fourth consecutive Games. The U.S. team comprised 314 women and 279 men. When considering both mixed and team events, American women contributed to 57% of the 126 medals won by Team USA. In the gold medal tally, American women made a significant impact, securing 26 of the country's 40 gold medals. This performance tied the U.S. with China for the highest number of golds. Notably, swimmer Katie Ledecky distinguished herself by winning two gold medals, one silver, and one bronze in Paris, thereby becoming the most decorated American woman in Olympic history with 14 career medals. Ledecky's achievements included setting new records, such as in the 4 × 100 m medley relay with teammates Regan Smith, Lilly King, Gretchen Walsh, and Torri Huske. Smith also set an American record in the 200m butterfly, earning a silver medal. Caroline Marks secured her second consecutive Olympic gold medal in women's surfing at the 2024 Olympics, defeating Tatiana Weston-Webb from Brazil. Gymnast Simone Biles further solidified her reputation as one of the greatest gymnasts of all time by winning three gold medals and one silver, totaling 11 career Olympic medals and making her the most decorated American gymnast in Olympic history. Biles, along with Suni Lee, contributed to USA Gymnastics' historic achievement of having two women's all-around gold medalists in a single Olympics. In athletics, Sydney McLaughlin-Levrone excelled by becoming the first two-time gold medalist in the 400m hurdles, setting a new world record and securing another gold in the 4 × 400 m relay. Additionally, Valerie Allman defended her Olympic title in the discus throw, becoming the first American woman to win two gold medals in an Olympic field event.

The 2026 Milano Cortina Winter Olympics featured the return of the men's doubles in luge and the introduction of the women's doubles, as the doubles event had been an open gender event since 1994 but only men had competed. A women's large hill individual event in ski jumping was introduced, while the alpine skiing mixed team parallel event was dropped and a mixed relay team event in skeleton was introduced. For the first time, women raced the same distances as men in all cross-country skiing events. The Games had the highest percentage of women's participation in Winter Olympic history, at 47%.

In March 2026, the IOC announced a new policy for women's events, allowing only athletes classified as female through mandatory genetic sex screening to compete in it. The IOC stated that the new policy aims to create a consistent rule across all Olympic sports and prioritize fairness and safety during competition, while allowing athletes who do not meet the criteria to compete in male or open categories.

== Sports ==
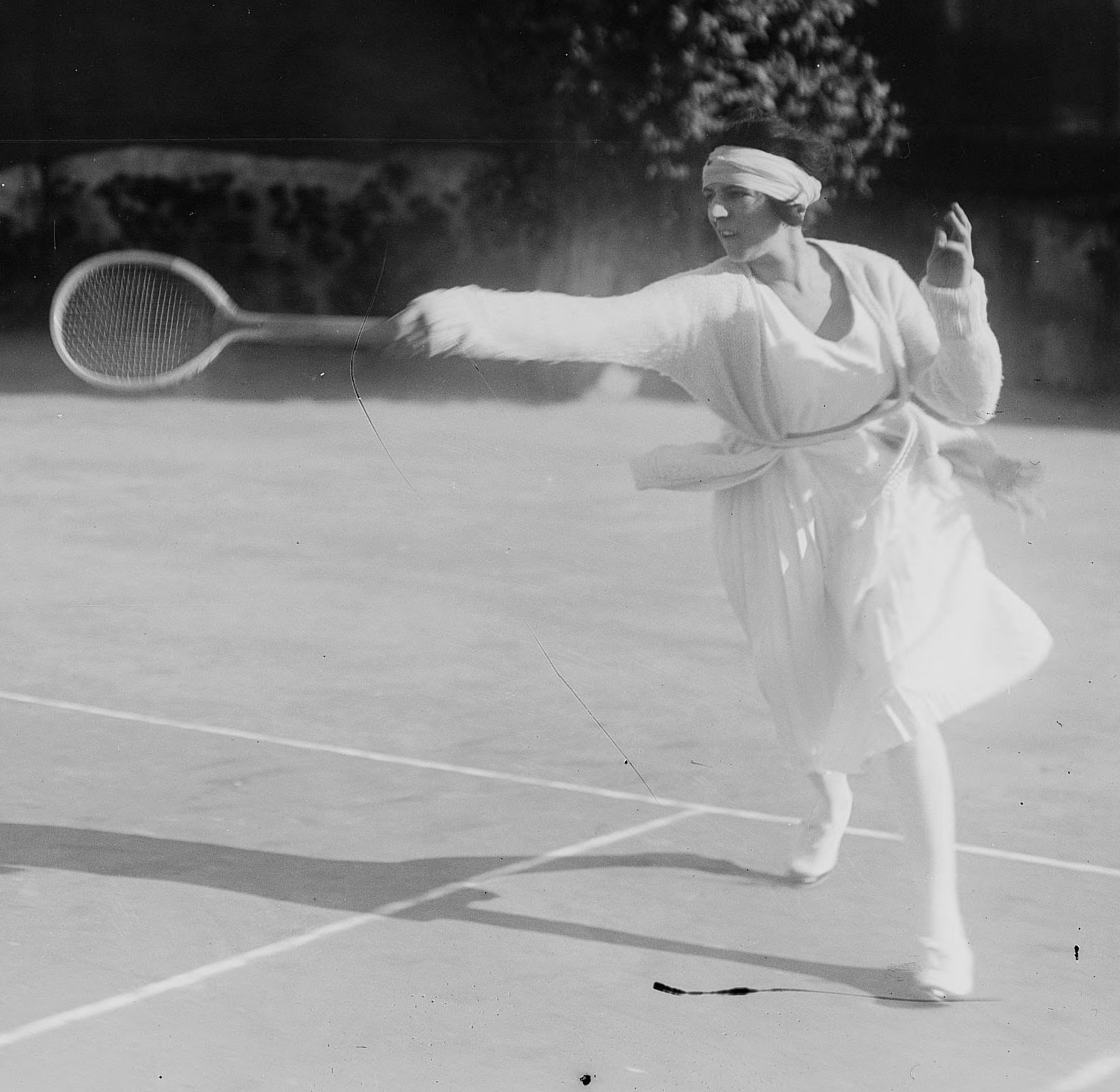
Suzanne Lenglen at Cannes in 1920.

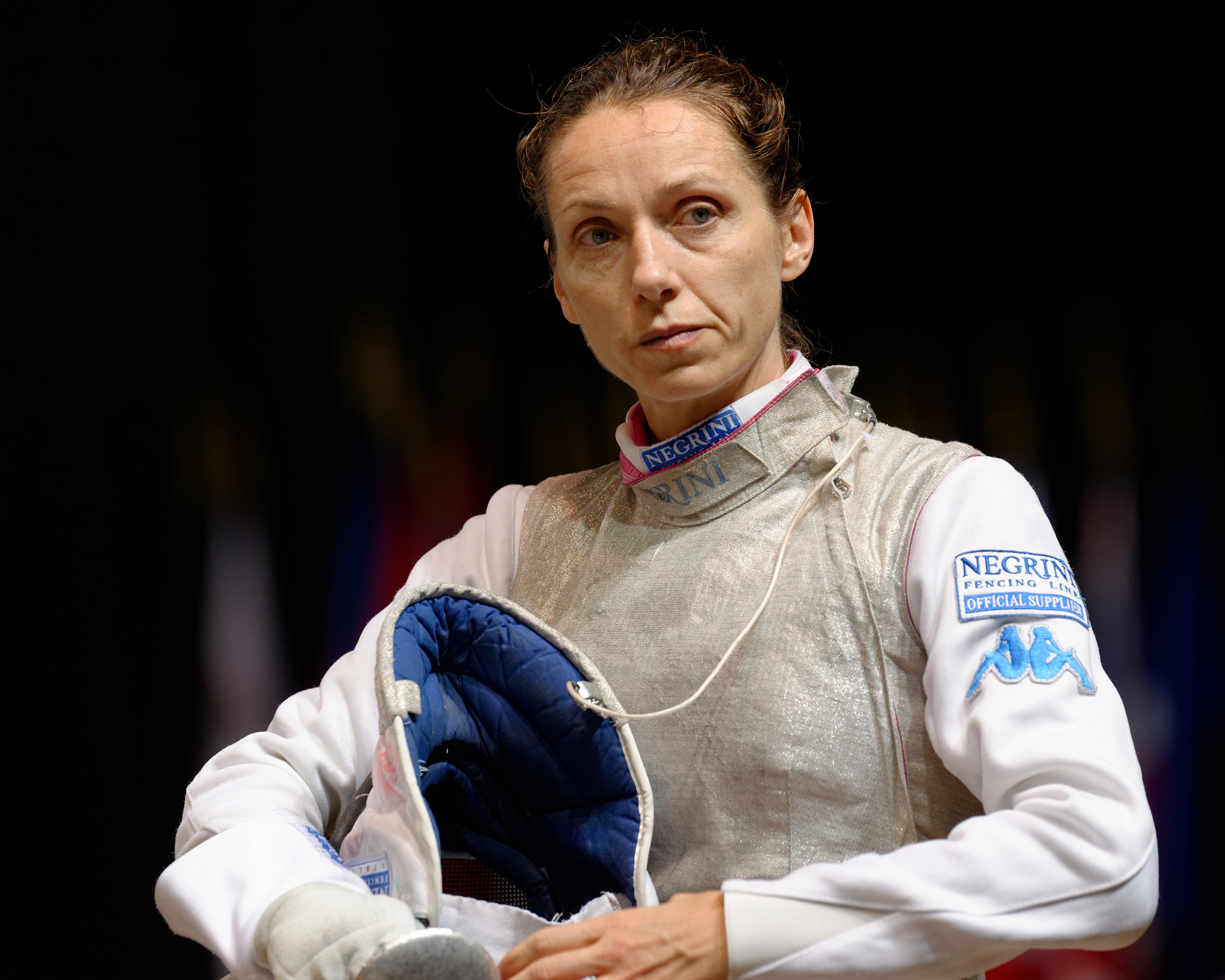
Valentina Vezzali is one of the most decorated fencers in Olympic history.

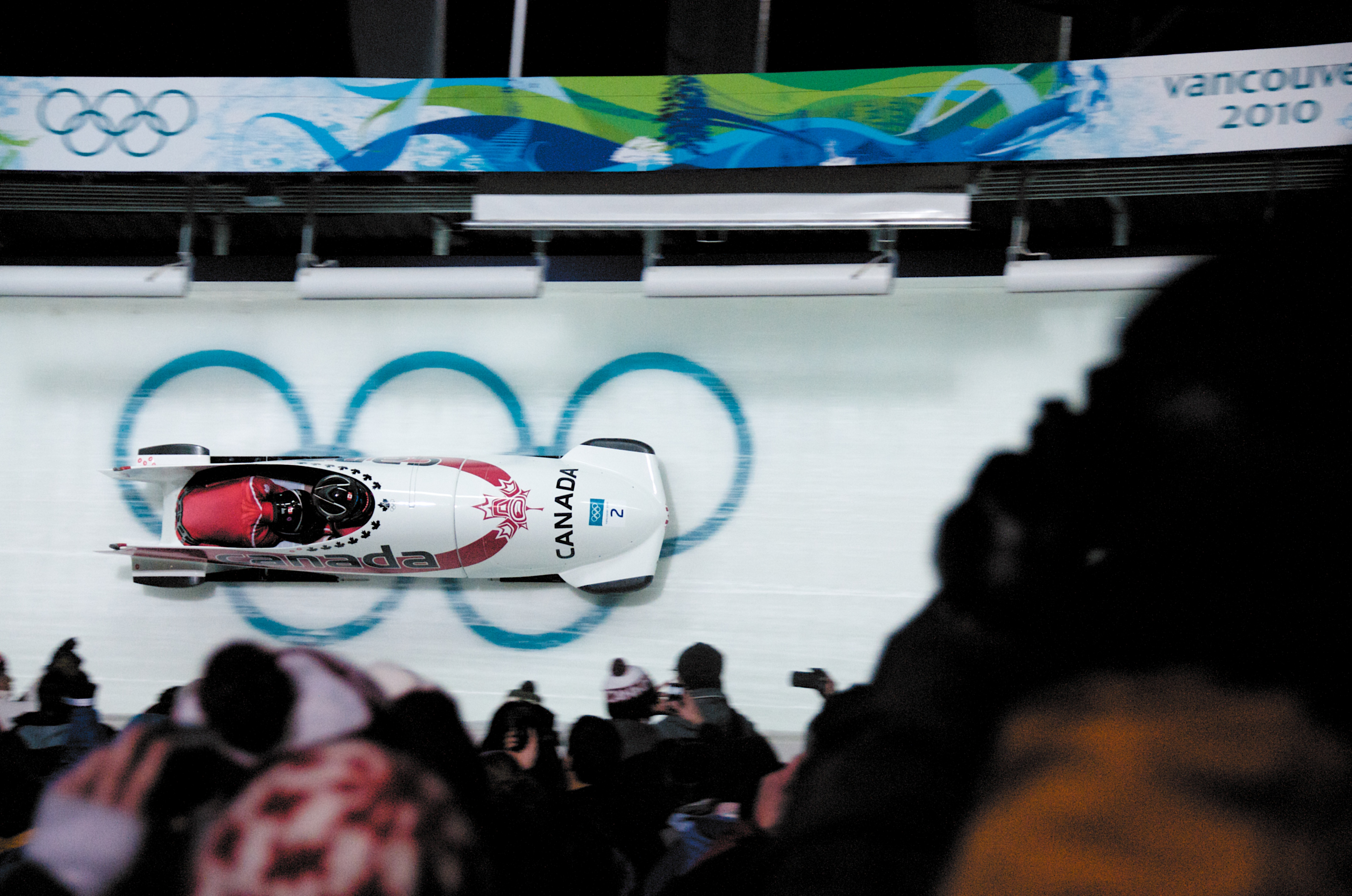
Canadian bobsledders Kaillie Humphries and Heather Moyse competing at the Vancouver 2010 Winter Games

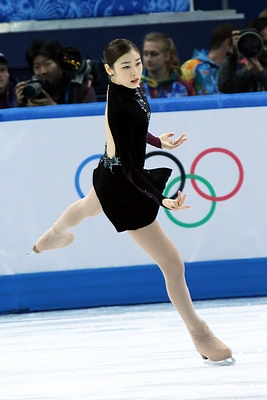
Yuna Kim performing to Adiós Nonino at the 2014 Winter Olympics.

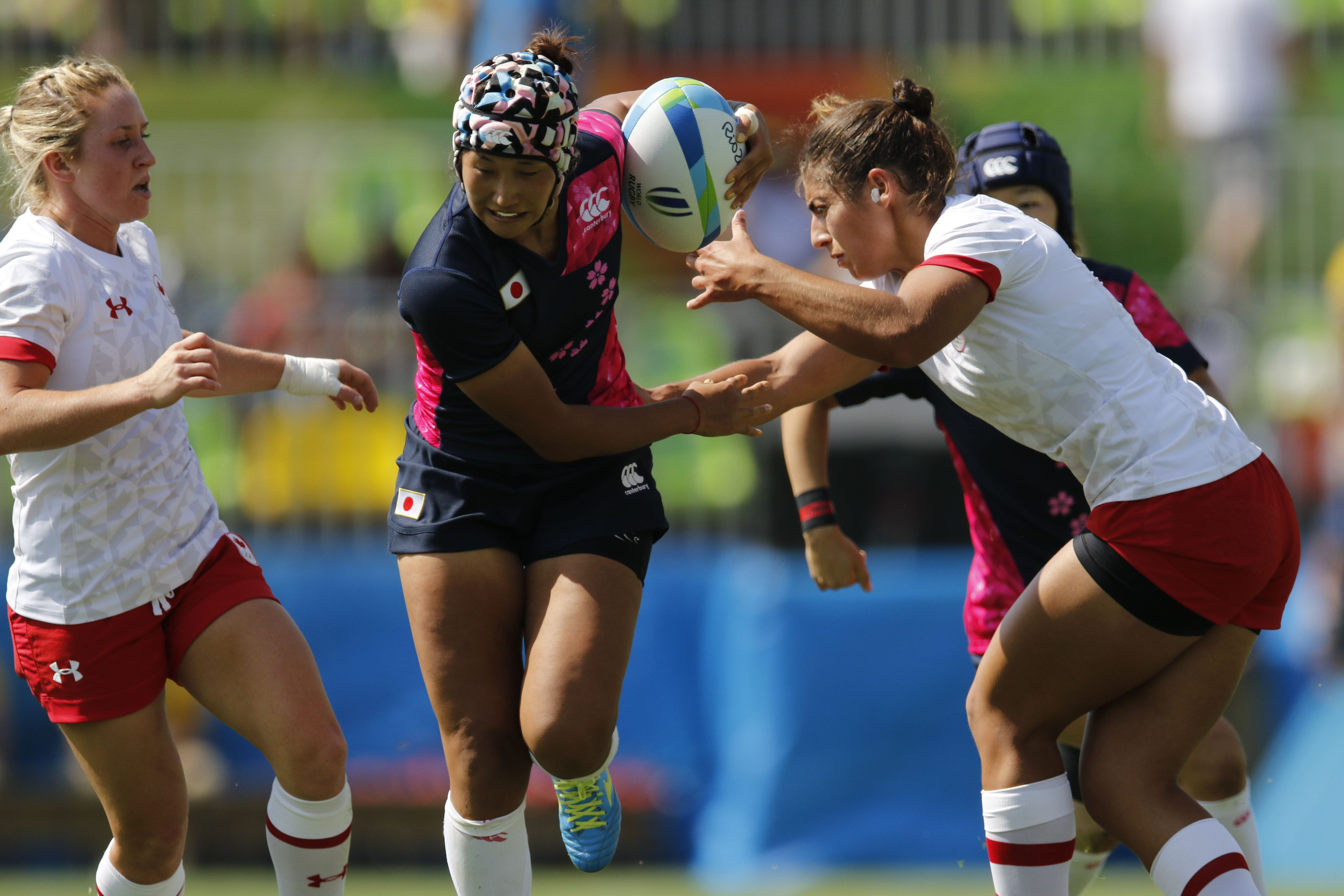
Canada versus Japan in Rugby sevens at the Rio 2016 Summer Games.

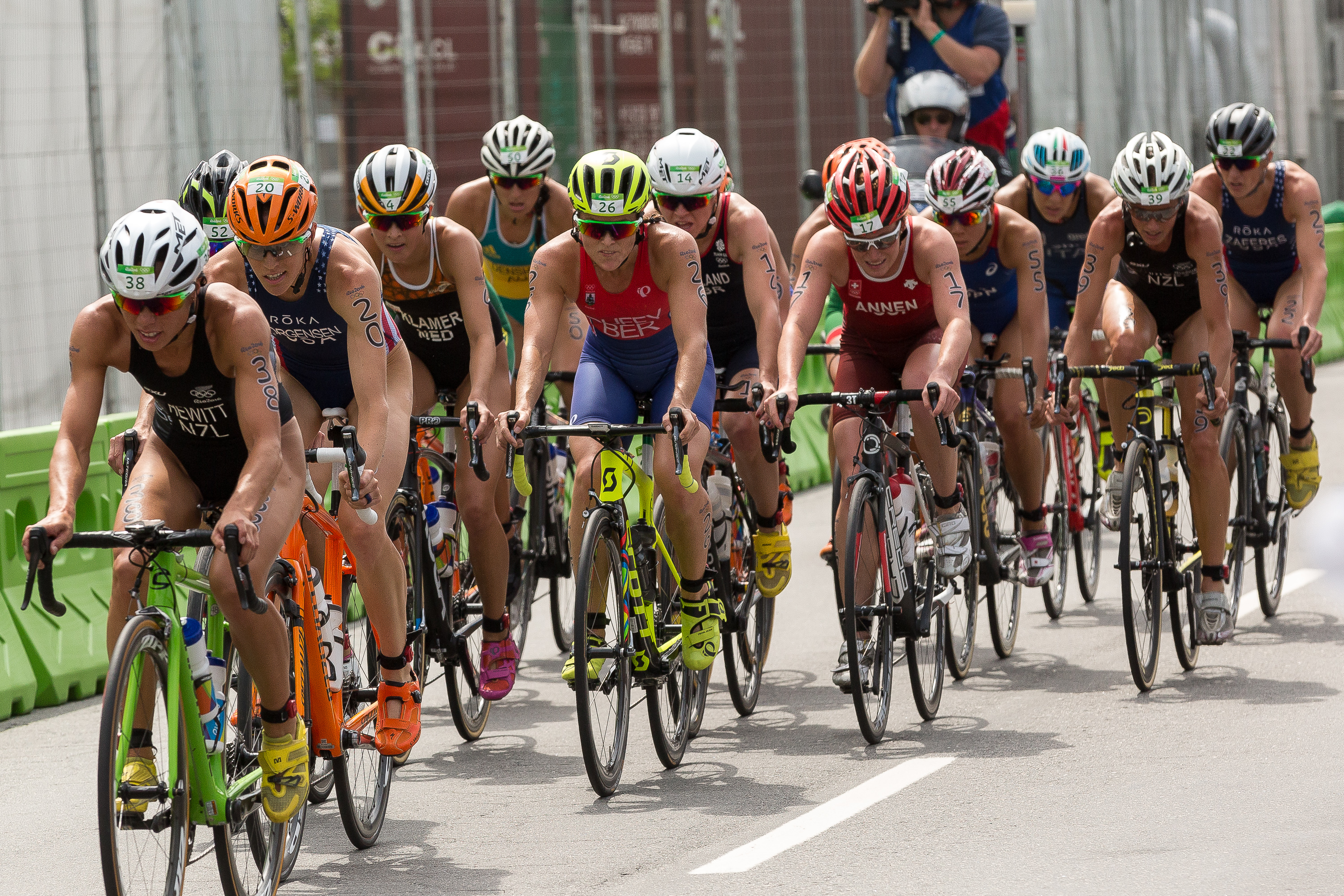
Athletes competing in the triathlon event during the 2016 Summer Olympics in Rio de Janeiro.

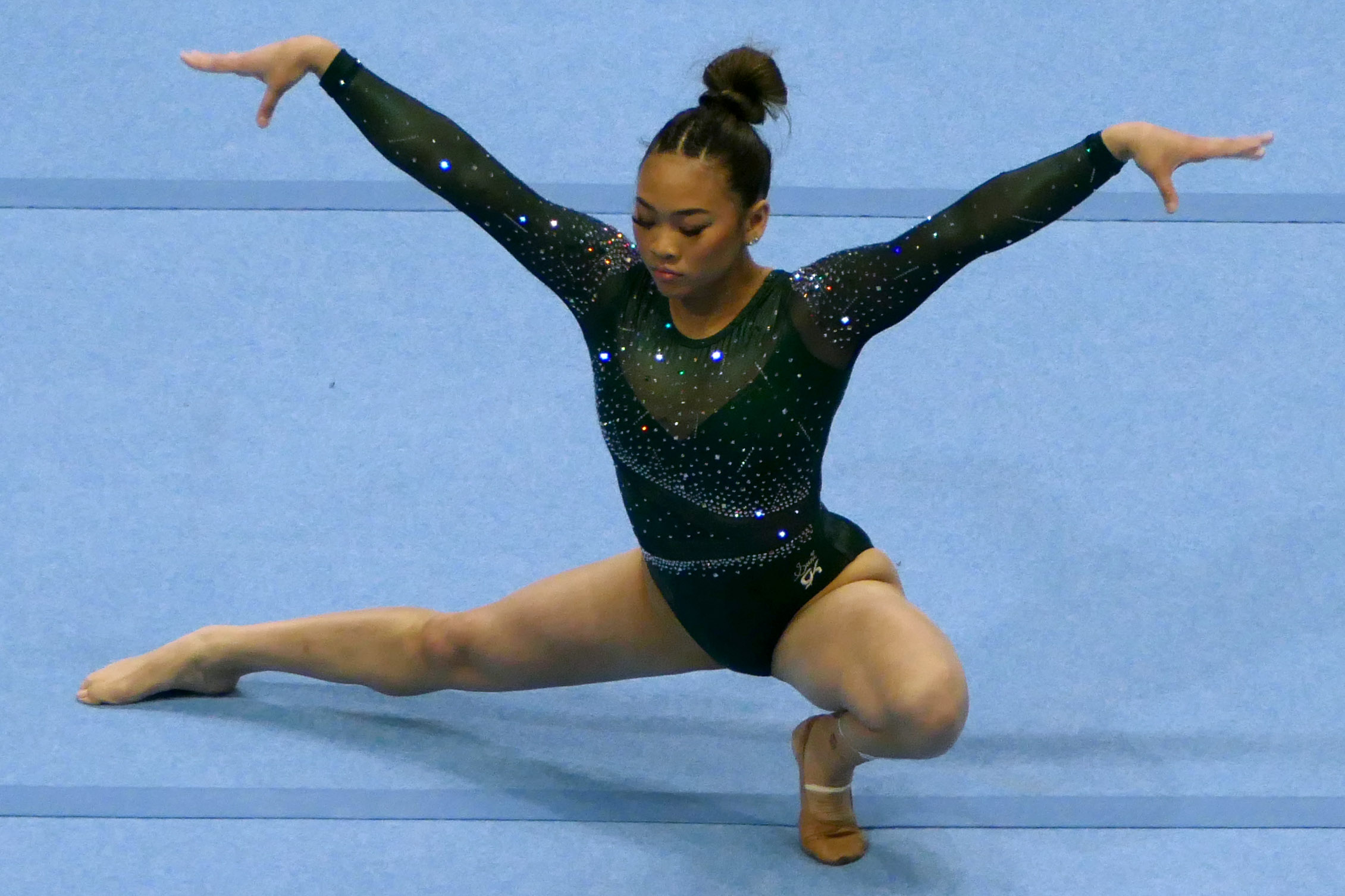
Sunisa Lee competing on floor at the 2024 Core Hydration Classic.

Women have competed in the following sports at the Olympic Games. Italics indicates the sport or discipline has been discontinued. Bold indicates women participation was featured in the sport or discipline's debut.

Sport	Year added to the programme
Croquet	**1900** (Note: Seven men and three women competed.)
Equestrian (Note: Driving in 1900, Dressage in 1952, Jumping in 1956 and Eventing in 1964. Vaulting: Never.)	**1900** (Note: The inclusion of women in the hacks and hunter combined event in 1900 was their only appearance in equestrian events until 1952. All equestrian events have been open-gender since 1964.)
Golf	**1900**
Sailing	**1900** (Note: All sailing events were open to women from 1900 to 1984 (except 1948). Women-only events were introduced in 1988.)
Tennis	1900
Archery	1904
Skating (Note: Figure skating in 1908, Speed skating in 1960 and Short track speed skating in 1992.)	**1908**
Water motorsports	**1908** (Note: All three events were open to women.)
Aquatics (Note: Diving in 1912, Swimming in 1912, Artistic swimming in 1984, Water polo in 2000 and Marathon swimming in 2008.)	1912
Fencing	1924
Athletics	1928
Gymnastics (Note: Artistic gymnastics in 1928, Rhythmic gymnastics in 1984 and Trampoline gymnastics in 2000.)	1928
Ski and snowboard (Note: Alpine skiing in 1936, Cross-country skiing in 1952, Freestyle skiing in 1992, Snowboard in 1998, Ski jumping in 2014 and Freeride in 2030. Nordic combined: Never.)	1936
Canoeing (Note: Canoe sprint in 1948 and Canoe slalom in 1972.)	1948
Luge	**1964**
Volleyball (Note: Indoor volleyball in 1964 and Beach volleyball in 1996.)	**1964**
Shooting	1968 (Note: Events marked as "Men's" were nominally open events from 1968 until 1980 (and in shotgun events until 1992), although very few women competed in them.)
Basketball (Note: Basketball in 1976 and 3x3 basketball in 2020.)	1976
Handball (Note: Indoor handball in 1976. Field handball: Never.)	1976
Rowing (Note: Rowing in 1976 and Coastal rowing in 2028.)	1976
Field hockey	1980
Cycling (Note: Road cycling in 1984, Track cycling in 1988, Mountain biking in 1996, BMX racing in 2008 and BMX freestyle in 2020.)	1984
Table tennis	**1988**
Biathlon	1992
Badminton	**1992**
Judo	1992
Football	1996
Baseball and softball (Note: Softball in 1996. Baseball: Never.)	1996
Curling	1998
Ice hockey	1998
Modern pentathlon	2000
Taekwondo	**2000**
Triathlon	**2000**
Weightlifting	2000
Bobsleigh (Note: Bobsleigh in 2002 and Skeleton in 2002.)	2002
Wrestling (Note: Freestyle wrestling in 2004. Greco-Roman wrestling: Never.)	2004
Boxing	2012
Rugby (Note: Rugby sevens in 2016. Rugby union: Never.)	2016
Karate	**2020**
Skateboarding	**2020**
Sport climbing	**2020**
Surfing	**2020**
Breaking	**2024**
Ski mountaineering (Note: Sprint in 2026 and Individual in 2030.)	**2026**
Cricket	2028
Flag football	**2028**
Lacrosse (Note: Lacrosse sixes in 2028. Field lacrosse: Never.)	2028
Squash	**2028**

The discontinued Olympic sports of basque pelota, jeu de paume, military patrol, polo, rackets, roque and tug of war never featured official women participation, although basque pelota included a women's event when it was featured as a demonstration sport in 1992.

== Current gender differences ==
=== Alpine skiing ===
The men and women ski different distances and sometimes at different venues, for example in the 2026 Winter Olympics for the downhill events the men's course (Stelvio) was 3,442 metres in length, with a vertical drop of 1,023 metres from a starting elevation of 2,268 metres above sea level. The women's course (Olimpia delle Tofane) was 2,572 metres in length, with a vertical drop of 760 metres from a starting elevation of 2,320 metres above sea level.

=== Artistic gymnastics ===
Men have six apparatus and women only have four, with both sharing floor and vault but men having pommel horse, parallel bars, rings and horizontal bar and women having balance beam and uneven bars. Women's floor routines are up to 90 seconds long whilst men's floor routines are up to 70 seconds long and don't feature music. Women are scored using more artistic components than men. In the vault, the vaulting table is set higher for men at 1.35 metres and lower for women at 1.25 metres. Despite the different number of events, an equal number of men and women participate in this discipline.

=== Artistic swimming ===
The duet event is women-only. The 2024 Games introduced men's participation in the artistic swimming team event with a maximum of two male members per eight-person team, although no men have competed yet.

=== Athletics ===
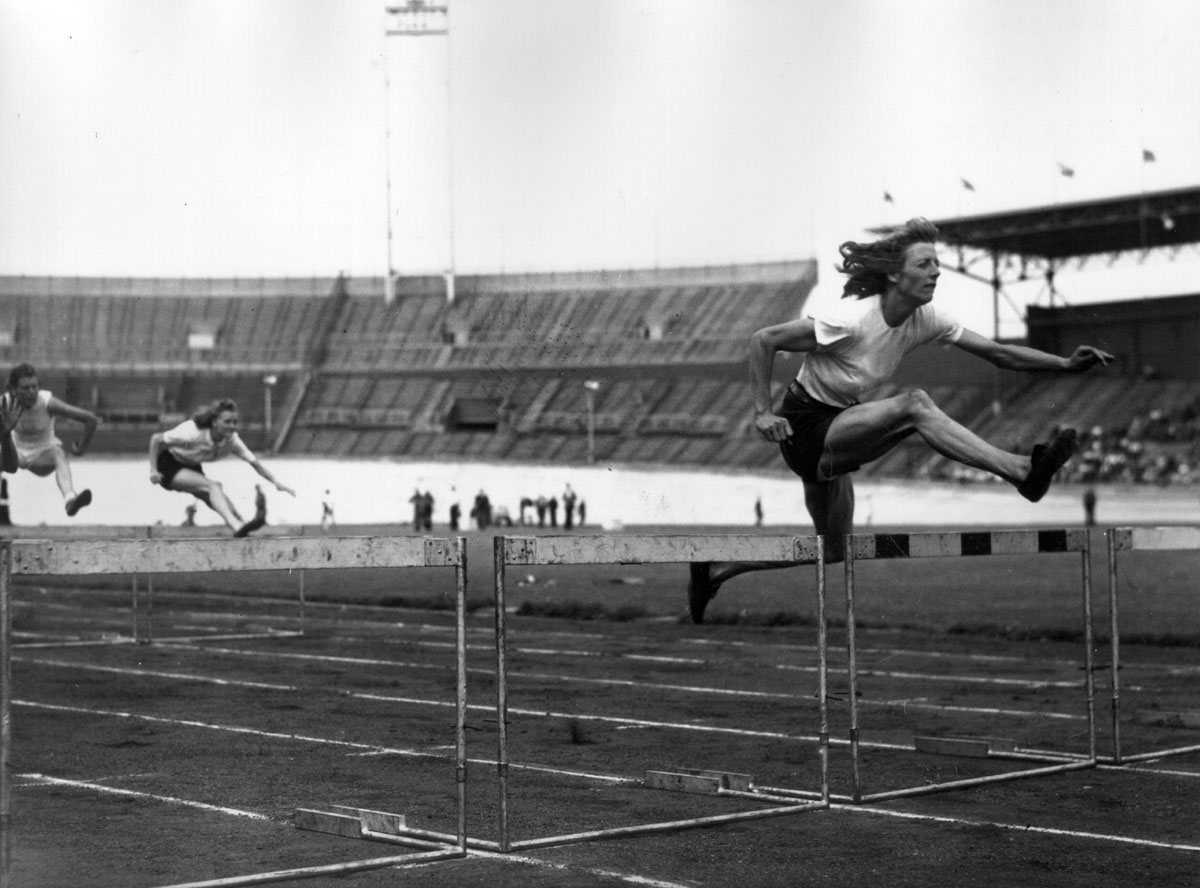
Fanny Blankers-Koen made history at the 1948 London Olympics by winning four gold medals in track and field (100m, 200m, 80m hurdles, and 4 × 100 m relay).

In combined events at the Olympics, women compete in the seven-event heptathlon but men compete in three more events in the decathlon. A women's pentathlon was held from 1964 to 1980, before being expanded to the heptathlon.

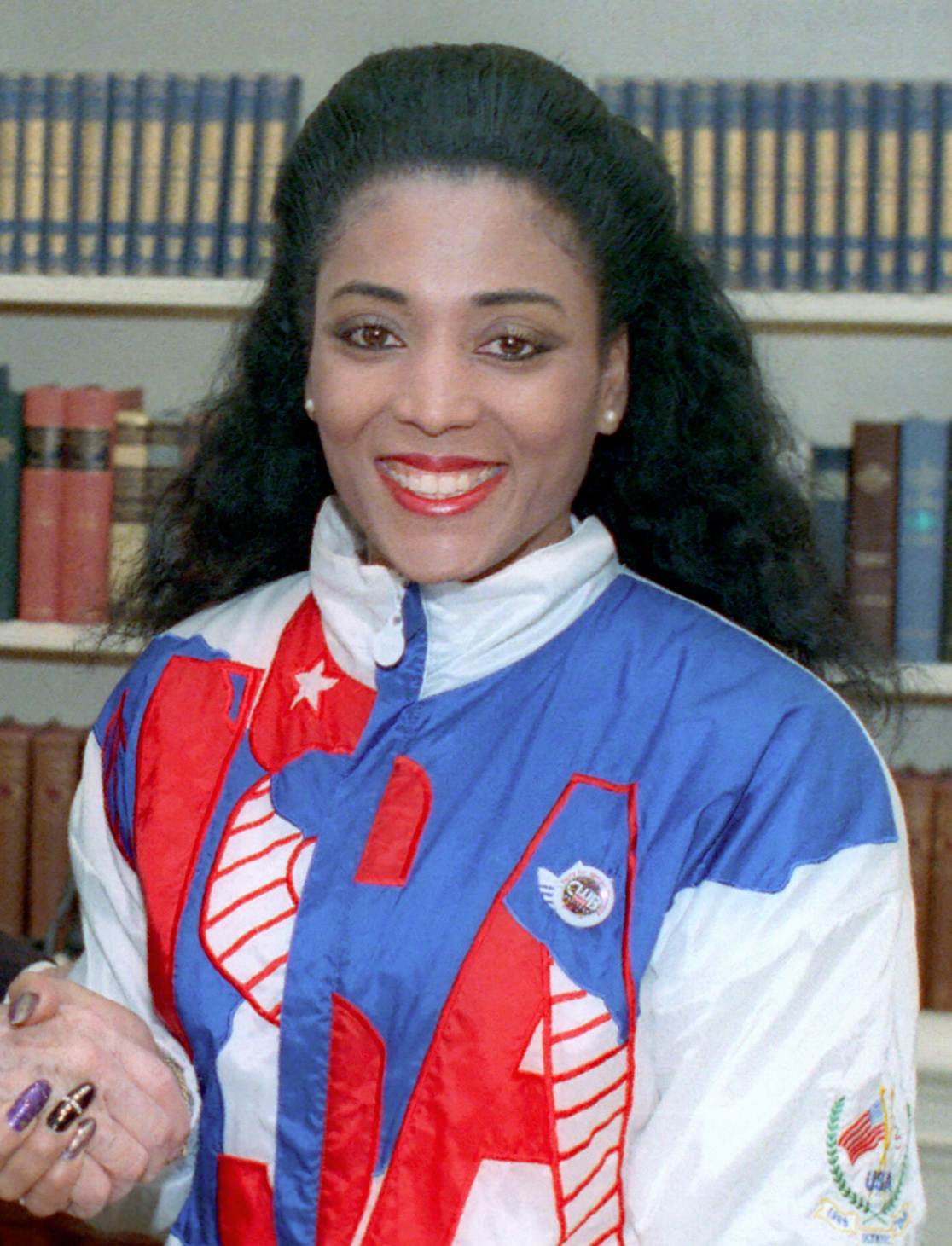
Florence Griffith Joyner known as "Flo-Jo," athlete who set world records in the 100m and 200m sprints at the 1988 Seoul Olympics.

In sprint hurdles at the Olympics, men compete in the 110 metres hurdles, while women cover 100 metres. Women ran 80 metres up to the 1968 Olympics; this was extended to 100 metres in 1961, albeit on a trial basis, the new distance of 100 metres became official in 1969. Both men and women clear a total of ten hurdles during the races and both genders take three steps between the hurdles at elite level.

Historically, women competed over 3000 metres until this was matched to the men's 5000 metres event in 1996. Similarly, women competed in a 10 kilometres race walk in 1992 and 1996 before this was changed to the standard men's distance of 20 km. The expansion of the women's athletics programme to match the men's was a slow one. Triple jump was added in 1996, hammer throw and pole vault in 2000, and steeplechase in 2008. The last difference remaining (excluding the heptathlon/decathlon, the distance in the hurdles events, hurdle and steeplechase barrier heights, the distance between the take-off line and landing area in triple jump and throwing implement differences in discus throw, hammer throw, javelin throw and shot put which still persist) was the men-only 50 kilometres race walk event, which was removed from the Olympics in 2024 due to lack of female participation and replaced with the marathon race walk mixed relay, which was itself removed after 2024.

=== Baseball ===
The baseball tournament is only open to men.

=== Basketball ===
Women use smaller basketballs than men (size 6 rather than size 7).

=== Beach volleyball ===
The men's net is set to a height of 2.43 metres. The women's net is set lower, at 2.24 metres.

=== Biathlon ===
Women compete at shorter distances than men in all events apart from in the mixed relay. The men's individual event is 20 kilometres whereas the women's is 15 kilometres, the men's sprint is 10 kilometres and the women's is 7.5 kilometres, the pursuit is 12.5 kilometres for men and 10 kilometres for women, the mass start is 15 kilometres for men and 12.5 kilometres for women, and the men's relay is 4 x 7.5 kilometres whereas the women's relay is 4 x 6 kilometres.

=== Bobsleigh ===
The monobob event is only open to women and the four-man bobsleigh event has no equivalent for women. The two-woman bobsleigh event is held with lighter, slightly smaller sleds than the two-men bobsleigh event with a lower minimum weight requirement. The two-man event has a maximum combined weight (crew, sled and equipment) of 390 kilograms and the two-woman event has a maximum combined weight of 340 kilograms.

=== Boxing ===
When women's boxing was first introduced to the Olympics in 2012, women competed in three weight categories against 10 for men. Two male categories were removed in 2020 while two female categories were added. In 2024, another weight class was added to women's boxing and one was removed from the men's. Currently men compete in seven events and women compete in six with another women's event planned to be added in 2028 to achieve gender parity in the sport. The weight classes in 2028 will be 55 kg, 60 kg, 65 kg, 70 kg, 80 kg, 90 kg and +90 kg for the men and 51 kg, 54 kg, 57 kg, 60 kg, 65 kg, 70 kg and 75 kg for the women. Women are required to wear headguards whilst men were last required to do so in 2016. Women wear 10 ounce boxing gloves for all weight classes and men wear twelve ounce gloves from 70 kg upwards.

=== Canoe sprint ===
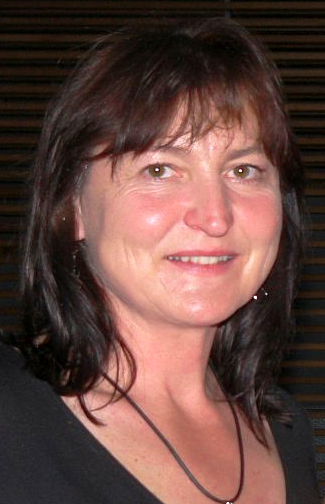
Birgit Fischer competed in various canoeing events and is one of the most successful Olympians in terms of gold medals won.

Only women can compete in the C-1 200 metres event and K-1 500 metres event and only men can compete in the C-1 1000 metres event and the K-1 1000 metres event.

=== Figure skating ===
The multiplier applied to program component scores is 1.33 for the women's short program, 1.67 for the men's short program, 2.67 for the women's free skate and 3.33 for the men's free skate. Quadruple jumps are not allowed in the women's short program and they have different spin requirements. In 2030, a new women's synchro9 event (a synchronised skating event where 9 teams of 9 skaters plus one reserve each will compete against each other) will be introduced without an equivalent men's event.

=== Football ===
In Olympic football, there is no age restriction for women, whereas the men's teams field under-23 teams with a maximum of three over-aged players. The men's tournament contains sixteen teams whereas the women's tournament contains twelve teams. This will be reversed in 2028 due to the growing popularity of women's football.

=== Freestyle wrestling ===
Women are not allowed to use neck holds (double nelsons). The weight classes are 57 kg, 65 kg, 74 kg, 86 kg, 97 kg and 125 kg for the men and 50 kg, 53 kg, 57 kg, 62 kg, 68 kg and 76 kg for the women.

=== Golf ===
Women play shorter total distances than men as they play from forward tees, reducing the overall course length by roughly 800 yards compared to the men's tees.

=== Greco-Roman wrestling ===
Women are excluded from Greco-Roman wrestling, with men competing in six events.

=== Handball ===
Women use smaller balls than men (size 2 rather than size 3).

=== Ice hockey ===
The men's teams can have up to 25 players whereas the women's teams can have 23. From 2030, women's teams will also have rosters of 25 so there will be 300 male players and 250 female players. This is because women compete in a 10-team tournament, whereas men compete in a 12-team tournament. Body checking is not allowed in women's ice hockey.

=== Indoor volleyball ===
The men's net is set to a height of 2.43 metres. The women's net is set lower, at 2.24 metres.

=== Judo ===
The weight classes are 60 kg, 66 kg, 73 kg, 81 kg, 90 kg, 100 kg and +100 kg for the men and 48 kg, 52 kg, 57 kg, 63 kg, 70 kg, 78 kg and +78 kg for the women.

=== Luge ===
In singles, men start at a higher point on the track, resulting in a longer course and higher top speeds. Women’s singles start from a lower point. Men are required to have a minimum weight of 90 kilograms while women must weigh at least 75 kilograms. If below this, they are allowed to carry extra weight.

=== Mountain biking ===
Women race 1-2 fewer laps than men.

=== Nordic combined ===
Only men are allowed to compete in the three Nordic combined events. The discipline of Nordic combined was removed from the Olympic programme following the 2026 Winter Olympic Games.

=== Rhythmic gymnastics ===
Only women are allowed to compete in the two rhythmic gymnastics events.

=== Road cycling ===
Since 1984, when women's cycling events were introduced, the women's road race has been approximately 140 kilometres to the men's approximately 250 kilometres, with the men's course also having a higher elevation. The time trials were equalised in 2024.

=== Sailing ===
For the men's single-handed dinghy event, the equipment used is the ILCA 7 while the women use the ILCA 6. For the men's skiff event, the equipment used is the 49er while the women use the 49erFX.

=== Shooting ===
Women are excluded from the 25 metre rapid fire pistol event. Men are excluded from the 25 metre pistol event. In the 50 metre rifle three positions event, men's rifles can weigh up to 8 kilograms, while women's rifles are capped at 6.5 kilograms.

=== Short track speed skating ===
Women compete in the 3000 metre relay whereas men compete in the 5000 metre relay.

=== Skeleton ===
Men can use sleds up to 45 kilograms with a maximum combined athlete and sled weight of 120 kilograms and women can use sleds up to 38 kilograms with a maximum combined athlete and sled weight of 102 kilograms.

=== Ski jumping ===
There are three men-only events but only two women-only events as there is no women's super team event equivalent to its male counterpart. A women's super team event will be introduced in 2030.

=== Softball ===
The softball tournament is only open to women.

=== Speed skating ===
Women compete in the 3000 metres whereas men compete in the 10,000 metres.

=== Sport climbing ===
Men and women climb different boulder and lead routes.

=== Taekwondo ===
The weight classes are 58 kg, 68 kg, 80 kg and +80 kg for the men and 49 kg, 57 kg, 67 kg and +67 kg for the women.

=== Track cycling ===
Women race fewer laps than men in two events. In the Madison, women race 120 laps (30 kilometres) whilst men race 200 laps (50 kilometres). In the omnium points race, women race 80 laps (20 kilometres) whilst men race 100 laps (25 kilometres).

=== Water polo ===
The men's tournament contains twelve teams whereas the women's tournament contains ten teams. The women's tournament will also feature twelve teams from 2028. Men’s matches are played in a 30 metre pool, whereas women’s matches are played in a slightly shorter 25 metre pool, though both are 20 metres wide. Men also use a larger ball than the women.

=== Weightlifting ===
Men use a 20 kg barbell, while women use a 15 kg barbell. Men's bars are 220 cm long with a 28mm diameter, whereas women's bars are 201 cm long with a 25 mm diameter. Men's bars feature centre knurling for better grip during cleans, while women's bars do not. The weight classes for the 2028 Olympics will be 65 kg, 75 kg, 85 kg, 95 kg, 110 kg and +110 kg for the men and 53 kg, 61 kg, 69k g, 77 kg, 86 kg and +86 kg for the women.

== Gender equality ==
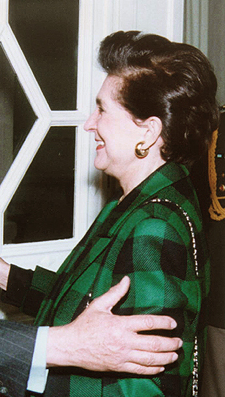
In 1981 Flor Isava Fonseca and Finnish Pirjo Häggman were the first women to be elected to the International Olympic Committee. She was the first woman to serve on the executive board in 1990.

Historically, female athletes have been treated, portrayed and looked upon differently from their male counterparts. As the 20th century was coming to an end, Georgia state legislators suggested the Equity in Sports Act (House Bill 1308). Not only was this bill presented to strengthen the Title IX policies but also bring awareness to women sports. Later on in 2004, California passed the Fair Play Act which required gender equity, opportunities, facilities, and more. As of 2024, more than 3 million girls participate in high school sports, compared to fewer than 300,000 girls before the law was passed.

In the early days of the Olympic Games, many NOCs sent fewer female competitors because they would incur the cost of a chaperone, which was not necessary for the male athletes. Female athletes continue to be treated as less than compared to male athletes. For example, in 2012, the Japan women's national football team travelled to the Games in economy class, while the men's team travelled in business class. Although women competed in all sports at the summer Olympics by 2012, there were still 39 events that were not open to women. Men have to compete in longer and tougher events, such as the road race in cycling. A study done by "Women in International Elite Athletics: Gender (in)equality and National Participation", tested the effect of macro-social gender equality on the ability of women to pursue sports. There was also the idea that if the World Sports organisation made more pushes for equality campaigns, there would be a correlation in the number of women who play these sports.

== Sports Commentators ==
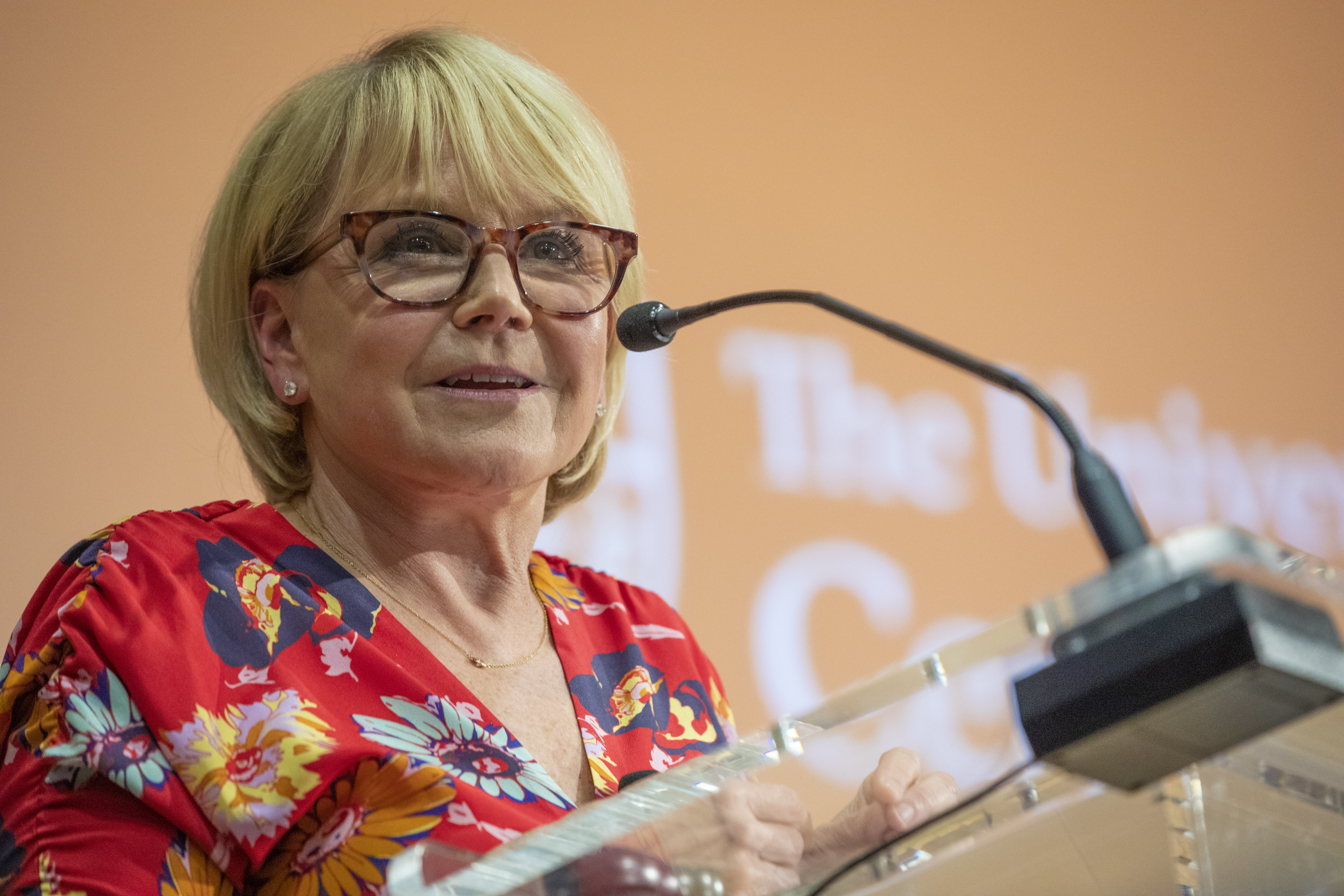
Andrea Joyce has covered numerous Olympic Games for NBC Sports.

Historically, coverage and inclusion of women's team sports in the Olympics has been limited. Commentators are more likely to refer to female athletes using "non-sporting terminology" than they are for men. A 2016 study published by Cambridge University Press found that women were more likely to be described using physical features, age, marital status and aesthetics than men were, as opposed to sport-related adjectives and descriptions. The same study found that women were also more likely to be referred to as "girls" than men were to be called "boys" in commentary. In addition, women were twice as likely to be referred to as 'ladies', compared to 'gentlemen' who are frequently referred to by the neutral term 'men'. This disparity in the quality of coverage for women's Olympic sports has been attributed to the fact that 90% of sports journalists are male.

The most common adjectives sports commentators used to describe returning female Olympians during the 2016 Olympics were 'aged', 'older', 'pregnant', and 'married' or 'un-married', while for male Olympians, 'fastest', 'strong', 'big', 'real' and 'great' were the most common adjectives.

Coverage of women's sports has typically been lower than men's. From 1992 to 1998, American women have always had less raw clock time when being covered on television. Compared to American men, the women have only had 44, 47, and 40 percent of the Olympic television coverage, respectively.

== Role of the International Olympic Committee ==
International Olympic Committee logo.

The International Olympic Committee (IOC) was created by Pierre, Baron de Coubertin, in 1894 and is now considered "the supreme authority of the Olympic movement". Its headquarters are located in Lausanne, Switzerland. The title of supreme authority of the Olympic movement consists of many different duties, which include promoting Olympic values, maintaining the regular celebration of the Olympic Games, and supporting any organization that is connected with the Olympic movement.

Some of the Olympic values that the IOC promotes are practicing sport ethically, eliminating discrimination from sports, encouraging women's involvement in sport, fighting the use of drugs in sport, and blending sport, culture, and education. The IOC supports these values by creating different commissions that focus on a particular area. These commissions hold conferences throughout the year where different people around the world discuss ideas and ways to implement the Olympic values into the lives of people internationally. The commissions also have the responsibility of reporting their findings to the President of the IOC and its executive board. The President has the authority to assign members to different commissions based on the person's interests and specialties.

The first two female IOC members were the Venezuelan Flor Isava-Fonseca and the Finnish Pirjo Häggman and were co-opted as IOC members in 1981.

The IOC can contain up to 115 members, and currently, the members of the IOC come from 79 countries. The IOC is considered a powerful authority throughout the world as it creates policies that become standards for other countries to follow in the sporting arena.

In 2011 only 20 of the 106 members of the IOC were women. In 2023, this was 44 of 107 members - 41.1%.

=== Women in Sport Commission ===
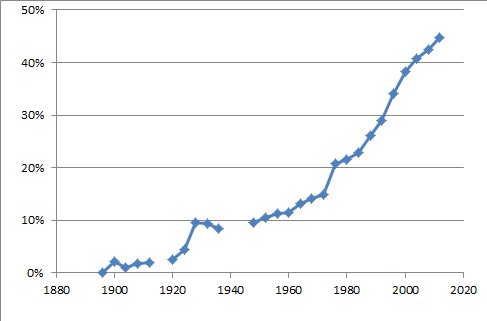
Women participants at each Summer Olympic Games as a percentage of all participants.

A goal of the IOC is to encourage these traditional countries to support women's participation in sport because two of the IOC's Olympic values that it must uphold are ensuring the lack of discrimination in sports and promoting women's involvement in sport. The commission that was created to promote the combination of these values was the Women in Sport Commission. This commission declares its role as "advis[ing] the IOC Executive Board on the policy to deploy in the area of promoting women in sport". This commission did not become fully promoted to its status until 2004, and it meets once a year to discuss its goals and implementations. This commission also presents a Women and Sport Trophy annually which recognizes a woman internationally who has embodied the values of the IOC and who has supported efforts to increase women's participation in sport at all levels. This trophy is supposed to symbolize the IOC's commitment to honoring those who are beneficial to gender equality in sports.

Another way that the IOC tried to support women's participation in sport was allowing women to become members. In 1990, Flor Isava Fonseca became the first woman elected to the executive board of the IOC. The first American woman member of the IOC was Anita DeFrantz, who became a member in 1986 and in 1992 began chairing the prototype of the IOC Commission on Women in Sport. DeFrantz not only worked towards promoting gender equality in sports, but she also wanted to move toward gender equality in the IOC so women could be equally represented. She believed that without equal representation in the IOC that women's voices would not get an equal chance to be heard. She was instrumental in creating a new IOC policy that required the IOC membership to be composed of at least 20 percent women by 2005. She also commissioned a study conducted in 1989 and again in 1994 that focused on the difference between televised coverage of men's and women's sports. Inequality still exists in this area, but her study was deemed to be eye opening to how substantial the problem was and suggested ways to increase reporting on women's sporting events. DeFrantz is now head of the Women in Sport Commission.

The IOC failed in its policy requiring 20 percent of IOC members to be women by 2005. By June 2012, the policy had still not been achieved, with only 20 out of 106 IOC members women, an 18.8 percent ratio. Only 4 percent of National Olympic Committees have female presidents.

== Impact of the Women's World Games ==
=== Background ===
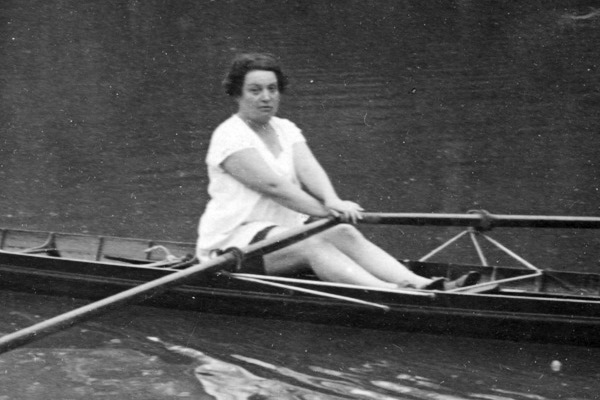
Alice Milliat, the founder of the IWSF and Women's World Games.

In 1919, French translator and amateur rower, Alice Milliat initiated talks with the IOC and International Association of Athletics Federations with the goal of having women's athletics included at the 1924 Summer Olympics. After her request was refused, she organised the first "Women's Olympiad", hosted in Monte Carlo. This would become the precursor to the first Women's World Games. The event was seen as a protest against the IOC's refusal to include females in athletics and a message to their President Pierre de Coubertin who was opposed to women at the Olympics. Milliat went on to found the International Women's Sports Federation who organized the first Women's World Games.

=== The Games ===
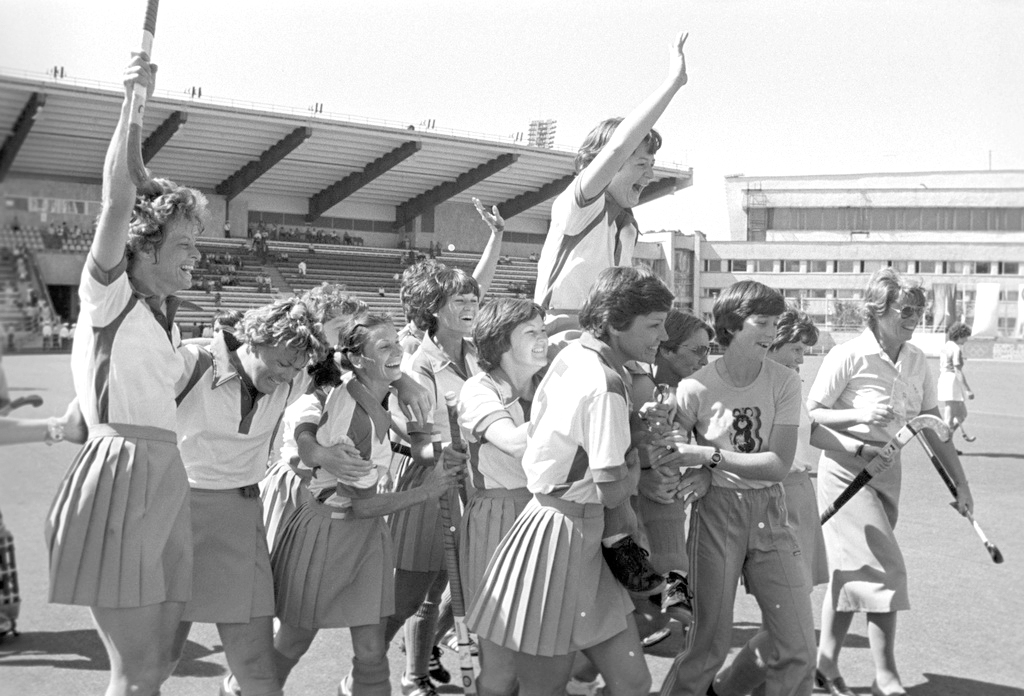
The Zimbabwean women's field hockey team celebrating a 4–0 win over Poland at the 1980 Games.

The first ever "Women's Olympic Games" were held in Paris in 1922. The athletes competed in eleven events: 60 metres, 100 yards, 300 metres, 1000 metres, 4 x 110 yards relay, Hurdling 100 yards, high jump, long jump, standing long jump, javelin and shot put. 20,000 people attended the Games and 18 world records were set. Despite the successful outcome of the event, the IOC still refused to include women's athletics at the 1924 Summer Olympics. On top of this, the IOC and IAAF objected to the use of the term "Olympic" in the event, so the IWSF changed the name of the event to the Women's World Games for the 1926 version. The 1926 Women's World Games would be held in Gothenburg, Sweden. The discus throw was added to the programme. These Games were also attended by 20,000 spectators and finally convinced the IOC to allow women to compete in the Olympics in some athletics events. The IOC let women compete in 100 metres, 800 metres, 4 × 100 metres relay, high jump and discus throw in 1928. There would be two more editions of the Women's World Games, 1930 in Prague and 1934 in London. The IWSF was forced to fold after the Government of France pulled funding in 1936. Pierre de Coubertin, founder of the International Olympic Committee, was quoted with saying "I do not approve of the participation of women in public competitions. In the Olympic Games, their primary role should be to crown the victors."

== See also ==
- 20th century women's fitness culture
- Olympic games
- Women's sports
- Women's professional sports
- Egyptian women's participation in the Summer Olympics
- Emirati women's participation in the Summer Olympics
- LGBT issues at the Olympic and Paralympic Games
- List of LGBT Olympians
- Sex verification and intersex athletes at the Olympic Games

== Bibliography ==
- Australian Sport Commission; Office of the Status of Women (1985). Women, Sport and the Media. Australian Government Publishing Services. ISBN 978-0-644-04155-3.
- "Wickenheiser signs with Swedish men's club". CBC Sports. The Canadian Press. July 22, 2008.
- "Canadians cheer new Olympic sports". Waterloo Region Record. The Canadian Press. July 27, 1992.
- Community, Sport and Cultural Development – Province of British Columbia (2011). "BC ATHLETE ASSISTANCE PROGRAM 2010 – 2011 Provincial Sport Organization Guidelines, Policies and Procedures" (PDF). Archived from the original (PDF) on April 9, 2011.
- Crocombe, R G (2007). Asia in the Pacific Islands : replacing the West. CIPS Publications, University of the South Pacific. ISBN 978-982-02-0388-4. OCLC 213886360.
- Dyer, K F (1982). Challenging the Men, The social biology of female sporting achievement. University of Queensland Press. ISBN 978-0-7022-1652-7.
- First National Bank (2010). "School Sport LOCAL SPORT INITIATIVES". Archived from the original on December 30, 2010.
- Howell, Reet; Howell, Max (1988). Aussie Gold, A celebration of every Australian Olympic Gold Medal since 1896. Melbourne, Victoria: Brooks-Waterloo. ISBN 978-0-86440-680-4.
- "The sports on the Olympic programme" (PDF). International Olympic Committee. February 2008. Archived from the original (PDF) on August 22, 2011.
- International Softball Federation. "The History of Softball". International Softball Federation. Archived from the original on December 12, 2006.
- International Softball Federation (September 5, 2006). "USA Wins 2006 Women's World Championship". International Softball Federation. Archived from the original on March 4, 2007.
- International Softball Federation (August 4, 2002). "Four Teams Qualify for 2004 Olympic Games". International Softball Federation. Archived from the original on October 25, 2006.
- Cooky, Cheryl; Messner, Michael; Musto, Michela (June 5, 2015). ""It's Dude Time!": A Quarter Century of Excluding Women's Sports in Televised News and Highlight Shows". Communication & Sport. 3 (3): 261–287. doi:10.1177/2167479515588761.
- Jones, Diane (February 2004). "Half the Story? Olympic Women on the ABC News Online" (PDF). Media International Australia Incorporating Culture and Policy. 110 (110): 132–146. doi:10.1177/1329878X0411000114. S2CID 54039376. Archived (PDF) from the original on April 9, 2011.
- Maraniss, David (2008). Rome 1960. New York: Simon and Schuster. ISBN 978-1-4165-3407-5.
- Massoa, Prisca; Fasting, Kari (December 2002). "Women and sport in Tanzania". In Pfister, Gertrud; Hartmann-Tews, Ilse (eds.). Sport and Women: Social Issues in International Perspective. International Society for Comparative Physical Education & Sport. Routledge. ISBN 978-0-415-24628-6.
- "An Agreement By Nagano Games". The New York Times. November 29, 1992.
- Ormsby, Mary (November 18, 1992). "Women 's hockey gets approval for '98". Toronto Star.
- Pfister, Gertrud; Hartmann-Tews, Ilse (December 2002). "Women's inclusion in sport, International and comparative findings". In Pfister, Gertrud; Hartmann-Tews, Ilse (eds.). Sport and Women: Social Issues in International Perspective. International Society for Comparative Physical Education & Sport. Routledge. pp. 267–280. ISBN 978-0-415-24628-6.
- Singapore National Olympic Council. "The 117th IOC Session in Singapore - A Summary". Singapore National Olympic Council. Archived from the original on July 25, 2008.
- sports-reference.com (2006). "Ice Hockey at the 2006 Torino Winter Games: Women's Ice Hockey". sports-reference.com. Archived from the original on April 18, 2020.
- Symons, Carol; Hemphill, Dennis (November 2006). "Netball and transgender participation". In Caudwell, Jayne (ed.). Sport, sexualities and queer/theory. Routledge Critical Studies in Sport. Routledge. pp. 122–124. ISBN 978-0-415-36761-5.
- Yen, Yi-Wyn (February 20, 2008). "Canada's leading star". Sports Illustrated. Archived from the original on March 12, 2006.
