= Tadeusz Radwan =

Polish luger (1945–2003)

Medal record

Luge

European Championships
Bronze medal – third place	1971 Imst	Men's doubles

Tadeusz Radwan (June 27, 1945 – October 25, 2003) was a Polish luger born in Koziniec. He competed in the late 1960s and early 1970s. He won the bronze medal in the men's doubles event at the 1971 FIL European Luge Championships in Imst, Austria.

Radwan also finished 22nd in the men's singles event at the 1968 Winter Olympics in Grenoble. He died in Bielsko-Biała in October 2003.
