= Barbara Piecha =

Polish luger

Personal information
- Full name: Barbara Piecha-Gawior
- Born: 4 March 1949 (age 77) Katowice, Śląskie, Poland
- Height: 164 cm (5 ft 5 in)
- Weight: 70 kg (154 lb)

Sport
- Club: GKS Katowice
Medal record
Luge
Representing Poland
World Championships
Gold medal – first place	1970 Königssee	Women's singles
Bronze medal – third place	1971 Olang	Women's singles
European Championships
Bronze medal – third place	1971 Imst	Women's singles

Barbara Piecha (born 4 March 1949) is a Polish luger who competed during the early 1970s. She was born in Katowice. She won two medals in the women's singles event at the FIL World Luge Championships with a gold in 1970 and a bronze in 1971. She competed at the 1972 Winter Olympics and the 1976 Winter Olympics. Piecha also won a bronze medal in the women's singles at the 1971 FIL European Luge Championships in Imst, Austria.
