= FIL World Luge Championships 1971 =

The FIL World Luge Championships 1971 took place in Olang, Italy.

== Men's singles ==
| Medal | Athlete | Time |
|---|---|---|
| Gold | Karl Brunner (ITA) | |
| Silver | Leonhard Nagenrauft (GER) | |
| Bronze | Josef Feistmantl (AUT) | |

== Women's singles ==
| Medal | Athlete | Time |
|---|---|---|
| Gold | Elisabeth Demleitner (GER) | |
| Silver | Erica Lechner (ITA) | |
| Bronze | Barbara Piecha (POL) | |

== Men's doubles ==
| Medal | Athlete | Time |
|---|---|---|
| Gold | Italy (Paul Hildgartner, Walter Plaikner) | |
| Silver | Austria (Manfred Schmid, Ewald Walch) | |
| Bronze | East Germany (Horst Hömlein, Reinhard Bredlow) | |

== Medal table ==
| Rank | Nation | Gold | Silver | Bronze | Total |
|---|---|---|---|---|---|
| 1 | Italy (ITA) | 2 | 1 | 0 | 3 |
| 2 | West Germany (FRG) | 1 | 1 | 0 | 2 |
| 3 | Austria (AUT) | 0 | 1 | 1 | 2 |
| 4 | East Germany (GDR) | 0 | 0 | 1 | 1 |
| 4 | Poland (POL) | 0 | 0 | 1 | 1 |
| Totals (5 entries) | | 3 | 3 | 3 | 9 |
