= Erika Lechner =

Italian luger

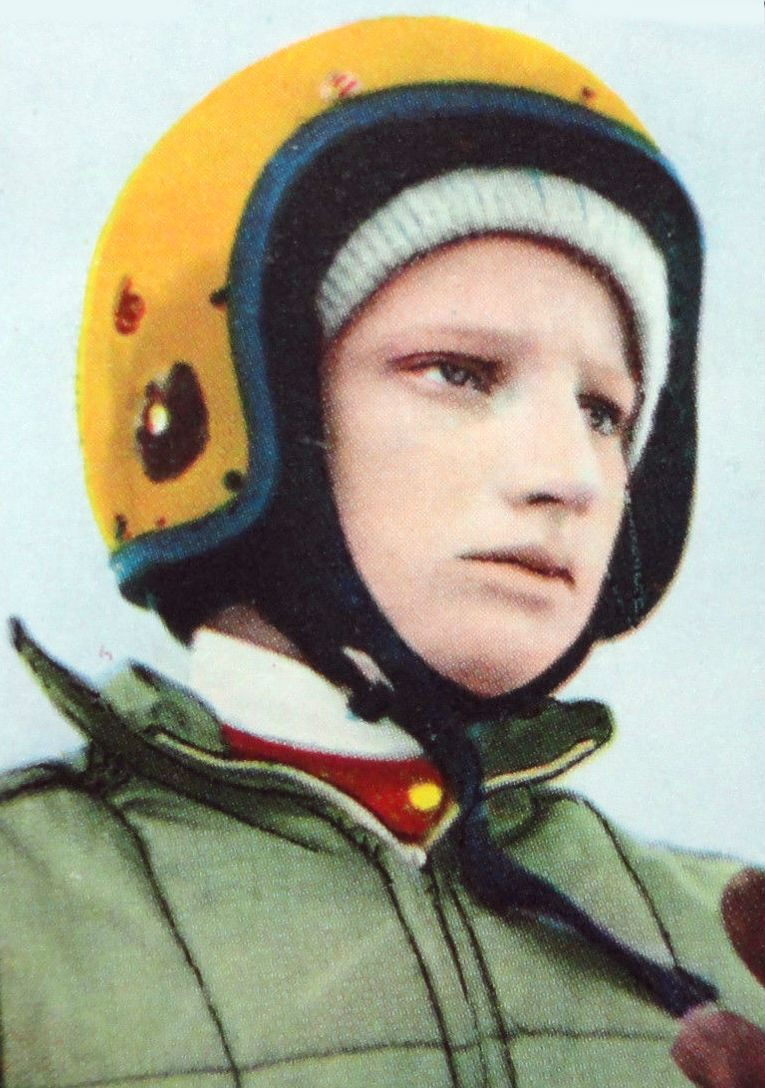
- Erika Lechner

Personal information
- Born: 28 May 1947 (age 79) Bolzano, Italy
Medal record
Luge
Representing Italy
Olympic Games
Gold medal – first place	1968 Grenoble	Women's singles
World Championships
Silver medal – second place	1971 Olang	Women's singles
European Championships
Gold medal – first place	1971 Imst	Women's singles

Erika Lechner (sometimes listed as Erica Lechner, born 28 May 1947 in Bolzano) is an Italian luger who competed during the late 1960s and early 1970s. At the 1968 Winter Olympics in Grenoble, she originally finished third in the women's singles event behind Ortrun Enderlein and Anna-Maria Müller (both from East Germany), but was awarded the gold medal upon the disqualifications of Enderlein, Müller, and Angela Knösel (who finished fourth) when the East Germans were discovered to have their runners being illegally heated.

== Biography ==
Lechner also won the silver medal in the women's singles event at the 1971 FIL World Luge Championships in Olang, Italy. She also won the gold medal in the women's singles event at the 1971 FIL European Luge Championships in Imst, Austria.
