= Janusz Krawczyk =

Polish luger (1949–2021)

Medal record

Luge

European Championships
Bronze medal – third place	1971 Imst	Men's doubles

Janusz Krawczyk (17 December 1949 – 3 April 2021) was a Polish luger who competed in the late 1960s and early 1970s. He won the bronze medal in the men's doubles event at the 1971 FIL European Luge Championships in Imst, Austria.
