= FIL European Luge Championships 1971 =

The FIL European Luge Championships 1971 took place in Imst, Austria for the second time after having previously hosted the championships in 1956. A record four countries won medals at these championships.

== Men's singles ==
Medal	Athlete	Time
Gold	Horst Hörnlein (GDR)	
Silver	Wolfgang Scheidel (GDR)	
Bronze	Manfred Schmid (AUT)	

== Women's singles ==
Medal	Athlete	Time
Gold	Erika Lechner (ITA)	
Silver	Angela Knösel (GDR)	
Bronze	Barbara Piecha (POL)	

== Men's doubles ==
Medal	Athlete	Time
Gold	Italy (Paul Hildgartner, Walter Plaikner)	
Silver	Austria (Manfred Schmid, Ewald Walch)	
Bronze	Poland (Tadeusz Radwan, Janusz Krawczyk)	

== Medal table ==
Rank	Nation	Gold	Silver	Bronze	Total
1	Italy (ITA)	2	0	0	2
2	East Germany (GDR)	1	2	0	3
3	Austria (AUT)	0	1	1	2
4	Poland (POL)	0	0	2	2
Totals (4 entries)		3	3	3	9
