= Leonhard Nagenrauft =

German luger (1938–2017)

Medal record

Luge

World Championships
Silver medal – second place	1971 Olang	Men's singles

European Championships
Gold medal – first place	1967 Königssee	Men's singles
Bronze medal – third place	1972 Königssee	Men's singles

Leonhard Nagenrauft (9 March 1938 in Bischofswiesen – 22 May 2017 in Berchtesgaden) was a West German luger who competed in the late 1960s and early 1970s. He won the silver medal in the men's singles event at the 1971 FIL World Luge Championships in Olang, Italy.

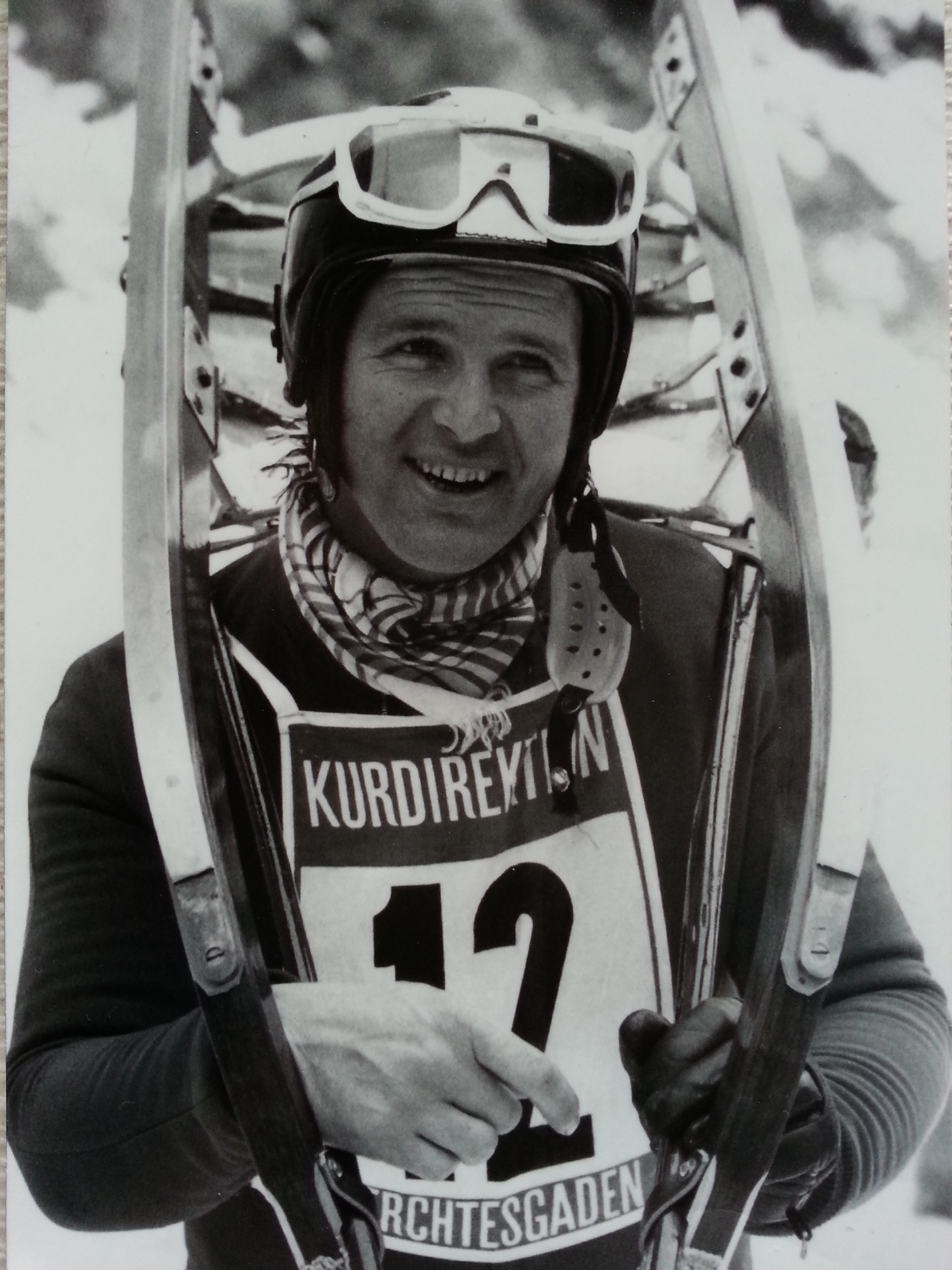
Leonhard Nagenrauft

Nagenrauft also won two medals in the men's singles event at the FIL European Luge Championships with a gold in 1967 and a bronze in 1972.

Nagenrauft also competed in two Winter Olympics, earning his best finish of fifth in the men's singles event at Sapporo in 1972.
