= Pirjo Häggman =

Finnish sprinter (born 1951)

Personal information
- Born: June 8, 1951 (age 75) Sotkamo, Finland
- Height: 1.65 m (5 ft 5 in)
- Weight: 54 kg (119 lb)

Sport
- Sport: Sprint
- Club: Jymy Sotkamo, HKV Helsinki
Medal record
Women's athletics
Representing Finland
European Championships
Silver medal – second place	1974 Rome	4x400m
Summer Universiade
Gold medal – first place	1975 Rome	200m
Gold medal – first place	1975 Rome	400m

Airi Pirjo Maritta Wilmi, formerly Häggman; born 8 June 1951) is a retired Finnish sprinter who specialized in the 400 metres.

Häggman was a member of the Finnish silver medal 4 × 400 m relay team at the 1974 European Athletics Championships in Rome. She competed at the 1972, 1976 and 1980 Summer Olympics. 1976 Häggman finished fourth, missing the bronze medal by 0.01 seconds.

In 1981 Häggman and Venezuelan Flor Isava-Fonseca were the first women to be elected as International Olympic Committee members. She resigned in January 1999 due to the 2002 Winter Olympic bid scandal. Häggman's ex-husband had been working as a paid consultant for the Salt Lake Organizing Committee during the bidding process.
