= Flor Isava Fonseca =

Venezuelan sportswoman and writer (1921–2020)

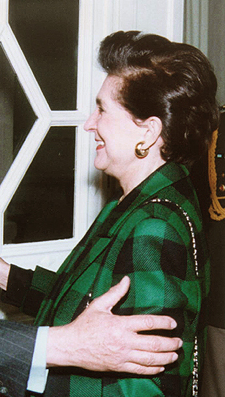
Isava Fonseca in 1997.

Flor Isava Fonseca (20 May 1921 – 25 July 2020) was a Venezuelan sportswoman, journalist, writer and TV presenter as well as prominent member of Venezuelan society.

== Career ==
For a number of years, she was the vice president of the Venezuelan Red Cross, following in the footsteps of her mother, who had been appointed president of this institution years before. She is also an active member of the Venezuelan associated press committee and has devoted much of her time and effort in helping the poor, the blind and prisoners from all over the country. She was twice married, first to Venezuelan media personality Luis Teófilo Núñez Arismendi, with whom she had three children and afterwards to Domingo Lucca Romero.

In 1981 Isava-Fonseca and Finnish Pirjo Häggman were the first women to be elected to the International Olympic Committee. She was the first woman to serve on the executive board in 1990.
