= Emirati women's participation in the Summer Olympics =

Emirati women's participation in the Summer Olympics began at the 2008, 24 years after the country's first appearance at the Games; men had first participated at the 1984 Summer Olympics in Los Angeles. In 2008, Latifa Al Maktoum competed in equestrian events and carried the UAE flag during the opening ceremony, while Maitha Al Maktoum represented the country in taekwondo.

Four years later, at the London 2012 Olympics, the presence of Emirati women continued to grow. Khadija Mohammed took part in weightlifting, becoming the first female weightlifter from the UAE to compete at the Olympics. Betlhem Desalegn Belayneh also represented the nation in athletics, further solidifying the role of women in the UAE's Olympic journey.

Also there were 14 athletes representing UAE at Paris 2024 Olympic Games, seven of them women.

== Beijing 2008 ==
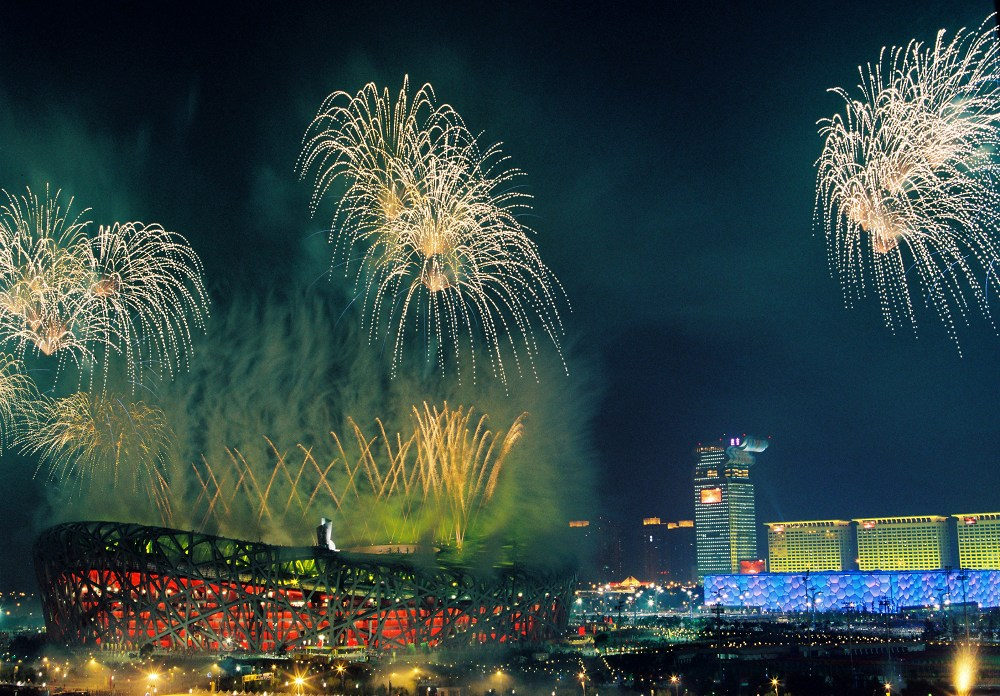
UAE delegation participating in the 2008 Beijing Olympics at the opening ceremony. Latifa Al Maktoum is seen leading the delegation, carrying the UAE flag

Latifa Al Maktoum carried the UAE delegation's flag in this session.

=== Taekwondo ===
sportswoman	Event	Round of 16	Quarter-finals	Semi-final	Rehabilitation	bronze medal	Final	
sportswoman	Event	contender Result	contender Result	contender Result	contender Result	contender Result	contender Result	Ranking
Maitha bint Mohammed Al Maktoum	Less than 67 kg	Hwang Kyung-seon (KOR) 1–5	Did not qualify		Sandra Saric (CRO) 0–4	Did not qualify		

=== Equestrianism ===
Show jumping

sportswoman	horse	Event	Playoffs								Final					total	
sportswoman	horse	Event	Round 1		Round 2			Round 3			Round A		Round B			total	
sportswoman	horse	Event	Faults	Ranking	Faults	total	Ranking	Faults	total	Ranking	Faults	Ranking	Faults	total	Ranking	Faults	Ranking
Latifa bint Ahmed Al Maktoum	Kalska di Semeli	individual	11	61	15	26	54	Did not qualify								26	54

== London 2012 ==
Khadija Mohammed was the youngest athlete on the entire UAE delegation at 17 years and 46 days old.

== See also ==
- United Arab Emirates at the Olympics
- Egyptian women's participation in the Summer Olympics
