= Angela Knösel =

German luger (born 1949)

Medal record

Women's Luge

Representing East Germany

European Championships
Silver medal – second place	1970 Hammarstrand	Women's singles
Silver medal – second place	1971 Imst	Women's singles

Angela Knösel (born 29 August 1949) is a German luger who competed for East Germany in the late 1960s and early 1970s. She won two silver medals in the women's singles event at the FIL European Luge Championships (1970, 1971).

At the 1968 Winter Olympics in Grenoble, she initially finished fourth after the competition was halted to three runs due to bad weather, but was disqualified with her East German teammates Ortrun Enderlein and Anna-Maria Müller when it was discovered that they had illegally heated their runners (which are used to guide the luge on the ice as it maneuvers down the track). Enderlein, who was leading at the time, and Müller, who was second, were stripped of their respective medals as a result.
