= 2006–07 Luge World Cup =

International luge competition

The 2006–07 Luge World Cup was a multi race series over a season for luge. The season started on 18 November 2006 and ended on 18 February 2007. The World Cup is organised by the FIL.

== Calendar ==
Date	Place	Disc.	Winner	Second	Third
November 18–19, 2006	(Italy) Cesana	Men's	(Italy) Armin Zöggeler	(Russia) Albert Demtschenko	(Italy) Reinhold Rainer
November 18–19, 2006	(Italy) Cesana	Doubles	Italy; Christian Oberstolz; Patrick Gruber	Germany; Patric Leitner; Alexander Resch	Italy; Gerhard Plankensteiner; Oswald Haselrieder
November 18–19, 2006	(Italy) Cesana	Women's	(Germany) Silke Kraushaar-Pielach	(Germany) Anke Wischnewski	(Germany) Tatjana Hüfner
December 2–3, 2006	(United States) Park City	Men's	(Italy) Armin Zöggeler	(Germany) David Möller	(Switzerland) Stefan Höhener
December 2–3, 2006	(United States) Park City	Doubles	Italy; Christian Oberstolz; Patrick Gruber	Germany; Patric Leitner; Alexander Resch	Italy; Gerhard Plankensteiner; Oswald Haselrieder
December 2–3, 2006	(United States) Park City	Women's	(Germany) Silke Kraushaar-Pielach	(Germany) Sylke Otto	(Germany) Anke Wischnewski
December 9–10, 2006	(Canada) Calgary	Men's	(Germany) David Möller	(Latvia) Mārtiņš Rubenis	(Switzerland) Stefan Höhener
December 9–10, 2006	(Canada) Calgary	Doubles	Germany; Patric Leitner; Alexander Resch	Italy; Christian Oberstolz; Patrick Gruber	Austria; Markus Schiegl; Tobias Schiegl
December 9–10, 2006	(Canada) Calgary	Women's	(Germany) Tatjana Hüfner	(Germany) Silke Kraushaar-Pielach	(Germany) Anke Wischnewski
December 9–10, 2006	(Canada) Calgary	Team Relay	Latvia; Maija Tīruma; Andris Šics; Juris Šics; Mārtiņš Rubenis	Canada; Regan Lauscher; Chris Moffat; Mike Moffat; Jeff Christie	United States; Courtney Zablocki; Mark Grimmette; Brian Martin; Tony Benshoof
December 16–17, 2006	(Japan) Nagano	Men's	(Italy) Armin Zöggeler	(Russia) Albert Demtschenko	(Latvia) Mārtiņš Rubenis
December 16–17, 2006	(Japan) Nagano	Doubles	Germany; Patric Leitner; Alexander Resch	Italy; Christian Oberstolz; Patrick Gruber	Germany; André Florschütz; Torsten Wustlich
December 16–17, 2006	(Japan) Nagano	Women's	(Germany) Silke Kraushaar-Pielach	(Germany) Sylke Otto	(Germany) Tatjana Hüfner
December 16–17, 2006	(Japan) Nagano	Team Relay	Germany; Silke Kraushaar-Pielach; Patric Leitner; Alexander Resch; David Möller	Austria; Nina Reithmayer; Andreas Linger; Wolfgang Linger; Martin Abentung	United States; Ashley Hayden; Mark Grimmette; Brian Martin; Tony Benshoof
January 6–7, 2007	(Germany) Königssee	Men's	(Russia) Albert Demtschenko	(Italy) Armin Zöggeler	(Germany) David Möller
January 6–7, 2007	(Germany) Königssee	Doubles	Germany; Patric Leitner; Alexander Resch	Italy; Christian Oberstolz; Patrick Gruber	Germany; Sebastian Schmidt; Andre Forker
January 6–7, 2007	(Germany) Königssee	Women's	(Germany) Silke Kraushaar-Pielach	(Germany) Tatjana Hüfner	(Germany) Anke Wischnewski
January 6–7, 2007	(Germany) Königssee	Team Relay	Germany; Silke Kraushaar-Pielach; Patric Leitner; Alexander Resch; David Möller	Austria; Nina Reithmayer; Markus Schiegl; Tobias Schiegl; Daniel Pfister	Canada; Regan Lauscher; Chris Moffat; Mike Moffat; Jeff Christie
December 16–17, 2006	(Germany) Oberhof	Men's	(Germany) David Möller	(Germany) Jan Eichhorn	(Italy) Armin Zöggeler
December 16–17, 2006	(Germany) Oberhof	Doubles	Italy; Christian Oberstolz; Patrick Gruber	Germany; Patric Leitner; Alexander Resch	Italy; Gerhard Plankensteiner; Oswald Haselrieder
December 16–17, 2006	(Germany) Oberhof	Women's	(Germany) Silke Kraushaar-Pielach	(Germany) Tatjana Hüfner	(Germany) Corinna Martini
January 20–21, 2007	(Germany) Altenberg	Men's	(Italy) Armin Zöggeler	(Germany) David Möller	(United States) Tony Benshoof
January 20–21, 2007	(Germany) Altenberg	Doubles	Austria; Markus Schiegl; Tobias Schiegl	Germany; Patric Leitner; Alexander Resch	Italy; Christian Oberstolz; Patrick Gruber
January 20–21, 2007	(Germany) Altenberg	Women's	(Germany) Silke Kraushaar-Pielach	(Germany) Natalie Geisenberger	(Germany) Anke Wischnewski
February 2–3, 2007	(Austria) Innsbruck	FIL World Luge Championships 2007			
February 10–11, 2007	(Germany) Winterberg	Men's	(Italy) Armin Zöggeler	(Germany) David Möller	(Russia) Albert Demtschenko
February 10–11, 2007	(Germany) Winterberg	Doubles	Germany; Patric Leitner; Alexander Resch	Italy; Gerhard Plankensteiner; Oswald Haselrieder	Austria; Markus Schiegl; Tobias Schiegl
February 10–11, 2007	(Germany) Winterberg	Women's	(Germany) Tatjana Hüfner	(Germany) Anke Wischnewski	(Ukraine) Natalya Yakuchenko
February 10–11, 2007	(Germany) Winterberg	Team Relay	Germany; Patric Leitner; Alexander Resch; Silke Kraushaar-Pielach; David Möller	Russia; Mikhail Kuzmich; Jury Veselov; Alexandra Rodionova; Albert Demtschenko	Austria; Tobias Schiegl; Markus Schiegl; Nina Reithmayer; Daniel Pfister
February 17–18, 2007	(Latvia) Sigulda	Men's	(Italy) Armin Zöggeler	(Latvia) Mārtiņš Rubenis	(Russia) Albert Demtschenko
February 17–18, 2007	(Latvia) Sigulda	Doubles	Italy; Gerhard Plankensteiner; Oswald Haselrieder	Italy; Christian Oberstolz; Patrick Gruber	Austria; Andreas Linger; Wolfgang Linger
February 17–18, 2007	(Latvia) Sigulda	Women's	(Germany) Silke Kraushaar-Pielach	(Ukraine) Natalya Yakuchenko	(Austria) Nina Reithmayer

== Standings ==
=== Men's singles ===
Pos.	Luger	CES	PAC	CAL	NAG	KÖN	OBH	ALT	WIN	SIG	Points
1.	(Italy) Armin Zöggeler	1	1	4	1	2	3	1	1	1	815
2.	(Germany) David Möller	4	2	1	4	3	1	2	2	4	705
3.	(Italy) Reinhold Rainer	3	4	7	5	9	6	11	5	8	451
4.	(Russia) Albert Demtschenko	2	11	DNF	2	1			3	3	444
5.	(Switzerland) Stefan Höhener	6	3	3	19	4	10	4	10	10	440
6.	(Latvia) Mārtiņš Rubenis	8	23	2	3		4	29	4	2	432
7.	(Germany) Jan Eichhorn	DNF	6	12	6	5	2	5	14	9	394
8.	(United States) Tony Benshoof	21	9	11	10	11	16	3	9	6	347
9.	(Austria) Daniel Pfister	14	14	5	15	8	12	6	8	17	327
10.	(Austria) Martin Abentung	7	7	9	8	18	17	12	17	11	310
11.	(Germany) Johannes Ludwig	11	5	8	11	12	19		7	15	291
12.	(Russia) Viktor Kneib	10	DNF	13	9	13	15	8	13	5	288
13.	(Canada) Jeff Christie	25	12	6	17	10	8	9	DNF	16	264
14.	(Italy) Wilfried Huber	5	15	14	14	17	24	15	15	12	262
15.	(Italy) David Mair	12	16	15	13	22	11	14	16	19	241
16.	(Germany) Felix Loch		10	18		6	9	7		24	211
17.	(Austria) Christian Eigentler	27	8	23	23	16	36	16	12	29	191
18.	(Italy) Patrick Schwienbacher	16	20	17		26	13	18	18	20	182
	(Sweden) Bengt Walden	9	32	24	7	14	22	17			182
20.	(Russia) Kirill Serikov	29	21	20	18	15	20	26	26	14	181

=== Men's doubles ===
Pos.	Luger	CES	PAC	CAL	NAG	KÖN	OBH	ALT	WIN	SIG	Points
1.	(Germany) Patric Leitner / Alexander Resch	2	2	1	1	1	2	2	1	7	786
2.	(Italy) Christian Oberstolz / Patrick Gruber	1	1	2	2	2	1	4	4	2	760
3.	(Italy) Gerhard Plankensteiner / Oswald Haselrieder	3	3	7	9	9	3	3	2	1	589
4.	(Austria) Markus Schiegl / Tobias Schiegl	5	10	3	5	4	5	1	3	5	556
5.	(Austria) Andreas Linger / Wolfgang Linger	4	5	6	4	5	9	6	9	3	478
6.	(United States) Mark Grimmette / Brian Martin	12	4	5	6	7	7	11	6	4	433
7.	(Germany) André Florschütz / Torsten Wustlich	10	6	4	3	6	6	5			371
8.	(Latvia) Juris Šics / Andris Šics	6	8	8	8	12	14	8	11	8	354
9.	(Austria) Peter Penz / Georg Fischler	13	12	10	7	10	10	7	7	13	338
10.	(United States) Chris Moffat / Mike Moffat	11		11	11	8	12	10	8	11	309
11.	(Russia) Mikhail Kuzmich / Jury Veselov	14	13	17	DSQ	11	8	18	10	6	267
12.	(United States) Matt Mortensen / Garon Thorne	8	9	12	10	13	13	13			239
13.	(United States) Preston Griffall / Dan Joye	7	7	15	15	15	11	16			229
14.	(Italy) Hans Peter Fischnaller / Klaus Kofler	15	15	13		16	15	15	13		189
	(Germany) Marcel Lorenz / Christian Baude	16	11	9					5	10	189
	(Ukraine) Andriy Kis / Yuriy Hayduk	20	18	18		18	18	19	15	14	189
17.	(Germany) Sebastian Schmidt / Andre Forker					3	4	9			169
18.	(Slovakia) Ján Harniš / Branislav Regec	17	20	16		21	23	17	DNF	19	155
19.	(Russia) Vladislav Yuzhakov / Vladimir Makhnutin		DSQ	19	14	17		14	21	12	154
	(Czech Republic) Antonín Brož / Lukáš Brož	19	16	20		22	19	20	17		154

=== Women's singles ===
Pos.	Luger	CES	PAC	CAL	NAG	KÖN	OBH	ALT	WIN	SIG	Points
1.	(Germany) Silke Kraushaar-Pielach	1	1	2	1	1	1	1	4	1	845
2.	(Germany) Tatjana Hüfner	3	4	1	3	2	2	4	1	5	685
3.	(Germany) Anke Wischnewski	2	3	3	5	3	4	3	2	9	604
4.	(Austria) Nina Reithmayer		6	6	6	7	8	5	5	3	418
5.	(Ukraine) Natalya Yakuchenko	8	11	18		12	9	9	3	2	364
6.	(United States) Ashley Hayden	13	8	7	4	18	6	11	8	11	361
7.	(Austria) Veronika Halder	6	12	5	7	14	14	6	11	10	359
8.	(Switzerland) Martina Kocher	9	14	9	10	9	5	7	7	15	354
9.	(United States) Erin Hamlin	7	5	14	20	6	11	13	12	20	317
10.	(Germany) Sylke Otto	4	2	21	2	4					310
11.	(Ukraine) Liliya Ludan	11	7	10		13	13	8	14	7	292
12.	(United States) Courtney Zablocki	14	10	11		10	7	12	15	14	266
13.	(Poland) Ewelina Staszulonek	5	14	22	11	8	20	10		21	255
14.	(Latvia) Maija Tīruma	15	20	8	16	15	19	16	13	12	249
15.	(Russia) Alexandra Rodionova	10	18	12	13	DNF	17	28	10	6	244
16.	(Russia) Yulia Anashkina	19	16	13	12	16	16	19	16	13	236
17.	(Canada) Regan Lauscher		9	4	8	11	12				207
18.	(Latvia) Anna Orlova	12	DNF		9		18	14	21	4	202
19.	(United States) Julia Clukey					5	10	15	9	16	181
20.	(Slovakia) Veronika Sabolová	17	19	16		22	22	17	20	19	176

=== Team Relay ===
Pos.	Team	CAL	NAG	KÖN	WIN	Points
1.	Germany		1	1	1	300
2.	Canada	2	4	3	5	270
3.	United States	3	3	4	4	260
4.	Austria		2	2	3	240
5.	Latvia	1	5	DSQ	6	205
6.	Russia	4	7	DNF	2	191
7.	Italy		6	5	7	151
8.	Slovakia	5		6	8	147
9.	Poland	6		7	9	135
10.	Romania	7	9			85
11.	Japan		8	8		84
12.	Czech Republic	DNF		9	DNS	39
