= 2009–10 Luge World Cup =

International luge competition

Winners
- Men's singles: Armin Zöggeler (ITA)
- Doubles: André Florschütz / Torsten Wustlich (GER)
- Women's singles: Tatjana Hüfner (GER)
- Team relay: Germany

Competitions
- Venues: 8

The 2009–10 Luge World Cup was a multi race tournament over a season for luge. The season started 17 November 2009 in Calgary, Canada and ended 31 January 2010 in Cesana, Italy. The World Cup was organised by the FIL and sponsored by Viessmann. This cup served as qualifiers up to 31 December 2009 (last qualifier at Lillehammer, Norway) for the 2010 Winter Olympics luge events in Vancouver.

== Calendar ==
| Venue | Date | Details |
|---|---|---|
| (Canada) Calgary | 20–21 November 2009 | |
| (Austria) Innsbruck | 28–29 November 2009 | |
| (Germany) Altenberg | 5–6 December 2009 | |
| (Norway) Lillehammer | 12–13 December 2009 | |
| (Germany) Königssee | 2–3 January 2010 | |
| (Germany) Winterberg | 9–10 January 2010 | |
| (Germany) Oberhof | 16–17 January 2010 | |
| (Italy) Cesana | 30–31 January 2010 | |

== Results ==
=== Men's singles ===
| Event: | Gold: | Time | Silver: | Time | Bronze: | Time |
|---|---|---|---|---|---|---|
| Calgary | Armin Zöggeler; Italy | 1:30.068; 45.046/45.022 | David Möller; Germany | 1:30.124; 45.014/45.110 | Albert Demtschenko; Russia | 1:30.166; 45.044/45.122 |
| Innsbruck | Armin Zöggeler; Italy | 1:37.988; 48.775/49.213 | Wilfried Huber; Italy | 1:38.085; 48.957/49.128 | Viktor Kneib; Russia | 1:38.091; 49.179/48.912 |
| Altenberg | Felix Loch; Germany | 1:48.911; 54.515/54.396 | Armin Zöggeler; Italy | 1:48.969; 54.495/54.474 | Albert Demtschenko; Russia | 1:49.049; 54.572/54.477 |
| Lillehammer | Albert Demtschenko; Russia | 1:40.356; 50.191/50.165 | Armin Zöggeler; Italy | 1:40.406; 50.183/50.223 | Felix Loch; Germany | 1:40.674; 50.396/50.278 |
| Königssee | Albert Demtschenko; Russia | 1:34.176; 47.127/47.049 | Armin Zöggeler; Italy | 1:34.549; 47.350/47.199 | David Möller; Germany | 1:34.640; 47.360/47.280 |
| Winterberg | Armin Zöggeler; Italy | 1:47.601; 53.890/53.711 | Albert Demtschenko; Russia | 1:47.621; 53.667/53.954 | David Möller; Germany | 1:47.652; 54.008/53.644 |
| Oberhof | Andi Langenhan; Germany | 1:31.383; 45.777/45.606 | Johannes Ludwig; Germany | 1:31.466; 45.825/45.641 | Jan-Armin Eichhorn; Germany | 1:31.477; 45.704/45.773 |
| Cesana | Armin Zöggeler; Italy | 1:43.115; 51.611/51.504 | Felix Loch; Germany | 1:43.434; 51.786/51.648 | Johannes Ludwig; Germany | 1:43.493; 51.758/51.735 |

=== Doubles ===
| Event: | Gold: | Time | Silver: | Time | Bronze: | Time |
|---|---|---|---|---|---|---|
| Calgary | Patric Leitner; Alexander Resch; Germany | 1:27.855; 44.095/43.760 | André Florschütz; Torsten Wustlich; Germany | 1:27.886; 43.926/43.960 | Christian Oberstolz; Patrick Gruber; Italy | 1:28.059; 44.046/44.013 |
| Innsbruck | Patric Leitner; Alexander Resch; Germany | 1:18.631; 39.278/39.353 | André Florschütz; Torsten Wustlich; Germany | 1:18.732; 39.380/39.352 | Andreas Linger; Wolfgang Linger; Austria | 1:18.737; 39.344/39.393 |
| Altenberg | André Florschütz; Torsten Wustlich; Germany | 1:24.460; 42.240/42.220 | Peter Penz; Georg Fischler; Austria | 1:24.479; 42.215/42.264 | Christian Oberstolz; Patrick Gruber; Italy | 1:24.565; 42.245/42.320 |
| Lillehammer | Andreas Linger; Wolfgang Linger; Austria | 1:36.829; 48.409/48.420 | Christian Oberstolz; Patrick Gruber; Italy | 1:36.917; 48.470/48.447 | Gerhard Plankensteiner; Oswald Haselrieder; Italy | 1:37.053; 48.474/48.579 |
| Königssee | Tobias Wendl; Tobias Arlt; Germany | 1:34.496; 47.362/47.134 | André Florschütz; Torsten Wustlich; Germany | 1:34.584; 47.382/47.202 | Andreas Linger; Wolfgang Linger; Austria | 1:34.590; 47.309/47.281 |
| Winterberg | Christian Oberstolz; Patrick Gruber; Italy | 1:28.597; 44.323/44.274 | Gerhard Plankensteiner; Oswald Haselrieder; Italy | 1:28.805; 44.432/44.373 | Patric Leitner; Alexander Resch; Germany | 1:28.990; 44.447/44.543 |
| Oberhof | André Florschütz; Torsten Wustlich; Germany | 1:25.567; 42.717/42.850 | Tobias Wendl; Tobias Arlt; Germany | 1:25.633; 42.781/42.852 | Patric Leitner; Alexander Resch; Germany | 1:26.001; 43.028/42.973 |
| Cesana | Tobias Wendl; Tobias Arlt; Germany | 1:32.982; 46.407/46.575 | Christian Oberstolz; Patrick Gruber; Italy | 1:32.991; 46.293/46.698 | Patric Leitner; Alexander Resch; Germany | 1:33.011; 46.430/46.581 |

=== Women's singles ===
| Event: | Gold: | Time | Silver: | Time | Bronze: | Time |
|---|---|---|---|---|---|---|
| Calgary | Tatjana Hüfner; Germany | 1:33.691; 46.824/46.867 | Natalie Geisenberger; Germany | 1:33.858; 46.903/46.955 | Anke Wischnewski; Germany | 1:34.024; 46.981/47.043 |
| Innsbruck | Natalie Geisenberger; Germany | 1:19.229; 39.569/39.660 | Tatjana Hüfner; Germany | 1:19.282; 39.638/39.644 | Anke Wischnewski; Germany | 1:19.289; 39.663/39.626 |
| Altenberg | Tatjana Hüfner; Germany | 1:47.555; 53.815/53.740 | Natalie Geisenberger; Germany | 1:47.744; 53.904/53.840 | Anke Wischnewski; Germany | 1:47.994; 54.066/53.928 |
| Lillehammer | Tatjana Hüfner; Germany | 1:37.579; 48.856/48.723 | Natalie Geisenberger; Germany | 1:37.595; 48.848/48.747 | Erin Hamlin; United States | 1:37.616; 48.791/48.825 |
| Königssee | Tatjana Hüfner; Germany | 1:35.324; 47.787/47.537 | Natalie Geisenberger; Germany | 1:35.550; 47.896/47.654 | Steffi Sieger; Germany | 1:35.867; 47.992/47.875 |
| Winterberg | Natalie Geisenberger; Germany | 1:53.179; 56.714/56.465 | Tatjana Hüfner; Germany | 1:53.189; 56.792/56.397 | Erin Hamlin; United States | 1:53.329; 56.777/56.552 |
| Oberhof | Tatjana Hüfner; Germany | 1:25.936; 42.920/43.016 | Anke Wischnewski; Germany | 1:26.203; 43.158/43.045 | Natalie Geisenberger; Germany | 1:26.322; 43.071/43.251 |
| Cesana | Natalie Geisenberger; Germany | 1:33.811; 46.817/46.994 | Tatjana Hüfner; Germany | 1:33.873; 46.887/46.986 | Erin Hamlin; United States | 1:33.925; 46.884/47.041 |

=== Team relay ===
| Event: | Gold: | Time | Silver: | Time | Bronze: | Time |
|---|---|---|---|---|---|---|
| Innsbruck | Canada; Samuel Edney; Alex Gough; Chris Moffat / Mike Moffat | 2:10.864; 41.253 / 44.769 / 44.842 | Austria; Reinhard Egger; Nina Reithmayer; Andreas Linger / Wolfgang Linger | 2:11.868; 41.631 / 45.109 / 45.128 | Latvia; Guntis Rēķis; Maija Tīruma; Andris Šics / Juris Šics | 2:12.094; 41.725 / 45.466 / 44.903 |
| Altenberg | Germany; Felix Loch; Tatjana Hüfner; Tobias Wendl / Tobias Arlt | 2:25.742; 47.258 / 49.257 / 49.227 | United States; Tony Benshoof; Erin Hamlin; Christian Niccum / Dan Joye | 2:26.680; 47.402 / 49.426 / 49.852 | Canada; Samuel Edney; Alex Gough; Chris Moffat / Mike Moffat | 2:26.941; 47.371 / 49.935 / 49.635 |
| Königssee | Germany; Felix Loch; Tatjana Hüfner; Tobias Wendl / Tobias Arlt | 2:38.302; 53.260 / 51.424 / 53.618 | Austria; Daniel Pfister; Nina Reithmayer; Andreas Linger / Wolfgang Linger | 2:38.951; 53.713 / 51.683 / 53.555 | Canada; Samuel Edney; Alex Gough; Chris Moffat / Mike Moffat | 2:39.077; 53.439 / 51.350 / 54.288 |
| Winterberg | Germany; Johannes Ludwig; Tatjana Hüfner; Tobias Wendl / Tobias Arlt | 2:25.827; 49.253 / 47.598 / 48.976 | Austria; Wolfgang Kindl; Nina Reithmayer; Andreas Linger / Wolfgang Linger | 2:26.392; 49.357 / 47.845 / 49.190 | United States; Bengt Walden; Erin Hamlin; Mark Grimmette / Brian Martin | 2:26.663; 49.280 / 47.776 / 49.607 |
| Oberhof | Germany; David Möller; Tatjana Hüfner; Patric Leitner / Alexander Resch | 2:29.779; 50.245 / 48.891 / 50.643 | Austria; Daniel Pfister; Nina Reithmayer; Andreas Linger / Wolfgang Linger | 2:30.258; 50.545 / 49.337 / 50.376 | Italy; Armin Zöggeler; Sandra Gasparini; Christian Oberstolz / Patrick Gruber | 2:30.684; 50.369 / 49.973 / 50.342 |

== Standings ==
=== Men's singles ===
| Pos. | Luger | CAL | IGL | ALT | LIL | KON | WIN | OBE | CES | Points |
|---|---|---|---|---|---|---|---|---|---|---|
| 1. | Armin Zöggeler (ITA) | 1 | 1 | 2 | 2 | 2 | 1 | 6 | 1 | 705 |
| 2. | Albert Demtschenko (RUS) | 3 | 9 | 3 | 1 | 1 | 2 | 4 | 31 | 534 |
| 3. | Felix Loch (GER) | 4 | 4 | 1 | 3 | 9 | 17 | 7 | 2 | 484 |
| 4. | David Möller (GER) | 2 | 7 | 4 | 6 | 3 | 3 | 5 | 15 | 462 |
| 5. | Reinhold Rainer (ITA) | 15 | 5 | 14 | 4 | 7 | 5 | 8 | 4 | 372 |
| 6. | Johannes Ludwig (GER) | 19 | 15 | 5 | 10 | 29 | 4 | 2 | 3 | 366 |
| 7. | Jan-Armin Eichhorn (GER) | 11 | 6 | 7 | 17 | 8 | 8 | 3 | 9 | 347 |
| 8. | Andi Langenhan (GER) | 16 | 11 | 6 | 22 | 4 | 12 | 1 | 21 | 340 |
| 9. | Tony Benshoof (USA) | 6 | 10 | 10 | 9 | 13 | 13 | 11 | 5 | 310 |
| 10. | Viktor Kneib (RUS) | 8 | 3 | 9 | 8 | 5 | dsq | 16 | 10 | 309 |
| 11. | David Mair (ITA) | 21 | 21 | 11 | 5 | 14 | 6 | 13 | 6 | 286 |
| 12. | Daniel Pfister (AUT) | 18 | 8 | 12 | 12 | 6 | 11 | 10 | 13 | 279 |
| 13. | Wilfried Huber (ITA) | 20 | 2 | 21 | 11 | 17 | 15 | 15 | 16 | 261 |
| 14. | Wolfgang Kindl (AUT) | 14 | 14 | 15 | 15 | 11 | 7 | 9 | 12 | 259 |
| 15. | Samuel Edney (CAN) | 5 | 18 | 8 | – | 15 | 24 | 51 | 7 | 210 |
| 16. | Stefan Höhener (SUI) | 24 | 25 | 37 | 14 | 12 | 9 | 19 | 11 | 192 |
| 17. | Manuel Pfister (AUT) | 25 | 17 | 16 | 13 | 10 | 19 | 20 | dnf | 188 |
| 18. | Reinhard Egger (AUT) | 7 | 13 | 17 | 16 | 27 | 26 | 26 | 24 | 186 |
| 19. | Bengt Walden (USA) | 10 | 19 | 18 | 21 | 30 | 29 | 25 | 17 | 164 |
| 19. | Gregory Carigiet (SUI) | 17 | 23 | 42 | 24 | 16 | 14 | 32 | 8 | 164 |

=== Doubles ===
| Pos. | Lugers | CAL | IGL | ALT | LIL | KON | WIN | OBE | CES | Points |
|---|---|---|---|---|---|---|---|---|---|---|
| 1. | André Florschütz / Torsten Wustlich (GER) | 2 | 2 | 1 | 5 | 2 | 12 | 1 | 6 | 592 |
| 2. | Patric Leitner / Alexander Resch (GER) | 1 | 1 | 6 | 6 | 4 | 3 | 3 | 3 | 570 |
| 3. | Christian Oberstolz / Patrick Gruber (ITA) | 3 | 4 | 3 | 2 | 5 | 1 | 19 | 2 | 547 |
| 4. | Tobias Wendl / Tobias Arlt (GER) | 11 | 5 | 5 | 8 | 1 | 5 | 2 | 1 | 526 |
| 5. | Andreas Linger / Wolfgang Linger (AUT) | 4 | 3 | 4 | 1 | 3 | 9 | 4 | 4 | 519 |
| 6. | Gerhard Plankensteiner / Oswald Haselrieder (ITA) | – | 8 | 8 | 3 | 8 | 2 | 5 | dnf | 336 |
| 7. | Andris Šics / Juris Šics (LAT) | 7 | 6 | 11 | 9 | 10 | 10 | 8 | 7 | 329 |
| 8. | Christian Niccum / Dan Joye (USA) | dsq | 12 | 9 | 4 | 6 | 8 | 9 | 5 | 317 |
| 9. | Markus Schiegl / Tobias Schiegl (AUT) | 5 | 7 | 10 | 10 | 9 | 6 | 6 | dnf | 312 |
| 10. | Mark Grimmette / Brian Martin (USA) | 8 | 18 | 15 | 13 | 11 | 4 | 7 | 11 | 295 |
| 11. | Peter Penz / Georg Fischler (AUT) | 6 | 13 | 2 | 7 | 7 | dnf | 10 | – | 293 |
| 12. | Hans Peter Fischnaller / Patrick Schwienbacher (ITA) | 15 | 20 | 7 | 11 | 12 | 7 | 12 | 8 | 279 |
| 13. | Pavel Kuzmich / Boris Kuryschkin (RUS) | 23 | 16 | 12 | 17 | – | 13 | 16 | 9 | 193 |
| 14. | Vladislav Yuzhakov / Vladimir Makhnutin (RUS) | 12 | 14 | 19 | 18 | 19 | 17 | 12 | - | 183 |
| 15. | Chris Moffat / Mike Moffat (CAN) | 10 | 11 | 14 | – | 14 | 21 | 11 | – | 180 |
| 16. | Mikhail Kuzmich / Stanislav Mikheev (RUS) | 16 | – | 17 | – | 16 | 11 | 13 | 10 | 174 |
| 17. | Jan Harnis / Branislav Regec (SVK) | 9 | 10 | 18 | 14 | dsq | 22 | 14 | – | 173 |
| 18. | Andriy Kis / Yuriy Hayduk (UKR) | 18 | 19 | 24 | 16 | 13 | 16 | 21 | – | 162 |
| 19. | Lubos Jira / Matej Kvicala (CZE) | 21 | 24 | 16 | 22 | 17 | 23 | 18 | – | 146 |
| 20. | Antonín Brož / Lukáš Brož (CZE) | 24 | 31 | 27 | 19 | 18 | 14 | 17 | – | 138 |

=== Women's singles ===
| Pos. | Luger | CAL | IGL | ALT | LIL | KON | WIN | OBE | CES | Points |
|---|---|---|---|---|---|---|---|---|---|---|
| 1. | Tatjana Hüfner (GER) | 1 | 2 | 1 | 1 | 1 | 2 | 1 | 2 | 755 |
| 2. | Natalie Geisenberger (GER) | 2 | 1 | 2 | 2 | 2 | 1 | 3 | 1 | 710 |
| 3. | Anke Wischnewski (GER) | 3 | 3 | 3 | 5 | 4 | 4 | 2 | 9 | 509 |
| 4. | Erin Hamlin (USA) | 7 | 9 | 5 | 3 | 5 | 3 | 8 | 3 | 447 |
| 5. | Nina Reithmayer (AUT) | 5 | 6 | 6 | 7 | 6 | 7 | 6 | 10 | 383 |
| 6. | Corinna Martini (GER) | 4 | 5 | 4 | 14 | – | 5 | 5 | 5 | 368 |
| 7. | Alex Gough (CAN) | 6 | 4 | 12 | – | 12 | 6 | 12 | 4 | 316 |
| 8. | Veronika Halder (AUT) | 8 | 10 | 8 | 6 | 14 | 15 | 7 | 11 | 304 |
| 9. | Alexandra Rodionova (RUS) | 9 | 11 | 7 | 8 | 10 | 16 | 15 | 6 | 298 |
| 10. | Natalya Yakuchenko (UKR) | 20 | 8 | 24 | 4 | 18 | 8 | 4 | – | 265 |
| 11. | Martina Kocher (SUI) | 13 | 16 | 15 | 18 | 9 | 13 | 11 | 7 | 253 |
| 12. | Maija Tīruma (LAT) | 12 | 7 | 9 | 10 | 13 | dnf | 17 | 14 | 235 |
| 13. | Julia Clukey (USA) | 11 | 12 | – | 19 | 7 | 10 | 14 | 17 | 222 |
| 14. | Megan Sweeney (USA) | 29 | 22 | 17 | 13 | 17 | 11 | 16 | 8 | 211 |
| 15. | Regan Lauscher (CAN) | 10 | 15 | 14 | – | 11 | 14 | 9 | – | 191 |
| 16. | Tatiana Ivanova (RUS) | 18 | 21 | 11 | 9 | 26 | dnf | 10 | 20 | 188 |
| 17. | Ewelina Staszulonek (POL) | 14 | 17 | 20 | 17 | 8 | 12 | dnf | – | 171 |
| 18. | Sandra Gasparini (ITA) | 21 | 51 | 16 | 11 | 16 | 9 | 18 | – | 167 |
| 19. | Natalia Khoreva (RUS) | 19 | 18 | dnf | 24 | 15 | 18 | 13 | 19 | 163 |
| 20. | Meaghan Simister (CAN) | 17 | 14 | 10 | – | 25 | 17 | 19 | – | 150 |
| 30. | Steffi Sieger (GER) | – | – | – | – | 3 | – | – | – | 70 |

=== Team relay ===
| Pos. | Team | IGL | ALT | KON | WIN | OBE | Points |
|---|---|---|---|---|---|---|---|
| 1. | Germany | DSQ | 1 | 1 | 1 | 1 | 400 |
| 2. | Austria | 2 | 5 | 2 | 2 | 2 | 395 |
| 3. | Canada | 1 | 3 | 3 | 5 | 7 | 341 |
| 4. | Latvia | 3 | 4 | 4 | 4 | 4 | 310 |
| 5. | United States | 4 | 2 | DSQ | 3 | 5 | 270 |
| 6. | Russia | 7 | 7 | 5 | 6 | 6 | 247 |
| 7. | Slovakia | 6 | 8 | 6 | 9 | 8 | 223 |
| 8. | Ukraine | 5 | 10 | DNF | 7 | – | 137 |
| 9. | Romania | 8 | 9 | – | 8 | – | 123 |
| 10. | Italy | DNF | 6 | DNF | DSQ | 3 | 120 |
| 11. | Czech Republic | – | 11 | 7 | DSQ | 9 | 119 |
| 12. | Poland | DSQ | – | – | – | – | 0 |
