= 2008–09 Luge World Cup =

International luge competition

Winners
- Men's singles: (Italy) Armin Zöggeler
- Doubles: (Italy) Christian Oberstolz / Patrick Gruber
- Women's singles: (Germany) Tatjana Hüfner

Competitions
- Venues: 9

The 2008–09 Luge World Cup was a multi race competition over a season for luge. The season started on 29 November 2008 and ended on 21 February 2009. The World Cup was organised by the FIL and sponsored by Viessmann. These cups served as qualifiers for the 2010 Winter Olympics luge events in Vancouver.

== Calendar ==
| Place | Date | Disc. | Winner | Second | Third |
|---|---|---|---|---|---|
| (Austria) Innsbruck | November 29, 2008 | Doubles | Italy; Gerhard Plankensteiner; Oswald Haselrieder | Austria; Andreas Linger; Wolfgang Linger | Austria; Markus Schiegl; Tobias Schiegl |
| (Austria) Innsbruck | November 30, 2008 | Men's | Andi Langenhan (GER) | David Möller (GER) | Armin Zöggeler (ITA) |
| (Austria) Innsbruck | November 30, 2008 | Women's | Tatjana Hüfner (GER) | Natalie Geisenberger (GER) | Anke Wischnewski (GER) |
| (Latvia) Sigulda | December 6, 2008 | Women's | Tatjana Hüfner (GER) | Natalia Yakushenko (UKR) | Anke Wischnewski (GER) |
| (Latvia) Sigulda | December 6, 2008 | Doubles | Italy; Christian Oberstolz; Patrick Gruber | Austria; Andreas Linger; Wolfgang Linger | Austria; Peter Penz; Georg Fischler |
| (Latvia) Sigulda | December 7, 2008 | Men's | Albert Demtschenko (RUS) | Armin Zöggeler (ITA) | David Möller (GER) |
| (Germany) Winterberg | December 13, 2008 | Men's | Armin Zöggeler (ITA) | David Möller (GER) | Johannes Ludwig (GER) |
| (Germany) Winterberg | December 13, 2008 | Doubles | Italy; Christian Oberstolz; Patrick Gruber | Austria; Markus Schiegl; Tobias Schiegl | Germany; Patric Leitner; Alexander Resch |
| (Germany) Winterberg | December 14, 2008 | Women's | Natalie Geisenberger (GER) | Tatjana Hüfner (GER) | Anke Wischnewski (GER) |
| (Germany) Königssee | January 3, 2009 | Doubles | Germany; Patric Leitner; Alexander Resch | Germany; Tobias Wendl; Tobias Arlt | Austria; Andreas Linger; Wolfgang Linger |
| (Germany) Königssee | January 3, 2009 | Women's | Tatjana Hüfner (GER) | Natalie Geisenberger (GER) | Anke Wischnewski (GER) |
| (Germany) Königssee | January 4, 2009 | Men's | Armin Zöggeler (ITA) | David Möller (GER) | Felix Loch (GER) |
| (Italy) Cesana | January 10, 2009 | Women's | Tatjana Hüfner (GER) | Natalie Geisenberger (GER) | Nina Reithmayer (AUT) |
| (Italy) Cesana | January 10, 2009 | Doubles | Italy; Christian Oberstolz; Patrick Gruber | Italy; Gerhard Plankensteiner; Oswald Haselrieder | Latvia; Andris Šics; Juris Šics |
| (Italy) Cesana | January 11, 2009 | Men's | Armin Zöggeler (ITA) | Felix Loch (GER) | Daniel Pfister (AUT) |
| (Germany) Oberhof | January 17, 2009 | Doubles | Germany; Tobias Wendl; Tobias Arlt | Germany; Patric Leitner; Alexander Resch | Germany; André Florschütz; Torsten Wustlich |
| (Germany) Oberhof | January 17, 2009 | Men's | Jan Eichhorn (GER) | Felix Loch (GER) | David Möller (GER) |
| (Germany) Oberhof | January 18, 2009 | Women's | Tatjana Hüfner (GER) | Natalie Geisenberger (GER) | Anke Wischnewski (GER) |
| (Germany) Altenberg | January 24, 2009 | Doubles | Italy; Christian Oberstolz; Patrick Gruber | Germany; Patric Leitner; Alexander Resch | Austria; Andreas Linger; Wolfgang Linger |
| (Germany) Altenberg | January 24, 2009 | Women's | Natalie Geisenberger (GER) | Tatjana Hüfner (GER) | Anke Wischnewski (GER) |
| (Germany) Altenberg | January 25, 2009 | Men's | Armin Zöggeler (ITA) | Felix Loch (GER) | David Möller (GER) |
| (United States) Lake Placid | February 6–8, 2009 | FIL World Luge Championships 2009 | | | |
| (Canada) Calgary | February 13, 2009 | Women's | Tatjana Hüfner (GER) | Natalie Geisenberger (GER) | Veronika Halder (AUT) |
| (Canada) Calgary | February 14, 2009 | Men's | Armin Zöggeler (ITA) | Felix Loch (GER) | Albert Demtschenko (RUS) |
| (Canada) Calgary | February 14, 2009 | Doubles | Italy; Christian Oberstolz; Patrick Gruber | Austria; Peter Penz; Georg Fischler | Italy; Gerhard Plankensteiner; Oswald Haselrieder |
| (Canada) Whistler | February 20, 2009 | Women's | Natalie Geisenberger (GER) | Tatjana Hüfner (GER) | Anke Wischnewski (GER) |
| (Canada) Whistler | February 20, 2009 | Doubles | Germany; André Florschütz; Torsten Wustlich | Germany; Patric Leitner; Alexander Resch | Austria; Andreas Linger; Wolfgang Linger |
| (Canada) Whistler | February 21, 2009 | Men's | David Möller (GER) | Armin Zöggeler (ITA) | Felix Loch (GER) |

== Standings ==
=== Men's singles ===
| Pos. | Luger | IGL | SIG | WIN | KÖN | CES | OBE | ALT | CAL | WHI | Points |
|---|---|---|---|---|---|---|---|---|---|---|---|
| 1. | (Italy) Armin Zöggeler | 3 | 2 | 1 | 1 | 1 | 7 | 1 | 1 | 2 | 786 |
| 2. | (Germany) David Möller | 2 | 3 | 2 | 2 | 4 | 3 | 3 | 11 | 1 | 659 |
| 3. | (Germany) Jan Eichhorn | 4 | 6 | 4 | 5 | 6 | 1 | 5 | 13 | 7 | 506 |
| 4. | (Germany) Felix Loch | | | | 3 | 2 | 2 | 2 | 2 | 3 | 480 |
| 5. | (Germany) Andi Langenhan | 1 | 13 | 5 | 8 | 14 | 8 | 7 | 5 | 5 | 453 |
| 6. | (Austria) Daniel Pfister | 7 | 7 | 6 | 4 | 3 | 5 | 4 | 4 | dnf | 447 |
| 7. | (Russia) Albert Demtschenko | dnf | 1 | 24 | 6 | 5 | 4 | 8 | 3 | 26 | 409 |
| 8. | (Germany) Johannes Ludwig | 11 | 9 | 3 | 19 | 13 | 6 | 6 | 23 | 4 | 373 |
| 9. | (Russia) Viktor Kneib | 5 | 5 | 8 | dsq | 7 | 11 | 14 | 8 | 6 | 352 |
| 10. | (Austria) Martin Abentung | 8 | 10 | 13 | 13 | 17 | 14 | 10 | 14 | 8 | 296 |
| 11. | (Austria) Wolfgang Kindl | 6 | 12 | 9 | 14 | 9 | 15 | 28 | 22 | 9 | 285 |
| 12. | (United States) Bengt Walden | 21 | 15 | 19 | 7 | 16 | 9 | 15 | 7 | 18 | 273 |
| 13. | (Italy) Reinhold Rainer | 10 | dnf | 11 | 16 | 8 | 10 | 18 | 12 | 10 | 264 |
| 14. | (Switzerland) Stefan Höhener | 9 | 21 | 10 | 10 | 10 | 18 | 11 | 19 | 25 | 262 |
| 15. | (Italy) David Mair | 17 | 18 | 17 | 9 | 12 | 24 | 9 | 16 | 11 | 257 |
| 16. | (Italy) Wilfried Huber | 12 | 17 | 20 | 11 | 11 | 21 | 12 | 14 | 16 | 250 |
| 17. | (Latvia) Guntis Rēķis | 23 | 4 | 7 | 23 | 18 | 16 | 20 | 30 | | 222 |
| 18. | (Austria) Manuel Pfister | 19 | 27 | 16 | 17 | 15 | 20 | 19 | 9 | 15 | 219 |
| 19. | (Canada) Jeff Christie | 14 | 16 | 18 | 12 | dnf | 13 | 16 | 17 | 13 | 217 |
| 20. | (Latvia) Inārs Kivlenieks | 16 | 11 | 12 | 18 | 19 | 22 | 25 | 25 | 17 | 211 |

=== Doubles ===
| Pos. | Lugers | IGL | SIG | WIN | KÖN | CES | OBE | ALT | CAL | WHI | Points |
|---|---|---|---|---|---|---|---|---|---|---|---|
| 1. | Christian Oberstolz / Patrick Gruber (ITA) | 4 | 1 | 1 | 4 | 1 | 4 | 1 | 1 | 5 | 735 |
| 2. | Patric Leitner / Alexander Resch (GER) | 5 | 9 | 3 | 1 | 6 | 2 | 2 | 4 | 2 | 629 |
| 3. | Andreas Linger / Wolfgang Linger (AUT) | 2 | 2 | 6 | 3 | 4 | 6 | 3 | 6 | 3 | 590 |
| 4. | Tobias Wendl / Tobias Arlt (GER) | 6 | 5 | 4 | 2 | 5 | 1 | 5 | 10 | 16 | 521 |
| 5. | Gerhard Plankensteiner / Oswald Haselrieder (ITA) | 1 | 4 | 17 | 6 | 2 | 5 | | 3 | 4 | 504 |
| 6. | Peter Penz / Georg Fischler (AUT) | 7 | 3 | 19 | 5 | 9 | 9 | 6 | 2 | 8 | 448 |
| 7. | Markus Schiegl / Tobias Schiegl (AUT) | 3 | 7 | 2 | 7 | 8 | 7 | 7 | 5 | dnf | 436 |
| 8. | Mark Grimmette / Brian Martin (USA) | 11 | 6 | 7 | 8 | 10 | 8 | 10 | 9 | 7 | 371 |
| 9. | Andris Šics / Juris Šics (LAT) | 9 | 11 | 9 | | 3 | 11 | 8 | 11 | 6 | 342 |
| 10. | André Florschütz / Torsten Wustlich (GER) | | | | | | 3 | 4 | 7 | 1 | 276 |
| 11. | Michail Kuzmich / Stanislav Mikheev (RUS) | 13 | 12 | 13 | 11 | 15 | 10 | 15 | 17 | 11 | 272 |
| 12. | Jan Harnis / Branislav Regec (SVK) | 26 | 18 | 11 | 12 | 14 | 14 | 13 | 16 | 13 | 245 |
| 13. | Christian Niccum / Dan Joye (USA) | 12 | 10 | 5 | 9 | | | | 8 | 10 | 240 |
| 14. | Hans Peter Fischnaller / Patrick Schwienbacher (ITA) | 10 | dnf | 18 | 14 | 12 | 16 | 12 | 13 | 15 | 232 |
| 15. | Vladislav Yuzhakov / Vladimir Makhnutin (RUS) | 16 | 14 | 23 | 18 | 18 | 15 | 14 | 19 | 12 | 225 |
| 16. | Andriy Kis / Yuriy Hayduk (UKR) | 18 | 13 | 12 | 19 | 13 | 21 | 22 | 24 | 14 | 221 |
| 17. | Chris Moffat / Mike Moffat (CAN) | | | | 10 | 11 | 12 | 9 | 12 | 9 | 212 |
| 18. | Antonín Brož / Lukáš Brož (CZE) | 15 | 17 | 15 | 17 | 19 | 13 | 16 | 20 | | 198 |
| 19. | Toni Eggert / Marcel Oster (GER) | 8 | 8 | 8 | | 7 | | | | | 172 |
| 20. | Ivan Nevmerzhitski / Oleg Medvedev (RUS) | 22 | | 10 | 13 | | 17 | 11 | 18 | | 166 |

=== Women's singles ===
| Pos. | Luger | IGL | SIG | WIN | KÖN | CES | OBE | ALT | CAL | WHI | Points |
|---|---|---|---|---|---|---|---|---|---|---|---|
| 1. | Tatjana Hüfner (GER) | 1 | 1 | 2 | 1 | 1 | 1 | 2 | 1 | 2 | 855 |
| 2. | Natalie Geisenberger (GER) | 2 | 4 | 1 | 2 | 2 | 2 | 1 | 2 | 1 | 785 |
| 3. | Anke Wischnewski (GER) | 3 | 3 | 3 | 3 | 8 | 3 | 3 | 4 | 3 | 592 |
| 4. | Nina Reithmayer (AUT) | 6 | 5 | 6 | 4 | 3 | 6 | 6 | 5 | 6 | 490 |
| 5. | Natalia Yakushenko (UKR) | 8 | 2 | 5 | 7 | 4 | 4 | 5 | 8 | 9 | 484 |
| 6. | Erin Hamlin (USA) | 4 | 11 | 8 | 11 | 9 | 24 | 8 | 7 | 5 | 369 |
| 7. | Veronika Halder (AUT) | 10 | 6 | 11 | 10 | 10 | 14 | 19 | 3 | 8 | 354 |
| 8. | Alex Gough (CAN) | 39 | 15 | 7 | 9 | 7 | 15 | 10 | 6 | 7 | 317 |
| 9. | Ewelina Staszulonek (POL) | 7 | 18 | 14 | 6 | | 8 | 7 | 21 | 12 | 287 |
| 10. | Anna Orlova (LAT) | 9 | 7 | 9 | 23 | 12 | 12 | 24 | 10 | 24 | 276 |
| 11. | Martina Kocher (SUI) | 23 | 17 | 10 | 8 | 11 | 9 | 15 | 13 | 20 | 270 |
| 12. | Steffi Sieger (GER) | 5 | 10 | | 5 | 6 | | | | 4 | 256 |
| 13. | Meaghan Simister (CAN) | 15 | 15 | 13 | 25 | 14 | 10 | 20 | 18 | 10 | 242 |
| 14. | Maija Tīruma (LAT) | dns | | | 17 | 5 | 7 | 9 | 9 | 11 | 237 |
| 15. | Liliya Ludan (UKR) | 16 | 12 | 16 | 27 | 13 | 18 | 17 | 15 | 15 | 225 |
| 16. | Natalia Khoreva (RUS) | 14 | 13 | 25 | 13 | 18 | 13 | 16 | 24 | 16 | 224 |
| 17. | Tatiana Ivanova (RUS) | 21 | 8 | 26 | 20 | 21 | 11 | 12 | | 19 | 206 |
| 18. | Alexandra Rodionova (RUS) | 13 | 21 | 17 | 15 | | 17 | 14 | 17 | 14 | 204 |
| 19. | Corinna Martini (GER) | | | 4 | | | 5 | 4 | 14 | | 203 |
| 20. | Madoka Harada (JPN) | 11 | dnf | 20 | 16 | 17 | 26 | 11 | 25 | 17 | 193 |
