= Oleg Medvedev =

Russian luger (born 1985)

Oleg Medvedev (born 14 June 1985) is a Russian luge athlete. Along with Ivan Nevmerzhitski he placed twentieth in the two man luge doubles in the 2008–09 Luge World Cup. In 2009, at the world championships in Lake Placid, New York, the aforementioned duo placed 18th in the two man luge event.
