= Tīruma =

Family name

Origin
- Origin: Latvian
- Meaning: "field"

Tīruma (masculine: Tīrums) is a Latvian topographic surname, derived from the Latvian word for "field" (tīrums). Individuals with the surname include:

- Elīza Cauce (born Tīruma in 1990), Latvian luger
- Maija Tīruma (born 1983), Latvian luger, sister of Elīza
