= Anastasia Oberstolz-Antonova =

Russian-Italian luger (born 1981)

Medal record

Luge

Representing Italy

World Championships
Bronze medal – third place	2004 Nagano	Mixed team
Bronze medal – third place	2005 Park City	Mixed team

European Championships
Silver medal – second place	2004 Oberhof	Mixed team
Silver medal – second place	2006 Winterberg	Mixed team

Anastasia Oberstolz-Antonova (born 12 October 1981) is a Soviet/Russian-born, Italian luger who has competed since the late 1990s and for Italy since 2003. She won two bronze medals in the mixed team event at the FIL World Luge Championships (2004, 2005).

At the FIL European Luge Championships, Oberstolz-Antonova earned two silver medals in the mixed team event (2004, 2006).

Oberstolz-Antonova finished 15th in the women's singles event at the 2002 Winter Olympics in Salt Lake City. At the following Winter Olympics, she was involved in a serious crash during the first run of the women's singles event and did not finish as a result.

Oberstolz-Antonova is married to fellow Italian luger Christian Oberstolz. She sat out the 2006-7 World Cup season, giving birth to a daughter, Alexandria, on 14 May 2007.
