= Marcel Oster =

German luger (born 1989)

Marcel Oster (born 5 April 1989 in Suhl, East Germany) is a German luger who has been competing since 2008. He finished 19th in the men's doubles standings in the 2008–09 Luge World Cup together with Toni Eggert.

He has been running luge since 2000.

He has started with Toni Eggert in the men's doubles from 2003 - 2010. 2007 and 2008 he won the world youth championship. 2008 he won the world youth world cup.

== See also ==
- List of Luge World Cup champions
- European Luge Championships
- European Luge Natural Track Championships
- Skeleton
