= Armin Zöggeler =

Italian luger (born 1974)

Armin Zöggeler OMRI
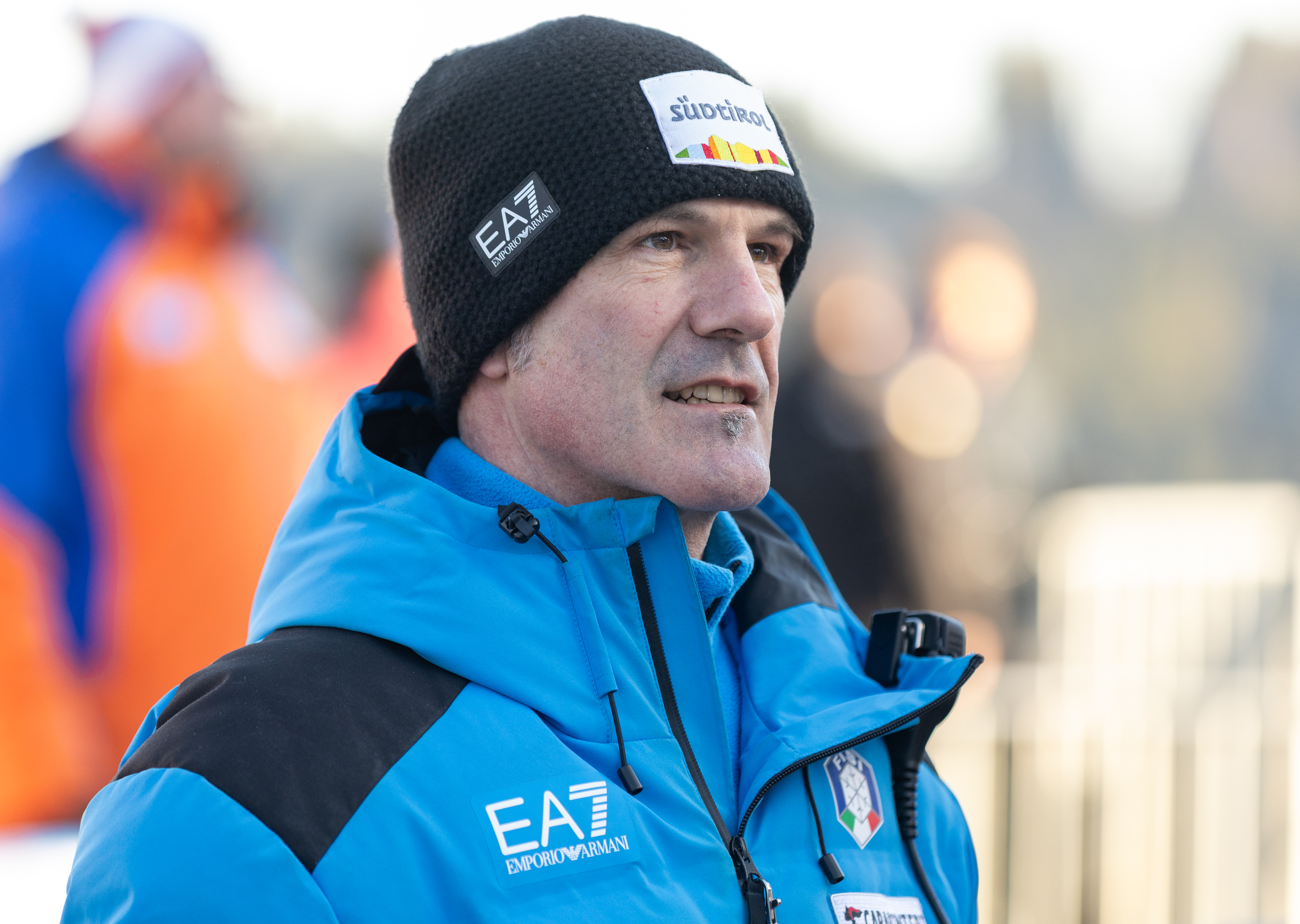
- Zöggeler in 2026

Personal information
- Born: 4 January 1974 (age 52) Meran, South Tyrol, Italy
- Height: 1.81 m (5 ft 11 in)
- Weight: 85 kg (187 lb)
- Children: 2
- Relative: Sandra Robatscher (niece)
- Website: www.arminzoeggeler.it

Sport
- Country: Italy
- Sport: Luge
- Event: Men´s singles
- Club: Centro Sportivo Carabinieri
- Turned pro: 1991
Medal record
Men's luge
Representing Italy
Event	1st	2nd	3rd
Olympic Games	2	1	3
World Championships	6	5	5
European Championships	4	6	8
Total	12	12	16
Olympic Games
Gold medal – first place	2002 Salt Lake City	Men's singles
Gold medal – first place	2006 Turin	Men's singles
Silver medal – second place	1998 Nagano	Men's singles
Bronze medal – third place	1994 Lillehammer	Men's singles
Bronze medal – third place	2010 Vancouver	Men's singles
Bronze medal – third place	2014 Sochi	Men's singles
World Championships
Gold medal – first place	1995 Lillehammer	Men's singles
Gold medal – first place	1999 Königssee	Men's singles
Gold medal – first place	2001 Calgary	Men's singles
Gold medal – first place	2003 Sigulda	Men's singles
Gold medal – first place	2005 Park City	Men's singles
Gold medal – first place	2011 Cesana	Men's singles
Silver medal – second place	1995 Lillehammer	Mixed team
Silver medal – second place	2000 St. Moritz	Men's singles
Silver medal – second place	2007 Igls	Men's singles
Silver medal – second place	2007 Igls	Mixed team
Silver medal – second place	2009 Lake Placid	Men's singles
Bronze medal – third place	1996 Altenberg	Mixed team
Bronze medal – third place	1997 Igls	Mixed team
Bronze medal – third place	2004 Nagano	Mixed team
Bronze medal – third place	2005 Park City	Mixed team
Bronze medal – third place	2012 Altenberg	Men's singles
World Cup
Gold medal – first place	1997–98	Men's singles
Gold medal – first place	1999–2000	Men's singles
Gold medal – first place	2000–01	Men's singles
Gold medal – first place	2003–04	Men's singles
Gold medal – first place	2005–06	Men's singles
Gold medal – first place	2006–07	Men's singles
Gold medal – first place	2007–08	Men's singles
Gold medal – first place	2008–09	Men's singles
Gold medal – first place	2009–10	Men's singles
Gold medal – first place	2010–11	Men's singles
Silver medal – second place	1994–95	Men's singles
Silver medal – second place	1995–96	Men's singles
Silver medal – second place	2001–02	Men's singles
Bronze medal – third place	2002–03	Men's singles
European Championships
Gold medal – first place	1994 Königssee	Mixed team
Gold medal – first place	2004 Oberhof	Men's singles
Gold medal – first place	2008 Cesana	Men's singles
Gold medal – first place	2014 Sigulda	Men's singles
Silver medal – second place	1998 Oberhof	Mixed team
Silver medal – second place	2004 Oberhof	Mixed team
Silver medal – second place	2006 Winterberg	Men's singles
Silver medal – second place	2006 Winterberg	Mixed team
Silver medal – second place	2012 Paramonovo	Men's singles
Silver medal – second place	2013 Oberhof	Mixed team
Bronze medal – third place	1994 Königssee	Men's singles
Bronze medal – third place	1996 Sigulda	Mixed team
Bronze medal – third place	2000 Winterberg	Men's singles
Bronze medal – third place	2000 Winterberg	Mixed team
Bronze medal – third place	2002 Altenberg	Men's singles
Bronze medal – third place	2008 Cesana	Mixed team
Bronze medal – third place	2012 Paramonovo	Mixed team
Bronze medal – third place	2014 Sigulda	Mixed team

Armin Zöggeler (born 4 January 1974) is a retired Italian luger and double Olympic champion. He is one of the most successful men in the sport, nicknamed Il Cannibale ("The Cannibal"), for his notable series of victories, or The Iceblood Champion, for his always cold, rational approach to the races. Fellow luger Tucker West described Zöggeler as the sport's equivalent of Michael Jordan.

At the Winter Olympic Games, Zöggeler has won six medals in six consecutive Olympics – and this is a record in sport. He also has sixteen medals at the FIL World Luge Championships. At the FIL European Luge Championships, Zöggeler has earned eighteen medals.

In June 2019 he was inducted in the FIL Hall of Fame.

== Personal life ==
Zöggeler was born in Meran, in the region of South Tyrol, into a farming family. A Carabiniere by profession, he began to luge at a very young age, over natural tracks. He won the junior World Cup when he was 14, and made his debut with the Italian national team at the age of 19. He also took three medals at the Junior World Championships: a silver in 1992 followed by two golds in 1993 and 1994. Despite a lack of tracks in Italy until the construction of the Cesana Pariol track for the 2006 Winter Olympics, he evolved into one of the most effective lugers ever.

Zöggeler lives in the town of Lana, South Tyrol. He got married on 12 May 2007, and had two children, Nina and Thomas. During times when he is not training, Zöggeler enjoys swimming, field hockey, and collecting and watching television dramas. He is the uncle of fellow luger Sandra Robatscher.

== Achievements ==
At the Winter Olympics, Zöggeler has won six medals in the same individual competition in six consecutive Olympics, the first to do so; including two golds (2002, 2006), one silver (1998), and three bronze (1994, 2010, 2014).

He has sixteen medals at the FIL World Luge Championships, including six golds (Men's singles: 1995, 1999, 2001, 2003, 2005, 2011), five silvers (Men's singles: 2000, 2007, 2009; Mixed team: 1995, 2007), and five bronzes (Mixed team: 1996, 1997, 2004, 2005, 2012).

At the FIL European Luge Championships, Zöggeler has earned eighteen medals. This includes four golds (Men's singles: 2004, 2008 and 2014; Mixed team: 1994), six silvers (Men's singles: 2006, 2012; Mixed team: 1998, 2004, 2006 and 2013), and eight bronzes (Men's singles: 1994, 2000, 2002; Mixed team: 1996, 2000, 2008, 2012 and 2014).

He won the overall Luge World Cup in men's singles ten times (1997–98, 1999–2000, 2000–01, 2003–04, 2005–06, 2006–07, 2007–08, 2008–09, 2009–10 and 2010–11). This is another record together with Markus Prock.

Zöggeler's 57 individual wins in the World Cup (as of January 2014), he is first of all time, beating the previous record of 33 wins by both German Georg Hackl and Austrian Markus Prock. He also took 26 seconds and 20 thirds in World Cup races.

He also won 20 Italian national championship titles between 1993 and 2013.

Zöggeler was made a Commander of the Order of Merit of the Italian Republic in 2010.

In March 2018 a 37-minute documentary film Armin Zöggeler: La leggenda dello slittino (Armin Zöggeler: the Legend of Luge) was exhibited and made available for loan free of charge in Bolzano, with Zöggeler meeting members of the audience after the screening.

== Sports career ==
Zöggeler carried the Italian flag at the closing ceremonies of the 2006 Torino Winter Olympics.

For the 2010 Winter Olympics, Zöggeler was given the opportunity to carry the flag for Italy at the opening ceremony, but he declined because the first two runs of the Olympic luge competition were scheduled at the Whistler Sliding Centre for the following evening. The honour instead went to cross-country skier Giorgio Di Centa.

He carried the flag for the 2014 Winter Olympics opening ceremony.

On 9 February 2014, Zöggeler became the first person in history to win six medals in the same individual competition in six consecutive Olympics, by winning a bronze. Other athletes who won medals in six consecutive Olympics did not do so in the same individual competition: Aladár Gerevich, a fencer from Hungary, won six gold medals between 1932 and 1960 with the Hungarian team; Elisabeta Lipă, a rower from Romania, won her medals between 1984 and 2004 in different disciplines (single scull, double scull, quadruple scull and eight).

In October 2014, Zöggeler announced his retirement from competition, taking up a post as head of materials research and development for the Italian luge team, working with the Italian National Olympic Committee, the Italian Winter Sports Federation and Ferrari. He joined the Italian National Olympic Committee's Athletes' Commission in 2016.

== See also ==
- Legends of Italian sport - Walk of Fame
- List of multiple Olympic medalists in one event

Records
Preceded by Aladár Gerevich	Athletes with the most medals at Olympic Games in one event (shared with Aladár Gerevich); 9 February 2014 – present	Succeeded by Incumbent
Awards and achievements
Preceded by Giuliano Razzoli	Italian Sportsman of the Year; 2011	Succeeded by Alex Zanardi
Olympic Games
Preceded by Giorgio Di Centa	Flagbearer for Italy; 2014 Sochi	Succeeded by Arianna Fontana
