= Anke Wischnewski =

German luger

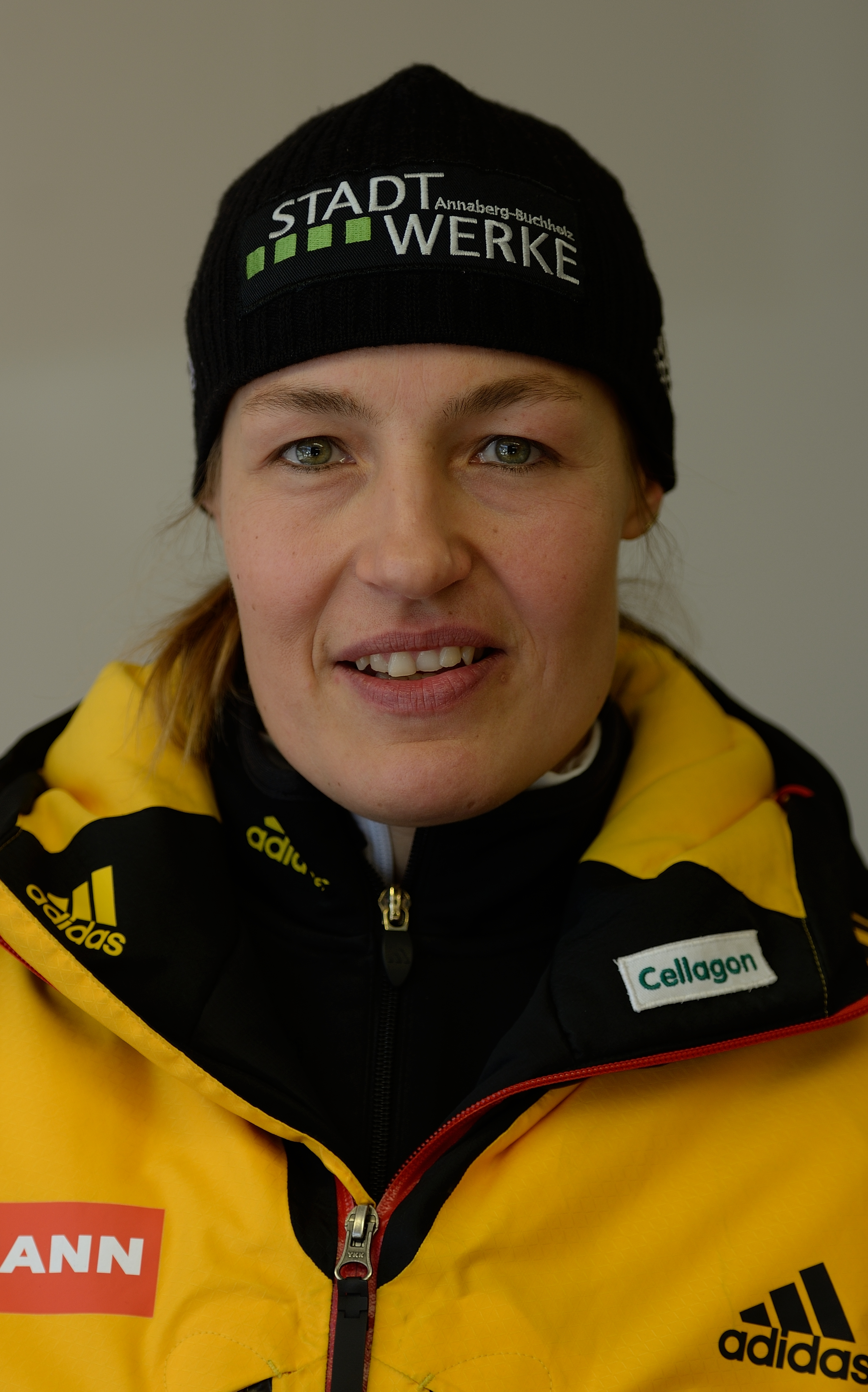

Personal information
- Nationality: German
- Born: 5 January 1978 (age 48) Annaberg-Buchholz, Saxony, East Germany
- Height: 1.78 m (5 ft 10 in)
- Weight: 77 kg (170 lb)

Sport
- Country: Germany
- Sport: luge
Medal record
Women's luge
Representing Germany
World Championships
Silver medal – second place	2007 Igls	Women's singles
Bronze medal – third place	2005 Park City	Women's singles
World Cup Championships
Silver medal – second place	2012–13	Women's singles
Bronze medal – third place	2006–07	Women's singles
Bronze medal – third place	2008–09	Women's singles
Bronze medal – third place	2009–10	Women's singles
Bronze medal – third place	2010–11	Women's singles
Bronze medal – third place	2011–12	Women's singles
European Championships
Bronze medal – third place	2013 Oberhof	Women's singles

Anke Wischnewski (born 5 January 1978 in Annaberg-Buchholz, Saxony) is a German former luger who has competed since 2001 to 2014. She won two medals in the women's singles at the FIL World Luge Championships with a silver in 2007 and a bronze in 2005.

Wischnewski's best finish at the FIL European Luge Championships in the women's singles event was third at Oberhof in 2013.

Her best finish in the overall Luge World Cup title was third in 2006-7.

Wishnewski qualified for the 2010 Winter Olympics where she finished fifth.
