= FIL European Luge Championships 2014 =

The 2014 FIL European Luge Championships took place under the auspices of the International Luge Federation at Sigulda, Latvia from 25 to 26 January 2014. This was the third time Sigulda hosted the event.

== Medalists ==
| Event | Gold | | Silver | | Bronze | |
|---|---|---|---|---|---|---|
| Men's singles | Armin Zöggeler; Italy | 1:35.913 | Johannes Ludwig; Germany | 1:36.019 | Dominik Fischnaller; Italy | 1:36.226 |
| Women's singles | Natalia Khoreva; Russia | 1:24.155 | Tatiana Ivanova; Russia | 1:24.325 | Dajana Eitberger; Germany | 1:24.444 |
| Doubles | Christian Oberstolz/Patrick Gruber; Italy | 1:23.388 | Vladislav Yuzhakov/Vladimir Makhnutin; Russia | 1:23.434 | Andreas Linger/Wolfgang Linger; Austria | 1:23.467 |
| Team relay | Russia; Natalia Khoreva; Albert Demchenko; Vladislav Yuzhakov/Vladimir Makhnutin | 2:13.485 | Latvia; Elīza Tīruma; Mārtiņš Rubenis; Andris Šics/Juris Šics | 2:13.835 | Italy; Sandra Gasparini; Armin Zöggeler; Christian Oberstolz/Patrick Gruber | 2:13.847 |

== Medal table ==
| Rank | Nation | Gold | Silver | Bronze | Total |
|---|---|---|---|---|---|
| 1 | Russia (RUS) | 2 | 2 | 0 | 4 |
| 2 | Italy (ITA) | 2 | 0 | 2 | 4 |
| 3 | Germany (GER) | 0 | 1 | 1 | 2 |
| 4 | Latvia (LAT) | 0 | 1 | 0 | 1 |
| 5 | Austria (AUT) | 0 | 0 | 1 | 1 |
| Totals (5 entries) | | 4 | 4 | 4 | 12 |
