= Klaus Kofler =

Italian luger (born 1981)

Klaus Kofler (born 8 December 1981) is an Italian luger who has been competing since 2004. His best Luge World Cup season finish was 11th in men's doubles in 2004–05.

Kofler's best finish at the FIL World Luge Championships was 12th in the men's doubles event at Oberhof in 2008. His best finish at the FIL European Luge Championships was ninth in men's doubles at Winterberg in 2006.
