= Natalia Yakushenko =

Ukrainian luger

Medal record

Women's luge

Representing Soviet Union

World Championships
Bronze medal – third place	1990 Calgary	Mixed team

Representing Ukraine

World Championships
Bronze medal – third place	2009 Lake Placid	Women's singles

Natalia Yakushenko (Ukrainian: Наталія Якушенко, born 2 March 1972) is a Soviet-Ukrainian luger who has competed since 1987. She won two bronze medals at the FIL World Luge Championships (Women's singles: 2009, Mixed team: 1990).

Competing in five Winter Olympics, Yakuchenko earned her best finish of eighth in the women's singles event both in 1992 and 1994.

== Luge World Cup ==
=== Podiums ===
Season	Stage	Result
1994–95	(Austria) Igls	3
1994–95	(Austria) Igls	3
2004–05	(Latvia) Sigulda	3
2005–06	(Austria) Igls	2
2005–06	(Germany) Oberhof	3
2006–07	(Germany) Winterberg	3
2006–07	(Latvia) Sigulda	2
2008–09	(Latvia) Sigulda	2

Olympic Games
Preceded by Olena Petrova	Flagbearer for Ukraine; Turin 2006	Succeeded by Liliya Ludan
