= Mārtiņš Rubenis =

Latvian luger (born 1978)

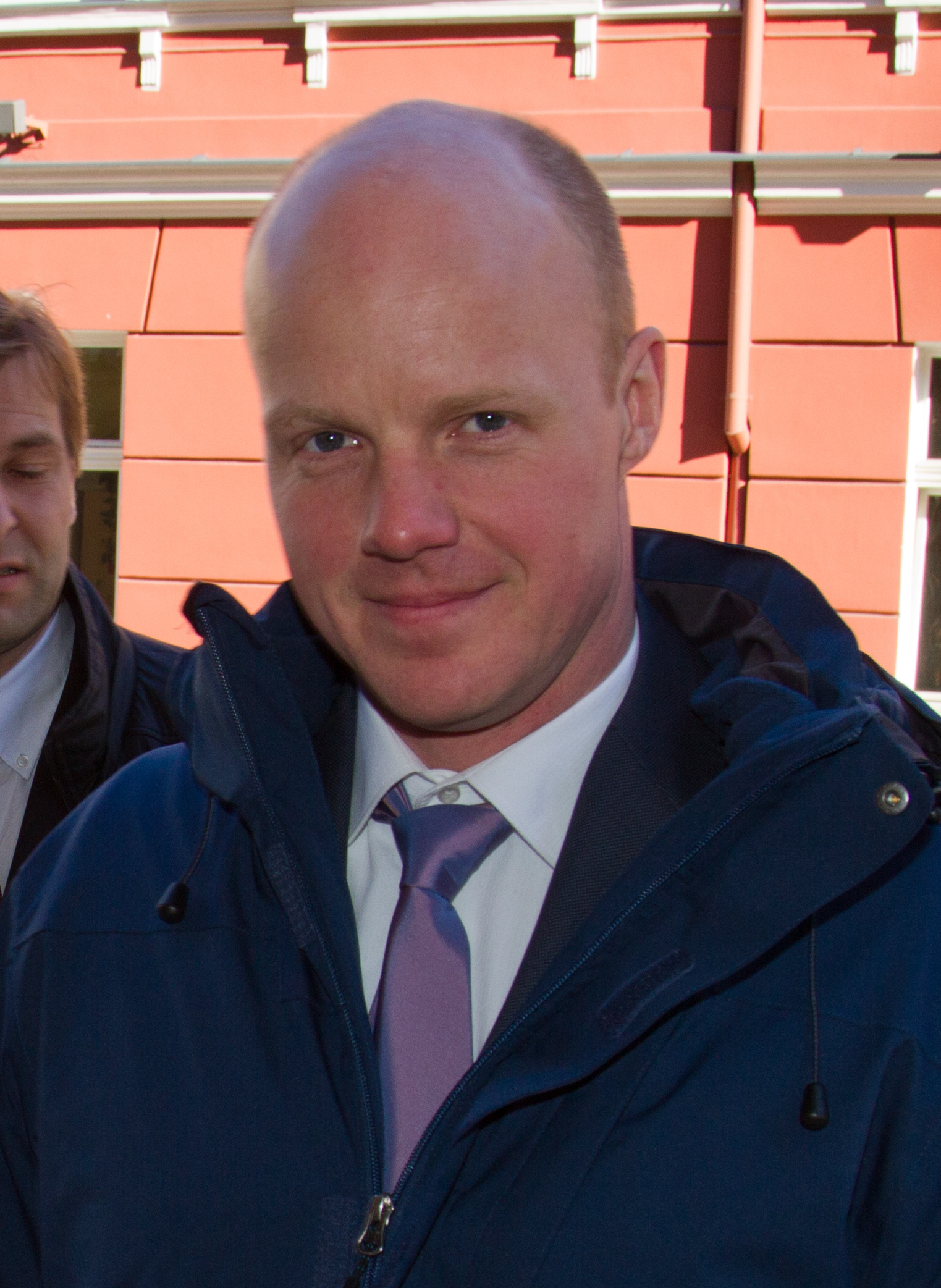
- Rubenis in 2013

Personal information
- Born: 26 September 1978 (age 48) Riga, Latvia
- Height: 184 cm (6 ft 0 in)
- Weight: 90 kg (198 lb)

Sport
- Sport: Luge
Medal record
Representing Latvia
Olympic Games
Bronze medal – third place	2006 Turin	Men's singles
Bronze medal – third place	2014 Sochi	Mixed team
World Championships
Silver medal – second place	2003 Sigulda	Men's singles
Silver medal – second place	2003 Sigulda	Mixed team
Bronze medal – third place	2004 Nagano	Men's singles
European Championships
Gold medal – first place	2008 Cesana	Mixed team
Gold medal – first place	2010 Sigulda	Mixed team
Silver medal – second place	2014 Sigulda	Mixed team
Bronze medal – third place	2006 Winterberg	Mixed team

Mārtiņš Rubenis (born 26 September 1978) is a retired Latvian luger who competed between 1998 and 2014. He won the bronze medal at the men's singles event at the 2006 Winter Olympics in Turin, becoming the first Latvian (i.e. representing Republic of Latvia, as opposed to the Soviet Union) to win a medal at the Winter Olympics and the only one fr He won his second bronze medal at the 2014 Winter Olympics in Sochi in the Team Relay event. In total he competed in five Olympics.

Rubenis has also won the gold medal at the 1998 World Junior Championships, as well as the silver and bronze medals at the 2003 and 2004 World Championships respectively. He also won three medals in the Team Relay event at the FIL European Luge Championships with a golds in 2008 and 2010, and a bronze in 2006.

Rubenis retired after the 2014 Winter Olympics. He announced his retirement after the men's event, in which he finished 10th, yet a few days later Rubenis won a bronze medal being a part of the Latvian Relay Team. As a result, he and his team-mates in the relay squad were featured on a commemorative stamp issued by Latvian Post. Following his retirement, he was appointed as coach of the Latvian national luge team, and additionally uses his skills as a mechanical engineer to design sleds for the team, having already made his own sleds whilst competing. He also became a member of the Latvian Olympic Committee, having previously served as an athlete representative to the International Luge Federation.

Rubenis is a musician and DJ and a member of the DJs group Värka Kru.

== Awards ==
- 2011 – The Three – Star Order
- 2014 – The Cross of Recognition

== Achievements ==
- 1998 – 1st place in World Junior championship
- 2000 – 11th place in World championship
- 2000 – 18th place Overall World Cup
- 2001 – 29th place in World championship
- 2001 – 25th place Overall World Cup
- 2002 – 15th place in European championship
- 2002 – 34th place Overall World Cup
- 2003 – 2nd place in World championship – team competition
- 2003 – 2nd place in World championship
- 2003 – 18th place Overall World Cup
- 2004 – 3rd place in World championship
- 2004 – 13th place Overall World Cup
- 2004 – 12th place Overall Challenge Cup
- 2005 – 11th place in World championship
- 2005 – 11th place Overall World Cup
- 2005 – 9th place Overall Challenge Cup
- 2006 – 3rd place in European championship – team competition
- 2006 – 7th place in European championship

== Olympic Games results ==
- 1998 – Nagano 14th place
- 2002 – Salt Lake City after crash – DNF
- 2006 – Torino 3rd place
- 2010 – Vancouver 11th place
- 2014 – Sochi 10th place
- 2014 – Sochi 3rd place Team Relay

Awards
Preceded by Viktors Ščerbatihs	Latvian Men's Sportspersonality of the Year; 2006	Succeeded by Viktors Ščerbatihs
