= Natalia Khoreva =

Russian luger (born 1986)

Medal record

Luge

Representing Russia

European Championships
Gold medal – first place	2014 Sigulda	Women's singles
Gold medal – first place	2014 Sigulda	Mixed team

Natalia Vladimirovna Khoreva (Russian: Ната́лья Влади́мировна Хо́рева; born 28 May 1986) is a Russian luger who has competed since 1999. She finished 16th in the 2008-09 Luge World Cup.

Khoreva's best finish at the FIL World Luge Championships was 24th in the women's singles event at Oberhof in 2008. Her best finish at the FIL European Luge Championships was tenth in the women's singles event at Sigulda in 2010.

Khoreva qualified for the 2010 Winter Olympics where she finished tenth in the women's singles event.
