= Courtney Zablocki =

American luger (born 1981)

Courtney Zablocki (born January 28, 1981) is an American luger who competed on the World Cup luge circuit from 1997 to 2010 and competed in eight World Championships. Competing in two Winter Olympics, she earned her best finish of fourth place in the women's singles event at Turin in 2006, missing a medal placement by only .392 of a second.

Zablocki's best finish at the FIL World Luge Championships was ninth in the women's singles event at Nagano in 2004.

Born in Hinsdale, Illinois, she resided in Highlands Ranch, Colorado. Before joining the Colorado Army National Guard after the 2006 Winter Olympics, Zablocki worked in the gardening department for The Home Depot from 2004 to the summer of 2006.

Zablocki underwent surgery on both of her hands during the week of 13 April 2009 to relieve pain and the surgery was successful.

She announced her retirement from luge on 9 August 2010, but still has intentions of wanting to remain in US Luge in some capacity.

Zablocki married on June 30, 2009, and took her husband's name, Landin. Landin now resides in Stockholm, Sweden and owns two businesses, www.livinghealthyhappy.com and www.happysleepingbaby.com. Landin has authored her first book about pregnancy training, Gravidstyrka. She has since written two books since titled, Happy Sleeping Baby ~ Your guide for sleep success, and Mammastyrka, a training book for after pregnancy. All books can be found on her web pages www.LivingHealthyHappy.com and HappySleepingBaby.com.

Landin has also created an online pregnancy training course, Gravidstyrka Certification, to help other professionals learn how to assist women during and after their pregnancies.
