= Albert Demchenko =

Russian luger (born 1971)

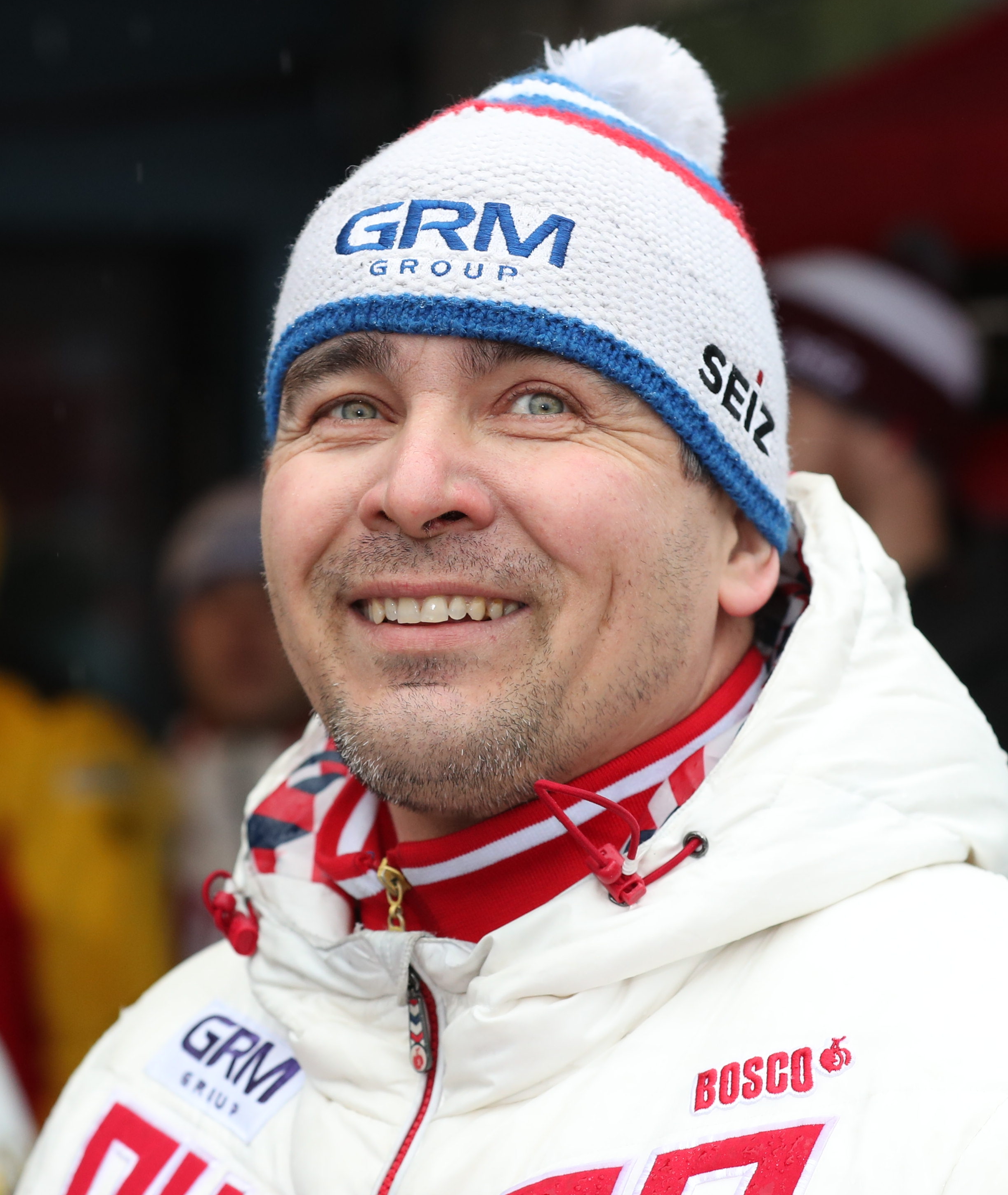
- Demchenko in 2020

Personal information
- Native name: Альберт Михайлович Демченко
- Full name: Albert Mikhailovich Demchenko
- Nationality: Russian
- Born: 27 November 1971 (age 54) Chusovoy, Perm Oblast, RSFSR, Soviet Union
- Height: 1.98 m (6 ft 6 in)
- Weight: 98 kg (216 lb)

Sport
- Country: Russia
- Sport: Luge
- Event: Men's singles
Medal record
Olympic Games
Silver medal – second place	2006 Turin	Men's singles
Silver medal – second place	2014 Sochi	Men's singles
Silver medal – second place	2014 Sochi	Mixed team
World Championships
Silver medal – second place	2012 Altenberg	Men's singles
Silver medal – second place	2012 Altenberg	Mixed team
World Cup Championships
Gold medal – first place	2004–05	Men's singles
Silver medal – second place	2009–10	Men's singles
Bronze medal – third place	2007–08	Men's singles
Bronze medal – third place	2010–11	Men's singles
European Championships
Gold medal – first place	2006 Winterberg	Men's singles
Gold medal – first place	2010 Sigulda	Men's singles
Gold medal – first place	2012 Paramonovo	Mixed team
Gold medal – first place	2014 Sigulda	Mixed team
Silver medal – second place	1996 Sigulda	Men's singles
Silver medal – second place	2008 Cesana	Men's singles
Bronze medal – third place	1996 Sigulda	Men's doubles
Bronze medal – third place	2013 Oberhof	Mixed team

Albert Mikhailovich Demchenko (Russian: Альберт Михайлович Демченко; born 27 November 1971) is a Russian luger who competed from 1992 to 2014. He is currently coaching the Russian luge team. His daughter Victoria Demchenko is also a luger.

== Career ==
A seven-time Winter Olympian, he won his first medal at the 2006 Winter Olympics in Turin with a silver in the men's singles event. He competed in his sixth Olympics at the 2010 Winter Olympics, coming fourth. He then competed in his seventh Olympics in Sochi 2014 in his native Russia, winning a further two silver medals.

Demchenko also won eight medals at the FIL European Luge Championships with four golds (Men's singles: 2006, 2010; Mixed team: 2012, 2014), two silvers (Men's singles: 1996, 2008), and two bronzes (Men's doubles: 1996; Mixed team: 2013).

He was the overall Luge World Cup champion in men's singles in 2004–05.

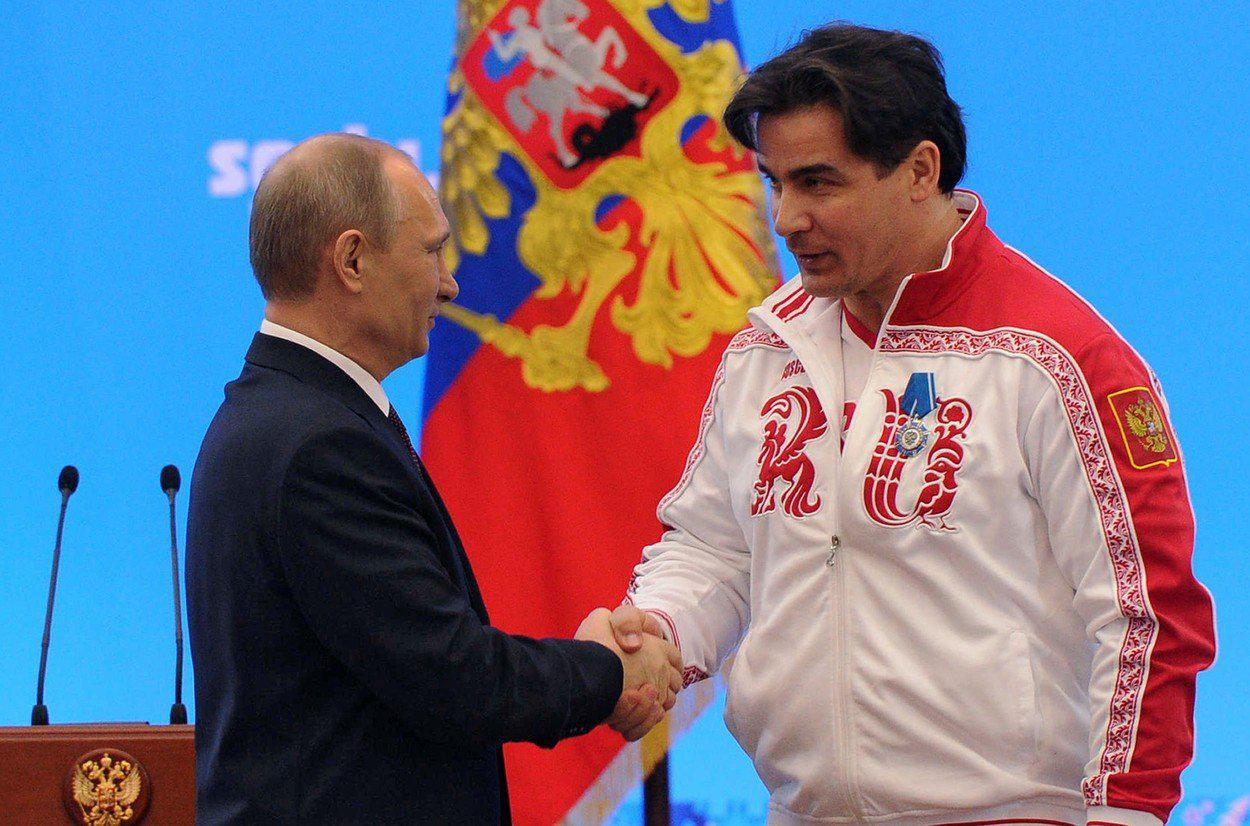
Demchenko with Vladimir Putin

In December 2017, he was one of eleven Russian athletes who were banned for life from the Olympics by the International Olympic Committee, after doping offences at the 2014 Winter Olympics. In January 2018, he and Tatyana Ivanova successfully appealed against the lifetime ban as well as decision to strip his medals from Sochi Olympics at the court of arbitration for sport. As a result, both his medals were reinstated.

== World Cup podiums ==
Season	Date	Location	Discipline	Place
1997–98	22 November 1997	Sigulda, Latvia	Singles	2nd
2002–03	18 November 2002	Park City, United States	Singles	3rd
2002–03	2 December 2002	Oberhof, Germany	Singles	1st
2002–03	20 January 2003	Igls, Austria	Singles	3rd
2004–05	8 November 2004	Altenberg, Germany	Singles	2nd
2004–05	15 November 2004	Sigulda, Latvia	Singles	1st
2004–05	6 December 2004	Calgary, Canada	Singles	3rd
2004–05	27 December 2004	Oberhof, Germany	Singles	1st
2004–05	3 January 2005	Königssee, Germany	Singles	1st
2004–05	17 January 2005	Altenberg, Germany	Singles	1st
2005–06	4 November 2005	Sigulda, Latvia	Singles	1st
2005–06	19 November 2005	Cesana, Italy	Singles	2nd
2005–06	9 December 2005	Calgary, Canada	Singles	1st
2005–06	16 December 2005	Lake Placid, United States	Singles	3rd
2005–06	28 January 2006	Oberhof, Germany	Singles	3rd
2006–07	18 November 2006	Cesana, Italy	Singles	2nd
2006–07	16 December 2006	Nagano, Japan	Singles	2nd
2006–07	6 January 2007	Königssee, Germany	Singles	1st
2006–07	10 February 2007	Winterberg, Germany	Singles	3rd
2006–07	10 February 2007	Winterberg, Germany	Team Relay	2nd
2006–07	17 February 2007	Sigulda, Latvia	Singles	3rd
2007–08	5 January 2008	Königssee, Germany	Singles	1st
2007–08	2 February 2008	Altenberg, Germany	Singles	3rd
2007–08	14 February 2008	Sigulda, Latvia	Singles	2nd
2007–08	16 February 2008	Sigulda, Latvia	Singles	1st
2008–09	6 December 2008	Sigulda, Latvia	Singles	1st
2008–09	13 February 2009	Calgary, Canada	Singles	3rd
2009–10	20 November 2009	Calgary, Canada	Singles	3rd
2009–10	5 December 2009	Altenberg, Germany	Singles	3rd
2009–10	12 December 2009	Lillehammer, Norway	Singles	1st
2009–10	2 January 2010	Königssee, Germany	Singles	1st
2009–10	9 January 2010	Winterberg, Germany	Singles	2nd
2010–11	5 January 2011	Königssee, Germany	Singles	2nd
2010–11	22 January 2011	Altenberg, Germany	Singles	3rd
2010–11	22 January 2011	Altenberg, Germany	Team Relay	2nd
2010–11	12 February 2011	Paramonovo, Russia	Singles	1st
2010–11	19 February 2011	Sigulda, Latvia	Team Relay	2nd
2010–11	19 February 2011	Sigulda, Latvia	Team Relay	1st
2011–12	26 November 2011	Igls, Austria	Team Relay	3rd
2011–12	9 December 2011	Whistler, Canada	Team Relay	3rd
2011–12	5 January 2012	Königssee, Germany	Team Relay	3rd
2012–13	8 December 2012	Altenberg, Germany	Team Relay	3rd
2012–13	15 December 2012	Sigulda, Latvia	Singles	1st
2012–13	15 December 2012	Sigulda, Latvia	Team Relay	3rd
2012–13	5 January 2013	Königssee, Germany	Singles	2nd
2012–13	23 February 2013	Sochi, Russia	Singles	2nd
2012–13	23 February 2013	Sochi, Russia	Team Relay	2nd
2013–14	18 January 2014	Altenberg, Germany	Singles	2nd
2013–14	18 January 2014	Altenberg, Germany	Team Relay	1st

=== Season titles ===
- 1 titles – (1 singles)

Season	Discipline
2005	Men's singles

== See also ==
- List of athletes with the most appearances at Olympic Games
