= Steffi Sieger =

German luger (born 1988)

Stefanie "Steffi" Sieger (born 9 March 1988 in Berchtesgaden) is a German luger who has competed since 1999. She finished 12th in the 2008–09 Luge World Cup.
