= David Möller =

German luger (born 1982)

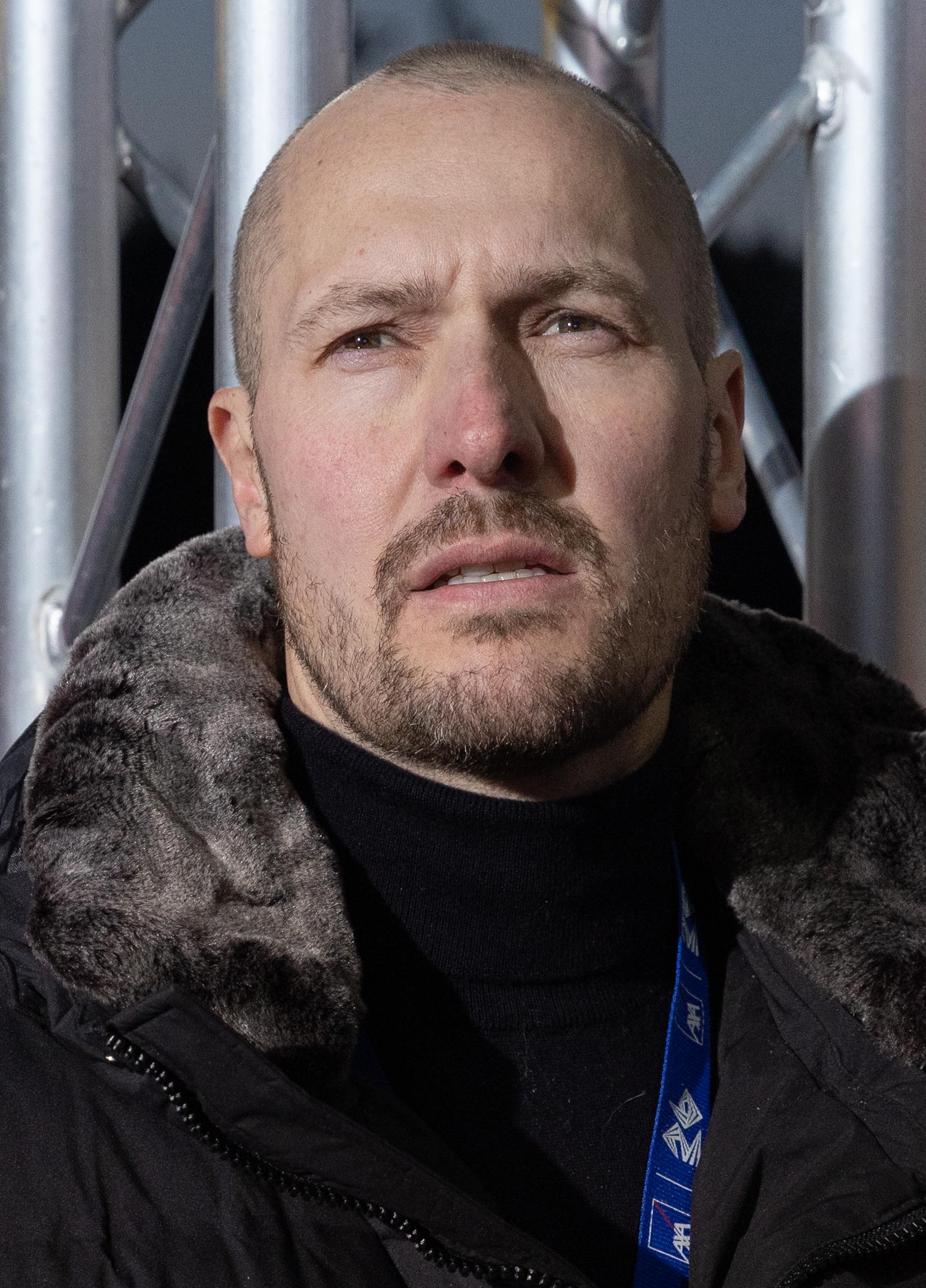
- Möller in 2026

Personal information
- Born: 13 January 1982 (age 44) Sonneberg, East Germany
- Height: 1.88 m (6 ft 2 in)
- Weight: 91 kg (winter); 85 kg (187 lb)(summer)
- Website: www.rennrodeln.com

Sport
- Country: Germany
- Sport: Luge
- Event: Men's singles
- Club: RRV Sonneberg/Schalkau
- Turned pro: 2001
- Coached by: Bernhard Glass

Achievements and titles
- Olympic finals: 2nd place, silver medalist(s)
Medal record
Men's luge
Representing Germany
Olympic Games
Silver medal – second place	2010 Vancouver	Men's singles
World Championships
Gold medal – first place	2004 Nagano	Men's singles
Gold medal – first place	2004 Nagano	Mixed team
Gold medal – first place	2007 Igls	Men's singles
Gold medal – first place	2007 Igls	Mixed team
Silver medal – second place	2008 Oberhof	Men's singles
Bronze medal – third place	2005 Park City	Men's singles
World Cup Championships
Silver medal – second place	2005–06	Men's singles
Silver medal – second place	2006–07	Men's singles
Silver medal – second place	2007–08	Men's singles
Silver medal – second place	2008–09	Men's singles
Bronze medal – third place	2003–04	Men's singles
Bronze medal – third place	2011–12	Men's singles
Bronze medal – third place	2012–13	Men's singles
European Championships
Gold medal – first place	2006 Winterberg	Mixed team
Silver medal – second place	2004 Oberhof	Men's singles
Bronze medal – third place	2006 Winterberg	Men's singles
Bronze medal – third place	2008 Cesena	Men's singles
German Championships
Gold medal – first place	2006	Men's singles
Gold medal – first place	2007	Men's singles
Bronze medal – third place	2009 Königssee	Men's singles
Bronze medal – third place	2010 Winterberg	Men's singles
World Junior Championships
Gold medal – first place	2001 Lillehammer	Men's singles
Gold medal – first place	2002 Innsbruck	Men's singles
Gold medal – first place	2002 Innsbruck	Mixed team
Silver medal – second place	2000 Altenberg	Men's singles

David Möller (born 13 January 1982) is a German former luger who competed from 2001 to 2014. He won six medals at the FIL World Luge Championships with four golds (Men's singles: 2004, 2007; Mixed team: 2004, 2007), one silver (Men's singles: 2008), and one bronze (Men's singles: 2005)

Möller also won four medals at the FIL European Luge Championships with one gold (Mixed team: 2006), one silver (Men's singles: 2004), and two bronzes (Men's singles: 2006, 2008).

He also finished fifth in the men's singles event at the 2006 Winter Olympics in Turin and won the silver medal at the 2010 Winter Olympics in Vancouver.

Möller's best Luge World Cup overall finish was second three times (2005–06, 2006–07, 2007–08).

On 18 January 2009, Möller suffered a cruciate ligament rupture while training in Oberhof. He underwent surgery for the rupture in Munich at the end of February. Möller underwent physical rehabilitation in early 2009 to prepare for the 2009–10 Luge World Cup and Winter Olympics in Vancouver to which he qualified.

After he competed at the 2014 Winter Olympics in Sochi, his third Games, he announced his retirement from competition.

Outside of luge, he works for the German Federal Police.
