= FIL European Luge Championships 2004 =

The FIL European Luge Championships 2004 took place in Oberhof, Germany for the third time having hosted the event previously in 1979 and 1998. The number of teams per nation in the mixed team event is reduced from two to one starting at these championships.

== Medalists ==
| Event | Gold | | Silver | | Bronze | |
|---|---|---|---|---|---|---|
| Men's singles | Armin Zöggeler; Italy | 1:28.779 | David Möller; Germany | 1:28.937 | Jaroslav Slávik; Slovakia | 1:29.130 |
| Women's singles | Silke Kraushaar; Germany | 1:22.995 | Tatjana Hüfner; Germany | 1:23.161 | Sylke Otto; Germany | 1:23.376 |
| Doubles | Germany; Steffen Skel; Steffen Wöller | 1:22.633 | Italy; Christian Oberstolz; Patrick Gruber | 1:22.855 | Austria; Andreas Linger; Wolfgang Linger | 1:23.101 |
| Mixed team | Germany; Jan Eichhorn; Silke Kraushaar; Steffen Skel / Steffen Wöller | 2:08.035 | Italy; Armin Zöggeler; Anastasia Oberstolz-Antonova; Christian Oberstolz / Patrick Gruber | 2:08.508 | Austria; Martin Abentung; Veronika Halder; Andreas Linger / Wolfgang Linger | 2:08.783 |

== Medal table ==
* Host nation (Germany)

| Rank | Nation | Gold | Silver | Bronze | Total |
|---|---|---|---|---|---|
| 1 | Germany* | 3 | 2 | 1 | 6 |
| 2 | Italy | 1 | 2 | 0 | 3 |
| 3 | Austria | 0 | 0 | 2 | 2 |
| 4 | Slovakia | 0 | 0 | 1 | 1 |
| Totals (4 entries) | | 4 | 4 | 4 | 12 |
