= Martin Abentung =

Austrian luger (born 1981)

Medal record

Luge

Representing Austria

World Championships
Silver medal – second place	2008 Oberhof	Mixed team

European Championships
Silver medal – second place	2008 Cesana	Mixed team
Bronze medal – third place	2004 Oberhof	Mixed team

Martin Abentung (born March 27, 1981) is an Austrian-born luger who competed from 1999 to 2010. He won a silver medal in the mixed team event at the 2008 FIL World Luge Championships in Oberhof, Germany. His best individual finish was tenth in the men's singles event at those same championships.

Abentung also won two medals in the mixed team event at the FIL European Luge Championships with a silver in 2008 and a bronze in 2004. His best individual finish was fifth in the men's singles event at Cesana in 2008.
