= Sebastian Schmidt (luger) =

German luger (born 1978)

Medal record

Luge

Representing Germany

European Championships
Silver medal – second place	2006 Winterberg	Men's doubles

Sebastian Schmidt (born 1 February 1978) is a German luger who competed from 1998 to 2007. He won the silver medal in the men's doubles event at the 2006 FIL European Luge Championships in Winterberg, Germany.
