= Liliya Ludan =

Ukrainian luger (born 1969)

Liliya Anatoliyvna Ludan (Ukrainian: Лілія Анатоліївна Лудан; born 2 June 1969 in Kyiv) is a Ukrainian luger who has competed since 1985. Competing at the Winter Olympics, she earned her best finish of sixth in the women's singles event both in 2002 and in 2006. Ludan is a member of the Kolos Sports Society.

Ludan's best finish at the FIL World Luge Championships was seventh in the women's singles event at Sigulda in 2003. Her best finish at the FIL European Luge Championships was fifth in the women's singles event at Altenberg in 2002.

Ludan carried the Ukrainian flag during the opening ceremony of the 2010 Winter Olympics.

Olympic Games
Preceded by Nataliya Yakushenko	Flagbearer for Ukraine; Vancouver 2010	Succeeded by Valentyna Shevchenko
