= Dan Joye =

Venezuelan-born American luger

Personal information
- Nationality: American
- Born: February 19, 1985 (age 41) San Tomé, Anzoátegui, Venezuela
- Home town: Carmel, New York, U.S.
- Height: 5 ft 7 in (170 cm)

Sport
- Country: United States
- Sport: Luge
- Event: Doubles

Dan Joye (born February 19, 1985) is a Venezuelan-born American luger who has competed since 1995. Competing in two Winter Olympics, he earned his best finish of sixth in the men's doubles event at Vancouver in 2010.

Joye's best finish at the FIL World Luge Championships was sixth in the men's doubles event twice (2005, 2009).

Joye resides in San Jose, California and partnered with former singles luger Christian Niccum for the 2007-08 World Cup season.
