= Anna Orlova =

Latvian luger (born 1972)

Medal record

Luge

Representing Latvia

World Championships
| Silver medal – second place | 2003 Sigulda | Mixed team |

European Championships
| Gold medal – first place | 2010 Sigulda | Mixed team |
| Bronze medal – third place | 2006 Winterberg | Mixed team |

Anna Orlova (born 23 August 1972 in Riga) is a retired Latvian luger who competed at six Winter Olympics between 1992 and 2010. She won the silver medal in the mixed team event at the 2003 FIL World Luge Championships in Sigulda, Latvia and finished fourth in the women's singles event at those same championships.

Orlova also won two medals in the mixed team event at the FIL European Luge Championships with a gold in 2010 and a bronze in 2006. She had her best individual finish in the European championships of sixth in 2010.

Her best finish at the Winter Olympics was seventh in the women's singles event at Turin in 2006. She came eleventh in the same event in 2010.

She is one of three Latvians to compete in at least six Olympic Games. The others are biathlete Ilmārs Bricis (also six Winter Olympics) and shooter Afanasijs Kuzmins (eight summer Olympics). She is the first athlete to compete in Luge at six Olympic Games (Italian Gerda Weissensteiner competed at four Olympics in Luge and two in Bobsleigh).

== See also ==
- List of athletes with the most appearances at Olympic Games
