= Meaghan Simister =

Canadian luger

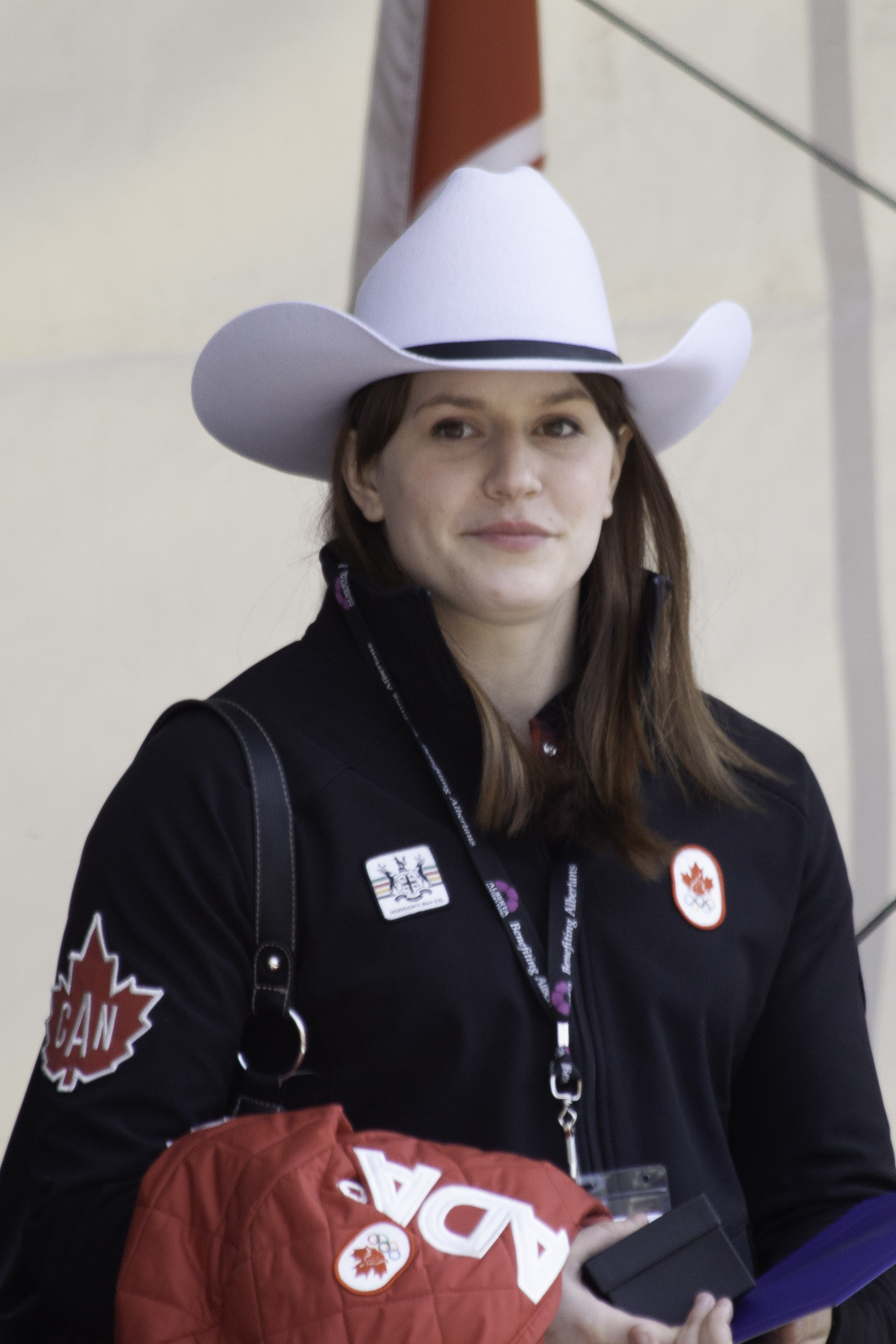

Personal information
- Born: November 10, 1986 (age 39) Regina, Saskatchewan, Canada

Sport
- Sport: Luge

Meaghan Simister (born November 10, 1986, in Regina, Saskatchewan) is a Canadian Olympic luger who has competed since 2003.

In the 2005-2006, 2006-2007 and 2007-2008 seasons, Simister placed second in Canadian Championship competition. At 2009-2010 Canadian Championships she placed third.

Simister's best finish at the FIL World Luge Championships was ninth in the women's singles event at Oberhof in 2008.

In the 2009-2010 Season she placed tenth at the World Cup in Altenberg, Germany, qualifying for the 2010 Winter Olympics where she finished 25th. http://olympic.ca/team-canada/meaghan-simister/

Her first Olympics were the 2006 Winter Olympics in Turin. During the Olympics on February 14, she sustained minor injuries on the luge track, in the third of four runs, when she went high on one of the corners of the track.

== Personal life ==
Simister was one of about 20 athletes in the 2006 Winter Olympics to have attended high school at the National Sport School in Calgary, Alberta.
