= Stefan Höhener =

Swiss luger (born 1980)

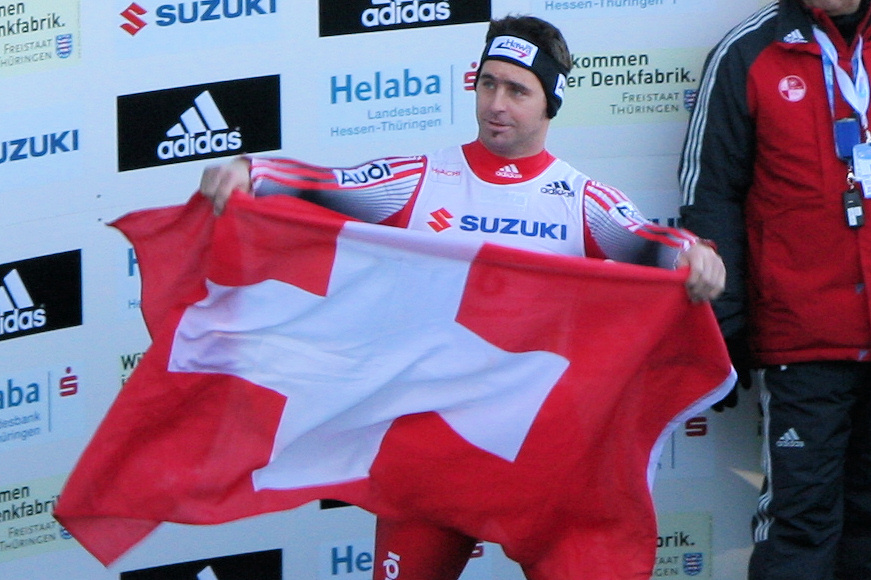
- Höhener at the FIL World Luge Championships 2008 in Oberhof, Germany

Personal information
- Born: 13 June 1980 (age 46) Gais AR, Switzerland

Sport
- Country: Switzerland
- Sport: Luge

Stefan Höhener (born 13 June 1980 in Gais AR) is a Swiss luger who has competed since 1999. Competing in three Winter Olympics, he earned his best finish of 13th in the men's singles event at Salt Lake City in 2002.

Höhener's best finish at the FIL World Luge Championships was fifth in the men's singles event at Igls in 2007. His best finish at the FIL European Luge Championships was seventh in the men's singles event at Cesana in 2008.

From 2014 to her retirement in 2018, Höhener coached fellow Swiss luger Martina Kocher.
