= Reinhold Rainer =

Italian luger (born 1973)

Reinhold Rainer (born 29 August 1973 in Sterzing) is an Italian luger who has competed since 1994. Competing in four Winter Olympics, he earned his best finish of eighth in the men's singles event both in 1998 and in 2006.

Rainer's best finish at the FIL World Luge Championships in the men's singles event was sixth twice (2004, 2007).

His best overall Luge World Cup finish was third in men's singles in 2006-7.
