= FIL European Luge Championships 2006 =

The FIL European Luge Championships 2006 took place in Winterberg, Germany for the fourth time having hosted the event previously in 1982, 1992, and 2000.

== Medalists ==
Event	Gold		Silver		Bronze	
Men's singles	Albert Demtschenko; Russia	1:48.918	Armin Zöggeler; Italy	1:49.108	David Möller; Germany	1:49.458
Women's singles	Silke Kraushaar; Germany	1:30.607	Tatjana Hüfner; Germany	1:30.761	Barbara Niedernhuber; Germany	1:30.936
Doubles	Germany; Patric Leitner; Alexander Resch	1:29.824	Germany; Sebastian Schmidt; André Forker	1:29.886	Italy; Christian Oberstolz; Patrick Gruber	1:29.924
Mixed team	Germany; Patric Leitner / Alexander Resch; Silke Kraushaar; David Möller	2:24.552	Italy; Christian Oberstolz / Patrick Gruber; Anastasia Oberstolz-Antonova; Armin Zöggeler	2:25.236	Latvia; Juris Šics / Andris Šics; Anna Orlova; Mārtiņš Rubenis	2:25.565

== Medal table ==
* Host nation (Germany)

Rank	Nation	Gold	Silver	Bronze	Total
1	Germany*	3	2	2	7
2	Russia	1	0	0	1
3	Italy	0	2	1	3
4	Latvia	0	0	1	1
Totals (4 entries)		4	4	4	12
