= Ewelina Staszulonek =

Polish luger (born 1985)

Ewelina Staszulonek (born 17 February 1985 in Jarosław, Poland) is a Polish luger who has competed since 2003. Competing in two Winter Olympics, she earned her best finish of eighth in the women's singles event at Vancouver in 2010.

Staszulonek's best finish at the FIL World Luge Championships was 13th in the women's singles event at Lake Placid, New York, in 2009. Her best finish at the FIL European Luge Championships was 14th in the women's singles event twice (2004, 2010).
