= Stanislav Mikheev =

Russian luger (born 1989)

Stanislav Mikheev (born 21 May 1989) is a Russian luger who has competed since the mid-2000s. His best finish at the FIL European Luge Championships was sixth in the men's doubles event at Sigulda in 2010.

Mikheev qualified for the 2010 Winter Olympics where he finished 14th.
