= Hans Peter Fischnaller =

Italian luger (born 1985)

Hans Peter Fischnaller (born 9 July 1985 in Sterzing, Italy) is an Italian luger who has been competing since 2004. His best Luge World Cup season finish was 11th in men's doubles in 2004–05.

Fischnaller's best finish at the FIL World Luge Championships was 12th in the men's doubles event at Oberhof in 2008. His best finish at the FIL European Luge Championships was ninth at Winterberg in 2006.
