= Regan Lauscher =

Canadian luger (born 1980)

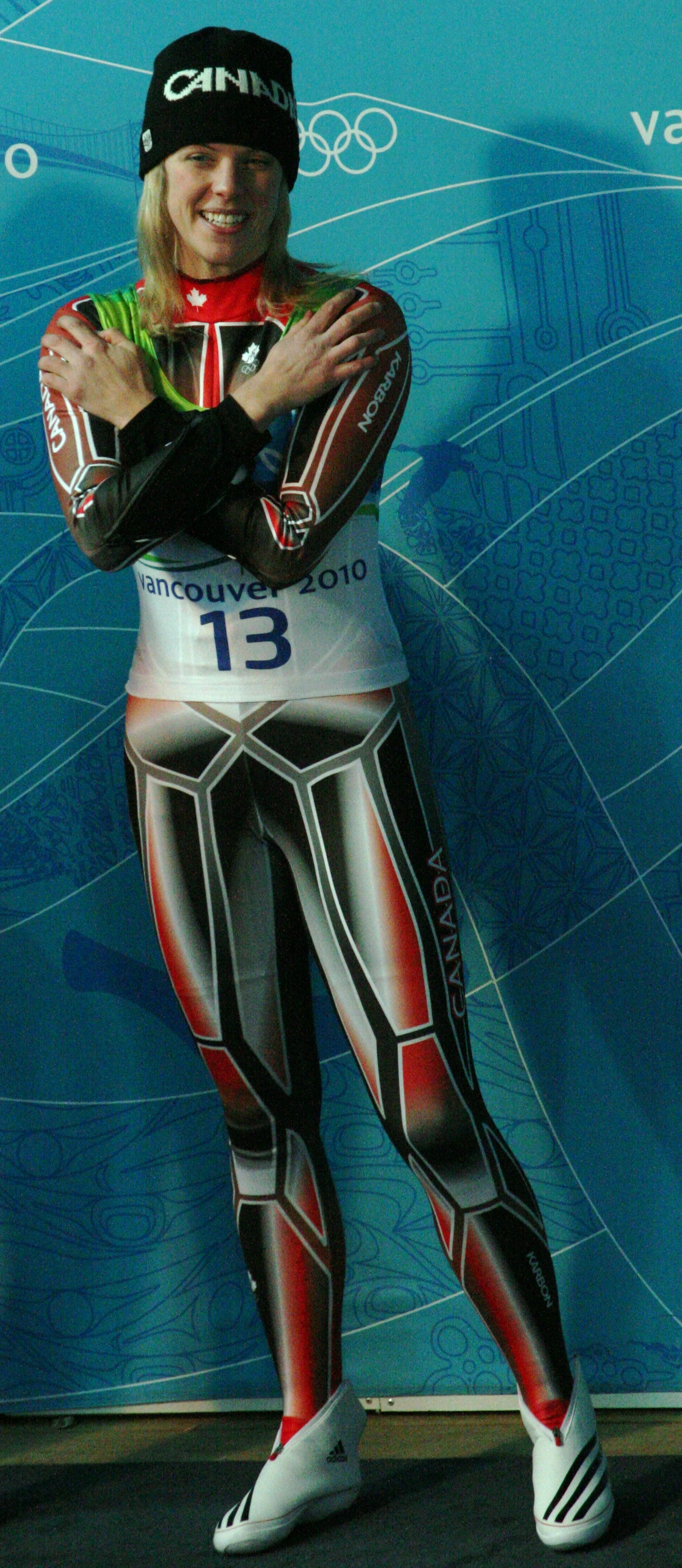
- Lauscher at the 2010 Winter Olympics

Personal information
- Nationality: Canadian
- Born: February 21, 1980 (age 45); Saskatoon, Saskatchewan

Sport
- Sport: Luge

Regan Lauscher (born February 21, 1980, in Saskatoon, Saskatchewan) is a Canadian luger. Competing in three Winter Olympics, she earned her best finish of tenth in the women's singles event at Turin in 2006.

Her second-place finish at the Luge World competitions at Lake Placid, New York, in 2004 was the best ever time by a Canadian female luger. Lauscher's best finish at the FIL World Luge Championships was ninth in the women's singles event at Park City, Utah, in 2005.

During the 2006 Winter Olympics, Lauscher wrote an online journal for the Canadian Broadcasting Corporation about her views and actions during those games. Prior to the 2006 games, she had earned her journalism degree from Mount Royal College.

Lauscher had surgeries on both of her shoulders in May 2008 and resumed training in October.
