= Jan-Armin Eichhorn =

German luger (born 1981)

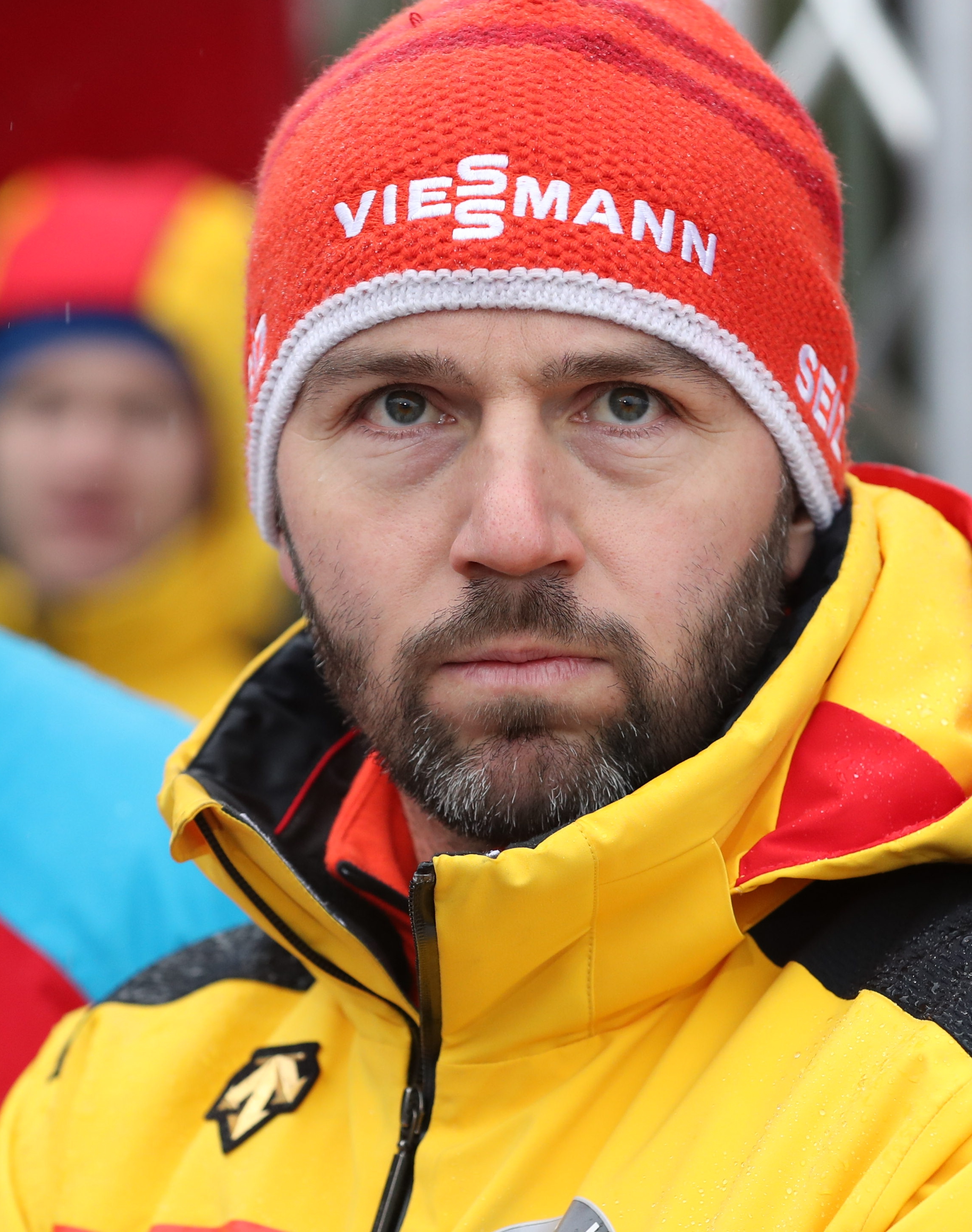
- Jan Eichhorn in 2020

Medal record

Luge

Representing Germany

World Championships
Bronze medal – third place	2007 Igls	Men's singles

European Championships
Gold medal – first place	2004 Oberhof	Mixed team

Jan-Armin Eichhorn (born 8 May 1981 in Sonneberg) is a German luger who has competed since 1999. He won the bronze medal in the men's singles event at the 2007 FIL World Luge Championships in Igls, Austria.

Eichhorn won a gold medal in the mixed team event at the 2004 FIL European Luge Championships in Oberhof, Germany. His best individual finish was fourth in the men's singles event at those same games.

He also finished sixth in the men's singles at the 2006 Winter Olympics in Turin.
