= Christian Niccum =

American luger (born 1978)

Christian Elza Niccum (born January 27, 1978) is a retired American luger who has competed since 1996 on the World Cup tour. He was the alternate in 1998, coached for Canada in 2002, and finished 23rd in the men's singles event at the 2006 Winter Olympics in Turin. Four years later in Vancouver, he finished sixth in the men's doubles event. At the 2014 Winter Olympics in Sochi, Russia he finished 6th as part of the US team in the team relay and finished 11th in the doubles with Jayson Terdiman.

Niccum's best finish at the FIL World Luge Championships was ninth in the men's singles event at Park City, Utah in 2005. In doubles his best finish was a 6th place in 2008 in Oberhof, Germany.

Niccum is a 4 time Junior World Champion with teammate Matt McClain (1995,1996,1997,1998)

Niccum was the youngest double rider to win a World Cup race in Lillihammer, Norway in December 1996. He then went on to win 2 more in 1998. In 2011 Niccum set a new record when he finished third in a race in Winterberg, Germany, for the longest gap between World Cup podium finishes, at 12 years.

Niccum retired from the sport after the 2014 Winter Olympics.

Born in Minneapolis, Minnesota, Niccum resides in Woodinville, Washington when not involved in luge.
