= Daniel Pfister =

Austrian luger (born 1986)

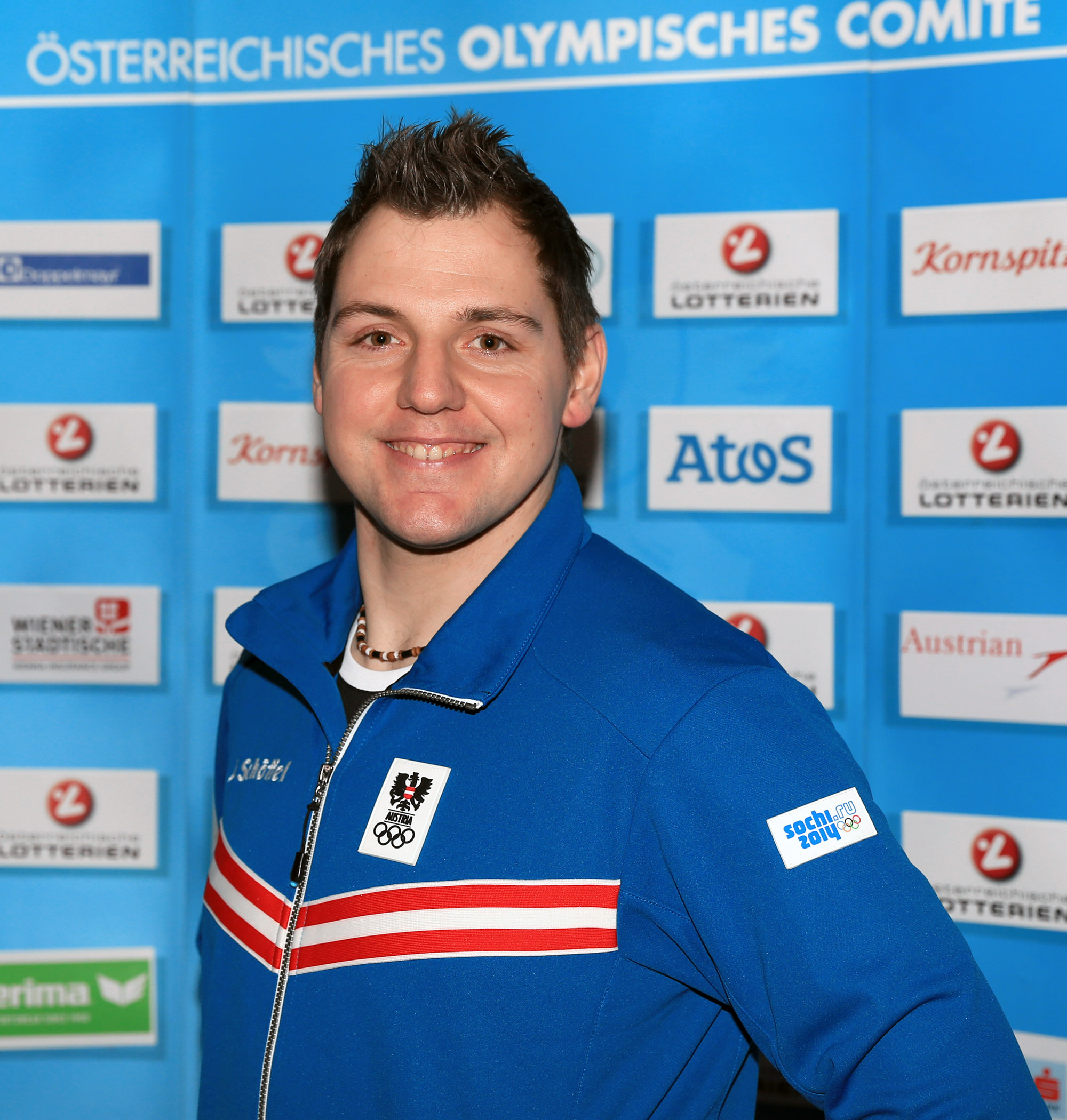

Medal record

Luge

Representing Austria

World Championships
Silver medal – second place	2009 Lake Placid	Mixed team
Bronze medal – third place	2007 Igls	Mixed team
Bronze medal – third place	2009 Lake Placid	Men's singles

European Championships
Bronze medal – third place	2010 Sigulda	Men's singles

Daniel Pfister (born 7 December 1986 in Schwaz) is an Austrian luger who has competed since 2003. He won three medals at the FIL World Luge Championships with a silver (Mixed team: 2009 and two bronzes (men's singles: 2009, mixed team: 2007).

Pfister also won a bronze in the men's singles event at the FIL European Luge Championships 2010 in Sigulda. He also competed in three Winter Olympics, earning his best finish of sixth in the men's singles event at Vancouver in 2010.
