= Andriy Kis =

Ukrainian luger (born 1982)

Andriy Kis (born 27 May 1982 in Lviv) is a Ukrainian luger who has competed since 2003. Competing in two Winter Olympics, he earned his best finish of 14th in the men's doubles event at Turin in 2006.

Kis's best finish at the FIL World Luge Championships in the men's double event was 14th twice (2008, 2009). His best finish at the FIL European Luge Championships was ninth in the men's doubles event at Sigulda in 2010.
