= Maija Tīruma =

Latvian luger

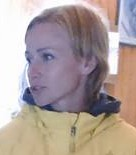
- Tīruma in 2014

Personal information
- Born: 28 November 1983 (age 42) Riga, Latvia
- Height: 173 cm (5 ft 8 in)
- Weight: 67 kg (148 lb)

Sport
- Sport: Luge
Medal record
Representing Latvia
World Championships
Bronze medal – third place	2008 Oberhof	Mixed team
Bronze medal – third place	2009 Lake Placid	Mixed team
European Championships
Gold medal – first place	2008 Cesana	Mixed team

Maija Tīruma (born 28 November 1983) is a Latvian former luger who competed from 2000 to 2013. She won two bronze medals in the mixed team relay event at the FIL World Luge Championships (2008, 2009). Tīruma also won a gold medal in the mixed team relay event at the 2008 FIL European Luge Championships in Cesana, Italy and finished seventh in the women's singles event at the same championships. Competing in three Winter Olympics, she earned her best finish of ninth in the women's singles event at Vancouver in 2010.

Since 2013, she is the head coach of the Bobsleigh, Luge and Skeleton Club of la Plagne in France. Her younger sister Elīza Cauce is also an Olympic former luger.
