= Veronika Halder =

Austrian luger (born 1980)

Medal record

Luge

Representing Austria

European Championships
Silver medal – second place	2008 Cesana	Mixed team
Silver medal – second place	2010 Sigulda	Mixed team
Bronze medal – third place	2004 Oberhof	Mixed team
Bronze medal – third place	2008 Cesana	Women's singles

Veronika Halder (born 14 October 1980 in Hall in Tirol) is an Austrian luger who has competed since 2000. She won four medals at the FIL European Luge Championships with two silvers (Mixed team: 2008, 2010) and two bronzes (Women's singles: 2008, Mixed team: 2004).

Halder competed in two Winter Olympics, earning her best finish of fifth in the women's singles event at Turin in 2006. Her best finish at the FIL World Luge Championships was fifth in the women's singles event at Nagano in 2004.
