= Chris Moffat =

Canadian luger (born 1979)

Personal information
- Full name: Christopher Moffat
- Born: September 22, 1979 (age 46) Calgary, Alberta, Canada

Sport
- Country: Canada
- Sport: Luge

Christopher Moffat (born September 22, 1979) is a Canadian luger who has competed since 2000. Competing in three Winter Olympics, he earned his best finish of fifth in the men's doubles event at the Salt Lake City in 2002.

Moffat's best finish at the FIL World Luge Championships was tenth in the men's doubles event at Oberhof, Germany in 2008.

He resides in his hometown of Calgary, Alberta in the offseason.

Moffat had a screw removed from his wrist following a fracture to stabilize it.
