= Mikhail Kuzmich =

Russian luger (born 1982)

Mikhail Sergeyevich Kuzmich (Russian: Михаил Серге́евич Кузмич, born 8 October 1982 in Krasnoyarsk) is a Russian luger who has competed since 1999. Competing in three Winter Olympics, he earned his best finish of 11th in the men's doubles event at Turin in 2006.

Kuzmich's best finish at the FIL World Luge Championships was eighth in the men's doubles event at Oberhof in 2008. His best finish at the FIL European Luge Championships was sixth in the men's doubles event at Sigulda in 2010.
