= Bengt Walden =

Swedish-American luger

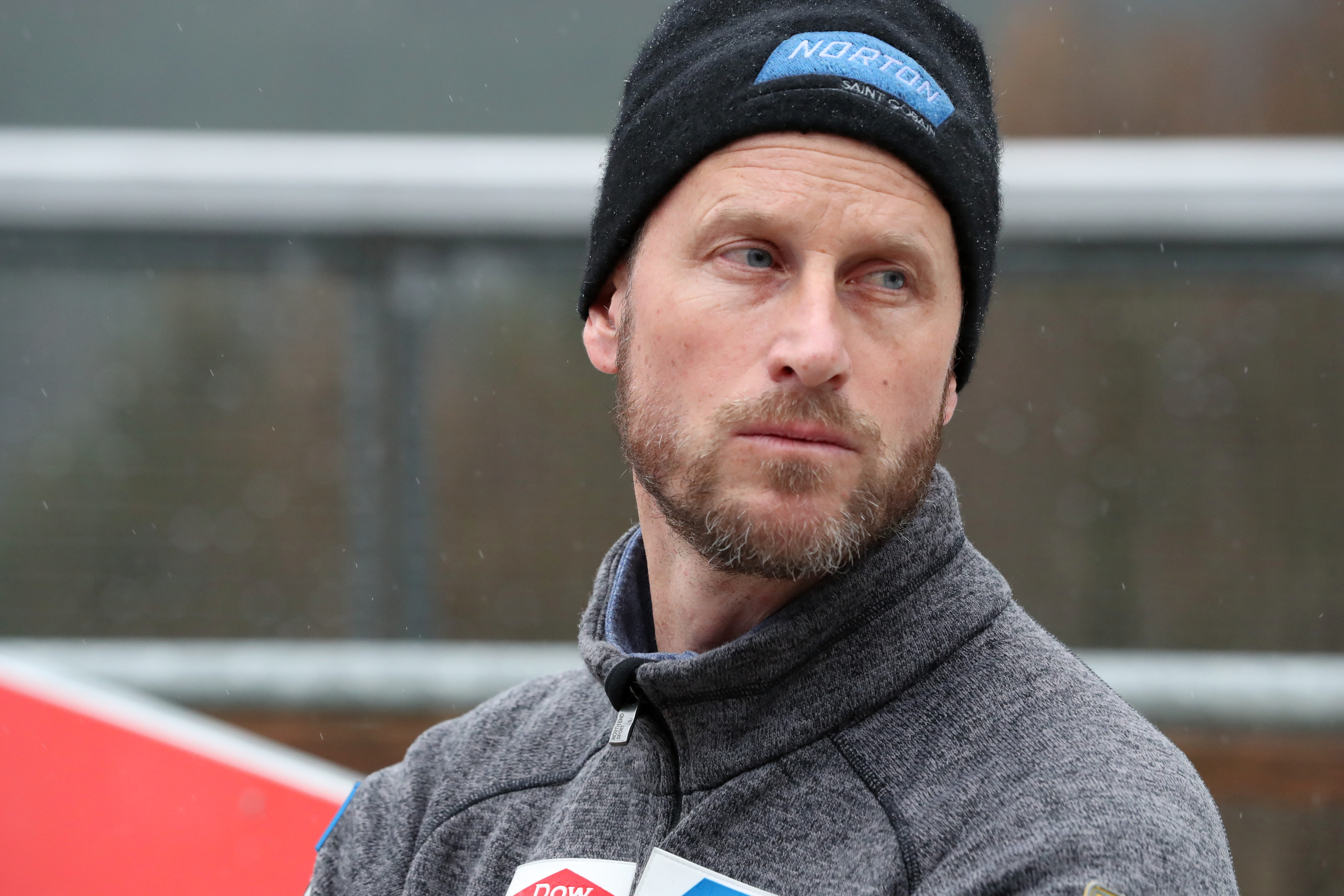
- Walden in 2017

Personal information
- Full name: Bengt Otto Walden
- Born: April 16, 1973 (age 53) Nacka, Sweden

Sport
- Country: Sweden; United States
- Sport: Luge

Bengt Otto Walden (born April 16, 1973 in Nacka) is a retired Swedish-born, American luger who has competed since 1985, internationally since 1988, when he joined the Swedish national team. He married American luger Ashley Hayden in 2006, and joined the United States national team in 2007. He switched his citizenship from Sweden to the United States in 2009 in order to be able to compete as an American at the 2010 Olympics. Walden retired from competition after the 2010-11 season. Subsequently, he was appointed as coach of the Norwegian national luge team.

== Career ==
- Olympics:

He finished 23rd in the men's singles event at the 2002 Winter Olympics in Salt Lake City competing for Sweden. He competed at the 2010 Winter Olympics for the United States, finishing 15th.

- FIL World Luge Championships:

Walden has competed twice for the US in the World Luge Championships, as well as once for the Swedish team. In 2007, he placed 13th, competing for Sweden. Competing for the US, he placed 12th in 2008, and sixth in 2009.
