= Yuriy Hayduk =

Ukrainian luger (born 1985)

Yuriy Hayduk, (Ukrainian: Юрій Гайдук; born 12 July 1985 in Lviv) is a Ukrainian luger who has competed since 2003. Competing in two Winter Olympics, he earned his best finish of 14th in the men's doubles event at Turin in 2006.

Hayduk best finish at the FIL World Luge Championships in the men's double event was 14th twice (2008, 2009). His best finish at the FIL European Luge Championships was ninth in the men's doubles event at Sigulda in 2010.
