= Mike Moffat (luger) =

Canadian luger (born 1982)

Personal information
- Born: 27 July 1982 (age 44) Calgary, Alberta, Canada
- Height: 1.82 m (6 ft 0 in)
- Weight: 80 kg (180 lb)

Sport
- Country: Canada
- Sport: Luge
- Club: Calgary Luge Club

Mike Moffat (born 27 July 1982) is a Canadian luger who has been competing since 1990. Competing in three Winter Olympics, he earned his best Olympic finish of 7th in 2010 (Vancouver). Other Olympic results include 9th in 2006 (Turin) and 11th in 2002 (Salt Lake).

Moffat's best finish at the FIL World Luge Championships was sixth in the men's doubles event at Calgary in 2001.
