= Cesana Pariol =

2006 Winter Olympics venue

Coordinates: 44.952346°N 6.805147°E

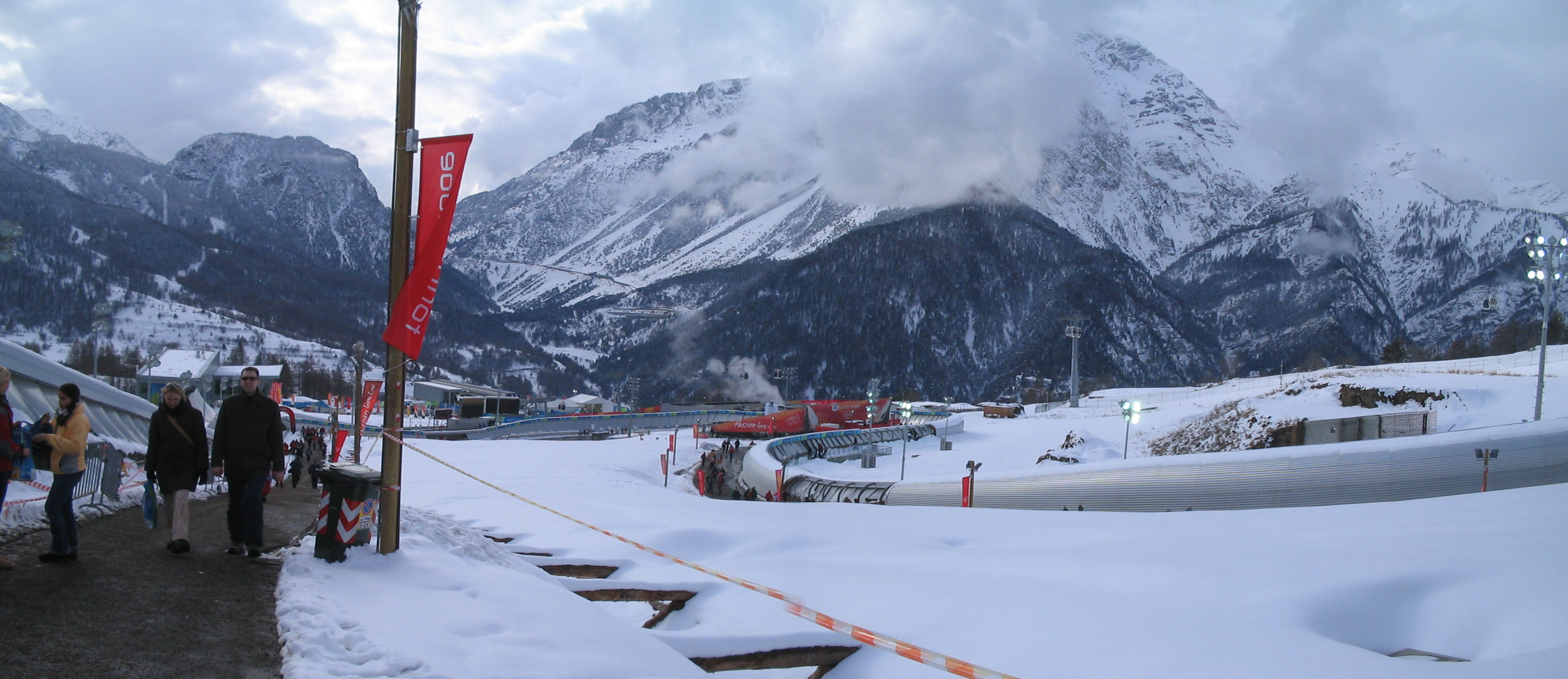
Picture of turns 15 through 19 (right to left) of Cesana Pariol during the 2006 Winter Olympics

Cesana Pariol was the venue for bobsleigh, luge and skeleton during the 2006 Winter Olympics in Turin, Italy. The track, built for the Games, is located in Cesana Torinese. The €110 million venue had a capacity of 7,130 spectators, of whom 3,624 were seated. The track was closed in 2011 and has been abandoned since then. The track is scheduled to be demolished in summer 2026.

The track was considered for renovation for the 2026 Winter Olympics to host the sliding events, but the plans were turned down and a new track was built in Cortina d'Ampezzo for €119 million euros.

== Construction details ==
The track was constructed with about 54 miles (87 km) of ammonia refrigeration pipes to help form ice on the track for proper sliding. Numerous sensors located along the track ensured that the ice's thickness was kept between 5 and 10 cm (2 and 4 in) to keep the track properly smooth during competitions.

The construction costs of the venue reached 110 million euros.

== History ==
During construction of the track prior to the 2006 games, there was concern that the track would be completed in time for homologation. An archaeological find (a small part of a Roman ruins) during construction slowed progress until the remains were excavated (near the current Turn 11).

The track was completed on end of 2004. In January 2005, the FIBT and FIL held their homologation events at the track. The FIBT had no issue when they ran their events during the weekend of 21–23 January 2005. The following week, the FIL ran their events, and had several crashes. Included in the crashes were Austria's Wolfgang Linger (broken ankle and calfbone), Brazil's Renato Mizoguchi (medically induced coma), and the U.S. Virgin Islands' Anne Abernathy (collarbone). During the summer of 2005, discussions were held among TOROC (the organizer of the 2006 Games), FIBT President Robert H. Storey (Canada), and FIL President Josef Fendt (Germany) about refitting the track for safety reasons. An agreement was reached by all three, and turns 16 through 18 were modified as such. The track was finally modified in late 2005 in time for homologation. Test runs done by Italy's Armin Zöggeler in late October 2005 led to the track being homologated on 31 October 2005 after it had been approved by former German national team coach Josef Lenz and FIL track commission chair Klaus Bonsack.

Cesana Pariol is now part of the complex called Torino Olympic Park. Post-Olympic usage for the tracks includes bobsleigh and luge rides for the public.

In October 2009, problems with early refrigeration of the track led the Bob- und Schlittenverband für Deutschland in Germany to lend support of short-order auxiliary services for foreign teams on such short notice. Starting 16 October, Italy and Japan's teams trained at the track in Winterberg while Austria's team trained at Königssee's track.

The track was scheduled to host events in 2011–12, but was shut down due to economic costs. After pressure from the FIBT and FIL in early 2012, the track was scheduled to run in 2012-13 only to be shut down again. In October 2012, the track was ordered to be dismantled by Cesana officials. The 45 tons of ammonia was moved from the track's refrigeration for other uses within the Turin region. However, during the 2014 Winter Olympics, President of the CONI, Giovanni Malagò, expressed the intention to ensure new investments to keep the track open.

The track was considered for renovation for the 2026 Winter Olympics to host the sliding events, as CONI was having difficulty finding a suitable venue. The plans were turned down after an Italian construction company submitted a bid of €81.6 million to rebuild the Eugenio Monti Olympic Track in Cortina d'Ampezzo used in the 1956 Winter Olympics. However, the cost reached €119 million, as the project ultimately involved constructing a completely new track on the site of the old one.

== Statistics ==
Physical statistics
Sport	Length of track (meters)	Number of turns
Bobsleigh, skeleton, and luge - men's singles	1435	19 (11 left and 8 right)
Luge - women's singles and men's doubles	1233	17 (9 left and 8 right)

The venue includes a vertical drop of 114 meters from start to finish.

Turns
Turn Number	Name	Reason named
1.	Champlas	Local town near the track.
2.	Gancio	Italian for "Hook"
3.	Il Muro	Italian for "The Wall". Women's singles and men's double luge have their start house after this turn.
4., 5.	Gemelli	Italian for "Twins".
6., 7., 8.	Toro	Italian for "Bull". Also for the toroid or torus shape of these three turns. It is also an Omega-shaped curve.
9.	Cesana	The comune where the track is located.
10.	Nino Bibbia	1948 Winter Olympics gold medalist in skeleton at St. Moritz. Italy's first gold medalist in bobsled, luge, or skeleton, and its first-ever Winter Olympic medalist.
11.	Museo	Italian for "Museum". An archeological find was found near this turn during track construction.
12., 13.	Chicane	Shape of these curves.
14.	Chaberton	After the Chaberton Mountains that the inside of this curve faces.
15.	Lavatrice	Italian for "Washing machine"
16.	Compressione	Italian for "Compression". From the compressive forces put upon the body during the maneuvering of the sled through the turn.
17.	Paul Hildgartner	Formerly "Senza Nome" ("Without Name" in (in Italian)). Named for luger who won four Winter Olympic, five world championship, and six European championship medals between 1971 and 1988. Among first inductees in FIL Hall of Fame in 2004.
18.	Pariol	The village in Cesana where the track is located.
19.	Eugenio Monti	Six-time Olympic medalist and 10-time bobsled World Champion medalist from 1957 to 1968.

Track records
Sport	Record	Nation - athlete(s)	Date	Time (seconds)
Bobsleigh - two-man	Start	Switzerland - Beat Hefti & Thomas Lamparter	5 December 2009	4.72
Luge - men's singles	Start	David Möller - Germany	29 January 2010	2.457
Luge - men's singles	Track	Albert Demtschenko - Russia	12 February 2006	51.396
Luge - women's singles	Start	Silke Kraushaar - Germany	14 February 2006	4.320
Luge - women's singles	Track	Natalie Geisenberger - Germany	31 January 2010	46.817
Luge - men's doubles	Start	Germany - Tobias Wendl & Tobias Arlt	29 January 2010	4.258
Luge - men's doubles	Track	Italy - Christian Oberstolz & Patrick Gruber	30 January 2010	46.293
Women's skeleton	Track	Shelley Rudman - United Kingdom	4 December 2009	58.71

== Championships hosted ==
- 2006 Winter Olympics
- FIL European Luge Championships: 2008
- FIL World Luge Championships: 2011
