= List of Olympic medalists in luge =

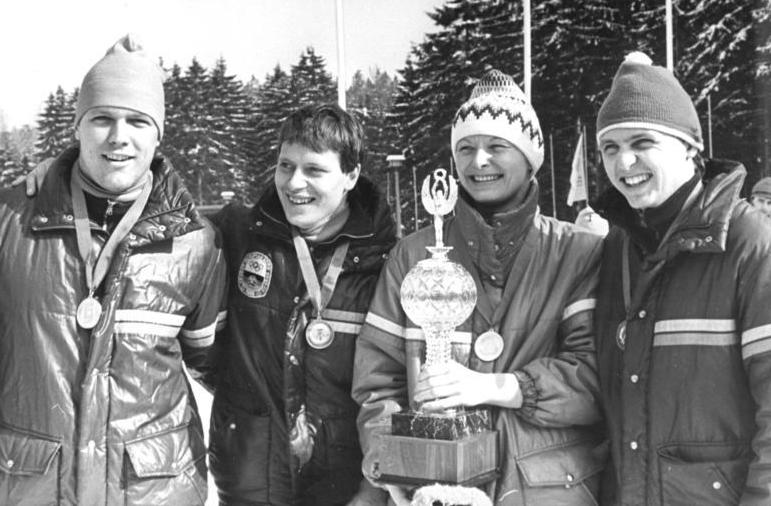
Olympic medalists from East Germany at the 1988 Winter Olympics: Jörg Hoffmann (far left) and Jochen Pietzsch (second from left), doubles champions; Cerstin Schmidt (second from right), women's singles bronze medalist; and Jens Müller (far right), gold medalist in the men's singles.

Luge is one of the eight Olympic sports currently contested at the Winter Olympic Games. It has been a constant presence in the Olympic program since its introduction at the 1964 Winter Olympics in Innsbruck, Austria, in the form of three events: men's singles, women's singles, and doubles. (Note: Technically, the doubles event is considered a mixed event, open for male, female and mixed duos, but since its debut it has been traditionally entered only by male pairs.) A mixed team relay event was contested for the first time at the 2014 Winter Olympics in Sochi.

== History ==
German luger Natalie Geisenberger is the overall medal leader in the sport, having collected a total of seven medals (six gold and one bronze) across the single and relay events. The most successful men are Tobias Arlt and Tobias Wendl who have won six gold medals together in the doubles and relay events. Italian Armin Zöggeler has won the most medals in the singles event with six total (two gold, one silver, and three bronze), during the six Winter Games in which he competed (1994–2014). German luger Georg Hackl was the first Olympian to receive a medal in five consecutive Olympics, from 1988 to 2002, including three consecutive gold medals.

Ortrun Enderlein, representing the United Team of Germany, was the first woman to win the singles event in 1964. She was on the verge of defending her title at the 1968 Grenoble Games, having the best overall time after all the runs, but was disqualified together with fellow countrywomen Anna-Maria Müller (2nd) and Angela Knösel (4th) when it was discovered that the runners in their sleds had been illegally heated before the runs. Müller made up for this by taking the gold medal at the following Games, in Sapporo, Japan.

In 1972, two gold medals were awarded to an East German (Horst Hörnlein and Reinhard Bredow) and an Italian pair (Paul Hildgartner and Walter Plaikner), who finished with exactly the same time. To prevent similar situations in future Olympics, the Fédération Internationale de Luge de Course introduced timing equipment that measured accurately to one thousandth of a second, to replace the old equipment that measured in hundredths of a second.

As of the 2022 Winter Olympics, 156 medals (53 gold, 51 silver, and 52 bronze, with two golds in the 1972 doubles event) have been awarded, representing 12 National Olympic Committees (NOC). German lugers—representing the United Team of Germany (1964), West Germany (1968–1988), East Germany (1968–1988), and Germany (1992–2018)—have dominated this sport, collecting a total of 81 medals. There were seven occasions when a single NOC filled the podium with its athletes and in all of them they were German. After 2018, Germany is the current medal-leading NOC in the sport with 37 medals (18 gold, 10 silver, and 9 bronze), followed by East Germany's 29 medals.

== Medalists ==
=== Men's singles ===
Games	Gold	Silver	Bronze
1964 Innsbruck	Thomas Köhler; United Team of Germany	Klaus Bonsack; United Team of Germany	Hans Plenk; United Team of Germany
1968 Grenoble	Manfred Schmid; Austria	Thomas Köhler; East Germany	Klaus Bonsack; East Germany
1972 Sapporo	Wolfgang Scheidel; East Germany	Harald Ehrig; East Germany	Wolfram Fiedler; East Germany
1976 Innsbruck	Dettlef Günther; East Germany	Josef Fendt; West Germany	Hans Rinn; East Germany
1980 Lake Placid	Bernhard Glass; East Germany	Paul Hildgartner; Italy	Anton Winkler; West Germany
1984 Sarajevo	Paul Hildgartner; Italy	Sergey Danilin; Soviet Union	Valery Dudin; Soviet Union
1988 Calgary	Jens Müller; East Germany	Georg Hackl; West Germany	Yuri Kharchenko; Soviet Union
1992 Albertville	Georg Hackl; Germany	Markus Prock; Austria	Markus Schmidt; Austria
1994 Lillehammer	Georg Hackl; Germany	Markus Prock; Austria	Armin Zöggeler; Italy
1998 Nagano	Georg Hackl; Germany	Armin Zöggeler; Italy	Jens Müller; Germany
2002 Salt Lake City	Armin Zöggeler; Italy	Georg Hackl; Germany	Markus Prock; Austria
2006 Turin	Armin Zöggeler; Italy	Albert Demchenko; Russia	Mārtiņš Rubenis; Latvia
2010 Vancouver	Felix Loch; Germany	David Möller; Germany	Armin Zöggeler; Italy
2014 Sochi	Felix Loch; Germany	Albert Demchenko; Russia	Armin Zöggeler; Italy
2018 Pyeongchang	David Gleirscher; Austria	Chris Mazdzer; United States	Johannes Ludwig; Germany
2022 Beijing	Johannes Ludwig; Germany	Wolfgang Kindl; Austria	Dominik Fischnaller; Italy
2026 Milano Cortina	Max Langenhan; Germany	Jonas Müller; Austria	Dominik Fischnaller; Italy

Medals
Rank	Nation	Gold	Silver	Bronze	Total
1	Germany	7	2	2	11
2	East Germany	4	2	3	9
3	Italy	3	2	5	10
4	Austria	2	4	2	8
5	United Team of Germany	1	1	1	3
6	West Germany	0	2	1	3
7	Russia	0	2	0	2
8	Soviet Union	0	1	2	3
9	United States	0	1	0	1
10	Latvia	0	0	1	1
Total	10 nations	17	17	17	51

=== Women's singles ===
Games	Gold	Silver	Bronze
1964 Innsbruck	Ortrun Enderlein; United Team of Germany	Ilse Geisler; United Team of Germany	Helene Thurner; Austria
1968 Grenoble	Erica Lechner; Italy	Christina Schmuck; West Germany	Angelika Dünhaupt; West Germany
1972 Sapporo	Anna-Maria Müller; East Germany	Ute Rührold; East Germany	Margit Schumann; East Germany
1976 Innsbruck	Margit Schumann; East Germany	Ute Rührold; East Germany	Elisabeth Demleitner; West Germany
1980 Lake Placid	Vera Zozulya; Soviet Union	Melitta Sollmann; East Germany	Ingrīda Amantova; Soviet Union
1984 Sarajevo	Steffi Martin; East Germany	Bettina Schmidt; East Germany	Ute Weiss; East Germany
1988 Calgary	Steffi Walter; East Germany	Ute Oberhoffner; East Germany	Cerstin Schmidt; East Germany
1992 Albertville	Doris Neuner; Austria	Angelika Neuner; Austria	Susi Erdmann; Germany
1994 Lillehammer	Gerda Weissensteiner; Italy	Susi Erdmann; Germany	Andrea Tagwerker; Austria
1998 Nagano	Silke Kraushaar; Germany	Barbara Niedernhuber; Germany	Angelika Neuner; Austria
2002 Salt Lake City	Sylke Otto; Germany	Barbara Niedernhuber; Germany	Silke Kraushaar; Germany
2006 Turin	Sylke Otto; Germany	Silke Kraushaar; Germany	Tatjana Hüfner; Germany
2010 Vancouver	Tatjana Hüfner; Germany	Nina Reithmayer; Austria	Natalie Geisenberger; Germany
2014 Sochi	Natalie Geisenberger; Germany	Tatjana Hüfner; Germany	Erin Hamlin; United States
2018 Pyeongchang	Natalie Geisenberger; Germany	Dajana Eitberger; Germany	Alex Gough; Canada
2022 Beijing	Natalie Geisenberger; Germany	Anna Berreiter; Germany	Tatiana Ivanova; ROC
2026 Milan Cortina	Julia Taubitz; Germany	Elīna Ieva Bota; Latvia	Ashley Farquharson; United States

Medals
Rank	Nation	Gold	Silver	Bronze	Total
1	Germany	8	7	4	19
2	East Germany	4	5	3	12
3	Italy	2	0	0	2
4	Austria	1	2	3	6
5	United Team of Germany	1	1	0	2
6	Soviet Union	1	0	1	2
7	West Germany	0	1	2	3
8	Latvia	0	1	0	1
9	United States	0	0	2	1
10	Canada	0	0	1	1
10	ROC	0	0	1	1
Total	10 nations	17	17	17	51

=== Men’s doubles ===
Games	Gold	Silver	Bronze
1964 Innsbruck	Josef Feistmantl and Manfred Stengl (AUT)	Reinhold Senn and Helmut Thaler (AUT)	Walter Ausserdorfer and Sigisfredo Mair (ITA)
1968 Grenoble	Klaus Bonsack and Thomas Köhler (GDR)	Manfred Schmid and Ewald Walch (AUT)	Wolfgang Winkler and Fritz Nachmann (FRG)
1972 Sapporo	Horst Hörnlein and Reinhard Bredow (GDR); Paul Hildgartner and Walter Plaikner (ITA)	None awarded	Klaus Bonsack and Wolfram Fiedler (GDR)
1976 Innsbruck	Hans Rinn and Norbert Hahn (GDR)	Hans Brandner and Balthasar Schwarm (FRG)	Rudolf Schmid and Franz Schachner (AUT)
1980 Lake Placid	Hans Rinn and Norbert Hahn (GDR)	Peter Gschnitzer and Karl Brunner (ITA)	Georg Fluckinger and Karl Schrott (AUT)
1984 Sarajevo	Hans Stangassinger and Franz Wembacher (FRG)	Yevgeny Belousov and Aleksandr Belyakov (URS)	Jörg Hoffmann and Jochen Pietzsch (GDR)
1988 Calgary	Jörg Hoffmann and Jochen Pietzsch (GDR)	Stefan Krauße and Jan Behrendt (GDR)	Thomas Schwab and Wolfgang Staudinger (FRG)
1992 Albertville	Stefan Krauße and Jan Behrendt (GER)	Yves Mankel and Thomas Rudolph (GER)	Hansjörg Raffl and Norbert Huber (ITA)
1994 Lillehammer	Kurt Brugger and Wilfried Huber (ITA)	Hansjörg Raffl and Norbert Huber (ITA)	Stefan Krauße and Jan Behrendt (GER)
1998 Nagano	Stefan Krauße and Jan Behrendt (GER)	Chris Thorpe and Gordon Sheer (USA)	Mark Grimmette and Brian Martin (USA)
2002 Salt Lake City	Patric Leitner and Alexander Resch (GER)	Mark Grimmette and Brian Martin (USA)	Chris Thorpe and Clay Ives (USA)
2006 Turin	Andreas Linger and Wolfgang Linger (AUT)	André Florschütz and Torsten Wustlich (GER)	Gerhard Plankensteiner and Oswald Haselrieder (ITA)
2010 Vancouver	Andreas Linger and Wolfgang Linger (AUT)	Andris Šics and Juris Šics (LAT)	Patric Leitner and Alexander Resch (GER)
2014 Sochi	Tobias Wendl and Tobias Arlt (GER)	Andreas Linger and Wolfgang Linger (AUT)	Andris Šics and Juris Šics (LAT)
2018 Pyeongchang	Tobias Wendl and Tobias Arlt (GER)	Peter Penz and Georg Fischler (AUT)	Sascha Benecken and Toni Eggert (GER)
2022 Beijing	Tobias Wendl and Tobias Arlt (GER)	Sascha Benecken and Toni Eggert (GER)	Thomas Steu and Lorenz Koller (AUT)
2026 Milano Cortina	Emanuel Rieder and Simon Kainzwaldner (ITA)	Thomas Steu and Wolfgang Kindl (AUT)	Tobias Wendl and Tobias Arlt (GER)

Medals
Rank	Nation	Gold	Silver	Bronze	Total
1	Germany	6	3	4	13
2	East Germany	5	1	2	8
3	Austria	3	5	3	11
4	Italy	3	2	3	8
5	West Germany	1	1	2	4
6	United States	0	2	2	4
7	Latvia	0	1	1	2
8	Soviet Union	0	1	0	1
Total	8 nations	17	15	16	48

=== Women’s doubles ===
Games	Gold	Silver	Bronze
2026 Milano Cortina	Andrea Vötter and Marion Oberhofer (ITA)	Dajana Eitberger and Magdalena Matschina (GER)	Selina Egle and Lara Kipp (AUT)

Medals
Rank	Nation	Gold	Silver	Bronze	Total
1	Italy	1	0	0	1
2	Germany	0	1	0	1
3	Austria	0	0	1	1
Total	3 nations	1	1	1	3

=== Team relay ===
Games	Gold	Silver	Bronze
2014 Sochi	Germany; Natalie Geisenberger; Felix Loch; Tobias Wendl; Tobias Arlt	Russia; Tatiana Ivanova; Albert Demchenko; Alexander Denisyev; Vladislav Antonov	Latvia; Elīza Tīruma; Mārtiņš Rubenis; Andris Šics; Juris Šics
2018 Pyeongchang	Germany; Natalie Geisenberger; Johannes Ludwig; Tobias Wendl; Tobias Arlt	Canada; Alex Gough; Samuel Edney; Tristan Walker; Justin Snith	Austria; Madeleine Egle; David Gleirscher; Peter Penz; Georg Fischler
2022 Beijing	Germany; Natalie Geisenberger; Johannes Ludwig; Tobias Wendl; Tobias Arlt	Austria; Madeleine Egle; Wolfgang Kindl; Thomas Steu; Lorenz Koller	Latvia; Elīza Tīruma; Kristers Aparjods; Mārtiņš Bots; Roberts Plūme
2026 Milano Cortina	Germany; Julia Taubitz; Tobias Wendl; Tobias Arlt; Max Langenhan; Dajana Eitberger; Magdalena Matschina	Austria; Lisa Schulte; Thomas Steu; Wolfgang Kindl; Jonas Müller; Selina Egle; Lara Kipp	Italy; Verena Hofer; Emanuel Rieder; Simon Kainzwaldner; Dominik Fischnaller; Andrea Vötter; Marion Oberhofer

Medals
Rank	Nation	Gold	Silver	Bronze	Total
1	Germany	4	0	0	4
2	Austria	0	2	1	3
3	Canada	0	1	0	1
3	Russia	0	1	0	1
5	Latvia	0	0	2	2
6	Italy	0	0	1	1
Total	6 nations	4	4	4	12

== Statistics ==
=== Medal leaders ===
Athletes that have won at least two medals are listed below. Medalists are sorted first by the total number of medals, then successively by the number of gold, silver and bronze medals. If a tie is still verified, medalists are ordered chronologically by their first medal.

==== Men ====
Athlete	NOC	Olympics	Gold	Silver	Bronze	Total
Tobias Arlt	Germany	2014-2022	6	0	0	6
Tobias Wendl	Germany	2014-2022	6	0	0	6
Armin Zöggeler	Italy	1994–2014	2	1	3	6
Georg Hackl	West Germany; Germany	1988–2002	3	2	0	5
Johannes Ludwig	Germany	2018–2022	3	0	1	4
Stefan Krauße	East Germany; Germany	1988–1998	2	1	1	4
Jan Behrendt	East Germany; Germany	1988–1998	2	1	1	4
Klaus Bonsack	United Team of Germany	1964–1972	1	1	2	4
Felix Loch	Germany	2010–2014	3	0	0	3
Thomas Köhler	United Team of Germany	1964–1968	2	1	0	3
Paul Hildgartner	Italy	1972–1984	2	1	0	3
Andreas Linger	Austria	2006–2014	2	1	0	3
Wolfgang Linger	Austria	2006–2014	2	1	0	3
Albert Demchenko	Russia	2006–2014	0	3	0	3
Markus Prock	Austria	1992–2002	0	2	1	3
Andris Šics	Latvia	2010–2014	0	1	2	3
Juris Šics	Latvia	2010–2014	0	1	2	3
Hans Rinn	East Germany	1976–1980	2	0	0	2
Norbert Hahn	East Germany	1976–1980	2	0	0	2
Jörg Hoffmann	East Germany	1984–1988	1	0	1	2
Jochen Pietzsch	East Germany	1984–1988	1	0	1	2
Jens Müller	East Germany; Germany	1988–1998	1	0	1	2
Patric Leitner	Germany	2002–2010	1	0	1	2
Alexander Resch	Germany	2002–2010	1	0	1	2
David Gleirscher	Austria	2018	1	0	1	2
Hansjörg Raffl	Italy	1992–1994	0	1	1	2
Norbert Huber	Italy	1992–1994	0	1	1	2
Chris Thorpe	United States	1998–2002	0	1	1	2
Mark Grimmette	United States	1998–2002	0	1	1	2
Brian Martin	United States	1998–2002	0	1	1	2
Peter Penz	Austria	2018	0	1	1	2
Georg Fischler	Austria	2018	0	1	1	2
Mārtiņš Rubenis	Latvia	2006-2014	0	0	2	2

==== Women ====
Athlete	NOC	Olympics	Gold	Silver	Bronze	Total
Natalie Geisenberger	Germany	2010–2022	6	0	1	7
Silke Kraushaar	Germany	1998–2006	1	1	1	3
Tatjana Hüfner	Germany	2006–2014	1	1	1	3
Steffi Martin	East Germany	1984–1988	2	0	0	2
Sylke Otto	Germany	2002–2006	2	0	0	2
Margit Schumann	East Germany	1972–1976	1	0	1	2
Ute Rührold	East Germany	1972–1976	0	2	0	2
Barbara Niedernhuber	Germany	1998–2002	0	2	0	2
Susi Erdmann	Germany	1992–1994	0	1	1	2
Angelika Neuner	Austria	1992–1998	0	1	1	2
Alex Gough	Canada	2018	0	1	1	2

=== Medals per year ===
×	NOC did not exist	#	Number of medals won by the NOC	–	NOC did not win any medals

NOC	1924–60	64	68	72	76	80	84	88	92	94	98	02	06	10	14	18	22	26	Total
Austria		3	2	–	1	1	–	–	4	2	1	1	1	2	1	3	2	4	28
Canada		–	–	–	–	–	–	–	–	–	–	–	–	–	–	2	–	–	2
United Team of Germany		5	×	×	×	×	×	×	×	×	×	×	×	×	×	×	×	×	5
East Germany		×	3	8	5	3	4	6	×	×	×	×	×	×	×	×	×	×	29
West Germany		×	3	–	3	1	1	2	×	×	×	×	×	×	×	×	×	×	10
Germany		×	×	×	×	×	×	×	4	3	5	5	4	5	5	6	6	5	48
Italy		1	1	1	–	2	1	–	1	4	1	1	2	1	1	–	1	4	22
Latvia		×	×	×	×	×	×	×	–	–	–	–	1	1	2	–	1	1	6
ROC		×	×	×	×	×	×	×	×	×	×	×	×	×	×	×	×	1	1
Russia		×	×	×	×	×	×	×	×	–	–	–	1	–	2	×	×	×	3
Soviet Union		–	–	–	–	2	3	1	×	×	×	×	×	×	×	×	×	×	6
United States		–	–	–	–	–	–	–	–	–	2	2	–	–	1	1	–	1	7

=== Medal sweep events ===
These are events in which athletes from one NOC won all three medals.

Games	Event	NOC	Gold	Silver	Bronze
1964 Innsbruck	Men's Singles	United Team of Germany	Thomas Köhler	Klaus-Michael Bonsack	Hans Plenk
1972 Sapporo	Men's Singles *	East Germany	Wolfgang Scheidel	Harald Ehrig	Wolfram Fiedler
1972 Sapporo	Women's Singles	East Germany	Anna-Maria Müller	Ute Rührold	Margit Schumann
1984 Sarajevo	Women's Singles	East Germany	Steffi Walter-Martin	Bettina Schmidt	Ute Oberhoffner-Weiß
1988 Calgary	Women's Singles	East Germany	Steffi Walter-Martin	Ute Oberhoffner-Weiß	Cerstin Schmidt
2002 Salt Lake City	Women's Singles	Germany	Sylke Otto	Barbara Niedernhuber	Silke Kraushaar
2006 Turin	Women's Singles	Germany	Sylke Otto	Silke Kraushaar	Tatjana Hüfner

- ^{*} In addition to sweeping the podium, the country also had the fourth-place finisher.

== See also ==
- FIL World Luge Championships
- FIL World Luge Natural Track Championships
