= Luge at the Winter Olympics =

- IOC Code: LUG
- Governing body: FIL
- Events: 4 (men: 1; women: 1; mixed: 2)

Winter Olympics
- 1924; 1928; 1932; 1936; 1948; 1952; 1956; 1960; 1964; 1968; 1972; 1976; 1980; 1984; 1988; 1992; 1994; 1998; 2002; 2006; 2010; 2014; 2018; 2022; 2026
- Medalists

Luge is a winter sport featured at the Winter Olympic Games where a competitor or two-person team rides a flat sled while lying supine (face up) and feet first. The sport is usually contested on a specially designed ice track that allows gravity to increase the sled's speed. The winner normally completes the route with the fastest overall time. It was first contested at the 1964 Winter Olympics, with both men's and women's events and a doubles event. Doubles is technically considered an open event since 1994, but only men have competed in it. German lugers (competing under the IOC country codes of EUA, GDR, FRG and GER at different times since 1964) have dominated the competition, winning 87 medals of 153 possible.

== Summary ==
Games	Year	Events	Best Nation
1 → 8			
9	1964	3	United Team of Germany (1)
10	1968	3	East Germany (1)
11	1972	3	East Germany (2)
12	1976	3	East Germany (3)
13	1980	3	East Germany (4)
14	1984	3	East Germany (5)
15	1988	3	East Germany (6)
16	1992	3	Germany (1)

Games	Year	Events	Best Nation
17	1994	3	Italy (1)
18	1998	3	Germany (2)
19	2002	3	Germany (3)
20	2006	3	Germany (4)
21	2010	3	Germany (5)
22	2014	4	Germany (6)
23	2018	4	Germany (7)
24	2022	4	Germany (8)
25	2026	5	Germany (9)

== Events ==
Event	24	28	32	36	48	52	56	60	64	68	72	76	80	84	88	92	94	98	02	06	10	14	18	22	26	Year
Men's singles									•	•	•	•	•	•	•	•	•	•	•	•	•	•	•	•	•	17
Men's doubles									•	•	•	•	•	•	•	•	•	•	•	•	•	•	•	•	•	17
Women's singles									•	•	•	•	•	•	•	•	•	•	•	•	•	•	•	•	•	17
Women's doubles																									•	1
Team relay																						•	•	•	•	4
Total events									3	3	3	3	3	3	3	3	3	3	3	3	3	4	4	4	5	

== Medal leaders ==
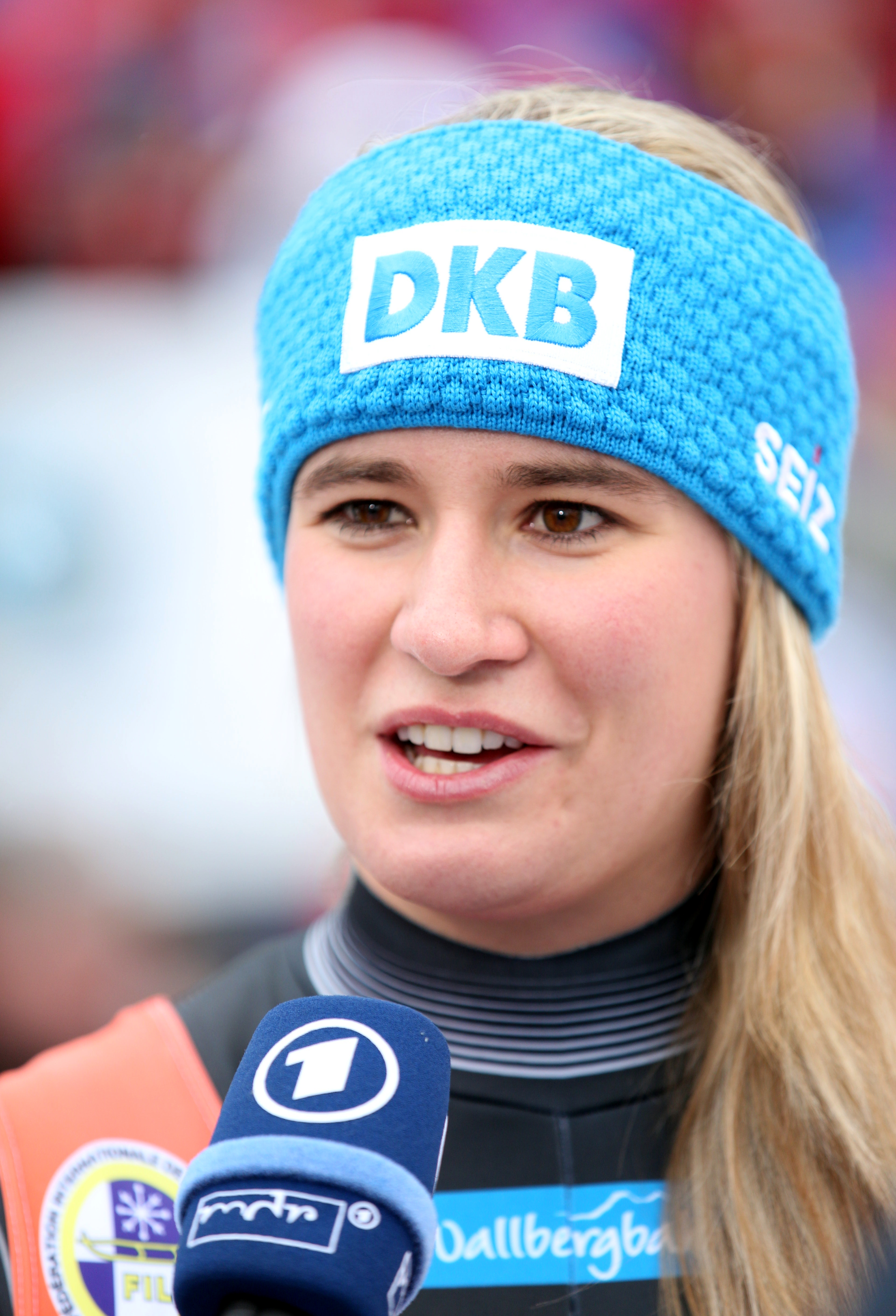
Natalie Geisenberger of Germany is the most successful Olympic luger, having won six gold medals and a bronze attained in four consecutive Olympics (three golds and a bronze in singles, and 3 golds in team relay).

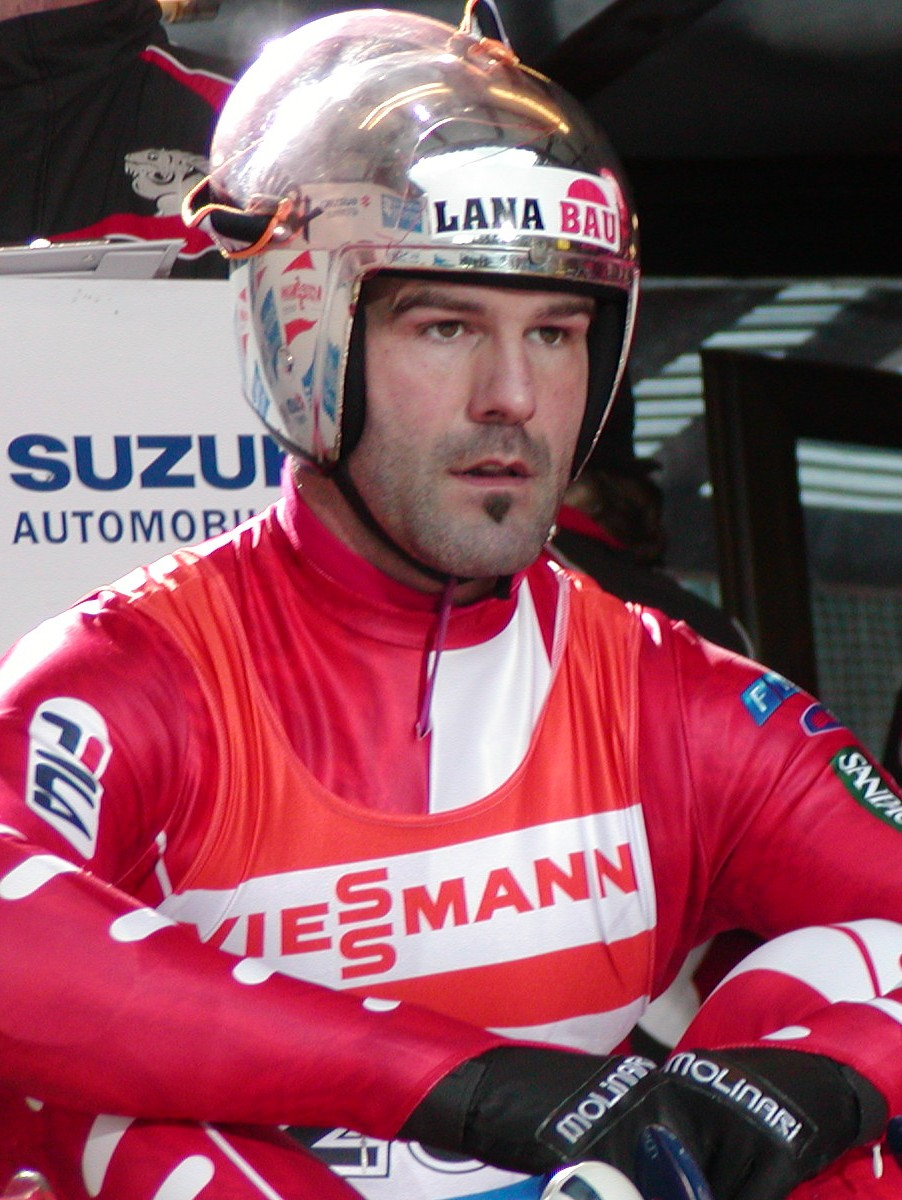
Armin Zöggeler is the only athlete to have won one medal in a single individual event in six Olympics (furthermore consecutive).

Athletes who won at least two gold medals or three medals in total are listed below.

Athlete	NOC	Event	Olympics	Gold	Silver	Bronze	Total
Tobias Arlt	Germany	Doubles; Team relay	2014–2026	7	0	1	8
Tobias Wendl	Germany	Doubles; Team relay	2014–2026	7	0	1	8
Natalie Geisenberger	Germany	Women's singles Team relay	2010–2022	6	0	1	7
Armin Zöggeler	Italy	Men's singles	1994–2014	2	1	3	6
Georg Hackl	West Germany; Germany	Men's singles	1988–2006	3	2	0	5
Jan Behrendt	East Germany; Germany	Doubles	1988–1998	2	1	1	4
Stefan Krauße	East Germany; Germany	Doubles	1988–1998	2	1	1	4
Klaus Bonsack	United Team of Germany; East Germany	Men's singles Doubles	1964–1972	1	1	2	4
Felix Loch	Germany	Men's singles Team relay	2010–2014	3	0	0	3
Thomas Köhler	United Team of Germany; East Germany	Men's singles Doubles	1964–1968	2	1	0	3
Paul Hildgartner	Italy	Men's singles Doubles	1972–1988	2	1	0	3
Andreas Linger	Austria	Doubles	2006–2014	2	1	0	3
Wolfgang Linger	Austria	Doubles	2006–2014	2	1	0	3
Hans Rinn	East Germany	Men's singles Doubles	1976–1980	2	0	1	3
Silke Kraushaar	Germany	Women's singles	1998–2006	1	1	1	3
Tatjana Hüfner	Germany	Women's singles	2006–2014	1	1	1	3
Albert Demchenko	Russia	Men's singles Team relay	1994–2014	0	3	0	3
Markus Prock	Austria	Men's singles	1984–2002	0	2	1	3
Andris Šics	Latvia	Doubles; Team relay	2006–2014	0	1	2	3
Juris Šics	Latvia	Doubles; Team relay	2006–2014	0	1	2	3
Norbert Hahn	East Germany	Doubles	1976–1980	2	0	0	2
Steffi Martin	East Germany	Women's singles	1984–1988	2	0	0	2
Sylke Otto	Germany	Women's singles	1992; 2002–2006	2	0	0	2

== Medal table ==
Sources (after the 2022 Winter Olympics):
Accurate as of 2026 Winter Olympics.

Rank	Nation	Gold	Silver	Bronze	Total
1	Germany	25	13	10	48
2	East Germany	13	8	8	29
3	Italy	9	4	9	22
4	Austria	6	13	10	29
5	United Team of Germany	2	2	1	5
6	West Germany	1	4	5	10
7	Soviet Union	1	2	3	6
8	United States	0	3	4	7
9	Russia	0	3	0	3
10	Latvia	0	2	4	6
11	Canada	0	1	1	2
12	ROC	0	0	1	1
Totals (12 entries)		57	55	56	168

Note: two gold medals handed in the 1972 doubles competition.

== Number of lugers by nation ==
Nation	24	28	32	36	48	52	56	60	64	68	72	76	80	84	88	92	94	98	02	06	10	14	18	22	26	Years
Argentina									1						1	1			2	1	1		1	1	1	9
Australia																1	1			1	1	1	1	1	1	9
Austria									9	9	8	7	10	7	7	7	8	8	10	10	9	10	10	10	12	17
Bermuda																1	1	1	1							4
Bosnia and Herzegovina																	2	1						1		3
Brazil																			2							1
Bulgaria															3	3	2			1	2	1	1	1		8
Canada									1	7	4	8	4	2	9	6	2	2	7	10	10	8	8	6	6	17
China																								4	6	2
Chinese Taipei												2		3	2			2	2	1	1	1	1	1		10
Croatia																							1			1
Czech Republic																			2	4	4	4	6	4	1	7
Czechoslovakia									6	6		4	3	3	2	4										7
East Germany										8	9	9	9	10	10											6
Estonia																	1	2								2
France										5	1	1			1	3			3		1	1				8
Georgia																	2				2		1	1		4
Germany																10	10	10	10	10	10	10	10	10	12	10
Great Britain									2	2	6	4	7	4	4	2	1		1	2	1		2	1		14
Greece																	2	1								2
India																		1	1	1	1		1			5
Independent Olympic Athletes																						1				1
Ireland																								1		1
Italy									7	9	9	8	9	9	9	8	8	10	10	9	8	10	9	8	12	17
Japan											7	5	2	4	5	3	3	6	4	5	3	1		1	1	14
Kazakhstan																						1	1			2
Latvia																6	8	10	8	8	10	9	10	10	9	10
Liechtenstein									3	3	1	3	2	1	1		1									8
Moldova																			1	1	1	1		1		5
Netherlands Antilles															1											1
New Zealand																		1	1							2
Norway									4	2	3	7		2		2	3					3				8
Olympic Athletes from Russia																							8			1
Philippines															1											1
Poland									8	9	8	8				2	2	2		3	2	5	6	4	6	13
Puerto Rico														1	2											2
ROC																								10		1
Romania													4	3	1	3	4	3	4	4	8	2	5	4	7	13
Russia																	8	7	10	10	10	10				6
Slovakia																	2	1	4	6	5	6	5	5	5	9
Slovenia																				1	1		1			3
South Korea																		3	3	1	1	4	5	5	1	8
Soviet Union											7	6	7	10	10											5
Spain										4					1	1										3
Sweden										5		5	4	2	2	3	5	3	2					2	2	11
Switzerland									9				2				1	1	2	2	2	2	1	1	1	11
Tonga																						1				1
Ukraine																	3	6	4	6	6	6	6	6	9	9
Unified Team																10										1
United Team of Germany									9																	1
United States									9	8	10	9	10	9	10	9	10	10	10	10	10	10	10	8	11	17
Venezuela																		1	4	1						3
Virgin Islands															1	2	2	1	2							5
West Germany										8	10	8	7	8	7											6
Yugoslavia														3		2										2
Nations	-	-	-	-	-	-	-	-	12	14	13	16	14	17	22	22	25	24	26	24	24	24	24	26	19	
Lugers	-	-	-	-	-	-	-	-	68	85	83	94	80	81	90	89	92	93	110	108	110	108	110	106	106	
Year	24	28	32	36	48	52	56	60	64	68	72	76	80	84	88	92	94	98	02	06	10	14	18	22	26	

== See also ==
- List of Olympic medalists in luge
- List of Olympic venues in luge
- List of multiple Olympic medalists in one event
- Luge at the Youth Olympic Games
