= Wilfried Huber =

Italian luger (born 1970)

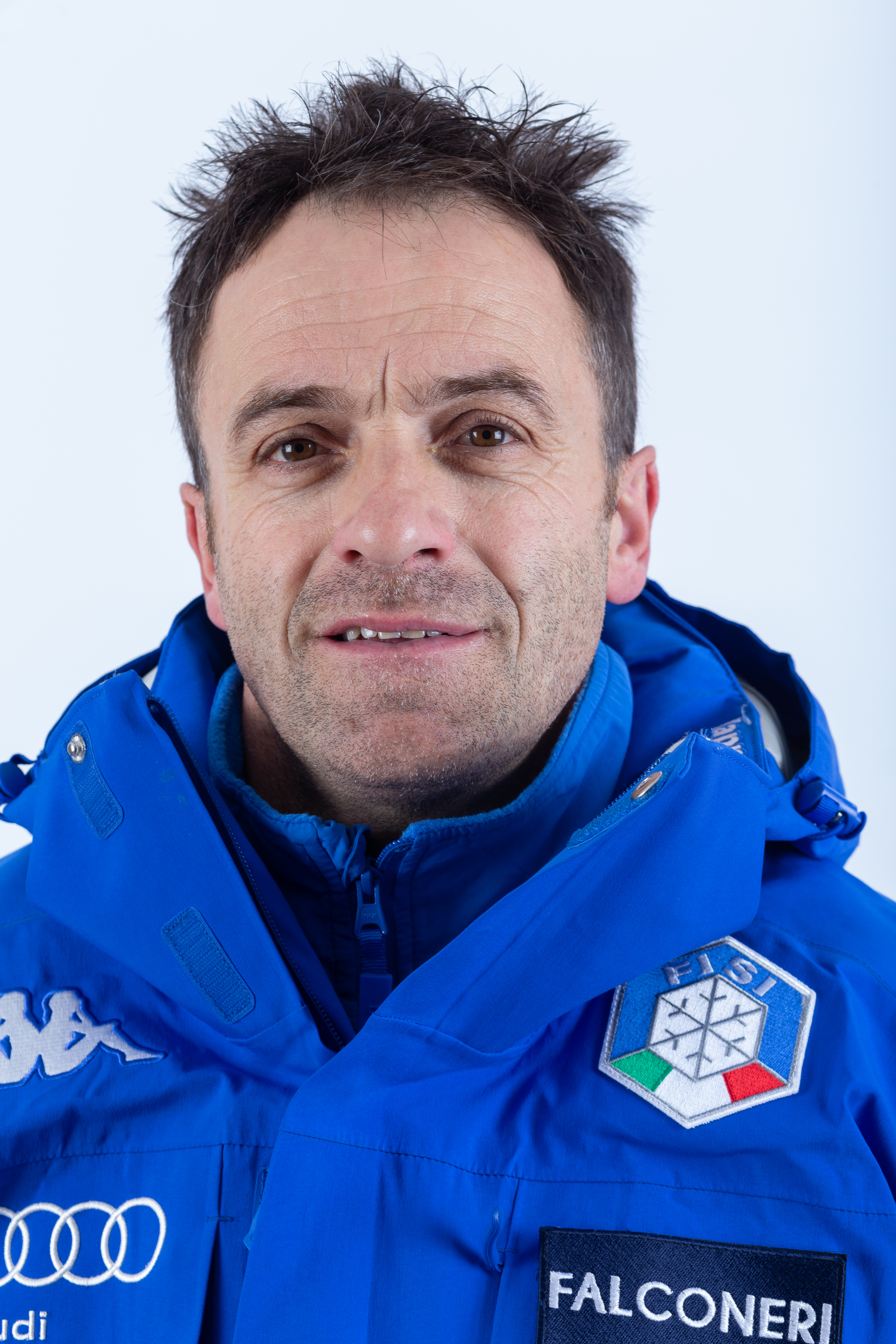
- Huber in 2018

Medal record

Men's luge

Representing Italy

Olympic Games
| Gold medal – first place | 1994 Lillehammer | Men's doubles |

World Championships
| Silver medal – second place | 1990 Calgary | Men's doubles |
| Silver medal – second place | 1995 Lillehammer | Mixed team |
| Bronze medal – third place | 1993 Calgary | Men's singles |
| Bronze medal – third place | 1993 Calgary | Men's doubles |
| Bronze medal – third place | 1995 Lillehammer | Men's doubles |
| Bronze medal – third place | 1996 Altenberg | Mixed team |
| Bronze medal – third place | 1997 Igls | Mixed team |

European Championships
| Gold medal – first place | 1994 Königssee | Mixed team |
| Silver medal – second place | 1992 Winterberg | Men's doubles |
| Silver medal – second place | 1994 Königssee | Men's doubles |
| Silver medal – second place | 1998 Oberhof | Mixed team |
| Bronze medal – third place | 1996 Sigulda | Mixed team |

Wilfried Huber (born 15 November 1970 in Bruneck, South Tyrol) is an Italian luger and coach who competed from 1985 to 2010. Together with Kurt Brugger, he won the men's doubles event at the 1994 Winter Olympics in Lillehammer. He competed in both doubles and singles, but enjoyed his greatest success in doubles in partnership with Brugger. He made his debut in the Luge World Cup in the 1986-87 season. He also took two medals at the World Junior Championships in Olang in 1988, a silver and a bronze. He competed in six Winter Olympics, in 1988, 1992, 1994, 1998, 2002 and 2006: he was aiming to compete at the 2010 Winter Olympics, however he was not selected by the Italian team's head coach Walter Plaikner, and retired at the end of the season.

Huber also won seven medals at the FIL World Luge Championships, including two silvers (Men's doubles: 1990, Mixed team: 1995) and five bronzes (Men's singles: 1993, Men's doubles: 1993, 1995; Mixed team: 1996, 1997). At the European Luge Championships, he won five medals with one gold (Mixed team: 1994), three silvers (Men's doubles: 1992, 1994; Mixed team: 1998) and one bronze (Mixed team: 1996).

In the Luge World Cup, Huber finished second overall four times in the men's doubles championship (1989–90, 1992-3, 1994-5, 1997-8) and third overall once in the men's singles championship (1996-7).

After retiring from competition, he joined the coaching staff of the Italian national luge team.

He also had siblings who were involved in bobsleigh and luge. Günther won gold in the two-man bobsleigh event (shared with Canada) at the 1998 Winter Olympics in Nagano. Norbert won two Winter Olympic medals in men's doubles luge in the 1990s: in 1994 he took the silver behind his brother. Arnold won the men's singles world championships at Winterberg in 1991.
