= Susi Erdmann =

German bobsledder and luger

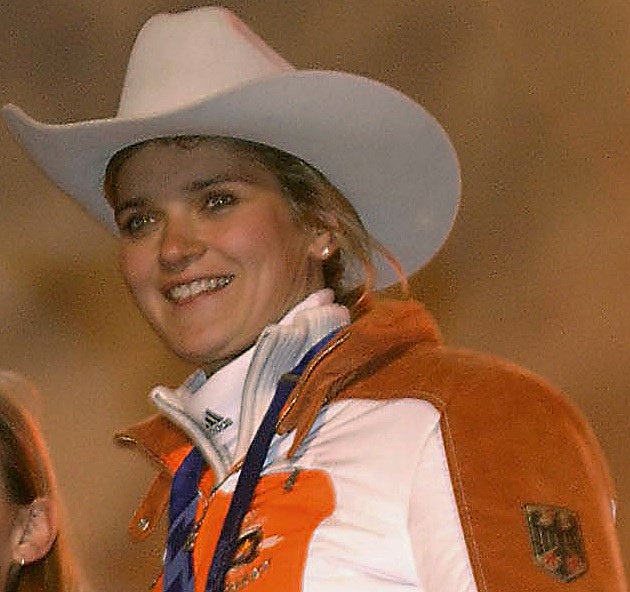
- Erdmann at the 2002 Winter Olympics

Personal information
- Born: Susi-Lisa Erdmann; 29 January 1968 (age 58) Blankenburg, Bezirk Magdeburg, East Germany

Sport
- Country: East Germany; Germany
- Sport: Luge; Bobsleigh
- Events: Women's singles Mixed team Two-woman

Achievements and titles
- Olympic finals: 2nd place, silver medalist(s) 3rd place, bronze medalist(s)
Medal record
Women's luge
Representing East Germany
Representing Germany
Olympic Games
Silver medal – second place	1994 Lillehammer	Women's singles
Bronze medal – third place	1992 Albertville	Women's singles
World Championships
Gold medal – first place	1989 Winterberg	Women's singles
Gold medal – first place	1990 Calgary	Mixed team
Gold medal – first place	1991 Winterberg	Women's singles
Gold medal – first place	1991 Winterberg	Mixed team
Gold medal – first place	1993 Calgary	Mixed team
Gold medal – first place	1995 Lillehammer	Mixed team
Gold medal – first place	1997 Igls	Women's singles
Silver medal – second place	1989 Winterberg	Mixed team
Silver medal – second place	1995 Lillehammer	Women's singles
Silver medal – second place	1996 Altenberg	Women's singles
World Cup Championships
Gold medal – first place	1990–91	Women's singles
Gold medal – first place	1991–92	Women's singles
Bronze medal – third place	1987–88	Women's singles
Bronze medal – third place	1993–94	Women's singles
European Championships
Gold medal – first place	1990 Igls	Women's singles
Gold medal – first place	1990 Igls	Mixed team
Gold medal – first place	1992 Winterberg	Women's singles
Gold medal – first place	1992 Winterberg	Mixed team
Gold medal – first place	1996 Sigulda	Mixed team
Gold medal – first place	1998 Oberhof	Mixed team
Bronze medal – third place	1998 Oberhof	Women's singles
Women's bobsleigh
Representing Germany
Olympic Games
Bronze medal – third place	2002 Salt Lake City	Two-woman
World Championships
Gold medal – first place	2003 Winterberg	Two-woman
Gold medal – first place	2004 Königssee	Two-woman
Bronze medal – third place	2001 Calgary	Two-woman
World Cup Championships
Gold medal – first place	2001–02	Two-woman
Gold medal – first place	2002–03	Two-woman
Bronze medal – third place	2003–04	Two-woman
Bronze medal – third place	2004–05	Two-woman
European Championships
Bronze medal – third place	2006 St. Moritz	Two-woman

Susi-Lisa Erdmann (later Plankensteiner; born 29 January 1968) is an East German-German luger and bobsledder who competed from 1977 to 1998 in luge, then since 1999 in bobsleigh. She was born in Blankenburg, Bezirk Magdeburg. Competing in five Winter Olympics, she won two medals in the women's singles luge event with a silver in 1994 and a bronze in 1992, and a bronze at the inaugural two-women bobsleigh event in 2002. She is one of only two people to ever win a medal in both bobsleigh and luge at the Winter Olympics; Italy's Gerda Weissensteiner is the other.

== Luge career ==
Beside the Olympics in luge, Erdmann won ten medals at the FIL World Luge Championships, including seven golds (Women's singles: 1989, 1991, 1997; Mixed team: 1990, 1991, 1993, 1995) and three silvers (Women's singles: 1995, 1996; Mixed team: 1989). She also won seven medals at the FIL European Luge Championships, including six golds (Women's singles: 1990, 1992; Mixed team: 1990, 1992, 1996, 1998) and one bronze (Women's singles: 1998). Erdmann won the overall Luge World Cup title in women's singles twice (1990–91, 1991–92).

== Bobsleigh career ==
Erdmann switched to bobsleigh in 1998, competing both at the Winter Olympics and the FIBT World Championships. She won three medals in the two-woman event at the World Championships, with two gold (2003, 2004) and one bronze (2001). Erdmann also won the overall two-woman Bobsleigh World Cup championships for the 2001-2 and 2002-3 seasons. Her coach was Wolfgang Hoppe, who won several medals in bobsleigh during the 1980s and 1990s when he competed for both the East Germans and the Germans following 1990 reunification.

== Other activities ==
Erdmann is a soldier in the rank of a Hauptfeldwebel and has been stationed in Munich. It was announced on 7 September 2009 FIL website that Erdmann had married Italian luger Gerhard Plankensteiner on 28 August 2009. Plankensteiner won a bronze in the men's doubles event at the 2006 Winter Olympics in Turin and gold in the same event at the 2009 world championships in Lake Placid.

== Bobsleigh career highlights ==
Olympic Winter Games
2002 – Salt Lake City, (bronze) 3rd with Nicole Herschmann
World Championships
2001 – Calgary, (bronze) 3rd with Tanja Hess
2003 – Winterberg, (gold) 1st with Anne Dietrich
2004 – Königssee, (gold) 1st with Kristina Bader
European Championships
2006 – St.Moritz, (bronze) 3rd with Anne Dietrich
World Cup Single Events
2001/2002 – Winterberg, (silver) 2nd with Birgit Brodbeck
2001/2002 – Winterberg, (silver) 2nd with Birgit Brodbeck
2001/2002 – Königssee, (silver) 2nd with Tanja Hess
2001/2002 – Königssee, (gold) 1st with Birgit Brodbeck
2001/2002 – Igls, (silver) 2nd with Tanja Hess
2001/2002 – Igls, (silver) 2nd with Birgit Brodbeck
2001/2002 – Calgary, (gold) 1st with Tanja Hess
2001/2002 – Calgary, (gold) 1st with Nicole Herschmann
2002/2003 – Calgary, (bronze) 3rd with Tanja Hess
2002/2003 – Park City, (silver) 2nd with Anne Dietrich
2002/2003 – Park City, (silver) 2nd with Anne Dietrich
2002/2003 – Lake Placid, (silver) 2nd with Anne Dietrich
2002/2003 – Lake Placid, (silver) 2nd with Tanja Hess
2002/2003 – Igls, (gold) 1st with Anne Dietrich
2002/2003 – Igls, (gold) 1st with Anne Dietrich
2003/2004 – Calgary, (silver) 2nd with Kristina Bader
2003/2004 – Calgary, (silver) 2nd with Nicole Herschmann
2003/2004 – Lake Placid, (silver) 2nd with Nicole Herschmann
2003/2004 – Lake Placid, (gold) 1st with Kristina Bader
2003/2004 – Lillehammer, (silver) 2nd with Anne Dietrich
2004/2005 – Winterberg, (silver) 2nd with Anne Dietrich
2004/2005 – Cortina d'Ampezzo, (silver) 2nd with Anja Schneiderheinze
2004/2005 – Cesana, (bronze) 3rd with Anne Dietrich
2004/2005 – St. Moritz, (bronze) 3rd with Anne Dietrich
2004/2005 – Lake Placid, (silver) 2nd with Berit Wiacker
2005/2006 – Cortina d'Ampezzo, (silver) 2nd with Anne Dietrich
2005/2006 – Königssee, (gold) 1st with Anne Dietrich
