= Gabriele Kohlisch =

German luger

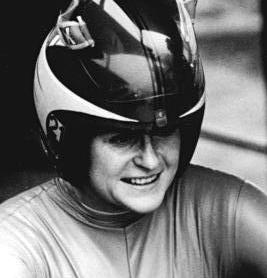
- Kohlisch in 1989

Personal information
- Born: 7 December 1963 (age 62)
Medal record
Women's Luge
Representing East Germany
Representing Germany
World Championships
Gold medal – first place	1990 Calgary	Women's singles
Gold medal – first place	1990 Calgary	Mixed team
Gold medal – first place	1991 Winterberg	Mixed team
Gold medal – first place	1993 Calgary	Mixed team
Gold medal – first place	1995 Lillehammer	Women's singles
Gold medal – first place	1995 Lillehammer	Mixed team
Silver medal – second place	1987 Igls	Women's singles
Silver medal – second place	1991 Winterberg	Women's singles
Silver medal – second place	1993 Calgary	Women's singles
Silver medal – second place	1996 Altenberg	Mixed team
World Cup Championships
Gold medal – first place	1993-94	Women's singles
Silver medal – second place	1987-88	Women's singles
Silver medal – second place	1994-95	Women's singles
Bronze medal – third place	1986-87	Women's singles
Bronze medal – third place	1990-91	Women's singles
Bronze medal – third place	1995-96	Women's singles
European Championships
Silver medal – second place	1994 Königssee	Mixed team
Silver medal – second place	1996 Sigulda	Women's singles
Bronze medal – third place	1994 Königssee	Women's singles
Women's Bobsleigh
Representing Germany
World Championships
Gold medal – first place	2000 Winterberg	Two-woman

Gabriele Kohlisch (born 7 December 1963) is a German luger and bobsledder who competed from the mid-1980s to 1997 in luge, then from 1998 to the early 2000s in bobsleigh. She is one of only two people to win World Championship gold medals in both bobsledding and luge, the other being fellow German Susi Erdmann.

She was born in Karl-Marx-Stadt (modern Chemnitz) and initially competed for East Germany.

== Luge career ==
Kohlisch won ten medals at the FIL World Luge Championships, including six golds (Women's singles: 1990, 1995; Mixed team: 1990, 1991, 1993, 1995) and four silvers (Women's singles: 1987, 1991, 1993; Mixed team: 1996). She also won three medals at the FIL European Luge Championships, including two silvers (Women's singles: 1996; Mixed team: 1994) and one bronze (Women's singles: 1994). Kohlisch competed in two Winter Olympics for the reunified Germany in the women's singles event, finishing sixth in both 1992 and 1994. Kohilsch retired from luge in 1997, mainly to the competitiveness among her fellow German teammates, most notably Jana Bode, Erdmann, Silke Kraushaar, Barbara Niedernhuber, and Sylke Otto. She won the Luge World Cup overall title in women's singles in 1993–4.

== Bobsleigh career ==
Kohlisch switched to bobsleigh in 1998, competing at the FIBT World Championships. She won the gold medal in the debut two-woman event at the 2000 FIBT World Championships in Winterberg, Germany. She tried out for the German bobsleigh team to compete at the 2002 Winter Olympics in Salt Lake City, but finished third behind Erdmann and Sandra Prokoff (Sandra Kiriasis since late 2004).

== Other activities ==
Kohlisch now serves as a spokesperson for the International Luge Federation and has served as a spokesperson for the German luge team since the 1998 Winter Olympics in Nagano.

She is also responsible for physical education at Naval Academy Mürwik (Marineschule Mürwik), the German Naval Academy in Flensburg-Mürwik, Germany.
