= FIL European Luge Championships 1994 =

The FIL European Luge Championships 1994 took place in Königssee, Germany for a record sixth time after hosting the event previously in 1967, 1972, 1973, 1977, and 1988.

== Men's singles ==
Medal	Athlete	Time
Gold	Markus Prock (AUT)	
Silver	Georg Hackl (GER)	
Bronze	Armin Zöggeler (ITA)	

== Women's singles ==
Medal	Athlete	Time
Gold	Gerda Weissensteiner (ITA)	
Silver	Jana Bode (GER)	
Bronze	Gabriele Kohlisch (GER)	

== Men's doubles ==
Medal	Athlete	Time
Gold	Italy (Hansjörg Raffl, Norbert Huber)	
Silver	Italy (Kurt Brugger, Wilfried Huber)	
Bronze	Germany (Yves Mankel, Thomas Rudolph)	

== Mixed team ==
Medal	Athlete	Time
Gold	Italy (Armin Zöggeler, Norbert Huber, Gerda Weissensteiner, Natalie Obkircher, Kurt Brugger, Wilfried Huber)	
Silver	Germany (Georg Hackl, René Friedl, Jana Bode, Gabriele Kohlisch, Yves Mankel, Thomas Rudolph)	
Bronze	Austria (Markus Prock, Markus Schmidt, Doris Neuner, Andrea Tagwerker, Tobias Schiegl, Markus Schiegl)	

== Medal table ==
Rank	Nation	Gold	Silver	Bronze	Total
1	Italy (ITA)	3	1	1	5
2	Austria (AUT)	1	0	1	2
3	Germany (GER)	0	3	2	5
Totals (3 entries)		4	4	4	12
