= FIL European Luge Championships 1990 =

The FIL European Luge Championships 1990 took place in Igls, Austria for a second time after hosting the event previously in 1951.

== Men's singles ==
Medal	Athlete	Time
Gold	Georg Hackl (FRG)	
Silver	Markus Prock (AUT)	
Bronze	Jens Müller (GDR)	

== Women's singles ==
Medal	Athlete	Time
Gold	Susi Erdmann (GDR)	
Silver	Gerda Weissensteiner (ITA)	
Bronze	Jana Bode (FRG)	

== Men's doubles ==
Medal	Athlete	Time
Gold	East Germany (Jörg Hoffmann, Jochen Pietzsch)	
Silver	Italy (Hansjörg Raffl, Norbert Huber)	
Bronze	East Germany (Stefan Krauße, Jan Behrendt)	

== Mixed team ==
Medal	Athlete	Time
Gold	East Germany (Jens Müller, René Friedl, Susi Erdmann, Sylke Otto, Jörg Hoffmann, Jochen Pietzsch)	
Silver	West Germany (Georg Hackl, Johannes Schettel, Jana Bode, Margit Paar, Stefan Ilsanker)	
Bronze	Italy (Arnold Huber, Norbert Huber, Gerda Weissensteiner, Natalie Obkircher, Hansjörg Raffl)	

== Medal table ==
Rank	Nation	Gold	Silver	Bronze	Total
1	East Germany (GDR)	3	0	2	5
2	West Germany (FRG)	1	1	1	3
3	Italy (ITA)	0	2	1	3
4	Austria (AUT)	0	1	0	1
Totals (4 entries)		4	4	4	12
