= FIL European Luge Championships 1998 =

The FIL European Luge Championships 1998 took place in Oberhof, Germany for the second time having hosted the event previously in 1979.

== Men's singles ==
Medal	Athlete	Time
Gold	Markus Prock (AUT)	
Silver	Karsten Albert (GER)	
Bronze	Norbert Huber (ITA)	

== Women's singles ==
Medal	Athlete	Time
Gold	Silke Kraushaar (GER)	
Silver	Andrea Tagwerker (AUT)	
Bronze	Susi Erdmann (GER)	

== Men's doubles ==
Medal	Athlete	Time
Gold	Germany (Stefan Krauße, Jan Behrendt)	
Silver	Germany (Steffen Skel, Steffen Wöller)	
Bronze	Austria (Tobias Schiegl, Markus Schiegl)	

== Mixed team ==
Medal	Athlete	Time
Gold	Germany (Jens Müller, Karsten Albert, Susi Erdmann, Silke Kraushaar, Stefan Krauße, Jan Behrendt)	
Silver	Italy (Armin Zöggeler, Norbert Huber, Natalie Obkircher, Gerda Weissensteiner, Kurt Brugger, Wilfried Huber)	
Bronze	Austria (Markus Prock, Markus Kleinheinz, Angelika Neuner, Andrea Tagwerker, Tobias Schiegl, Markus Schiegl)	

== Medal table ==
Rank	Nation	Gold	Silver	Bronze	Total
1	Germany (GER)	3	2	1	6
2	Austria (AUT)	1	1	2	4
3	Italy (ITA)	0	1	1	2
Totals (3 entries)		4	4	4	12
