= FIL World Luge Championships 1993 =

The FIL World Luge Championships 1993 took place in Calgary, Alberta, Canada for the second time, having previously hosted the event in 1990.

== Men's singles ==
Medal	Athlete	Time
Gold	Wendell Suckow (USA)	
Silver	Georg Hackl (GER)	
Bronze	Wilfried Huber (ITA)	

Suckow is the first American to win a championship at the World or Winter Olympic level.

== Women's singles ==
Medal	Athlete	Time
Gold	Gerda Weissensteiner (ITA)	
Silver	Gabriele Kohlisch (GER)	
Bronze	Doris Neuner (AUT)	

Weissensteiner was the last non-German to win in the event at the World championships until American Erin Hamlin won her gold in 2009.

== Men's doubles ==
Medal	Athlete	Time
Gold	Germany (Stefan Krauße, Jan Behrendt)	
Silver	Italy (Hansjorg Raffl, Norbert Huber)	
Bronze	Italy (Kurt Brugger, Wilfried Huber)	

== Mixed team ==
Medal	Athlete	Time
Gold	Germany (Georg Hackl, René Friedl, Gabriele Kohlisch, Susi Erdmann, Stefan Krauße, Jan Behrendt)	
Silver	Austria (Robert Manzenreiter, Markus Prock, Angelika Neuner, Doris Neuner, Tobias Schiegl, Markus Schiegl)	
Bronze	Italy (Arnold Huber, Gerhard Plankensteiner, Natalie Obkircher, Gerda Weissensteiner, Hansjorg Raffl, Norbert Huber)|	

== Medal table ==
Rank	Nation	Gold	Silver	Bronze	Total
1	Germany (GER)	2	2	0	4
2	Italy (ITA)	1	1	3	5
3	United States (USA)	1	0	0	1
4	Austria (AUT)	0	1	1	2
Totals (4 entries)		4	4	4	12
