= Margit Paar =

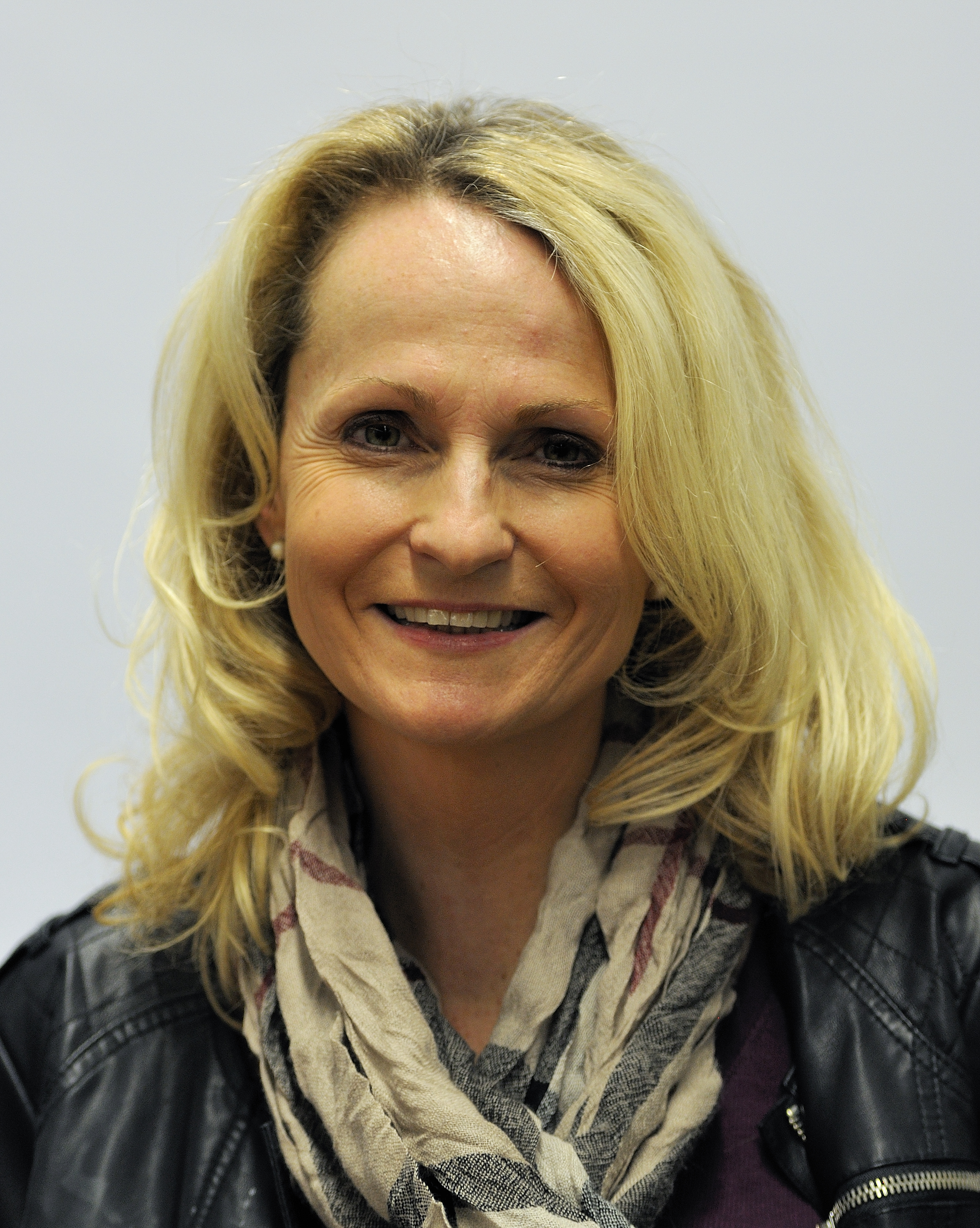

Medal record

Luge

European Championships
| Silver medal – second place | 1990 Igls | Mixed team |

Margit Paar is a West German-German luger who competed in the late 1980s and early 1990s. She won the silver medal in the mixed team event at the 1990 FIL European Luge Championships in Igls, Austria.

During the 2006 Winter Olympics in Turin, Paar served as German press attaché for bobsleigh, luge, and skeleton.
