= René Friedl =

German luger (born 1967)

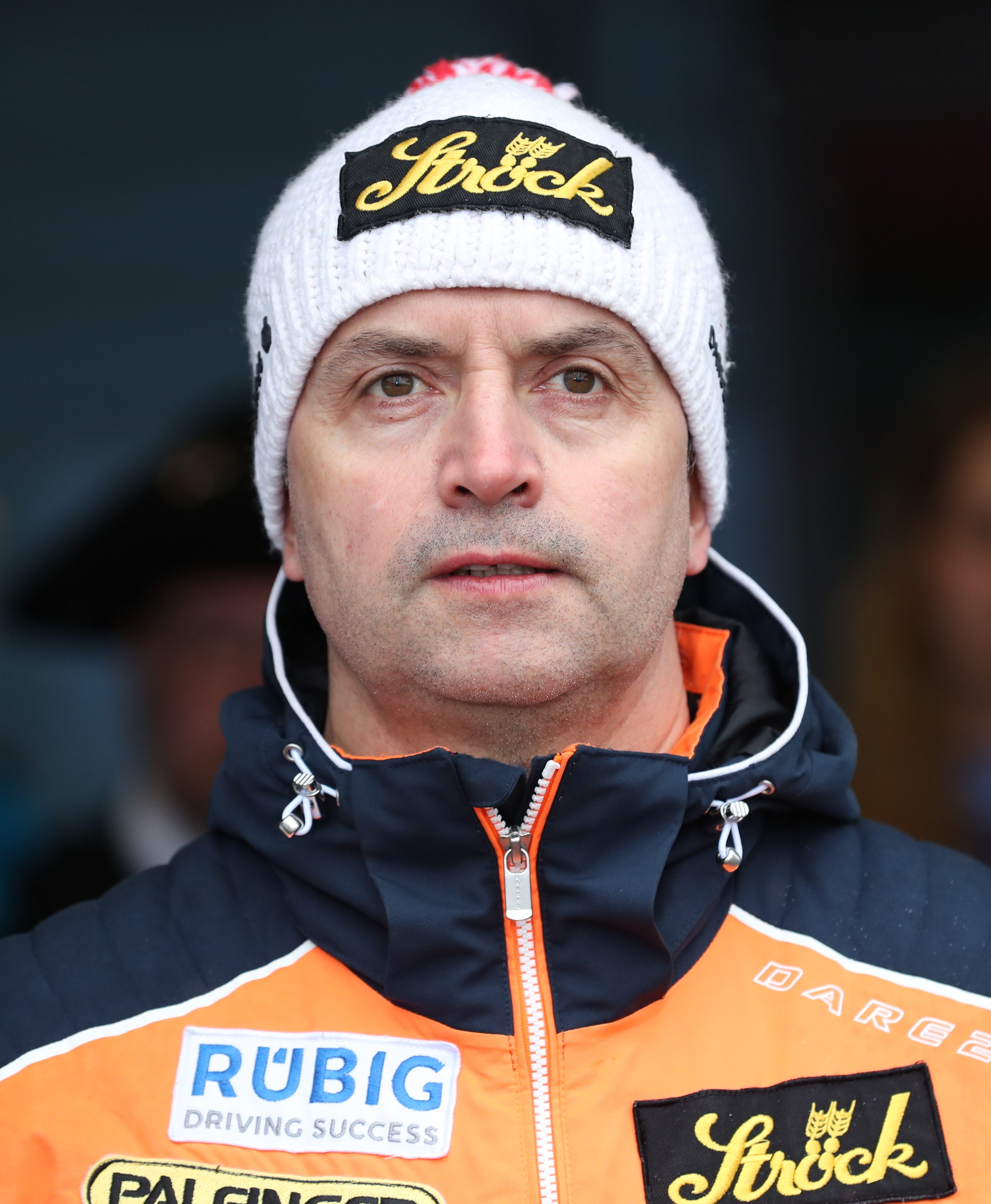
- Friedl in 2020

Medal record

Luge

World Championships
Gold medal – first place	1993 Calgary	Mixed team
Silver medal – second place	1989 Winterberg	Mixed team

European Championships
Gold medal – first place	1990 Igls	Mixed team
Gold medal – first place	1992 Winterberg	Men's singles
Gold medal – first place	1992 Winterberg	Mixed team
Silver medal – second place	1994 Königssee	Mixed team

René Friedl (born 17 July 1967 in Friedrichroda) is an East German-German luger who has competed during the late 1980s and early 1990s. He won two medals in the mixed team event at the FIL World Luge Championships with a gold in 1993 and a silver in 1989.

Friedl also won four medals at the FIL European Luge Championships with three golds (Men's singles: 1992, Mixed team (1990, 1992) and one silver (Mixed team: 1994). His best overall Luge World Cup seasonal finish was second in the men's singles in 1986-7.

Friedl also finished eighth in the men's singles event at the 1992 Winter Olympics in Albertville.

Since 2005, he has been head coach of the Austrian luge team.
