= Natalie Obkircher =

Italian luger

Medal record

Luge

Representing Italy

World Championships
Silver medal – second place	1995 Lillehammer	Mixed team
Bronze medal – third place	1991 Winterberg	Mixed team
Bronze medal – third place	1993 Calgary	Mixed team
Bronze medal – third place	1996 Altenberg	Mixed team
Bronze medal – third place	1997 Igls	Mixed team

European Championships
Gold medal – first place	1994 Königssee	Mixed team
Silver medal – second place	1998 Oberhof	Mixed team
Bronze medal – third place	1990 Igls	Mixed team
Bronze medal – third place	1992 Winterberg	Mixed team
Bronze medal – third place	1996 Sigulda	Mixed team
Bronze medal – third place	2000 Winterberg	Mixed team

Natalie Obkircher (born 7 February 1971 in Geldern) is an Italian luger who competed between 1990 and 2003. She won five medals in the mixed team event at the FIL World Luge Championships with one silver (1995) and four bronzes (1991, 1993, 1996, 1997).

At the FIL European Luge Championships, Obkircher won six medals in the mixed team event with a gold in 1994, a silver in 1998 and a bronze in 1990, 1992, 1996 and 2000.

Competing in four Winter Olympics, Obkircher earned her best finish of fifth in the women's singles event at Lillehammer in 1994.
