= FIL World Luge Championships 1996 =

The FIL World Luge Championships 1996 took place in Altenberg, Germany.

== Men's singles ==
Medal	Athlete	Time
Gold	Markus Prock (AUT)	
Silver	Georg Hackl (GER)	
Bronze	Jens Müller (GER)	

== Women's singles ==
Medal	Athlete	Time
Gold	Jana Bode (GER)	
Silver	Susi Erdmann (GER)	
Bronze	Gerda Weissensteiner (ITA)	

== Men's doubles ==
Medal	Athlete	Time
Gold	Austria (Tobias Schiegl, Markus Schiegl)	
Silver	United States (Chris Thorpe, Gordy Sheer)	
Bronze	Italy (Gerhard Plankensteiner, Oswald Haselrieder)	

== Mixed team ==
Medal	Athlete	Time
Gold	Austria (Markus Prock, Markus Schmidt, Angelika Neuner, Andrea Tagwerker, Tobias Schiegl, Markus Schiegl)	
Silver	Germany (Georg Hackl, Jens Müller, Jana Bode, Gabriele Kohlisch, Stefan Krauße, Jan Behrendt)	
Bronze	Italy (Wilfried Huber, Armin Zöggeler, Natalie Obkircher, Gerda Weissensteiner, Gerhard Plankensteiner, Oswald Haselrieder)	

== Medal table ==
Rank	Nation	Gold	Silver	Bronze	Total
1	Austria (AUT)	3	0	0	3
2	Germany (GER)	1	3	1	5
3	United States (USA)	0	1	0	1
4	Italy (ITA)	0	0	3	3
Totals (4 entries)		4	4	4	12
