= FIL World Luge Championships 1997 =

The FIL World Luge Championships 1997 took place in Igls, Austria for the third time after previously hosting the event in 1977 and 1987.

== Men's singles ==
| Medal | Athlete | Time |
|---|---|---|
| Gold | Georg Hackl (GER) | |
| Silver | Markus Prock (AUT) | |
| Bronze | Gerhard Gleirscher (AUT) | |

== Women's singles ==
| Medal | Athlete | Time |
|---|---|---|
| Gold | Susi Erdmann (GER) | |
| Silver | Jana Bode (GER) | |
| Bronze | Angelika Neuner (AUT) | |

== Men's doubles ==
| Medal | Athlete | Time |
|---|---|---|
| Gold | Austria (Tobias Schiegl, Markus Schiegl) | |
| Silver | Germany (Stefan Krauße, Jan Behrendt) | |
| Bronze | Germany (Steffen Skel, Steffen Wöller) | |

== Mixed team ==
| Medal | Athlete | Time |
|---|---|---|
| Gold | Austria (Markus Prock, Gerhard Gleirscher, Andrea Tagwerker, Angelika Neuner, Tobias Schiegl, Markus Schiegl) | |
| Silver | Germany (Georg Hackl, Jens Müller, Silke Kraushaar, Sylke Otto, Stefan Krauße, Jan Behrendt) | |
| Bronze | Italy (Wilfried Huber, Armin Zöggeler, Natalie Obkircher, Gerda Weissensteiner, Gerhard Plankensteiner, Oswald Haselrieder) | |

== Medal table ==
| Rank | Nation | Gold | Silver | Bronze | Total |
|---|---|---|---|---|---|
| 1 | Germany (GER) | 2 | 3 | 1 | 6 |
| 2 | Austria (AUT) | 2 | 1 | 2 | 5 |
| 3 | Italy (ITA) | 0 | 0 | 1 | 1 |
| Totals (3 entries) | | 4 | 4 | 4 | 12 |
