= FIL European Luge Championships 1996 =

The FIL European Luge Championships 1996 took place in Sigulda, Latvia.

== Men's singles ==
Medal	Athlete	Time
Gold	Jens Müller (GER)	
Silver	Albert Demtschenko (RUS)	
Bronze	Markus Schmidt (AUT)	

Demtschenko is the first Russian to medal at the championships since the breakup of the Soviet Union in late 1991.

== Women's singles ==
Medal	Athlete	Time
Gold	Jana Bode (GER)	
Silver	Gabriele Kohlisch (GER)	
Bronze	Andrea Tagwerker (AUT)	

== Men's doubles ==
Medal	Athlete	Time
Gold	Germany (Stefan Krauße, Jan Behrendt)	
Silver	Italy (Gerhard Plankensteiner, Oswald Haselrieder)	
Bronze	Russia (Albert Demtschenko, Semen Kolobayev)	

As of 2010, Demtshencko is the last person to win medals in both men's singles and men's doubles at the championships.

== Mixed team ==
Medal	Athlete	Time
Gold	Germany (Jens Müller, Georg Hackl, Jana Bode, Susi Erdmann, Stefan Krauße, Jan Behrendt)	
Silver	Austria (Markus Prock, Markus Schmidt, Angelika Neuner, Andrea Tagwerker, Tobias Schiegl, Markus Schiegl)	
Bronze	Italy (Armin Zöggeler, Wilfried Huber, Gerda Weissensteiner, Natalie Obkircher, Gerhard Plankensteiner, Oswald Haselrieder)	

== Medal table ==
Rank	Nation	Gold	Silver	Bronze	Total
1	Germany (GER)	4	1	0	5
2	Austria (AUT)	0	1	2	3
3	Italy (ITA)	0	1	1	2
3	Russia (RUS)	0	1	1	2
Totals (4 entries)		4	4	4	12
