= Gerda Weissensteiner =

Italian bobsledder and luger

Personal information
- Nationality: Italian
- Born: 3 January 1969 (age 57) Bolzano, Italy
- Height: 166 cm (5 ft 5 in)
- Weight: 63 kg (139 lb)

Sport
- Country: Italy
- Sport: Luge; Bobsleigh
- Club: G.S. Forestale
Medal record
Women's luge
Olympic Games
Gold medal – first place	1994 Lillehammer	Women's singles
World Championships
Gold medal – first place	1989 Winterberg	Mixed team
Gold medal – first place	1993 Calgary	Women's singles
Silver medal – second place	1989 Winterberg	Women's singles
Silver medal – second place	1990 Calgary	Mixed team
Silver medal – second place	1995 Lillehammer	Mixed team
Bronze medal – third place	1991 Winterberg	Mixed team
Bronze medal – third place	1993 Calgary	Mixed team
Bronze medal – third place	1995 Lillehammer	Women's singles
Bronze medal – third place	1996 Altenberg	Women's singles
Bronze medal – third place	1996 Altenberg	Mixed team
Bronze medal – third place	1997 Igls	Mixed team
World Cup
Gold medal – first place	1992-93	Women's singles
Gold medal – first place	1997-98	Women's singles
Silver medal – second place	1988-89	Women's singles
Silver medal – second place	1989-90	Women's singles
Silver medal – second place	1990-91	Women's singles
Silver medal – second place	1995-96	Women's singles
European Championships
Gold medal – first place	1994 Königssee	Women's singles
Gold medal – first place	1994 Königssee	Mixed team
Silver medal – second place	1990 Igls	Women's singles
Silver medal – second place	1998 Oberhof	Mixed team
Bronze medal – third place	1988 Königssee	Mixed team
Bronze medal – third place	1990 Igls	Mixed team
Bronze medal – third place	1996 Sigulda	Mixed team
Women's bobsleigh
Olympic Games
Bronze medal – third place	2006 Turin	Two woman
World Cup
Bronze medal – third place	2002-03	Two-woman
Bronze medal – third place	2003-04	Two-woman
European Championships
Silver medal – second place	2006 St. Moritz	Two-woman

Gerda Weissensteiner OMRI (born 3 January 1969) is an Italian luger and bobsleigh pilot who competed from the late 1980s to 2006. Competing in six Winter Olympics, she won the gold medal in the women's singles luge event at the 1994 Winter Olympics in Lillehammer, and together with Jennifer Isacco she won the bronze in Turin in the two-woman bobsleigh at the 2006 Winter Olympics. She was the first Italian sportsperson to win Olympic medals in two disciplines.

== Luge career ==
Weissensteiner was introduced to luge by her uncle at the age of seven, initially sledding on natural luge tracks. She won a World Junior Luge Championship title in 1988.

Weissensteiner won eleven medals at the FIL World Luge Championships, including two gold (Women's singles: 1993, Mixed team: 1989), three silvers (Women's singles: 1989, Mixed team: 1990, 1995), and six bronzes (Women's singles: 1995, 1996; Mixed team: 1991, 1993, 1996, 1997).

She was also won seven medals at the FIL European Luge Championships with two golds (Mixed team and Women's singles: both in 1994), two silvers (Women's singles: 1990; Mixed team: 1998), and three bronzes (Mixed team: 1988, 1990, 1996).

Weissensteiner won the overall Luge World Cup title in women's singles twice (1992–3, 1997–8). She took a total of 13 wins, eight second places and eight third places in World Cup races. She was also the flagbearer at the opening ceremonies of the 1998 Winter Olympics in Nagano. Her Olympic triumph was dampened by the death of her brother in a car accident a few days later: during his funeral, a burglar broke into Weissensteiner's home and stole her gold medal. Following the Games she retired from luge, becoming a youth luge coach.

== Bobsleigh career ==
Weissensteiner returned to sledding as a bobsleigh pilot in 2001. She finished seventh in the 2-woman bobsleigh (with the former biker Antonella Bellutti, a gold medalist in track cycling) at the 2002 Winter Olympics. After the 2002 Games she teamed up with sprinter Jennifer Isacco, who she competed with until her retirement from the sport. Their best finish in the Bobsleigh World Cup was third twice in the two-woman event. (2002–3, 2003-4 (tied with Germany's Susi Erdmann)). She finished sixth in the 2-woman bobsleigh event at the 2005 FIBT World Championships in Calgary, Alberta, Canada. The following year, Weissensteiner and Isacco finished second in the European Championships, and Weissensteiner joined Erdmann as being one of only two sledders to win a medal in both bobsleigh and luge at the Winter Olympics.

She retired from all competition after the 2006 Winter Olympics in Turin. That year she was appointed as a Knight of the Order of Merit of the Italian Republic. In addition she has a rhododendron named after her: this was part of a collaboration between the Accademia dei Georgofili and the Italian National Olympic Committee to name an azalea after each medal winner at the 2006 Winter Olympics and the 2006 Winter Paralympics. Subsequently, she returned to youth coaching in luge as well as working as a press officer for the Italian Luge Federation.

== Personal life ==
Weissensteiner's son, Manuel, is also a luger.

== See also ==
- List of athletes with the most appearances at Olympic Games
- List of athletes with Olympic medals in different disciplines
- Italian sportswomen multiple medalists at Olympics and World Championships
- List of multi-sport athletes

Winter Olympics
Preceded by Deborah Compagnoni	Flag bearer for Italy; 1998 Nagano	Succeeded by Isolde Kostner
