= FIL European Luge Championships 1992 =

The FIL European Luge Championships 1992 took place in Winterberg, Germany for the second time, after hosting the event previously in 1982. It marked the first time East Germany and West Germany competed as a unified German team since the country reunified in 1990, and in the championships since 1939.

== Men's singles ==
Medal	Athlete	Time
Gold	René Friedl (GER)	
Silver	Norbert Huber (ITA)	
Bronze	Georg Hackl (GER)	

== Women's singles ==
Medal	Athlete	Time
Gold	Susi Erdmann (GER)	
Silver	Sylke Otto (GER)	
Bronze	Angelika Neuner (AUT)	

== Men's doubles ==
Medal	Athlete	Time
Gold	Italy (Hansjörg Raffl, Norbert Huber)	
Silver	Italy (Kurt Brugger, Wilfried Huber)	
Bronze	Germany (Stefan Krauße, Jan Behrendt)	

== Mixed team ==
Medal	Athlete	Time
Gold	Germany (Georg Hackl, René Friedl, Susi Erdmann, Sylke Otto, Yves Mankel, Thomas Rudolph)	
Silver	Austria (Markus Prock, Robert Manzenreiter, Angelika Neuner, Andrea Tagwerker, Gerhard Gleirscher, Markus Schmidt)	
Bronze	Italy (Norbert Huber, Oswald Haselrieder, Natalie Obkircher, Anja Plaikner, Hansjörg Raffl)	

== Medal table ==
Rank	Nation	Gold	Silver	Bronze	Total
1	Germany (GER)	3	1	2	6
2	Italy (ITA)	1	2	1	4
3	Austria (AUT)	0	1	1	2
Totals (3 entries)		4	4	4	12
