= Andrea Tagwerker =

Austrian luger

Medal record

Luge

Olympic Games
Bronze medal – third place	1994 Lillehammer	Women's singles

World Championships
Gold medal – first place	1996 Altenberg	Mixed team
Gold medal – first place	1997 Igls	Mixed team
Gold medal – first place	1999 Königssee	Mixed team
Silver medal – second place	1991 Winterberg	Mixed team

European Championships
Silver medal – second place	1992 Winterberg	Mixed team
Silver medal – second place	1996 Sigulda	Mixed team
Silver medal – second place	1998 Oberhof	Women's singles
Bronze medal – third place	1994 Königssee	Mixed team
Bronze medal – third place	1996 Sigulda	Women's singles
Bronze medal – third place	1998 Oberhof	Mixed team

Andrea Tagwerker (born 23 October 1970) is an Austrian luger who competed from the late 1980s to the early 1990s. Competing in four Winter Olympics, she won the bronze medal in the women's singles luge event at the 1994 Winter Olympics in Lillehammer. Tagwerker was the last non-German to win a women's single event in luge in 1997 at the Luge World Cup, Winter Olympic, World Championship, or European Championship level.

Tagwerker also won three gold medals in the mixed team event at the FIL World Luge Championships (1996, 1997, 1999) as well as silver medal in the mixed team event at the FIL World Luge Championships 1991. She won two medals in the women's singles event at the FIL European Luge Championships with a silver in 1998 and a bronze in 1996 as well as four medals in the mixed team event with two silvers in 1992 and 1996, and two bronzes in 1994 and 1998.

Tagwerker was also overall Luge World Cup champion in women's singles in 1996–7.
