= Wendel Suckow =

American luger (born 1967)

Medal record

Luge

World Championships
Gold medal – first place	1993 Calgary	Men's singles

Wendel Suckow (born April 11, 1967 in Marquette, Michigan) is an American luger who competed during the 1990s. He is best known for the being the first American to ever win a gold medal in luge either at the Winter Olympics or the World Championships when he was the surprise winner of the 1993 championships in Calgary, Alberta, Canada.

Suckow, along with fellow Boy Scout and future Olympic medalist Chris Thorpe, first experienced luge on a small hometown track that (later relocated to nearby Negaunee, Michigan) remains the only full-length natural track luge facility in the United States.

Competing in three Winter Olympics, Suckow's best finish was fifth in the men's singles at Lillehammer in 1994.

Suckow retired from luge after the 1998 Winter Olympics in Nagano and went to work for Team Worldwide, a logistics firm, as an account manager in Memphis, Tennessee. He later worked as an account manager for The Terminal Corporation, a logistics firm located in Baltimore, Maryland, but is no longer in that position as of 2008.
