= FIL World Luge Championships 1995 =

The FIL World Luge Championships 1995 took place in Lillehammer, Norway on 4 – 5 February.

The event was criticized for low spectator turnout, and accordingly, lacklustre marketing. Rudi Größwang claimed that the opening ceremony, which took place at the luge track and not in Lillehammer city, only had 5 spectators who were not competitors.

== Men's singles ==
Medal	Athlete	Time
Gold	Armin Zöggeler (ITA)	
Silver	Georg Hackl (GER)	
Bronze	Markus Prock (AUT)	

== Women's singles ==
Medal	Athlete	Time
Gold	Gabriele Kohlisch (GER)	
Silver	Susi Erdmann (GER)	
Bronze	Gerda Weissensteiner (ITA)	

== Men's doubles ==
Medal	Athlete	Time
Gold	Germany (Stefan Krauße, Jan Behrendt)	
Silver	United States (Chris Thorpe, Gordy Sheer)	
Bronze	Italy (Kurt Brugger, Wilfried Huber)	

== Mixed team ==
Medal	Athlete	Time
Gold	Germany (Georg Hackl, Jens Müller, Gabriele Kohlisch, Susi Erdmann, Stefan Krauße, Jan Behrendt)	
Silver	Italy (Arnold Huber, Armin Zöggeler, Natalie Obkircher, Gerda Weissensteiner, Wilfried Huber, Kurt Brugger)	
Bronze	Austria (Markus Kleinheinz, Markus Prock, Angelika Neuner, Doris Neuner, Tobias Schiegl, Markus Schiegl)	

== Medal table ==
Rank	Nation	Gold	Silver	Bronze	Total
1	Germany (GER)	3	2	0	5
2	Italy (ITA)	1	1	2	4
3	United States (USA)	0	1	0	1
4	Austria (AUT)	0	0	2	2
Totals (4 entries)		4	4	4	12
