= Semen Kolobayev =

Russian luger (born 1976)

Medal record

Luge

European Championships
Bronze medal – third place	1996 Sigulda	Men's doubles

Semen Kolobayev (born 22 August 1976) is a Russian luger who has competed in the late 1990s. He won a bronze medal in the men's doubles event at the 1996 FIL European Luge Championships in Sigulda, Latvia. He also competed in the men's doubles event at the 1998 Winter Olympics.
