= Luge at the 1994 Winter Olympics =

Luge at the XVII Olympic Winter Games
- Venue: Lillehammer Olympic Bobsleigh and Luge Track
- Dates: 13–18 February 1994
- No. of events: 3
- Competitors: 92 from 25 nations

Luge at the 1994 Winter Olympics consisted of three events at Lillehammer Olympic Bobsleigh and Luge Track. The competition took place between 13 and 18 February 1994.

== Medal summary ==
=== Medal table ===
Rank	Nation	Gold	Silver	Bronze	Total
1	Italy	2	1	1	4
2	Germany	1	1	1	3
3	Austria	0	1	1	2
Totals (3 entries)		3	3	3	9

Italy led the medal table, with its four medals the most won by that country in luge, as of 2010.

=== Events ===
Event	Gold		Silver		Bronze	
Men's singles	Georg Hackl; Germany	3:21.571	Markus Prock; Austria	3:21.584	Armin Zöggeler; Italy	3:21.833
Women's singles	Gerda Weissensteiner; Italy	3:15.517	Susi Erdmann; Germany	3:16.276	Andrea Tagwerker; Austria	3:16.652
Doubles	Italy; Kurt Brugger; Wilfried Huber	1:36.720	Italy; Hansjörg Raffl; Norbert Huber	1:36.769	Germany; Stefan Krauße; Jan Behrendt	1:36.945

== Participating NOCs ==
Twenty-five nations participated in Luge at the Lillehammer Games. Bosnia and Herzegovina, Estonia, Georgia, Greece, Russia, Slovakia and Ukraine made their Olympic luge debuts.

- Australia (1)
- Austria (8)
- Bermuda (1)
- Bosnia and Herzegovina (2)
- Bulgaria (2)
- Canada (2)
- Estonia (1)
- Great Britain (1)
- Georgia (2)
- Germany (10)
- Greece (2)
- Virgin Islands (2)
- Italy (8)
- Japan (3)
- Latvia (8)
- Liechtenstein (1)
- Norway (3)
- Poland (2)
- Romania (4)
- Russia (8)
- Switzerland (1)
- Slovakia (1)
- Sweden (5)
- Ukraine (3)
- United States (10)
