= Markus Kleinheinz =

Austrian luger (born 1976)

Medal record

Luge

Representing Austria

World Championships
Bronze medal – third place	1995 Lillehammer	Mixed team

Markus Kleinheinz (born August 27, 1976) is an Austrian luger who competed between 1994 and 2006. He won a bronze medal in the mixed team event at the 1995 FIL World Luge Championships in Lillehammer, Norway.

Kleinheinz also competed in three Winter Olympics, earning his best finish of fifth in the men's singles event at Nagano in 1998.

He was overall Luge World Cup champion in men's singles in 2002-03.
