= Markus Schmidt (luger) =

Austrian luger (born 1968)

Medal record

Men's luge

Representing Austria

Olympic Games
Bronze medal – third place	1992 Albertville	Men's singles

World Championships
Gold medal – first place	1996 Altenberg	Mixed team
Silver medal – second place	1991 Winterberg	Mixed team

European Championships
Silver medal – second place	1992 Winterberg	Mixed team
Silver medal – second place	1996 Sigulda	Mixed team
Bronze medal – third place	1994 Königssee	Mixed team
Bronze medal – third place	1996 Sigulda	Men's singles

Markus Schmidt (born 23 October 1968) is an Austrian luger who competed between 1987 and 1997. Competing in two Winter Olympics, he earned a bronze medal in the men's singles event at Albertville in 1992.

Schmidt also won two medals in the mixed team event at the FIL World Luge Championships with a gold in 1996 and a silver in 1991. He also won two silver medals in the mixed team event at the 1992 FIL European Luge Championships in Winterberg, Germany and 1996 FIL European Luge Championships in Sigulda, Latvia, bronze medal in the mixed team event at the 1994 FIL European Luge Championships in Königssee, Germany and bronze medal in the men's singles event at the 1996 FIL European Luge Championships in Sigulda, Latvia.
