= Jana Bode =

German luger

Medal record

Women's Luge

Representing Germany

World Championships
Gold medal – first place	1996 Altenberg	Women's singles
Silver medal – second place	1996 Altenberg	Mixed team
Silver medal – second place	1997 Igls	Women's singles
Bronze medal – third place	1991 Winterberg	Women's singles

World Cup Championships
Gold medal – first place	1995-96	Women's singles
Silver medal – second place	1993-94	Women's singles
Bronze medal – third place	1994-95	Women's singles
Bronze medal – third place	1996-97	Women's singles

European Championships
Gold medal – first place	1996 Sigulda	Women's singles
Gold medal – first place	1996 Sigulda	Mixed team
Silver medal – second place	1994 Königssee	Women's singles
Silver medal – second place	1994 Königssee	Mixed team

Representing West Germany

World Championships
Bronze medal – third place	1990 Calgary	Women's singles

World Cup Championships
Bronze medal – third place	1989-90	Women's singles

European Championships
Silver medal – second place	1990 Igls	Mixed team
Bronze medal – third place	1990 Igls	Women's singles

Jana Bode (born 1 March 1969) is a German former luger who competed from the late 1980s to the late 1990s.

Born in Rochlitz, she won five medals at the FIL World Luge Championships, including one gold (Women's singles: 1996), two silvers (Women's singles: 1997, Mixed team: 1996), and two bronzes (Women's singles: 1990, 1991).

Bode also won six medals at the FIL European Luge Championships with two golds (Women's singles: 1996, Mixed team: 1996), three silvers (Women's singles: 1994, Mixed team: 1990, 1994), and one bronze (Women's singles: 1990).

She finished 14th in the women's singles event at the 1994 Winter Olympics in Lillehammer.

Bode won the overall Luge World Cup title in women's singles in 1995–6.
