= FIL World Luge Championships 1990 =

The FIL World Luge Championships 1990 took place in Calgary, Alberta, Canada.

== Men's singles ==
Medal	Athlete	Time
Gold	Georg Hackl (FRG)	
Silver	Markus Prock (AUT)	
Bronze	Jens Müller (GDR)	

Hackl becomes the first person to win the world championships in consecutive years in this event.

== Women's singles ==
Medal	Athlete	Time
Gold	Gabriele Kohlisch (GDR)	
Silver	Yuliya Antipova (URS)	
Bronze	Jana Bode (FRG)	

== Men's doubles ==
Medal	Athlete	Time
Gold	Italy (Hansjorg Raffl, Norbert Huber)	
Silver	Italy (Kurt Brugger, Wilfried Huber)	
Bronze	East Germany (Jörg Hoffmann, Jochen Pietzsch)	

== Mixed team ==
Medal	Athlete	Time
Gold	East Germany (Jens Müller, Thomas Jacob, Gabriele Kohlisch, Susi Erdmann, Jörg Hoffmann, Jochen Pietzsch)	
Silver	Italy (Arnold Huber, Norbert Huber, Nadia Prinoth, Gerda Weissensteiner, Hansjorg Raffl)	
Bronze	Soviet Union (Sergey Danilin, Andrey Rochilov, Yuliya Antipova, Natalya Yakuchenko, Igor Lobanov, Genadiy Belikov)	

== Medal table ==
Rank	Nation	Gold	Silver	Bronze	Total
1	East Germany (GDR)	2	0	2	4
2	Italy (ITA)	1	2	0	3
3	West Germany (FRG)	1	0	1	2
4	Soviet Union (URS)	0	1	1	2
5	Austria (AUT)	0	1	0	1
Totals (5 entries)		4	4	4	12
