= Luge at the 1988 Winter Olympics =

Luge at the XV Olympic Winter Games
- Venue: Canada Olympic Park
- Dates: 14–19 February 1988
- Competitors: 90 from 22 nations

Luge at the 1988 Winter Olympics consisted of three events at Canada Olympic Park. The competition took place between 14 and 19 February 1988.

== Medal summary ==
=== Medal table ===
Rank	Nation	Gold	Silver	Bronze	Total
1	East Germany	3	2	1	6
2	West Germany	0	1	1	2
3	Soviet Union	0	0	1	1
Totals (3 entries)		3	3	3	9

East Germany won all three gold medals, and six medals overall. All three countries that won medals in Calgary were participating in their last Winter Olympics, the two Germanys unifying and the Soviet Union splitting up before 1992.

=== Events ===
Event	Gold		Silver		Bronze	
Men's singles	Jens Müller; East Germany	3:05.548	Georg Hackl; West Germany	3:05.916	Yury Kharchenko; Soviet Union	3:06.274
Women's singles	Steffi Walter-Martin; East Germany	3:03.973	Ute Oberhoffner-Weiß; East Germany	3:04.105	Cerstin Schmidt; East Germany	3:04.181
Doubles	East Germany; Jörg Hoffmann; Jochen Pietzsch	1:31.940	East Germany; Stefan Krauße; Jan Behrendt	1:32.039	West Germany; Thomas Schwab; Wolfgang Staudinger	1:32.274

== Participating NOCs ==
Twenty-three nations participated in Luge at the Calgary Games. The Netherlands Antilles, Bulgaria, the Philippines and the US Virgin Islands made their Olympic luge debuts.

- Argentina (1)
- Austria (7)
- Bulgaria (3)
- Canada (9)
- Czechoslovakia (2)
- France (1)
- East Germany (10)
- West Germany (7)
- Great Britain (4)
- Italy (9)
- Japan (5)
- Liechtenstein (1)
- Netherlands Antilles (1)
- Philippines (1)
- Puerto Rico (2)
- Romania (1)
- Soviet Union (10)
- Spain (1)
- Sweden (2)
- Chinese Taipei (2)
- United States (9)
- Virgin Islands (1)
- Yugoslavia (2)
