= Yuri Kharchenko =

Soviet luger (born 1963)

Medal record

Luge

Olympic Games
Bronze medal – third place	1988 Calgary	Men's singles

World Championships
Bronze medal – third place	1989 Winterberg	Mixed team

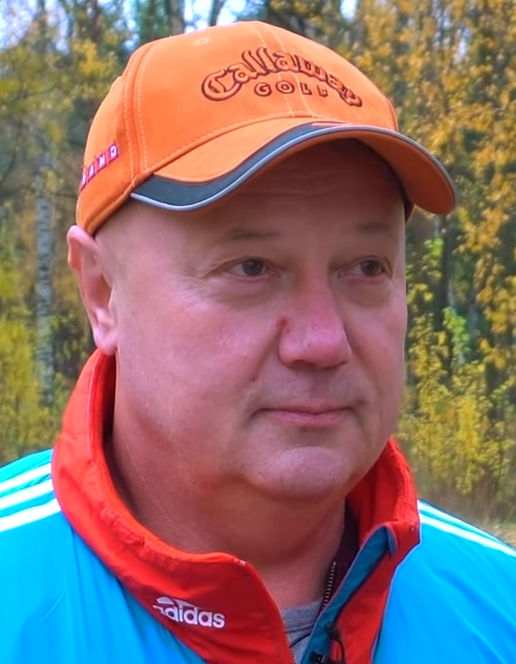
Yuri Kharchenko in October 2019

Yuri Kharchenko (born October 11, 1963) is a Soviet luger who competed during the mid to late 1980s. He won the bronze medal in the men's singles event at the 1988 Winter Olympics in Calgary.

Kharchenko also won a bronze in the mixed team event at the 1989 FIL World Luge Championships in Winterberg, West Germany. His best overall finish in the Luge World Cup was second in the men's singles in 1987–8.
