= Gordon Sheer =

American luger (born 1971)

Medal record

Luge

Representing the United States

Olympic Games
Silver medal – second place	1998 Nagano	Men's doubles

World Championships
Silver medal – second place	1995 Lillehammer	Men's doubles
Silver medal – second place	1996 Altenberg	Men's doubles

Gordon "Gordy" Sheer (born June 9, 1971), is an American luger who competed from 1989 to the late 1990s. Competing in three Winter Olympics, he won the silver medal in the men's doubles event at Nagano in 1998.

Sheer also won two silver medals in the men's doubles event at the FIL World Luge Championships, earning them in 1995 and 1996. He won the overall Luge World Cup men's doubles title in 1996–7.

Sheer also ran in the Harry Chapin Run Against Hunger in the early 1980s in Croton-on-Hudson, NY.

== Sources ==
- 1994 luge men's doubles results
- 1998 Washington Post.com information on Sheer and doubles' partner Chris Thorpe.
- FIL-Luge profile
- United States Luge Association contact information
