= Hansjörg Raffl =

Italian luger (born 1958)

Medal record

Luge
Silver medal – second place	1994 Lillehammer	Men's doubles
Bronze medal – third place	1992 Albertville	Men's doubles

World Championships
Gold medal – first place	1989 Winterberg	Mixed team
Gold medal – first place	1990 Calgary	Men's doubles
Silver medal – second place	1983 Lake Placid	Men's doubles
Silver medal – second place	1989 Winterberg	Men's doubles
Silver medal – second place	1990 Calgary	Mixed team
Silver medal – second place	1993 Calgary	Men's doubles
Bronze medal – third place	1991 Winterberg	Men's doubles
Bronze medal – third place	1991 Winterberg	Mixed team
Bronze medal – third place	1993 Calgary	Mixed team

European Championships
Gold medal – first place	1992 Winterberg	Men's doubles
Gold medal – first place	1994 Königssee	Men's doubles
Silver medal – second place	1988 Königssee	Men's doubles
Silver medal – second place	1990 Igls	Men's doubles
Bronze medal – third place	1984 Olang	Men's doubles
Bronze medal – third place	1986 Hammarstrand	Men's doubles
Bronze medal – third place	1988 Königssee	Mixed team
Bronze medal – third place	1990 Igls	Mixed team
Bronze medal – third place	1992 Winterberg	Mixed team

Hansjörg Raffl (born 29 January 1958 in Olang) is an Italian former luger who competed from the late 1970s to the mid-1990s. Competing in five Winter Olympics, he won two medals in the men's doubles event: a silver in 1994 and a bronze in 1992.

Raffl also won nine medals at the FIL World Luge Championships with two gold (Men's doubles: 1990, Mixed team: 1989), four silvers (1983, 1989, 1993; Mixed team: 1990), and three bronzes (Men's doubles: 1991, Mixed team: 1991, 1993).

He also won nine medals in the FIL European Luge Championships with two gold (Men's doubles: 1992, 1994), two silvers (Men's doubles: 1988, 1990), and five bronzes (Men's doubles: 1984, 1986; Mixed team: 1988, 1990, 1992).

Raffll also won 26 World Cup races and eight World Cup overall men's doubles titles (1982–3, 1984–5, 1985–6, 1988–9, 1989–90, 1990–1, 1991–2, 1992–3). His best World Cup overall finish in the men's singles was second in 1978–9.
