= Chris Thorpe =

American luger (born 1970)

Medal record

Luge

Representing the United States

Olympic Games
Silver medal – second place	1998 Nagano	Men's doubles
Bronze medal – third place	2002 Salt Lake City	Men's doubles

World Championships
Silver medal – second place	1995 Lillehammer	Men's doubles
Silver medal – second place	1996 Altenberg	Men's doubles

Christopher Thorpe (born October 29, 1970, in Waukegan, Illinois) is an American luger who competed from 1989 to 2002. Competing in four Winter Olympics, he won two medals in the men's doubles event with a silver in 1998 and a bronze in 2002.

Thorpe also won two silver medals in the men's doubles event at the FIL World Luge Championships, earning them in 1995 and 1996. He won the overall Luge World Cup men's doubles title in 1996–7.

While living in Marquette, Michigan, Thorpe, along with fellow Boy Scout and future World Champion Wendel Suckow, first experienced luge on a small local track that (after being relocated to nearby Negaunee, Michigan) remains the only full-length natural track luge facility in the United States.

Thorpe is a 1988 graduate of Marquette Senior High School.

Thorpe retired from luge after the 2002 Winter Olympics and is a now retired living in Farmington, New Mexico.
