= Jens Müller (luger) =

East German luger (born 1965)

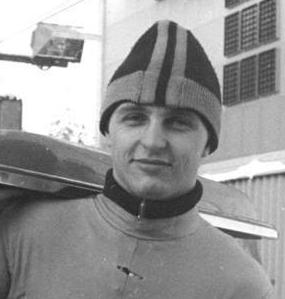
- Müller in 1987

Personal information
- Born: 6 July 1965 (age 61) Torgau, Bezirk Leipzig, East Germany
Medal record
Men's luge
Representing East Germany & Germany
Olympic Games
Gold medal – first place	1988 Calgary	Men's singles
Bronze medal – third place	1998 Nagano	Men's singles
World Championships
Gold medal – first place	1990 Calgary	Mixed team
Gold medal – first place	1991 Winterberg	Mixed team
Gold medal – first place	1995 Lillehammer	Mixed team
Gold medal – first place	2000 St. Moritz	Men's singles
Silver medal – second place	1987 Igls	Men's singles
Silver medal – second place	1989 Winterberg	Men's singles
Silver medal – second place	1989 Winterberg	Mixed team
Silver medal – second place	1996 Altenberg	Mixed team
Silver medal – second place	1997 Igls	Mixed team
Silver medal – second place	1999 Königssee	Men's singles
Silver medal – second place	2000 St. Mortiz	Mixed team
Bronze medal – third place	1985 Oberhof	Men's singles
Bronze medal – third place	1990 Calgary	Men's singles
Bronze medal – third place	1996 Altenberg	Men's singles
World Cup Championships
Silver medal – second place	1988-89	Men's singles
Silver medal – second place	1996-97	Men's singles
Silver medal – second place	1999-00	Men's singles
Bronze medal – third place	1987-88	Men's singles
Bronze medal – third place	1989-90	Men's singles
Bronze medal – third place	1990-91	Men's singles
Bronze medal – third place	1994-95	Men's singles
Bronze medal – third place	1998-99	Men's singles
European Championships
Gold medal – first place	1990 Igls	Mixed team
Gold medal – first place	1996 Sigulda	Men's singles
Gold medal – first place	1996 Sigulda	Mixed team
Gold medal – first place	1998 Oberhof	Mixed team
Gold medal – first place	2000 Winterberg	Men's singles
Silver medal – second place	1986 Hammarstrand	Men's singles
Silver medal – second place	1988 Königssee	Mixed team
Bronze medal – third place	1990 Igls	Men's singles

Jens Müller (born 6 July 1965 in Torgau, Bezirk Leipzig) is an East German-German luger who competed from 1985 to 2001. He won two medals at the Winter Olympics in men's singles with a gold at Calgary in 1988 and a bronze at Nagano in 1998.

Müller started for the ASK Vorwärts Oberhof and the BSR "Rennsteig" Oberhof. During his career, he won 14 medals at the FIL World Luge Championships, including four gold (Men's singles: 2000, Mixed team: 1990, 1991, 1995), seven silvers (Men's singles: 1987, 1989, 1999; Mixed team: 1989, 1996, 1997, 2000), and three bronzes (Men's singles: 1985, 1990, 1996).

At the FIL European Luge Championships, Müller won eight medals. This included five golds (Men's singles: 1996, 2000; Mixed team: 1990, 1996, 1998), two silvers (Men's singles: 1986; Mixed team: 1988), and one bronze (Men's singles: 1990). In Luge World Cup, Müller's best overall finish in men's singles was second three times (1988-9, 1996-7, 1999-2000).

Müller has been an honorary citizen of Ilmenau, Thuringia since 1988. He is also a skeleton coach, working with racers such as Diane Sartor and Kerstin Jürgens.
