= Kristina Bader =

German bobsledder (born 1981)

Medal record

Women's Bobsleigh

Representing Germany

World Championships
Gold medal – first place	2004 Königssee	Two-woman

Kristina Bader (born 10 November 1981) is a Soviet-born German bobsledder who competed from 2001 to 2004. She won a gold medal in the two-woman event at the 2004 FIBT World Championships in Königssee.

Bader also finished eighth in the two-woman event at the 2002 Winter Olympics in Salt Lake City while competing for Russia. She then emigrated to Germany, sitting out the 2002–2003 World Cup season before being allowed to compete.
