= Yves Mankel =

German luger (born 1970)

Medal record

Men's Luge

Representing Germany

Olympic Games
Silver medal – second place	1992 Albertville	Men's doubles

World Championships
Silver medal – second place	1991 Winterberg	Men's doubles

World Cup Championships
Silver medal – second place	1991-92	Men's doubles
Silver medal – second place	1995-96	Men's doubles

European Championships
Gold medal – first place	1992 Winterberg	Mixed team
Silver medal – second place	1994 Königssee	Mixed team
Bronze medal – third place	1994 Königssee	Men's doubles

Yves Mankel (born 12 November 1970 in Gotha, Thuringia) is a German luger who competed in the early 1990s. Together with Thomas Rudolph, he won the silver medal in the men's doubles event at the 1992 Winter Olympics in Albertville.

Mankel also won a silver in the men's doubles event at the 1991 FIL World Luge Championships in Winterberg, Germany. He also won a complete set of medals at the FIL European Luge Championships with a gold in the mixed team event (1992), a silver in the mixed team event (1994), and a bronze in the men's doubles event (1994).

Mankel's best overall finish in the Luge World Cup was second in men's doubles twice (1991-2, 1995-6).
