= Annegret Dietrich =

German-born Swiss bobsledder (born 1980)

Medal record

Women's bobsleigh

Representing Germany

World Championships
Gold medal – first place	2003 Winterberg	Two-woman

European Championships
Bronze medal – third place	2006 St. Moritz	Two-woman

Representing Switzerland

World Championships
Silver medal – second place	2009 Lake Placid	Mixed team

European Championships
Bronze medal – third place	2008 Cesana	Two-woman

Annegret "Anne" Dietrich (born 14 August 1980) is a German-born Swiss bobsledder who has competed since 2001. She won two medals at the FIBT World Championships with a gold for Germany (Two-woman: 2003) and a silver for Switzerland (Mixed team: 2009).

Dietrich competed for the Germans until the 2007-08 season and competed with the Swiss since the 2008-09 season.
