= FIL World Luge Championships 1989 =

The FIL World Luge Championships 1989 took place in Winterberg, West Germany. The mixed team event consisting of two separate runs each in men's singles, two separate runs each in women's singles, and one run in men's doubles debuted.

== Men's singles ==
Medal	Athlete	Time
Gold	Georg Hackl (FRG)	
Silver	Jens Müller (GDR)	
Bronze	Johannes Schettel (FRG)	

== Women's singles ==
Medal	Athlete	Time
Gold	Susi Erdmann (GDR)	
Silver	Gerda Weissensteiner (ITA)	
Bronze	Ute Oberhoffner-Weiss (GDR)	

== Men's doubles ==
Medal	Athlete	Time
Gold	East Germany (Stefan Krauße, Jan Behrendt)	
Silver	Italy (Hansjorg Raffl, Norbert Huber)	
Bronze	East Germany (Jörg Hoffmann, Jochen Pietzsch)	

== Mixed team ==
Medal	Athlete	Time
Gold	Italy (Hansjorg Raffl, Gerhard Plankensteiner, Gerda Weissensteiner, Veronika Oberhuber, Norbert Huber)	
Silver	East Germany (Jens Müller, René Friedl, Susi Erdmann, Ute Oberhoffner, Stefan Krauße, Jan Behrendt)	
Bronze	Soviet Union (Sergey Danilin, Yuri Kharchenko, Yuliya Antipova, Irina Kusakina, Yevgeniy Belusov, Aleksandr Belyakov)	

== Medal table ==
Rank	Nation	Gold	Silver	Bronze	Total
1	East Germany (GDR)	2	2	2	6
2	Italy (ITA)	1	2	0	3
3	West Germany (FRG)	1	0	1	2
4	Soviet Union (URS)	0	0	1	1
Totals (4 entries)		4	4	4	12
