= FIL World Luge Championships 1991 =

The FIL World Luge Championships 1991 took place in Winterberg, Germany for the second time, having previously hosted the event in 1989. It also marked the first time East Germany and West Germany competed as a unified German team.

== Men's singles ==
Medal	Athlete	Time
Gold	Arnold Huber (ITA)	
Silver	Georg Hackl (GER)	
Bronze	Markus Prock (AUT)	

== Women's singles ==
Medal	Athlete	Time
Gold	Susi Erdmann (GER)	
Silver	Gabriele Kohlisch (GER)	
Bronze	Jana Bode (GER)	

Erdmann becomes the first champion of a unified German team, leading the nation to a medal sweep in the event.

== Men's doubles ==
Medal	Athlete	Time
Gold	Germany (Stefan Krauße, Jan Behrendt)	
Silver	Germany (Yves Mankel, Thomas Rudolph)	
Bronze	Italy (Hansjorg Raffl, Norbert Huber)	

== Mixed team ==
Medal	Athlete	Time
Gold	Germany (Georg Hackl, Jens Müller, Susi Erdmann, Gabriele Kohlisch, Stefan Krauße, Jan Behrendt)	
Silver	Austria (Robert Manzenreiter, Markus Prock, Doris Neuner, Angelika Tagwerker, Gerhard Gleirscher, Markus Schmidt)	
Bronze	Italy (Arnold Huber, Gerhard Plankensteiner, Natalie Obkircher, Gerda Weissensteiner, Hansjorg Raffl, Norbert Huber)|	

== Medal table ==
Rank	Nation	Gold	Silver	Bronze	Total
1	Germany (GER)	3	3	1	7
2	Italy (ITA)	1	0	2	3
3	Austria (AUT)	0	1	1	2
Totals (3 entries)		4	4	4	12
