= Arnold Huber =

Italian luger (born 1967)

Medal record

Men's Luge

Representing Italy

World Championships
| Gold medal – first place | 1991 Winterberg | Men's singles |
| Silver medal – second place | 1990 Calgary | Mixed team |
| Silver medal – second place | 1995 Lillehammer | Mixed team |
| Bronze medal – third place | 1991 Winterberg | Mixed team |
| Bronze medal – third place | 1993 Calgary | Mixed team |

Arnold Huber (born 11 September 1967 in Bruneck, South Tyrol) is an Italian luger who competed during the 1990s. He won five medals at the FIL World Luge Championships, including one gold (Men's singles: 1991), two silver (Mixed team: 1990, 1995), and two bronze (1991, 1993).

Huber also finished fourth in the men's singles event at the 1994 Winter Olympics in Lillehammer.

He is the brother of fellow lugers Norbert Huber and Wilfried Huber and bobsledder Günther Huber.
