= Tanja Hess =

German bobsledder

Medal record

Women's Bobsleigh

Representing Germany

World Championships
Bronze medal – third place	2001 Calgary	Two-woman

Tanja Hess is a German bobsledder who competed in the late 1990s and the early 2000s. She won a bronze medal in the two-woman event at the 2001 FIBT World Championships in Calgary.
