= Markus Prock =

Austrian luger (born 1964)

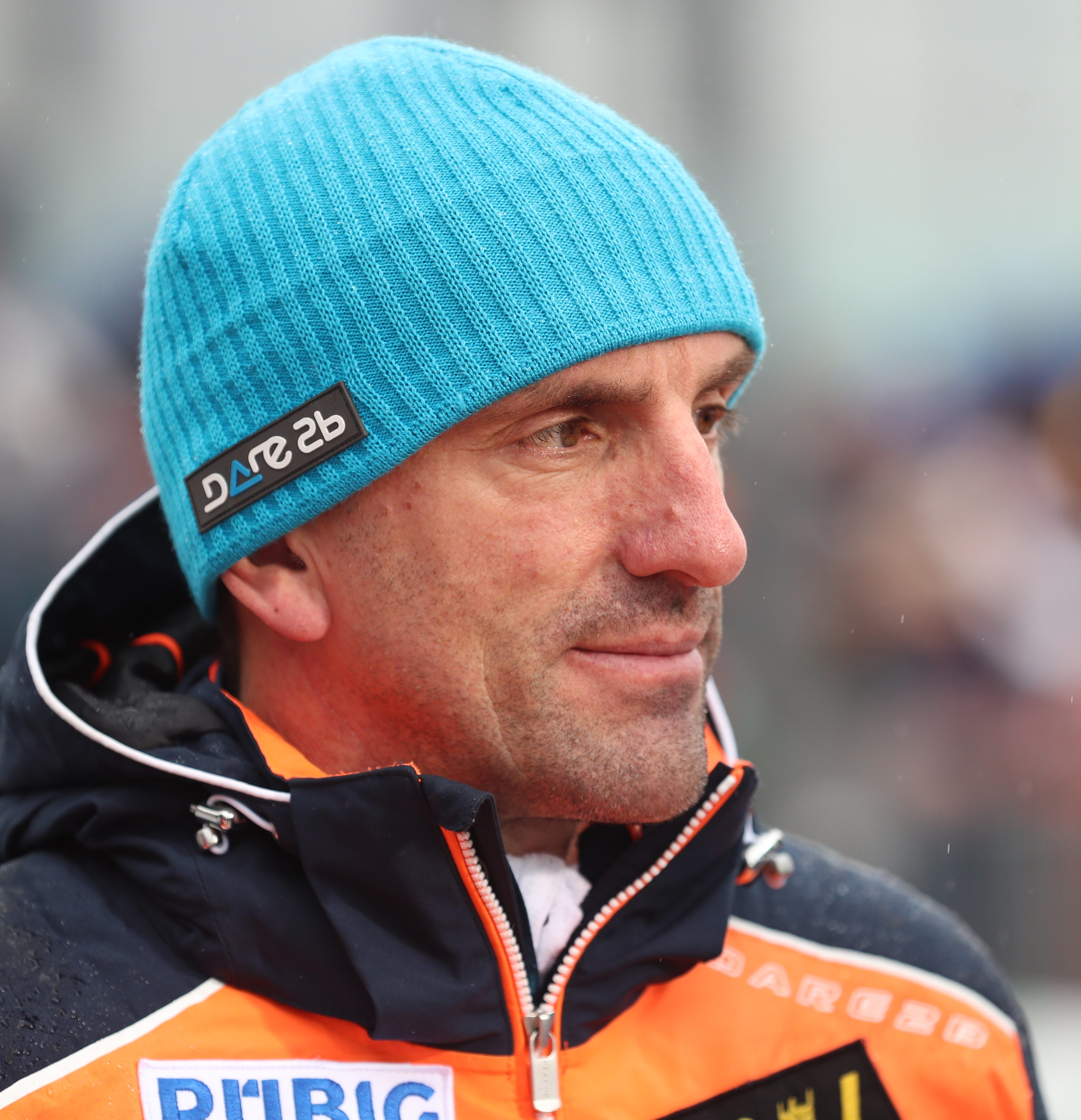
- Prock in 2019

Medal record

Men's luge

Representing Austria

Olympic Games
Silver medal – second place	1992 Albertville	Men's singles
Silver medal – second place	1994 Lillehammer	Men's singles
Bronze medal – third place	2002 Salt Lake City	Men's singles

World Championships
Gold medal – first place	1987 Igls	Men's singles
Gold medal – first place	1996 Altenberg	Men's singles
Gold medal – first place	1996 Altenberg	Mixed team
Gold medal – first place	1997 Igls	Mixed team
Gold medal – first place	1999 Königssee	Mixed team
Silver medal – second place	1990 Calgary	Men's singles
Silver medal – second place	1991 Winterberg	Mixed team
Silver medal – second place	1993 Calgary	Mixed team
Silver medal – second place	1997 Igls	Men's singles
Bronze medal – third place	1991 Winterberg	Men's singles
Bronze medal – third place	1995 Lillehammer	Men's singles
Bronze medal – third place	1995 Lillehammer	Mixed team
Bronze medal – third place	2000 St. Moritz	Mixed team
Bronze medal – third place	2001 Calgary	Men's singles

World Cup Championships
Gold medal – first place	1987-88	Men's singles
Gold medal – first place	1990-91	Men's singles
Gold medal – first place	1991-92	Men's singles
Gold medal – first place	1992-93	Men's singles
Gold medal – first place	1993-94	Men's singles
Gold medal – first place	1994-95	Men's singles
Gold medal – first place	1995-96	Men's singles
Gold medal – first place	1996-97	Men's singles
Gold medal – first place	1998-99	Men's singles
Gold medal – first place	2001-02	Men's singles
Silver medal – second place	1984-85	Men's singles
Silver medal – second place	1989-90	Men's singles
Bronze medal – third place	1986-87	Men's singles
Bronze medal – third place	2000-01	Men's singles

European Championships
Gold medal – first place	1994 Königssee	Men's singles
Gold medal – first place	1998 Oberhof	Men's singles
Gold medal – first place	2002 Altenberg	Men's singles
Silver medal – second place	1988 Königssee	Men's singles
Silver medal – second place	1990 Igls	Men's singles
Silver medal – second place	1992 Winterberg	Mixed team
Silver medal – second place	1996 Sigulda	Mixed team
Bronze medal – third place	1994 Königssee	Mixed team
Bronze medal – third place	1998 Oberhof	Mixed team
Bronze medal – third place	2002 Altenberg	Mixed team

Markus Prock (born 22 June 1964) is an Austrian luger who competed between 1983 and 2002. Born in Innsbruck, Prock competed in six Winter Olympics winning three medals in the men's singles event with two silvers (1992, 1994) and one bronze (2002).

Prock grew up in the village of Mieders in the Stubaital. His parents managed a petrol station and a pension. He competed in several sports in his youth, ski racing, playing football and sprinting, achieving personal bests of 22.8s for the 200m and 50.9s for the 400m whilst in high school. He took up luge after racing in a competition for teenagers held at Igls.

Prock was known for his rivalry with Georg Hackl, with Prock being dominant in World Cup competition whilst Hackl consistently achieved success at the Winter Olympics. Prock was noted for his athleticism and his powerful start.

At the FIL World Luge Championships, Prock won 13 medals, including five gold (Men's singles: 1987, 1996; Mixed team: 1996, 1997, 1999), four silvers (Men's singles: 1990, 1997; Mixed team: 1991, 1993), and four bronzes (Men's singles: 1995, 2001; Mixed team: 1995, 2001).

Prock won ten medals at the FIL European Luge Championships with five in men's singles (gold: 1994, 1998, 2002; silver: 1988, 1990) and five medals in the mixed team event (silver: 1992, 1996; bronze: 1994, 1998, 2002).

He also won the overall Luge World Cup ten times in men's singles (1987–88, 1990–91, 1991–92, 1992–93, 1993–94, 1994–95, 1995–96, 1996–97, 1998–99, 2001–02).

After retiring from competition, Prock was appointed as sporting director of the Austrian Luge Federation in 2002. He left this role in November 2018, when he was elected as the Federation's president, receiving 88 percent of the vote in the Federation's national conference in Semmering, Austria.

He is the father of luger Hannah Prock. He also manages his nephew, Gregor Schlierenzauer, who was second in the 2006–07 Ski jumping World Cup entering the FIS Nordic World Ski Championships 2007 in Sapporo, Japan. Schlierenzauer won a gold in the team large hill at those championships.
