= Jan Behrendt =

East German luger (born 1967)

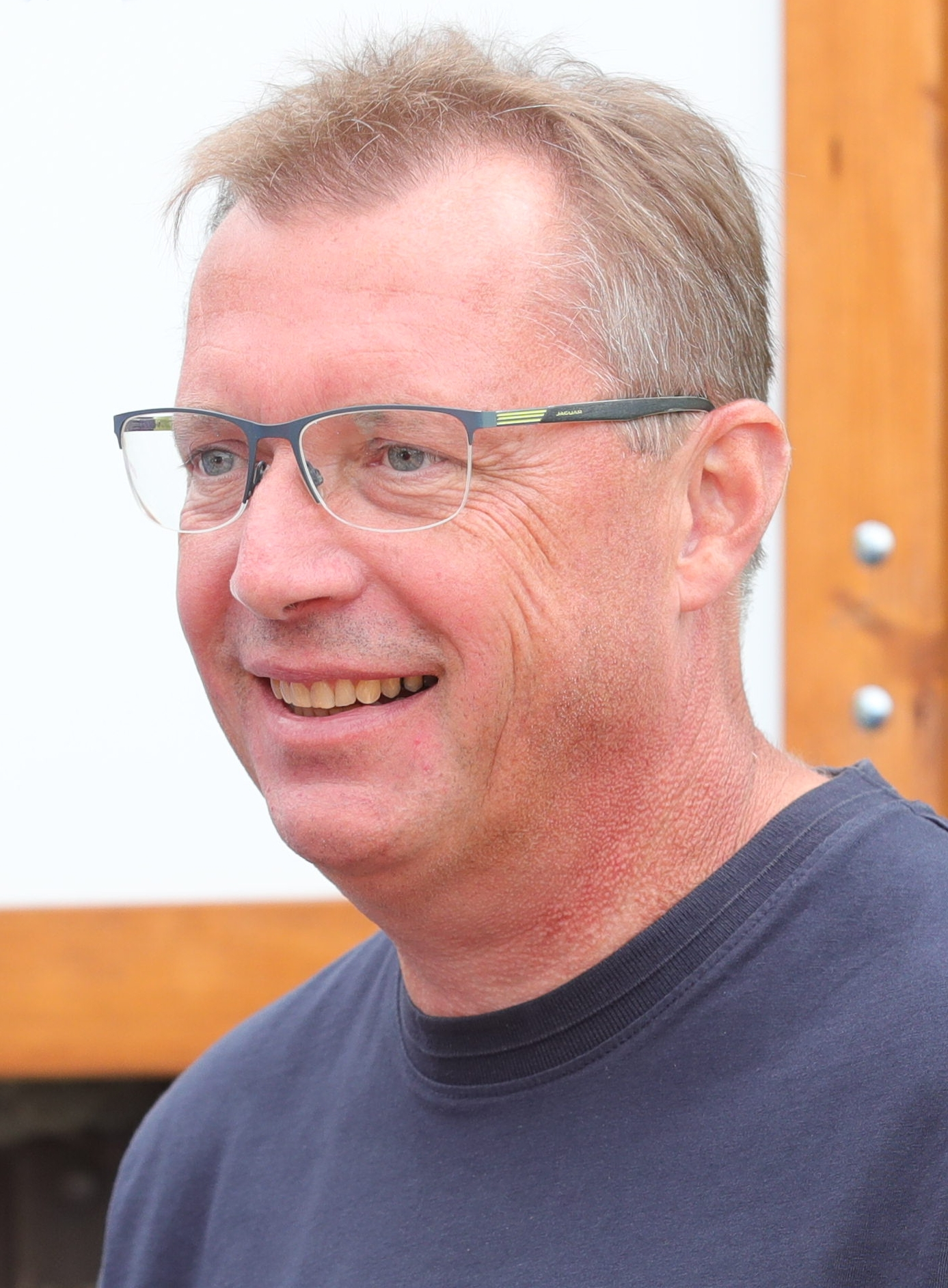

Medal record

Men's Luge

Representing East Germany

Representing Germany

Olympic Games
Gold medal – first place	1992 Albertville	Men's doubles
Gold medal – first place	1998 Nagano	Men's doubles
Silver medal – second place	1988 Calgary	Men's doubles
Bronze medal – third place	1994 Lillehammer	Men's doubles

World Championships
Gold medal – first place	1989 Winterberg	Men's doubles
Gold medal – first place	1991 Winterberg	Men's doubles
Gold medal – first place	1991 Winterberg	Mixed team
Gold medal – first place	1993 Calgary	Men's doubles
Gold medal – first place	1993 Calgary	Mixed team
Gold medal – first place	1995 Lillehammer	Men's doubles
Gold medal – first place	1995 Lillehammer	Mixed team
Silver medal – second place	1989 Winterberg	Mixed team
Silver medal – second place	1996 Altenberg	Mixed team
Silver medal – second place	1997 Igls	Men's doubles
Silver medal – second place	1997 Igls	Mixed team

World Cup Championships
Gold medal – first place	1993–94	Men's doubles
Gold medal – first place	1994–95	Men's doubles
Gold medal – first place	1995–96	Men's doubles
Silver medal – second place	1988–89	Men's doubles
Silver medal – second place	1990–91	Men's doubles
Bronze medal – third place	1991–92	Men's doubles
Bronze medal – third place	1992–93	Men's doubles

European Championships
Gold medal – first place	1996 Sigulda	Men's doubles
Gold medal – first place	1996 Sigulda	Mixed team
Gold medal – first place	1998 Oberhof	Men's doubles
Gold medal – first place	1998 Oberhof	Mixed team
Bronze medal – third place	1990 Igls	Men's doubles
Bronze medal – third place	1992 Winterberg	Men's doubles

Jan Behrendt (born 29 November 1967 in Ilmenau, Bezirk Suhl) is a former East German luger who competed from the mid-1980s to 1998. Together with Stefan Krauße he won two Olympic gold medals (1992, 1998), one silver medal (1988) and one bronze (1994) in men's doubles.

In addition, they won eleven medals at the FIL World Luge Championships with seven golds (Men's doubles: 1989, 1991, 1993, 1995; Mixed team: 1991, 1993, 1995) and four silvers (Men's doubles: 1997, Mixed team: 1989, 1996, 1997). At the FIL European Luge Championships, they won a total of six medals with four golds (Men's doubles: 1996, 1998; Mixed team: 1996, 1998) and two bronzes (Men's doubles: 1990, 1992).

They won the overall Luge World Cup men's doubles title three times (1993–94, 1994–95, 1995–96).

Behrendt and Krausse retired after the 1998 Olympics. The same year they were proclaimed honorary citizens of Ilmenau.
