= Luge at the 1998 Winter Olympics =

Luge at the XVIII Olympic Winter Games
- Venue: Spiral
- Dates: 8–11 February 1998
- No. of events: 3
- Competitors: 93 from 24 nations

Luge at the 1998 Winter Olympics consisted of three events at Spiral. The competition took place between 8 and 11 February 1998.

== Medal summary ==
=== Medal table ===
| Rank | Nation | Gold | Silver | Bronze | Total |
|---|---|---|---|---|---|
| 1 | Germany | 3 | 1 | 1 | 5 |
| 2 | United States | 0 | 1 | 1 | 2 |
| 3 | Italy | 0 | 1 | 0 | 1 |
| 4 | Austria | 0 | 0 | 1 | 1 |
| Totals (4 entries) | | 3 | 3 | 3 | 9 |

Germany led the medal table, with five medals, including a sweep of the gold medals. The two medals for the United States, both in the doubles event, were the first won by a country outside of Europe or the Soviet Union.

=== Events ===
| Event | Gold | | Silver | | Bronze | |
|---|---|---|---|---|---|---|
| Men's singles | Georg Hackl; Germany | 3:18.436 | Armin Zöggeler; Italy | 3:18.939 | Jens Müller; Germany | 3:19.093 |
| Women's singles | Silke Kraushaar; Germany | 3:23.779 | Barbara Niedernhuber; Germany | 3:23.781 | Angelika Neuner; Austria | 3:24.253 |
| Doubles | Germany; Stefan Krauße; Jan Behrendt | 1:41.105 | United States; Chris Thorpe; Gordy Sheer | 1:41.127 | United States; Mark Grimmette; Brian Martin | 1:41.217 |

== Participating NOCs ==
Twenty-four nations participated in Luge at the Nagano Games. India, South Korea, New Zealand and Venezuela made their Olympic luge debuts.

- Austria (8)
- Bermuda (1)
- Bosnia and Herzegovina (1)
- Canada (2)
- Estonia (2)
- Germany (10)
- Greece (1)
- India (1)
- Virgin Islands (1)
- Italy (10)
- Japan (9)
- South Korea (3)
- Latvia (10)
- New Zealand (1)
- Poland (2)
- Romania (3)
- Russia (1)
- Switzerland (1)
- Slovakia (1)
- Sweden (3)
- Chinese Taipei (2)
- Ukraine (6)
- United States (10)
- Venezuela (1)
