= Doris Neuner =

Austrian luger (born 1971)

Medal record

Luge

Representing Austria

Olympic Games
Gold medal – first place	1992 Albertville	Women's singles

World Championships
Silver medal – second place	1991 Winterberg	Mixed team
Silver medal – second place	1993 Calgary	Mixed team
Bronze medal – third place	1993 Calgary	Women's singles
Bronze medal – third place	1995 Lillehammer	Mixed team

Doris Neuner (born 10 May 1971) is an Austrian luger who competed during the 1990s. She won the gold medal in the women's singles event at the 1992 Winter Olympics in Albertville. Neuner's older sister, Angelika, won a silver medal in this same event at the same games and would win a bronze in this event at the 1998 Winter Olympics in Nagano.

Neuner also won four medals at the FIL World Luge Championships, winning two silvers (Mixed team: 1991, 1993) and two bronzes (Women's singles: 1993, Mixed team: 1995).

Her best finish in the overall Luge World Cup title was second in 1992-3.
