= Luge at the 1992 Winter Olympics =

Luge at the XVI Olympic Winter Games
- Venue: La Plagne
- Dates: 9–14 February 1992
- No. of events: 3
- Competitors: 89 from 22 nations

Luge at the 1992 Winter Olympics consisted of three events at La Plagne. The competition took place between 9 and 14 February 1992.

== Medal summary ==
=== Medal table ===
Rank	Nation	Gold	Silver	Bronze	Total
1	Germany	2	1	1	4
2	Austria	1	2	1	4
3	Italy	0	0	1	1
Totals (3 entries)		3	3	3	9

Germany led the medal table with four medals, including two gold.

=== Events ===
Event	Gold		Silver		Bronze	
Men's singles	Georg Hackl; Germany	3:02.363	Markus Prock; Austria	3:02.669	Markus Schmidt; Austria	3:02.942
Women's singles	Doris Neuner; Austria	3:06.696	Angelika Neuner; Austria	3:06.769	Susi Erdmann; Germany	3:07.115
Doubles	Germany; Stefan Krauße; Jan Behrendt	1:32.053	Germany; Yves Mankel; Thomas Rudolph	1:32.239	Italy; Hansjörg Raffl; Norbert Huber	1:32.298

== Participating NOCs ==
Twenty-three nations participated in Luge at the Albertville Games. Australia, Bermuda, Latvia and the Unified Team made their Olympic luge debuts.

- Argentina (1)
- Australia (1)
- Austria (7)
- Bermuda (1)
- Bulgaria (3)
- Canada (6)
- Czechoslovakia (4)
- Estonia (2)
- France (3)
- Germany (10)
- Great Britain (2)
- Italy (8)
- Japan (3)
- Latvia (6)
- Norway (2)
- Poland (2)
- Romania (3)
- Spain (1)
- Sweden (3)
- Unified Team (10)
- United States (9)
- Virgin Islands (2)
- Yugoslavia (2)
