= Georg Hackl =

German luger (born 1966)

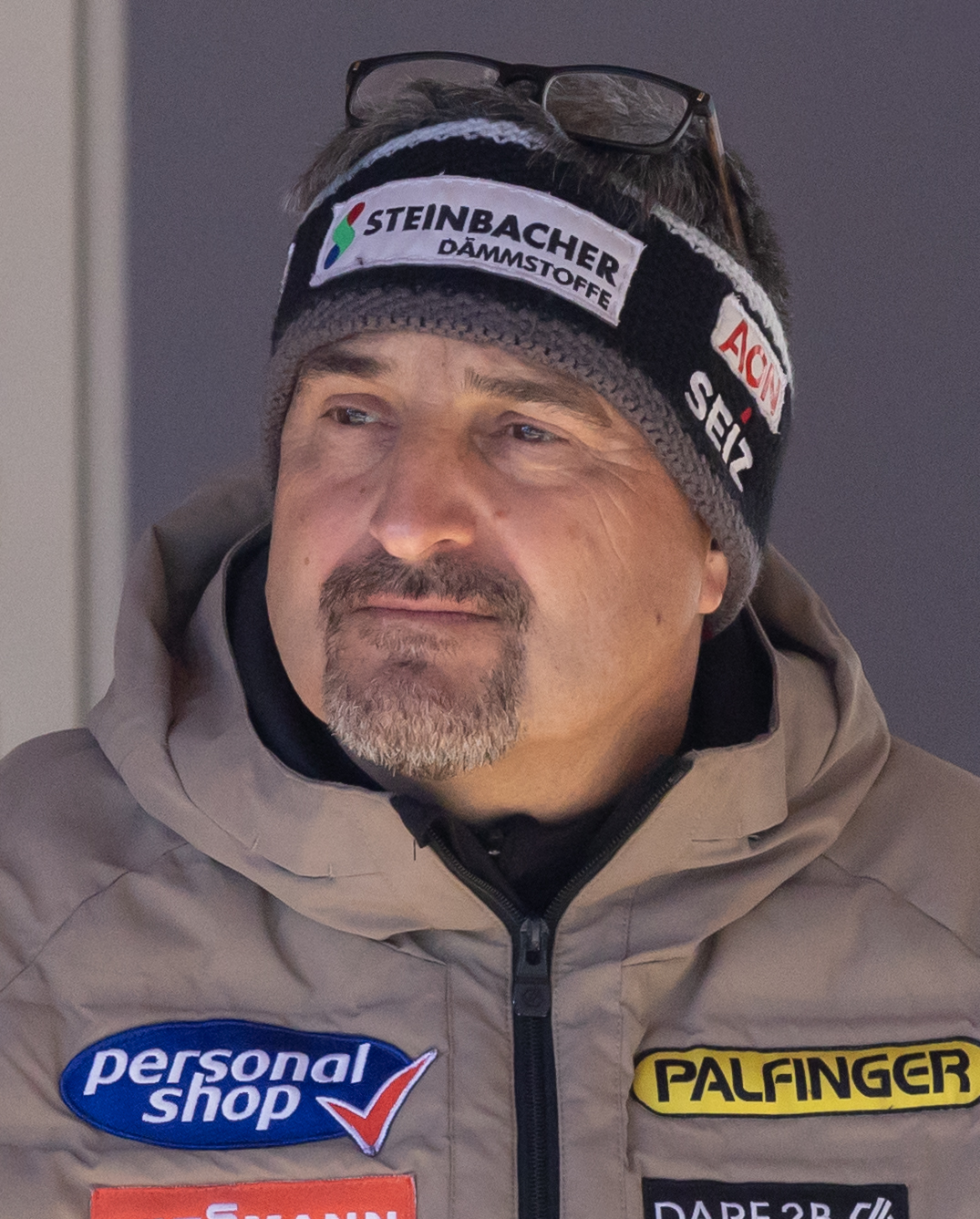
- Hackl in 2026

Personal information
- Nickname: Hackl Schorsch
- Nationality: German
- Born: 9 September 1966 (age 60) Berchtesgaden, Bavaria, West Germany
- Height: 1.72 m (5 ft 8 in)
- Weight: 79 kg (174 lb)

Sport
- Country: Germany
- Sport: Luge
- Events: Men's singles, Men's doubles
- Club: RC Berchtesgaden
- Coached by: (Germany) Josef Lenz
- Retired: 2006
Medal record
Men's Luge
Representing West Germany and Germany
Olympic Games
Gold medal – first place	1992 Albertville	Men's singles
Gold medal – first place	1994 Lillehammer	Men's singles
Gold medal – first place	1998 Nagano	Men's singles
Silver medal – second place	1988 Calgary	Men's singles
Silver medal – second place	2002 Salt Lake City	Men's singles
World Championships
Gold medal – first place	1989 Winterberg	Men's singles
Gold medal – first place	1990 Calgary	Men's singles
Gold medal – first place	1991 Winterberg	Mixed team
Gold medal – first place	1993 Calgary	Mixed team
Gold medal – first place	1995 Lillehammer	Mixed team
Gold medal – first place	1997 Igls	Men's singles
Gold medal – first place	2000 St. Moritz	Mixed team
Gold medal – first place	2001 Calgary	Mixed team
Gold medal – first place	2003 Sigulda	Mixed team
Gold medal – first place	2005 Park City	Mixed team
Silver medal – second place	1987 Igls	Men's doubles
Silver medal – second place	1991 Winterberg	Men's singles
Silver medal – second place	1993 Calgary	Men's singles
Silver medal – second place	1995 Lillehammer	Men's singles
Silver medal – second place	1996 Altenberg	Men's singles
Silver medal – second place	1996 Altenberg	Mixed team
Silver medal – second place	1997 Igls	Mixed team
Silver medal – second place	2001 Calgary	Men's singles
Silver medal – second place	2004 Nagano	Men's singles
Silver medal – second place	2005 Park City	Men's singles
Bronze medal – third place	1999 Königssee	Mixed team
Bronze medal – third place	2000 St. Moritz	Men's singles
World Cup
Gold medal – first place	1988–89	Men's singles
Gold medal – first place	1989–90	Men's singles
Silver medal – second place	1986–87	Men's doubles
Silver medal – second place	1987–88	Men's doubles
Silver medal – second place	1990–91	Men's singles
Silver medal – second place	1992–93	Men's singles
Silver medal – second place	1998–99	Men's singles
Silver medal – second place	2000–01	Men's singles
Silver medal – second place	2002–03	Men's singles
Silver medal – second place	2003–04	Men's singles
Silver medal – second place	2004–05	Men's singles
Bronze medal – third place	1985–86	Men's doubles
Bronze medal – third place	1989–90	Men's doubles
Bronze medal – third place	1991–92	Men's singles
Bronze medal – third place	1993–94	Men's singles
Bronze medal – third place	1995–96	Men's singles
Bronze medal – third place	1999–2000	Men's singles
Bronze medal – third place	2001–02	Men's singles
European Championships
Gold medal – first place	1988 Königssee	Men's singles
Gold medal – first place	1990 Igls	Men's singles
Gold medal – first place	1988 Königssee	Mixed team
Gold medal – first place	1992 Winterberg	Mixed team
Gold medal – first place	1996 Sigulda	Mixed team
Gold medal – first place	2000 Winterberg	Mixed team
Gold medal – first place	2002 Altenberg	Mixed team
Silver medal – second place	1990 Igls	Mixed team
Silver medal – second place	1994 Königssee	Men's singles
Silver medal – second place	1994 Königssee	Mixed team
Silver medal – second place	2000 Winterberg	Men's singles
Bronze medal – third place	1992 Winterberg	Men's singles
Men's Wok
World Wok Racing Championships
Gold medal – first place	2004 Innsbruck	Men's singles
Gold medal – first place	2005 Winterberg	Men's singles
Gold medal – first place	2007 Innsbruck	Men's singles
Gold medal – first place	2008 Altenberg	Men's singles
Gold medal – first place	2009 Winterberg	Men's singles
Gold medal – first place	2010 Oberhof	Men's singles
Gold medal – first place	2011 Innsbruck	Men's singles
Silver medal – second place	2006 Innsbruck	Men's singles
Silver medal – second place	2008 Altenberg	Four-man

Georg Hackl (born 9 September 1966), often named Hackl Schorsch (German pronunciation: [ˈhakl̩ ʃɔʁʃ]), is a German former luger who was three time Olympic and World Champion. He is known affectionately as Hackl-Schorsch or as the Speeding Weißwurst, a reference to what he looks like in his white bodysuit coming down the luge at fast speeds.

== Biography ==
Hackl was born in Berchtesgaden, Bavaria. He took up luge as part of his physical education lessons whilst at school, learning to slide at the Königssee track.

Hackl was known for his rivalry with Markus Prock, with Prock being dominant in World Cup competition whilst Hackl consistently achieved success at the Winter Olympics. Although Hackl was not as natural an athlete as Prock, he was noted as being extremely skilled at setting up his sled to suit particular ice conditions on a given day. In addition his coach and former luger Thomas Schwab highlighted Hackl's mental strength as being key to his success.

He won his first Winter Olympic Games luge medal in 1988 in Calgary, when he finished second in the singles event, while placing fourth in the doubles. Four years later, he improved his performance to win the gold, a feat he repeated in 1994 and 1998. In 1998, he won the gold by clocking the fastest time in all four runs, the first in Olympic history in the men's singles to do so (Vera Zozula of the Soviet Union did that feat in the women's singles event at the 1980 Winter Olympics in Lake Placid, New York). That year he was named as German Sportsman of the Year. Hackl won the silver medal again in the 2002 Games, becoming the first Winter Olympian to win a medal in five consecutive Winter Olympics. Most recently, he placed 7th in the 2006 Winter Olympics.

Hackl retired from active participation and got involved in coaching after the 2006 Winter Olympics. He is responsible for a group of German lugers nicknamed the "Sunshine Training Group", alongside Patric Leitner, with Hackl having responsibility for their sleds. Members of the group include Felix Loch, Natalie Geisenberger, Tobias Wendl and Tobias Arlt, who between them took a clean sweep of the gold medals in luge at the 2014 Winter Olympics.

Hackl won a total of 22 medals at the FIL World Luge Championships, including ten golds (Men's singles: 1989, 1990, 1997; Mixed team: 1991, 1993, 1995, 2000, 2001, 2003, 2005), ten silvers (Men's singles: 1991, 1993, 1995, 1996, 2001, 2004, 2005; Men's doubles: 1987, Mixed team: 1996, 1997), and two bronzes (Men's singles: 2000, Mixed team: 1999).

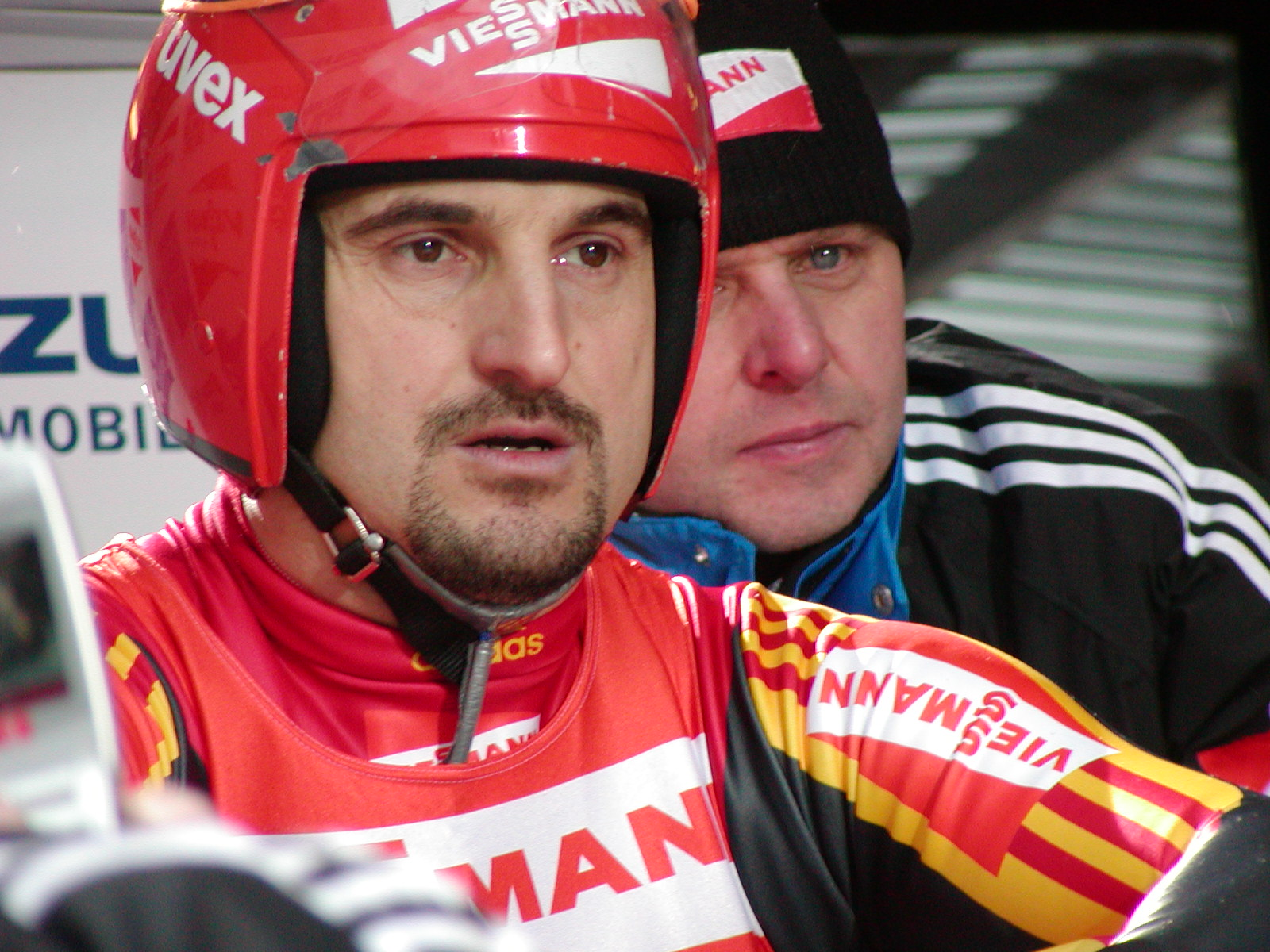
Hackl in Oberhof, Germany in 2005

At the FIL European Luge Championships, Hackl won twelve medals. This included seven golds (Men's singles: 1988, 1990; Mixed team: 1988, 1992, 1996, 2000, 2002), four silvers (Men's singles: 1994, 2000; Mixed team: 1990, 1994), and one bronze (Men's singles: 1992).

He won the overall Luge World Cup title in men's singles twice (1988–9, 1989–90) and also had his best overall finish of second in men's doubles twice (1986–7, 1987–8).

Hackl is also a nine-time wok racing world champion.

He was inducted into the International Luge Federation's Hall of Fame in 2013.

In 1999, Hackl married his long-term girlfriend, Margit (née Datzmann).

== See also ==
- List of multiple Olympic gold medalists in one event

Awards and achievements
Preceded by (Germany) Jan Ullrich	German Sportsman of the Year; 1998	Succeeded by (Germany) Martin Schmitt
