= Sweden at the 1980 Winter Olympics =

- IOC code: SWE
- NOC: Swedish Olympic Committee
- Website: www.sok.se (in Swedish and English)

in Lake Placid
- Competitors: 61 (49 men, 12 women) in 9 sports
- Flag bearers: Eva Olsson, cross-country skiing
- Medals Ranked 5th: Gold 3 Silver 0 Bronze 1 Total 4

Winter Olympics appearances (overview)
- 1924; 1928; 1932; 1936; 1948; 1952; 1956; 1960; 1964; 1968; 1972; 1976; 1980; 1984; 1988; 1992; 1994; 1998; 2002; 2006; 2010; 2014; 2018; 2022; 2026

Sweden competed at the 1980 Winter Olympics in Lake Placid, United States.

== Medalists ==
Medal	Name	Sport	Event
Gold	Ingemar Stenmark	Alpine skiing	Men's giant slalom
Gold	Ingemar Stenmark	Alpine skiing	Men's slalom
Gold	Thomas Wassberg	Cross-country skiing	Men's 15 km
Bronze	Sweden men's national ice hockey team: Mats Waltin; Ulf Weinstock; Lennart Norberg; Tommy Samuelsson; Dan Söderström; Per Lundqvist; Lars Molin; Mats Näslund; William Löfqvist; Harald Lückner; Bengt Lundholm; Leif Holmgren; Tomas Jonsson; Pelle Lindbergh; Håkan Eriksson; Jan Eriksson; Thomas Eriksson; Mats Åhlberg; Sture Andersson; Bo Berglund	Ice hockey	Men's competition

== Alpine skiing ==
Men

Athlete	Event	Race 1		Race 2		Total	
Athlete	Event	Time	Rank	Time	Rank	Time	Rank
Stig Strand	Giant Slalom	1:23.37	32	1:25.25	31	2:48.62	28
Torsten Jakobsson	Giant Slalom	1:23.24	31	1:23.18	17	2:46.42	21
Ingemar Stenmark	Giant Slalom	1:20.49	3	1:20.25	1	2:40.74	1st place, gold medalist(s)
Torsten Jakobsson	Slalom	DSQ	–	–	–	DSQ	–
Stig Strand	Slalom	55.64	16	DNF	–	DNF	–
Ingemar Stenmark	Slalom	53.89	4	50.37	1	1:44.26	1st place, gold medalist(s)

Women

Athlete	Event	Race 1		Race 2		Total	
Athlete	Event	Time	Rank	Time	Rank	Time	Rank
Åsa Svedmark	Giant Slalom	1:18.90	29	1:31.47	25	2:50.37	24
Anna-Karin Hesse	Giant Slalom	1:17.24	12	1:29.78	13	2:47.02	11
Ann Melander	Giant Slalom	1:16.84	10	1:30.79	19	2:47.63	15
Anna-Karin Hesse	Slalom	DNF	–	–	–	DNF	–
Åsa Svedmark	Slalom	46.06	18	45.45	9	1:31.51	12
Ann Melander	Slalom	44.51	11	45.31	8	1:29.82	9

== Biathlon ==
Men

Event	Athlete	Misses ^{1}	Time	Rank
10 km Sprint	Per Andersson	2	35:55.57	22
10 km Sprint	Ronnie Adolfsson	3	35:14.87	15
10 km Sprint	Sören Wikström	2	34:57.01	14

Event	Athlete	Time	Penalties	Adjusted time ^{2}	Rank
20 km	Sven Fahlén	1'09:49.23	8	1'17:49.23	31
20 km	Sören Wikström	1'08:13.34	5	1'13:13.34	12
20 km	Ronnie Adolfsson	1'08:10.90	5	1'13:10.90	11

Men's 4 x 7.5 km relay

Athletes	Race		
Athletes	Misses ^{1}	Time	Rank
Sven Fahlén; Per Andersson; Sören Wikström; Ronnie Adolfsson	6	1'40:44.62	10

^{1} A penalty loop of 150 metres had to be skied per missed target.
^{2} One minute added per close miss (a hit in the outer ring), two minutes added per complete miss.

== Bobsleigh ==
Sled	Athletes	Event	Run 1		Run 2		Run 3		Run 4		Total	
Sled	Athletes	Event	Time	Rank	Time	Rank	Time	Rank	Time	Rank	Time	Rank
SWE-1	Carl-Erik Eriksson; Kenth Rönn	Two-man	1:03.56	9	1:04.49	14	1:03.22	8	1:05.65	20	4:16.92	15

Sled	Athletes	Event	Run 1		Run 2		Run 3		Run 4		Total	
Sled	Athletes	Event	Time	Rank	Time	Rank	Time	Rank	Time	Rank	Time	Rank
SWE-1	Carl-Erik Eriksson; Peter Jansson; Runald Beckman; Kenth Rönn	Four-man	1:01.01	6	1:01.00	5	1:00.36	5	DSQ	–	DSQ	–

== Cross-country skiing ==
Men

Event	Athlete	Race	
Event	Athlete	Time	Rank
15 km	Sven-Erik Danielsson	43:41.21	18
15 km	Benny Kohlberg	43:39.22	17
15 km	Thomas Eriksson	43:11.88	11
15 km	Thomas Wassberg	41:57.63	1st place, gold medalist(s)
30 km	Stig Jäder	1'32:08.09	25
30 km	Sven-Åke Lundbäck	1'31:31.96	17
30 km	Benny Kohlberg	1'30:57.56	13
30 km	Thomas Wassberg	1'28:40.35	4
50 km	Stig Jäder	DNF	–
50 km	Erik Gustavsson	2'43:39.93	34
50 km	Thomas Eriksson	2'36:33.85	16
50 km	Sven-Åke Lundbäck	2'31:59.65	8

Men's 4 × 10 km relay

Athletes	Race	
Athletes	Time	Rank
Sven-Åke Lundbäck; Thomas Eriksson; Benny Kohlberg; Thomas Wassberg	2'00:42.71	5

Women

Event	Athlete	Race	
Event	Athlete	Time	Rank
5 km	Karin Lamberg	15:55.07	17
5 km	Eva Olsson	15:48.59	12
5 km	Marie Johansson	15:47.19	11
5 km	Lena Carlzon-Lundbäck	15:43.04	10
10 km	Karin Lamberg	32:10.44	17
10 km	Marie Johansson	31:48.57	15
10 km	Lena Carlzon-Lundbäck	31:45.50	11
10 km	Eva Olsson	31:36.08	10

Women's 4 × 5 km relay

Athletes	Race	
Athletes	Time	Rank
Marie Johansson; Karin Lamberg; Eva Olsson; Lena Carlzon-Lundbäck	1'05:16.32	6

== Figure skating ==
Men

Athlete	CF	SP	FS	Points	Places	Rank
Thomas Öberg	14	14	14	149.80	127	14

== Ice hockey ==
Summary

Team	Event	Group stage						Medal round / consolation round		
Team	Event	Opposition Score	Opposition Score	Opposition Score	Opposition Score	Opposition Score	Rank	Opposition Score	Opposition Score	Rank
Sweden men's	Men's tournament	United States; T 2–2	Romania; W 8–0	West Germany; W 5–2	Norway; W 7–1	Czechoslovakia; W 4–2	1 Q MR	Finland; T 3–3	Soviet Union; L 2–9	3rd place, bronze medalist(s)

=== First round - Blue Division ===
Team advanced to the Final Round
Team advanced to consolation round

Team	GP	W	L	T	GF	GA	Pts
Sweden	5	4	0	1	26	7	9
United States	5	4	0	1	25	10	9
Czechoslovakia	5	3	2	0	34	16	6
Romania	5	1	3	1	13	29	3
West Germany	5	1	4	0	21	30	2
Norway	5	0	4	1	9	36	1

All times are local (UTC-5).

12 February 1980; 17:21	Sweden	2 – 2 (1–0, 0–1, 1–1)	United States	Olympic Fieldhouse, Lake Placid

Referee:
Dombrovski

Andersson (Molin, Lundqvist) - 11:04	1 – 0
	1 – 1	39:32 - Silk (Ramsey, Johnson)
T. Eriksson (Lückner) - 44:45	2 – 1
	2 – 2	59:33 - Baker (Pavelich, Schneider)

8 min
Penalties
6 min
36
Shots
29

14 February 1980; 13:00	Romania	0 – 8 (0–3, 0–4, 0–1)	Sweden	Olympic Arena, Lake Placid

Referee:
(Finland) Karl-Gustav Kaisla

0 – 1	00:40 - Åhlberg (Näslund)
0 – 2	05:59 - Lundqvist (Samuelsson, Berglund)
0 – 3	07:42 - J. Eriksson (Waltin)
0 – 4	21:50 - T. Eriksson (Söderström, Molin) (PP)
0 – 5	28:05 - Molin
0 – 6	32:31 - Molin (Berglund)
0 – 7	37:17 - Lundholm (H. Eriksson)
0 – 8	50:18 - Jonsson (Holmgren)

26 min
Penalties
15 min
19
Shots
44

16 February 1980; 20:00	Sweden	5 – 2 (1–0, 4–1, 0–1)	West Germany	Olympic Arena, Lake Placid

Referee:
Dombrovski

Berglund (Molin, Lundqvist) - 09:52	1 – 0
Näslund (Åhlberg) - 26:50	2 – 0
Lundqvist (Berglund, Samuelsson) - 28:35	3 – 0
Söderström (Åhlberg) - 32:36	4 – 0
Söderström (H. Eriksson) (PP) - 36:03	5 – 0
	5 – 1	37:06 - Egen (Truntschka)
	5 – 2	56:43 - Reil (SH)

24 min
Penalties
31 min
33
Shots
25

18 February 1980; 13:30	Norway	1 – 7 (0–2, 0–4, 1–1)	Sweden	Olympic Fieldhouse, Lake Placid

Referee:
(Czechoslovakia) Vladimir Šubrt

	0 – 1	14:03 - Åhlberg (Näslund)
	0 – 2	16:20 - Åhlberg (Näslund, Holmgren)
	0 – 3	23:48 - Åhlberg (Jonsson) (PP)
	0 – 4	34:08 - Lundqvist (Lückner, Molin)
	0 – 5	36:40 - Norberg (H. Eriksson, Waltin)
	0 – 6	37:09 - Andersson (Lundqvist, Molin)
	0 – 7	43:24 - Näslund (Åhlberg, Weinstock) (PP)
Abrahamsen (Molberg, Foyn) - 51:08	1 – 7

8 min
Penalties
8 min
12
Shots
43

20 February 1980; 13:30	Czechoslovakia	2 – 4 (0–2, 0–1, 2–1)	Sweden	Olympic Fieldhouse, Lake Placid

Referee:
(Finland) Karl-Gustav Kaisla

	0 – 1	09:18 - Åhlberg (Näslund, Holmgren) (PP)
	0 – 2	10:55 - Holmgren (Näslund, Weinstock)
	0 – 3	36:02 - Näslund (Söderström) (PP)
Nový (Pouzar) - 52:05	1 – 3
	1 – 4	57:00 - Lundqvist (Näslund, Jonsson)
Pouzar (Nový, Kadlec) (PP) - 59:22	2 – 4

6 min
Penalties
10 min
43
Shots
26

=== Final round ===
The top two teams from each group play the top two teams from the other group once. Points from previous games against their own group carry over, excluding teams who failed to make the medal round.

Team	GP	W	L	T	GF	GA	Pts
United States	3	2	0	1	10	7	5
Soviet Union	3	2	1	0	16	8	4
Sweden (bronze)	3	0	1	2	7	14	2
Finland	3	0	2	1	7	11	1

22 February 1980; 20:42	Finland	3 – 3 (1–0, 1–1, 1–2)	Sweden	Olympic Fieldhouse, Lake Placid

Referee:
Neagles

Leinonen (Porvari, Kiimalainen) - 03:00	1 – 0
Porvari (Eloranta) - 27:06	2 – 0
	2 – 1	30:25 - Weinstock
	2 – 2	45:24 - Jonsson (Åhlberg, Holmgren)
	2 – 3	46:14 - Waltin (Norberg)
Leinonen (Porvari) - 47:59	3 – 3

6 min
Penalties
6 min
25
Shots
30

24 February 1980; 14:30	Sweden	2 – 9 (0–4, 0–5, 2–0)	Soviet Union	Olympic Fieldhouse, Lake Placid

Referee:
Haley

	0 – 1	00:36 - Petrov (Kharlamov)
	0 – 2	05:52 - Makarov (A. Golikov)
	0 – 3	10:31 - Maltsev (Bilyaletdinov, Pervukhin)
	0 – 4	17:38 - Mikhailov (Kharlamov, Pervukhin)
	0 – 5	20:33 - Vasiliev
	0 – 6	27:18 - Krutov (Pervukhin)
	0 – 7	28:14 - Skvortsov (Balderis, Pervukhin)
	0 – 8	34:51 - Zhluktov (Balderis, Skvortsov)
	0 – 9	35:02 - Fetisov
Åhlberg (Weinstock, Holmgren) - 49:17	1 – 9
Holmgren (Näslund) - 54:21	2 – 9

8 min
Penalties
12 min
26
Shots
28

Carried over group match:

- Sweden 2–2 USA (United States)
- Team roster
- Pelle Lindbergh
- William Löfqvist
- Sture Andersson
- Jan Eriksson
- Thomas Eriksson
- Tomas Jonsson
- Tommy Samuelsson
- Mats Waltin
- Ulf Weinstock
- Bo Berglund
- Håkan Eriksson
- Leif Holmgren
- Bengt Lundholm
- Per Lundqvist
- Harald Lückner
- Lars Molin
- Lennart Norberg
- Mats Näslund
- Dan Söderström
- Mats Åhlberg
- Head coach: Tommy Sandlin

== Luge ==
Men

Athlete	Run 1		Run 2		Run 3		Run 4		Total	
Athlete	Time	Rank	Time	Rank	Time	Rank	Time	Rank	Time	Rank
Stefan Kjernholm	44.565	14	44.905	11	44.900	10	48.538	22	3:02.908	18

(Men's) Doubles

Athletes	Run 1		Run 2		Total	
Athletes	Time	Rank	Time	Rank	Time	Rank
Stefan Kjernholm; Kenneth Holm	40.415	13	41.024	13	1:21.439	12

Women

Athlete	Run 1		Run 2		Run 3		Run 4		Total	
Athlete	Time	Rank	Time	Rank	Time	Rank	Time	Rank	Time	Rank
Anneli Näsström	40.987	23	41.096	22	40.999	17	40.877	17	2:43.959	19
Agneta Lindskog	40.219	13	40.547	14	40.463	13	40.388	12	2:41.617	13

== Ski jumping ==
Athlete	Event	Jump 1		Jump 2		Total	
Athlete	Event	Distance	Points	Distance	Points	Points	Rank
Jan Holmlund	Normal hill	75.0	101.7	71.0	93.8	195.5	34
Jan Holmlund	Large hill	75.0	26.2	DNS	–	26.2	50

== Speed skating ==
Men

Event	Athlete	Race	
Event	Athlete	Time	Rank
500 m	Johan Granath	1:21.44	36
500 m	Oloph Granath	39.15	12
500 m	Jan-Åke Carlberg	39.03	10
1000 m	Johan Granath	DNF	–
1000 m	Jan-Åke Carlberg	1:19.13	16
1000 m	Oloph Granath	1:17.74	8
1500 m	Jan Junell	2:02.11	21
1500 m	Ulf Ekstrand	2:00.23	16
1500 m	Tomas Gustafson	1:58.18	7
5000 m	Jan Junell	7:19.50	14
5000 m	Tomas Gustafson	7:16.85	12
5000 m	Ulf Ekstrand	7:13.13	8
10,000 m	Ulf Ekstrand	15:33.42	21
10,000 m	Örjan Sandler	15:11.52	14
10,000 m	Tomas Gustafson	15:05.18	12

Women

Event	Athlete	Race	
Event	Athlete	Time	Rank
500 m	Annette Karlsson	44.52	24
500 m	Sylvia Filipsson	44.05	16
500 m	Ann-Sofie Järnström	42.47	4
1000 m	Annette Karlsson	1:28.25	10
1000 m	Sylvia Filipsson	1:28.18	9
1000 m	Ann-Sofie Järnström	1:28.10	8
1500 m	Annette Karlsson	2:17.31	20
1500 m	Sylvia Filipsson	2:12.84	5
3000 m	Annette Karlsson	4:52.70	18
3000 m	Sylvia Filipsson	4:40.22	7
