= List of 1980 Winter Olympics medal winners =

The 1980 Winter Olympics, formally known as the XIII Olympic Winter Games, took place February 13 through 24, 1980 in Lake Placid, New York, United States. A total of 1,072 athletes representing 37 National Olympic Committees took part. There were 38 medal events contested at these Olympics.

Venues for the events were the Olympic Center (later renamed Herb Brooks Arena), Whiteface Mountain, Mt. Van Hoevenberg Olympic Bobsled Run, the Olympic Ski Jumps, the Cascade Cross Country Ski Center, and the Lake Placid High School Speed Skating Oval.

== Alpine skiing ==
Event	Gold	Silver	Bronze
Men's downhill	Leonhard Stock; Austria	Peter Wirnsberger; Austria	Steve Podborski; Canada
Men's slalom	Ingemar Stenmark; Sweden	Phil Mahre; United States	Jacques Luthy; Switzerland
Men's giant slalom	Ingemar Stenmark; Sweden	Andreas Wenzel; Liechtenstein	Hans Enn; Austria
Women's downhill	Annemarie Moser-Pröll; Austria	Hanni Wenzel; Liechtenstein	Marie-Theres Nadig; Switzerland
Women's slalom	Hanni Wenzel; Liechtenstein	Christa Kinshofer; West Germany	Erika Hess; Switzerland
Women's giant slalom	Hanni Wenzel; Liechtenstein	Irene Epple; West Germany	Perrine Pelen; France

== Biathlon ==
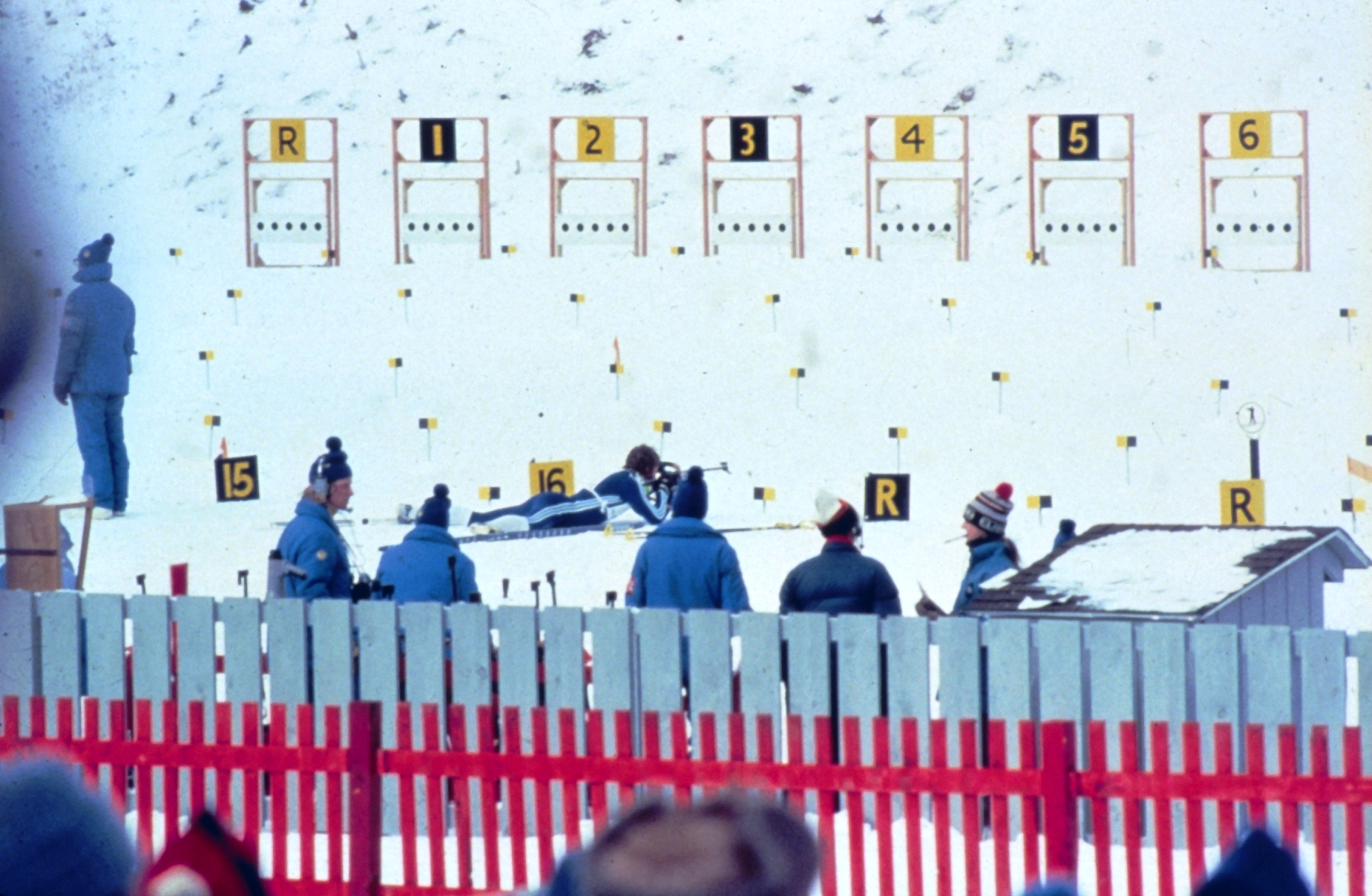
Biathlon at the 1980 Winter Olympics

Event	Gold	Silver	Bronze
Men's 10 km	Frank Ullrich; East Germany	Vladimir Alikin; Soviet Union	Anatoly Alyabyev; Soviet Union
Men's 20 km	Anatoly Alyabyev; Soviet Union	Frank Ullrich; East Germany	Eberhard Rösch; East Germany
Men's 4 × 7.5 km	Soviet Union; Vladimir Alikin; Aleksandr Tikhonov; Vladimir Barnashov; Anatoly Alyabyev	East Germany; Mathias Jung; Klaus Siebert; Frank Ullrich; Eberhard Rösch	West Germany; Gerhard Winkler; Peter Angerer; Hans Estner; Franz Bernreiter

== Bobsleigh ==
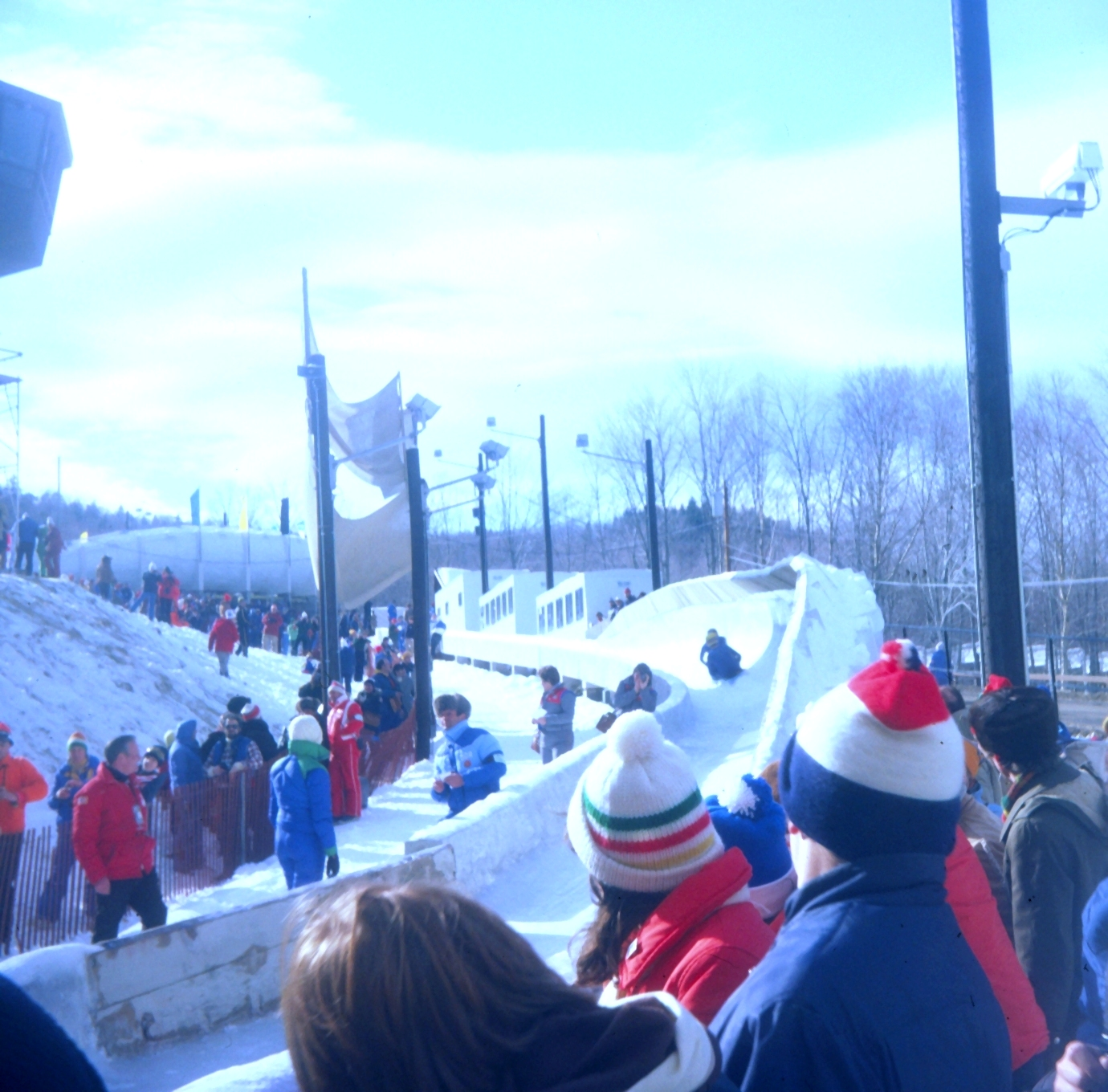
Bob run during the 1980 Winter Olympics

Event	Gold	Silver	Bronze
Two-man	Switzerland; Erich Schärer; Joseph Benz	East Germany; Bernhard Germeshausen; Hans-Jürgen Gerhardt	East Germany; Meinhard Nehmer; Bogdan Musioł
Four-man	East Germany; Meinhard Nehmer; Bogdan Musioł; Bernhard Germeshausen; Hans-Jürgen Gerhardt	Switzerland; Erich Schärer; Ulrich Bächli; Rudolf Marti; Joseph Benz	East Germany; Horst Schönau; Roland Wetzig; Detlef Richter; Andreas Kirchner

== Cross-country skiing ==
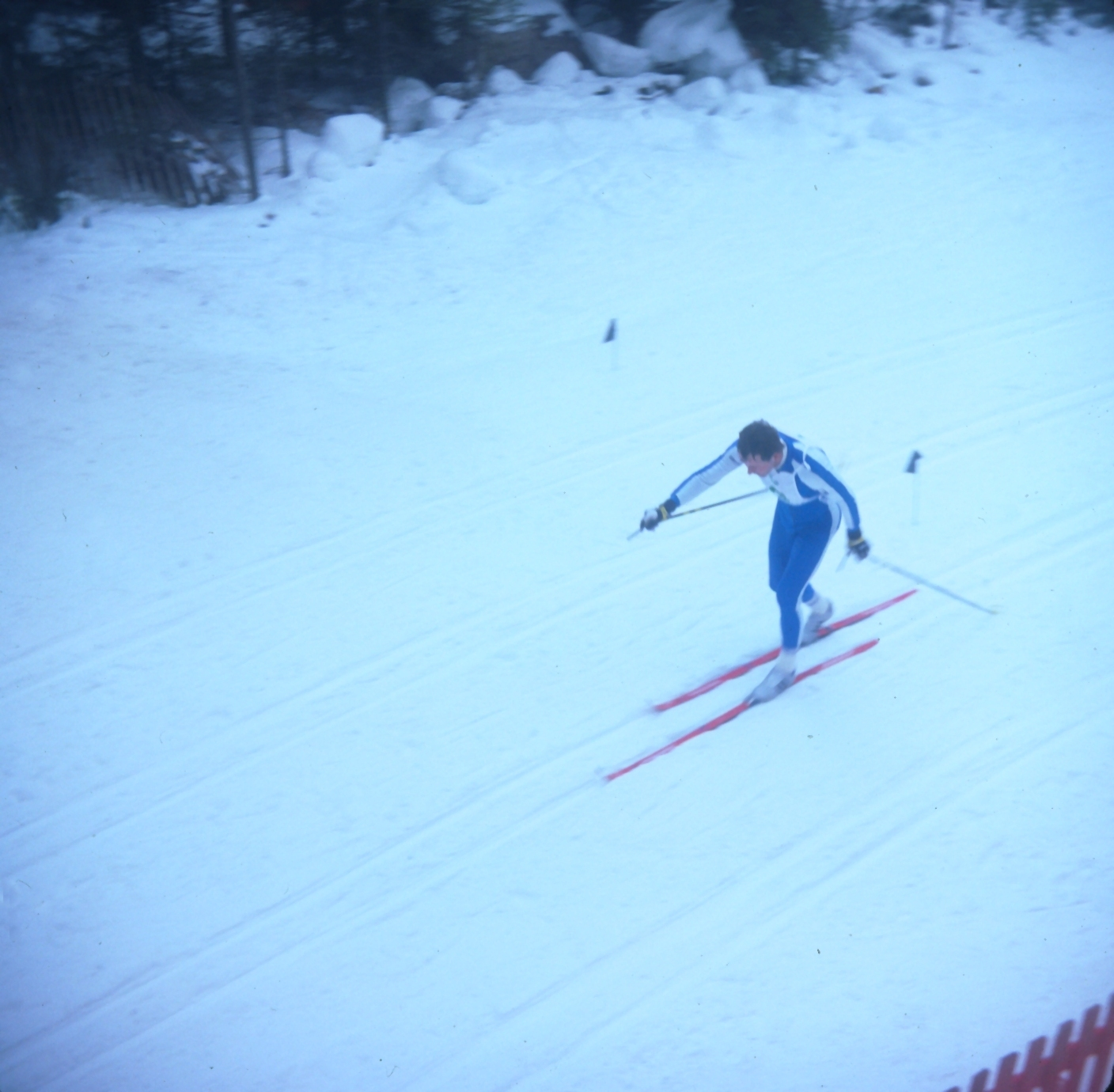
Nordic skiing at the 1980 Winter Olympics

Event	Gold	Silver	Bronze
Men's 15 km	Thomas Wassberg; Sweden	Juha Mieto; Finland	Ove Aunli; Norway
Men's 30 km	Nikolay Zimyatov; Soviet Union	Vasily Rochev; Soviet Union	Ivan Lebanov; Bulgaria
Men's 50 km	Nikolay Zimyatov; Soviet Union	Juha Mieto; Finland	Aleksandr Zavyalov; Soviet Union
Men's 4 × 10 km	Soviet Union; Vasily Rochev; Nikolay Bazhukov; Yevgeny Belyaev; Nikolay Zimyatov	Norway; Lars Erik Eriksen; Per Knut Aaland; Ove Aunli; Oddvar Brå	Finland; Harri Kirvesniemi; Pertti Teurajärvi; Matti Pitkänen; Juha Mieto
Women's 5 km	Raisa Smetanina; Soviet Union	Hilkka Riihivuori; Finland	Květoslava Jeriová; Czechoslovakia
Women's 10 km	Barbara Petzold; East Germany	Hilkka Riihivuori; Finland	Helena Takalo; Finland
Women's 4 × 5 km	East Germany; Marlies Rostock; Carola Anding; Veronika Schmidt; Barbara Petzold	Soviet Union; Nina Baldycheva; Nina Rocheva; Galina Kulakova; Raisa Smetanina	Norway; Brit Pettersen; Anette Bøe; Marit Myrmæl; Berit Aunli

== Figure skating ==
Event	Gold	Silver	Bronze
Men	Robin Cousins; Great Britain	Jan Hoffmann; East Germany	Charles Tickner; United States
Ladies	Anett Pötzsch; East Germany	Linda Fratianne; United States	Dagmar Lurz; West Germany
Pairs	Soviet Union; Irina Rodnina; Aleksandr Zaytsev	Soviet Union; Marina Cherkasova; Sergey Shakray	East Germany; Manuela Mager; Uwe Bewersdorf
Ice dancing	Soviet Union; Natalya Linichuk; Gennady Karponosov	Hungary; Krisztina Regőczy; András Sallay	Soviet Union; Irina Moiseyeva; Andrey Minenkov

== Ice Hockey ==
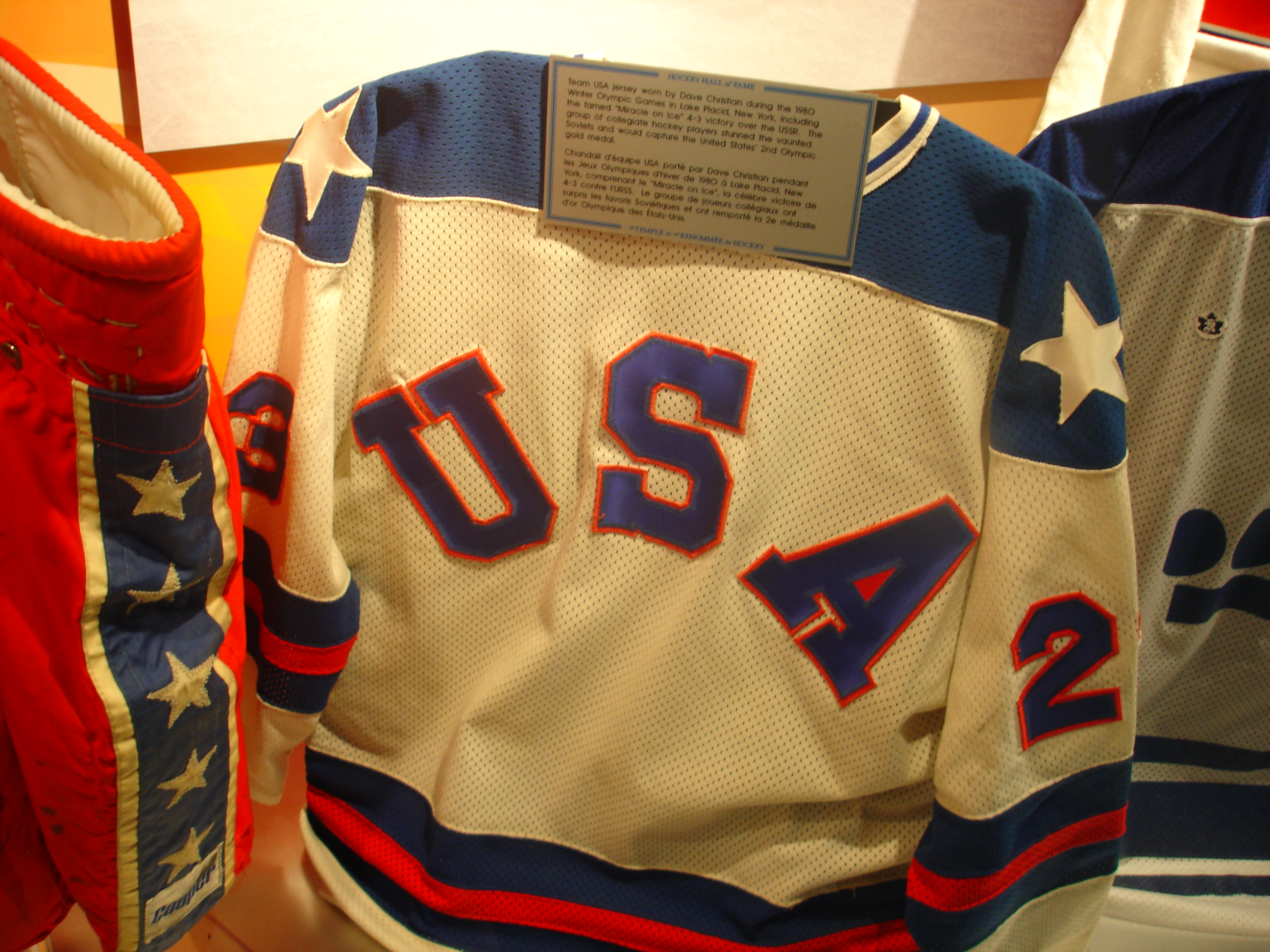
Dave Christian's jersey from the 1980 USA hockey team

Event	Gold	Silver	Bronze
Men's tournament	United States; Jim Craig; Steve Janaszak; Jack O'Callahan; Bill Baker; Ken Morrow; Mike Ramsey; Bob Suter; Dave Christian; Dave Silk; Eric Strobel; Mark Johnson; Rob McClanahan; John Harrington; Mark Pavelich; Buzz Schneider; Steve Christoff; Neal Broten; Mike Eruzione; Mark Wells; Phil Verchota	Soviet Union; Vladislav Tretiak; Vladimir Myshkin; Alexei Kasatonov; Viacheslav Fetisov; Valeri Vasiliev; Sergei Starikov; Zinetula Bilyaletdinov; Vasili Pervukhin; Boris Mikhailov; Vladimir Petrov; Valeri Kharlamov; Sergei Makarov; Vladimir Golikov; Aleksandr Golikov; Aleksandr Maltsev; Yuri Lebedev; Vladimir Krutov; Aleksandr Skvortsov; Viktor Zhluktov; Helmuts Balderis	Sweden; Pelle Lindbergh; William Löfqvist; Sture Andersson; Jan Eriksson; Thomas Eriksson; Tomas Jonsson; Tommy Samuelsson; Mats Waltin; Ulf Weinstock; Bo Berglund; Håkan Eriksson; Leif Holmgren; Bengt Lundholm; Per Lundqvist; Harald Lückner; Lars Molin; Lennart Norberg; Mats Näslund; Dan Söderström; Mats Åhlberg

== Luge ==
Event	Gold	Silver	Bronze
Men's singles	Bernhard Glass; East Germany	Paul Hildgartner; Italy	Anton Winkler; West Germany
Doubles	East Germany; Hans Rinn; Norbert Hahn	Italy; Peter Gschnitzer; Karl Brunner	Austria; Georg Fluckinger; Karl Schrott
Women's singles	Vera Zozuļa; Soviet Union	Melitta Sollmann; East Germany	Ingrīda Amantova; Soviet Union

== Nordic combined ==
Event	Gold	Silver	Bronze
Men's individual	Ulrich Wehling; East Germany	Jouko Karjalainen; Finland	Konrad Winkler; East Germany

== Ski jumping ==
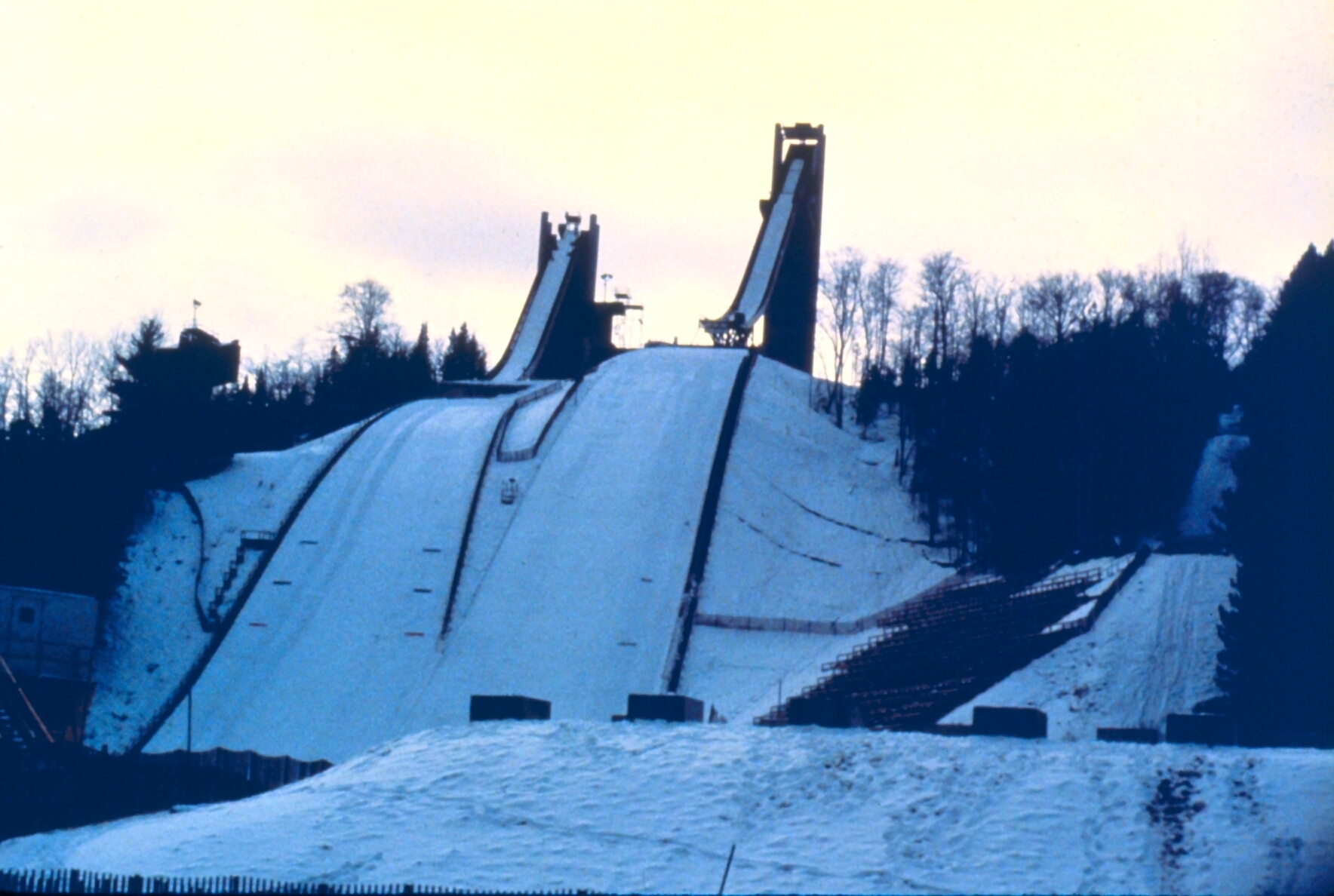
MacKenzie Intervale Ski Jumping Complex

Event	Gold	Silver	Bronze
Men's normal hill	Toni Innauer; Austria	Manfred Deckert; East Germany Hirokazu Yagi; Japan	Not awarded
Men's large hill	Jouko Törmänen; Finland	Hubert Neuper; Austria	Jari Puikkonen; Finland

== Speed skating ==
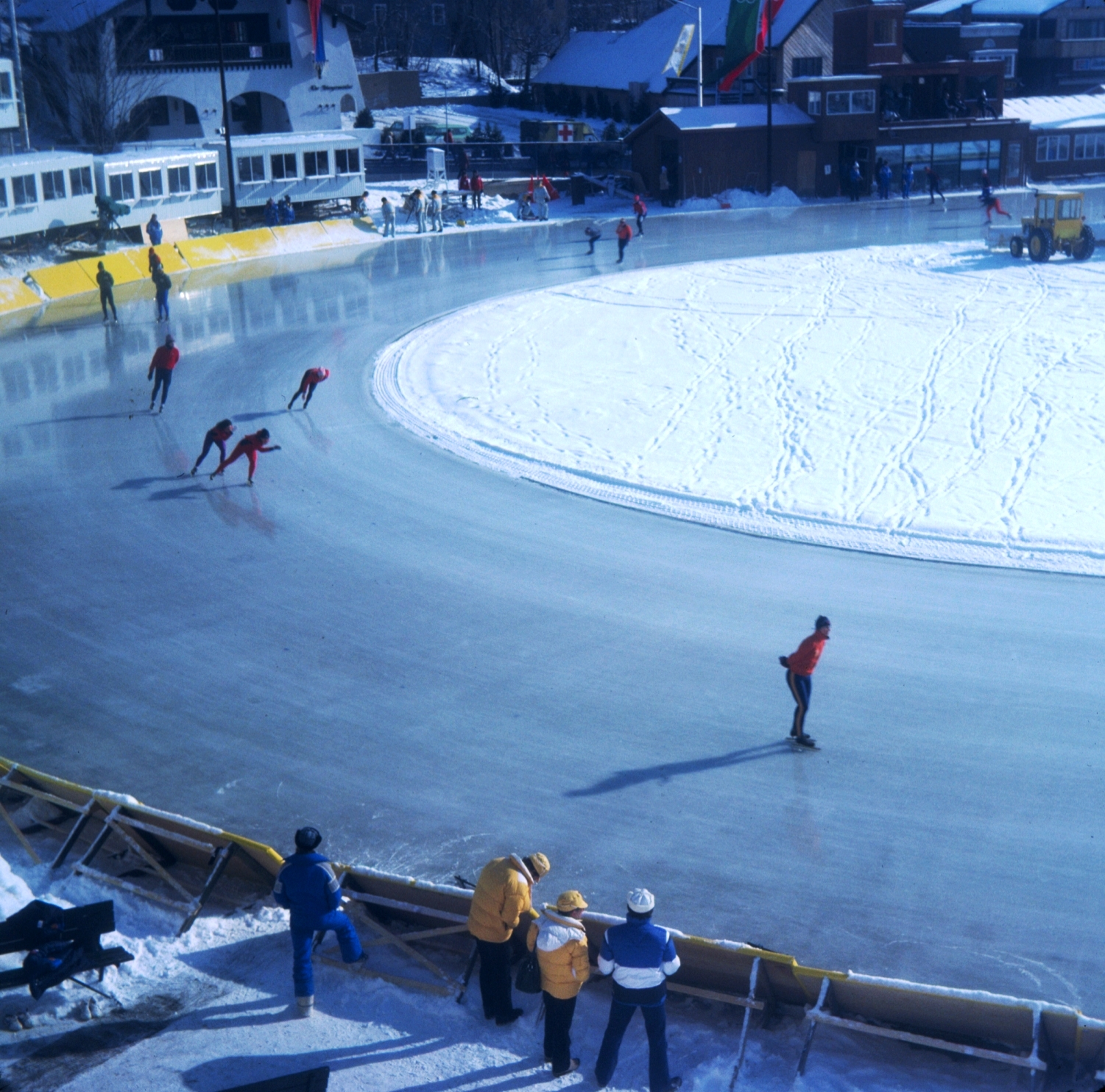
Skating at the 1980 Winter Olympics

Event	Gold	Silver	Bronze
Men's 500 metres	Eric Heiden; United States	Yevgeny Kulikov; Soviet Union	Lieuwe de Boer; Netherlands
Men's 1,000 metres	Eric Heiden; United States	Gaétan Boucher; Canada	Vladimir Lobanov; Soviet Union Frode Rønning; Norway
Men's 1,500 metres	Eric Heiden; United States	Kay Arne Stenshjemmet; Norway	Terje Andersen; Norway
Men's 5,000 metres	Eric Heiden; United States	Kay Arne Stenshjemmet; Norway	Tom Erik Oxholm; Norway
Men's 10,000 metres	Eric Heiden; United States	Piet Kleine; Netherlands	Tom Erik Oxholm; Norway
Women's 500 metres	Karin Enke-Kania; East Germany	Leah Poulos-Mueller; United States	Nataliya Petrusyova; Soviet Union
Women's 1,000 metres	Nataliya Petrusyova; Soviet Union	Leah Poulos-Mueller; United States	Sylvia Albrecht; East Germany
Women's 1,500 metres	Annie Borckink; Netherlands	Ria Visser; Netherlands	Sabine Becker; East Germany
Women's 3,000 metres	Bjørg Eva Jensen; Norway	Sabine Becker; East Germany	Beth Heiden; United States

== Medal leaders ==
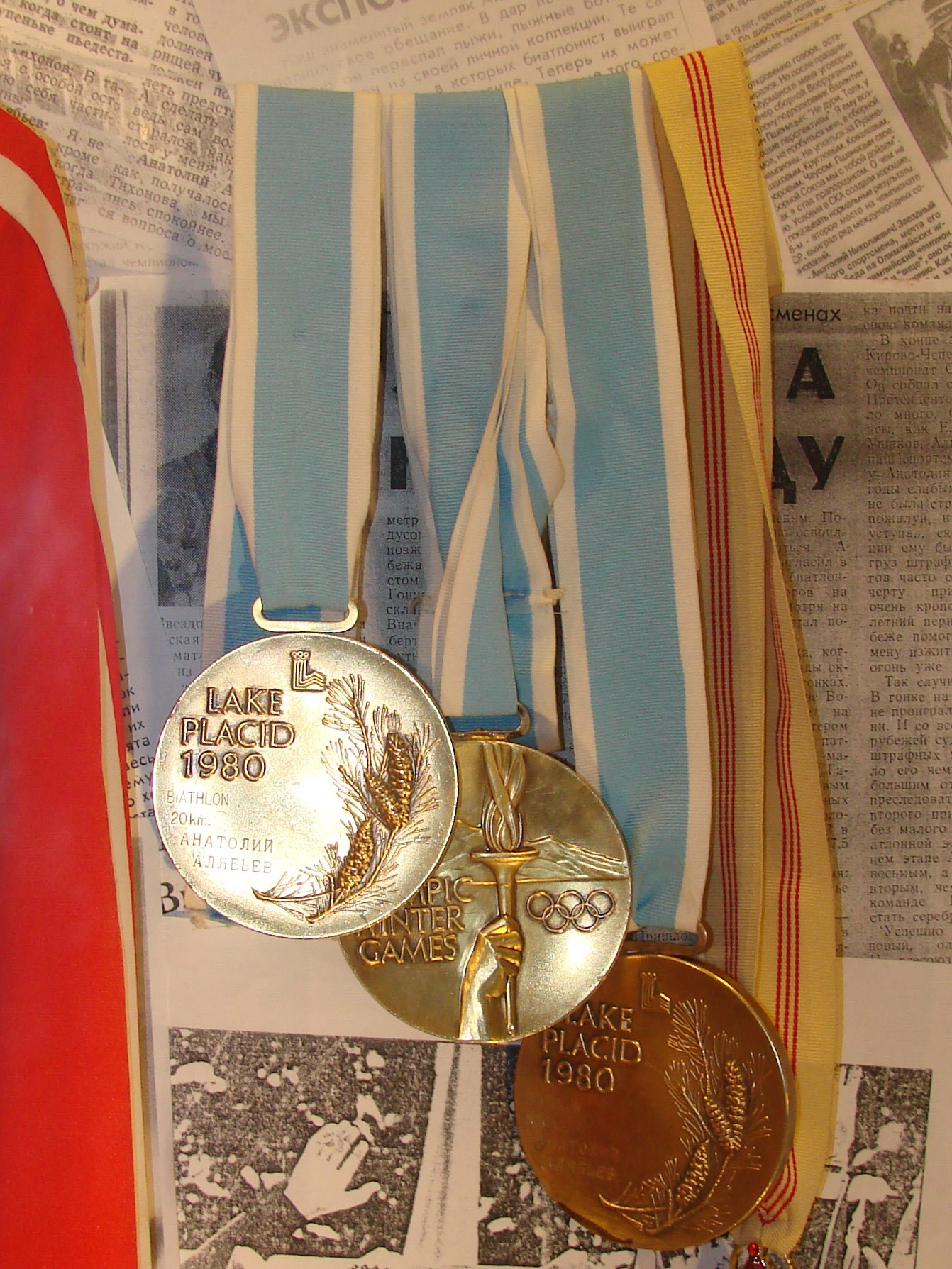
Russian biathlete Anatoly Alyabyev's three medals (two gold, one bronze) from the 1980 Winter Olympics.

Athletes that won at least two gold medals or at least three total medals are listed below.

Athlete	Nation	Sport	Gold	Silver	Bronze	Total
Eric Heiden	United States	Speed skating	5	0	0	5
Nikolay Zimyatov	Soviet Union	Cross-country skiing	3	0	0	3
Anatoly Alyabyev	Soviet Union	Biathlon	2	1	0	3
Hanni Wenzel	Liechtenstein	Alpine skiing	2	1	0	3
Frank Ullrich	East Germany	Biathlon	1	2	0	3
Juha Mieto	Finland	Cross-country skiing	0	2	1	3
Barbara Petzold	East Germany	Cross-country skiing	2	0	0	2
Ingemar Stenmark	Sweden	Alpine skiing	2	0	0	2

== See also ==
- 1980 Winter Olympics medal table
