= Poland at the 1976 Winter Olympics =

- IOC code: POL
- NOC: Polish Olympic Committee
- Website: www.pkol.pl (in Polish)

in Innsbruck
- Competitors: 56 (43 men, 13 women) in 9 sports
- Flag bearer: Wojciech Truchan
- Medals: Gold 0 Silver 0 Bronze 0 Total 0

Winter Olympics appearances (overview)
- 1924; 1928; 1932; 1936; 1948; 1952; 1956; 1960; 1964; 1968; 1972; 1976; 1980; 1984; 1988; 1992; 1994; 1998; 2002; 2006; 2010; 2014; 2018; 2022; 2026

Poland competed at the 1976 Winter Olympics in Innsbruck, Austria.

== Alpine skiing ==
Men

Athlete	Event	Race 1		Race 2		Total	
Athlete	Event	Time	Rank	Time	Rank	Time	Rank
Roman Dereziński	Downhill					1:56.33	52
Roman Dereziński	Giant Slalom	1:55.44	49	1:58.27	39	3:53.71	38
Roman Dereziński	Slalom	1:04.93	23	1:09.80	22	2:14.73	21
Jan Bachleda-Curuś	Slalom	1:03.76	20	1:05.05	6	2:08.81	11

== Biathlon ==
Men

Event	Athlete	Time	Penalties	Adjusted time ^{1}	Rank
20 km	Andrzej Rapacz	1'18:30.82	10	1'28:30.82	46
20 km	Wojciech Truchan	1'18:02.62	8	1'24:09.93	28
20 km	Jan Szpunar	1'17:27.20	4	1'21:27.20	19

^{1} One minute added per close miss (a hit in the outer ring), two minutes added per complete miss.

Men's 4 x 7.5 km relay

Athletes	Race		
Athletes	Misses ^{2}	Time	Rank
Jan Szpunar; Andrzej Rapacz; Ludwik Zięba; Wojciech Truchan	9	2'11:46.54	12

^{2} A penalty loop of 200 metres had to be skied per missed target.

== Cross-country skiing ==
Men

Event	Athlete	Race	
Event	Athlete	Time	Rank
15 km	Jan Dragon	DNF	–
15 km	Władysław Podgórski	48:18.62	44
15 km	Jan Staszel	48:04.31	40
15 km	Wiesław Gębala	46:59.00	22
30 km	Władysław Podgórski	DNF	–
30 km	Jerzy Koryciak	1'39:02.46	47
30 km	Jan Staszel	1'35:46.82	24
30 km	Wiesław Gębala	1'35:09.65	20
50 km	Wiesław Gębala	DNF	–
50 km	Jerzy Koryciak	DNF	–
50 km	Jan Staszel	DNF	–

Men's 4 × 10 km relay

Athletes	Race	
Athletes	Time	Rank
Wiesław Gębala; Jan Staszel; Jan Dragon; Władysław Podgórski	2'16:06.63	13

Women

Event	Athlete	Race	
Event	Athlete	Time	Rank
5 km	Maria Trebunia	18:21.64	36
5 km	Anna Gębala-Duraj	17:58.91	31
5 km	Anna Pawlusiak	17:29.61	25
5 km	Władysława Majerczyk	17:29.01	24
10 km	Maria Trebunia	34:14.44	33
10 km	Anna Gębala-Duraj	33:13.21	27
10 km	Anna Pawlusiak	33:01.47	26
10 km	Władysława Majerczyk	32:30.68	20

Women's 4 × 5 km relay

Athletes	Race	
Athletes	Time	Rank
Anna Pawlusiak; Anna Gębala-Duraj; Maria Trebunia; Władysława Majerczyk	1'14:13.40	8

== Figure skating ==
Women

Athlete	CF	SP	FS	Points	Places	Rank
Grazyna Dudek	20	20	17	159.48	159	18

Ice Dancing

Athletes	CD	FD	Points	Places	Rank
Teresa Weyna; Piotr Bojanczyk	9	11	182.20	90	9

== Ice hockey ==
=== First round ===
Winners (in bold) entered the Medal Round. Other teams played a consolation round for 7th-12th places.

Team 1	Score	Team 2
**Poland**	7–4	Romania

=== Medal round ===
Rank		Pld	W	L	T	GF	GA	Pts
1	Soviet Union	5	5	0	0	40	11	10
2	Czechoslovakia	5	3	2	0	17	10	6
3	West Germany	5	2	3	0	21	24	4
4	Finland	5	2	3	0	19	18	4
5	United States	5	2	3	0	15	21	4
6	Poland	5	1	4	0	9	37	2

- West Germany 7-4 Poland
- USSR 16-1 Poland
- Poland 1-0* Czechoslovakia
- USA 7-2 Poland
- Finland 7-1 Poland

* Note: The score after the Czechoslovakia vs Poland match was 7-1, but due to the positive doping test of one of the Czechoslovak players, the team was recorded a 0-1 loss. Poland didn't receive any points.

- **Team Roster**

- Walery Kosyl
- Andrzej Tkacz
- Robert Góralczyk
- Andrzej Iskrzycki
- Kordian Jajszczok
- Marek Marcińczak
- Jerzy Potz
- Andrzej Słowakiewicz
- Stefan Chowaniec
- Mieczysław Jaskierski
- Wiesław Jobczyk
- Marian Kajzerek
- Leszek Kokoszka
- Tadeusz Obłój
- Henryk Pytel
- Andrzej Zabawa
- Walenty Ziętara
- Karol Żurek

== Luge ==
Men

Athlete	Run 1		Run 2		Run 3		Run 4		Total	
Athlete	Time	Rank	Time	Rank	Time	Rank	Time	Rank	Time	Rank
Mirosław Więckowski	54.739	23	53.782	14	53.133	12	53.586	14	3:35.220	16
Andrzej Piekoszewski	54.474	21	54.166	21	53.502	18	54.117	21	3:36.259	19
Jan Kasielski	53.969	13	53.551	13	53.115	13	53.554	13	3:34.189	12

(Men's) Doubles

Athletes	Run 1		Run 2		Total	
Athletes	Time	Rank	Time	Rank	Time	Rank
Andrzej Żyła; Jan Kasielski	43.748	10	43.989	11	1:27.737	10
Mirosław Więckowski; Andrzej Kozik	44.025	13	43.977	10	1:28.002	12

Women

Athlete	Run 1		Run 2		Run 3		Run 4		Total	
Athlete	Time	Rank	Time	Rank	Time	Rank	Time	Rank	Time	Rank
Barbara Piecha	44.060	13	43.722	13	43.378	13	43.800	14	2:54.960	13
Halina Kanasz	43.967	11	45.138	18	43.499	14	43.731	13	2:56.335	14
Teresa Bugajczyk	43.621	10	43.701	12	43.157	11	43.450	12	2:53.929	12

== Nordic combined ==
Events:

- normal hill ski jumping (Three jumps, best two counted and shown here.)
- 15 km cross-country skiing

Athlete	Event	Ski Jumping				Cross-country			Total	
Athlete	Event	Distance 1	Distance 2	Points	Rank	Time	Points	Rank	Points	Rank
Stanisław Kawulok	Individual	64.0	69.0	172.8	29	DNF	–	–	DNF	–
Jan Legierski	Individual	66.0	68.0	175.7	28	49:39.05	205.38	5	291.08	18
Marek Pach	Individual	71.5	74.0	191.3	19	52:04.95	183.49	22	374.79	20
Stefan Hula	Individual	75.0	77.0	205.9	6	52:48.37	176.98	26	382.88	16

== Ski jumping ==
Athlete	Event	Jump 1		Jump 2		Total	
Athlete	Event	Distance	Points	Distance	Points	Points	Rank
Janusz Waluś	Normal hill	69.0	92.7	69.5	92.5	185.2	52
Adam Krzysztofiak	Normal hill	72.0	100.0	75.0	105.8	205.8	38
Stanisław Bobak	Normal hill	74.0	104.2	75.0	106.8	211.0	28
Tadeusz Pawlusiak	Normal hill	74.5	105.5	74.0	104.7	210.2	31
Tadeusz Pawlusiak	Large hill	75.0	74.0	67.0	56.8	130.8	52
Stanisław Bobak	Large hill	81.0	81.4	71.5	86.6	168.0	37
Janusz Waluś	Large hill	79.0	84.1	78.5	83.4	167.5	39
Marek Pach	Large hill	85.0	88.5	78.0	76.2	164.7	40

== Speed skating ==
Women

Event	Athlete	Race	
Event	Athlete	Time	Rank
500 m	Ewa Malewicka	46.67	26
500 m	Erwina Ryś-Ferens	45.37	18
500 m	Stanisława Pietruszczak	44.68	14
1000 m	Janina Korowicka	1:35.81	26
1000 m	Ewa Malewicka	1:33.89	19
1000 m	Erwina Ryś-Ferens	1:31.59	10
1500 m	Janina Korowicka	2:24.30	19
1500 m	Ewa Malewicka	2:24.26	18
1500 m	Erwina Ryś-Ferens	2:19.69	8
3000 m	Ewa Malewicka	5:08.79	25
3000 m	Janina Korowicka	4:57.48	16
3000 m	Erwina Ryś-Ferens	4:50.95	10
