= Luge at the 1976 Winter Olympics – Doubles =

Doubles at the XII Olympic Winter Games
- Venue: Olympic Sliding Centre Innsbruck
- Dates: 10 February 1976
- Competitors: 50 from 15 nations
- Winning time: 1:25.604

Medalists
1st place, gold medalist(s)		East Germany; Hans Rinn, Norbert Hahn
2nd place, silver medalist(s)		West Germany; Hans Brandner, Balthasar Schwarm
3rd place, bronze medalist(s)		Austria; Rudolf Schmid, Franz Schachner

The Doubles luge competition at the 1976 Winter Olympics in Innsbruck was held on 10 February, at Olympic Sliding Centre Innsbruck.

== Results ==
Rank	Athletes	Country	Run 1	Run 2	Total
1st place, gold medalist(s)	Hans Rinn; Norbert Hahn	East Germany	42.773	42.831	1:25.604
2nd place, silver medalist(s)	Hans Brandner; Balthasar Schwarm	West Germany	42.792	43.097	1:25.889
3rd place, bronze medalist(s)	Rudolf Schmid; Franz Schachner	Austria	42.997	42.922	1:25.919
4	Stefan Hölzlwimmer; Rudi Größwang	West Germany	43.205	43.033	1:26.238
5	Manfred Schmid; Reinhold Sulzbacher	Austria	43.035	43.389	1:26.424
6	Jindřich Zeman; Vladimír Resl	Czechoslovakia	43.315	43.511	1:26.826
7	Karl Feichter; Ernst Haspinger	Italy	43.853	43.318	1:27.171
8	Dainis Bremze; Aigars Krikis	Soviet Union	43.667	43.740	1:27.407
9	Rolands Upatnieks; Valdis Ķuzis	Soviet Union	43.732	43.850	1:27.582
10	Andrzej Żyła; Jan Kasielski	Poland	43.748	43.989	1:27.737
11	Paul Hildgartner; Walter Plaikner	Italy	43.781	44.058	1:27.839
12	Mirosław Więckowski; Andrzej Kozik	Poland	44.025	43.977	1:28.002
13	Asle Strand; Helge Svensen	Norway	44.097	44.357	1:28.454
14	Michael Gårdebäck; Nils Vinberg	Sweden	44.958	44.259	1:29.217
15	Martin Ore; Eilif Nedberg	Norway	44.744	44.534	1:29.278
16	Bernd Hahn; Ulli Hahn	East Germany	43.291	46.556	1:29.847
17	Larry Arbuthnot; Doug Hansen	Canada	44.933	45.102	1:30.035
18	Kazuaki Ichikawa; Masaaki Oyagi	Japan	45.176	45.407	1:30.583
19	Max Beck; Wolfgang Schädler	Liechtenstein	45.517	45.272	1:30.789
20	Jeremy Palmer-Tomkinson; Michel de Carvalho	Great Britain	46.400	44.977	1:31.377
21	Shieh Wei-Cheng; Huang Liu-Chong	Republic of China	45.745	45.633	1:31.378
22	David McComb; Michael Shragge	Canada	45.421	46.169	1:31.590
23	Robert Berkley, Jr. Richard Cavanaugh	United States	46.455	45.554	1:32.009
24	Jim Moriarty; John Fee	United States	46.075	45.965	1:32.040
-	Richard Liversedge; Russell Tapp	Great Britain	DNF	-	-
