= Luge at the 1976 Winter Olympics – Men's singles =

Men's singles at the XII Olympic Winter Games
- Venue: Olympic Sliding Centre Innsbruck
- Dates: 4–7 February 1976
- Competitors: 43 from 15 nations
- Winning time: 3:27.688

Medalists
1st place, gold medalist(s)		Dettlef Günther	East Germany
2nd place, silver medalist(s)		Josef Fendt	West Germany
3rd place, bronze medalist(s)		Hans Rinn	East Germany

The men's singles luge competition at the 1976 Winter Olympics in Innsbruck was held from 4 to 7 February, at Olympic Sliding Centre Innsbruck.

Silver medalist Josef Fendt served as President of the International Luge Federation (FIL) from 1994 to 2020.

== Results ==
Rank	Athlete	Country	Run 1	Run 2	Run 3	Run 4	Total
1st place, gold medalist(s)	Dettlef Günther	East Germany	52.381	52.107	51.418	51.782	3:27.688
2nd place, silver medalist(s)	Josef Fendt	West Germany	52.694	51.933	51.749	51.820	3:28.196
3rd place, bronze medalist(s)	Hans Rinn	East Germany	52.916	51.968	51.690	52.000	3:28.574
4	Hans-Heinrich Winckler	East Germany	52.848	52.328	52.069	52.209	3:29.454
5	Manfred Schmid	Austria	52.973	52.073	52.113	52.352	3:29.511
6	Anton Winkler	West Germany	52.755	52.194	52.219	52.352	3:29.520
7	Reinhold Sulzbacher	Austria	53.137	52.491	52.204	52.566	3:30.398
8	Dainis Bremze	Soviet Union	52.984	52.567	52.364	52.661	3:30.576
9	Rudolf Schmid	Austria	52.933	53.806	52.361	52.319	3:31.419
10	Vladimir Shitov	Soviet Union	53.485	53.025	52.927	53.133	3:32.570
11	Karl Brunner	Italy	53.916	53.228	53.023	53.021	3:33.188
12	Jan Kasielski	Poland	53.969	53.551	53.115	53.554	3:34.189
13	Aigars Krikis	Soviet Union	54.243	53.415	53.273	53.764	3:34.695
14	Stanislav Ptáčník	Czechoslovakia	54.450	53.810	53.207	53.371	3:34.838
15	Stefan Kjernholm	Sweden	54.382	53.495	53.502	53.611	3:34.990
16	Mirosław Więckowski	Poland	54.739	53.782	53.113	53.586	3:35.220
17	Michael Gårdebäck	Sweden	54.662	53.887	53.701	53.898	3:36.148
18	Jindřich Zeman	Czechoslovakia	54.377	53.974	53.748	54.068	3:36.167
19	Andrzej Piekoszewski	Poland	54.474	54.166	53.502	54.117	3:36.259
20	Morten Nordeide Johansen	Norway	54.460	53.899	54.155	54.365	3:36.879
21	Nils Vinberg	Sweden	54.916	54.494	54.640	54.429	3:38.479
22	Christian Strøm	Norway	55.125	54.603	54.347	54.717	3:38.792
23	Vladimír Resl	Czechoslovakia	54.109	59.068	53.418	53.640	3:40.235
24	Hidetoshi Sato	Japan	55.699	55.142	54.906	55.184	3:40.931
25	Richard Cavanaugh	United States	56.186	55.669	54.572	54.930	3:41.357
26	James Murray	United States	56.269	55.554	55.142	55.187	3:42.152
27	Kazuaki Ichikawa	Japan	56.252	55.502	55.400	55.288	3:42.442
28	Terry O'Brien	United States	56.366	55.647	55.172	55.351	3:42.536
29	Michel de Carvalho	Great Britain	56.340	55.412	55.277	55.636	3:42.665
30	Jeremy Palmer-Tomkinson	Great Britain	57.056	54.881	54.959	55.828	3:42.724
31	Larry Arbuthnot	Canada	56.691	55.380	55.085	55.628	3:42.784
32	Max Beck	Liechtenstein	56.748	55.388	55.614	57.032	3:44.782
33	Richard Liversedge	Great Britain	56.721	55.997	55.989	56.132	3:44.839
34	Shieh Wei-cheng	Republic of China	56.256	56.213	56.914	55.817	3:45.200
35	Michael Shragge	Canada	57.950	55.812	56.656	55.828	3:46.246
36	Bjørn Dyrdahl	Norway	04.969	54.185	53.911	53.979	3:47.044
37	Peter Gschnitzer	Italy	54.051	53.812	53.357	27.540	4:08.760
38	Huang Liu-chong	Republic of China	55.405	42.821	49.520	54.900	5:22.646
-	Stefan Hölzlwimmer	West Germany	52.766	52.226	52.036	DNF	-
-	Paul Hildgartner	Italy	54.300	53.400	53.800	DNF	-
-	Wolfgang Schädler	Liechtenstein	56.858	56.185	55.755	DNF	-
-	Rainer Gassner	Liechtenstein	DNF	-	-	-	-
-	Denis Michaud	Canada	DQ	-	-	-	-
