= Luge at the 1980 Winter Olympics – Men's singles =

Men's singles at the XIII Olympic Winter Games
- Venue: Mt. Van Hoevenberg Olympic Bobsled Run
- Dates: 13–16 February 1980
- Competitors: 30 from 13 nations
- Winning time: 2:54.796

Medalists
1st place, gold medalist(s)		Bernhard Glass	East Germany
2nd place, silver medalist(s)		Paul Hildgartner	Italy
3rd place, bronze medalist(s)		Anton Winkler	West Germany

The men's singles luge competition at the 1980 Winter Olympics in Lake Placid was held from 13 to 16 February, at Mt. Van Hoevenberg Olympic Bobsled Run.

== Results ==
Rank	Athlete	Country	Run 1	Run 2	Run 3	Run 4	Total
1st place, gold medalist(s)	Bernhard Glass	East Germany	43.609	43.780	43.925	43.482	2:54.796
2nd place, silver medalist(s)	Paul Hildgartner	Italy	43.652	44.000	43.708	44.012	2:55.372
3rd place, bronze medalist(s)	Anton Winkler	West Germany	43.885	44.045	44.310	44.305	2:56.545
4	Dettlef Günther	East Germany	43.199	43.555	46.879	43.530	2:57.163
5	Gerhard Sandbichler	Austria	44.128	44.711	44.305	44.307	2:57.451
6	Franz Wilhelmer	Austria	44.162	44.783	44.159	44.379	2:57.483
7	Gerhard Böhmer	West Germany	44.010	44.741	44.434	44.584	2:57.769
8	Anton Wembacher	West Germany	44.308	44.549	44.835	44.320	2:58.012
9	Albert Graf	Austria	44.253	44.524	44.815	44.431	2:58.023
10	Jindřich Zeman	Czechoslovakia	44.901	45.438	45.571	45.025	3:00.935
11	Bruce Smith	Canada	45.442	45.305	45.479	44.848	3:01.074
12	Jeff Tucker	United States	45.158	45.311	45.427	45.400	3:01.296
13	Rainer Gassner	Liechtenstein	45.283	45.956	45.907	44.927	3:02.073
14	Neil Townshend	Great Britain	46.726	45.037	45.037	45.278	3:02.078
15	John Fee	United States	45.328	45.407	46.032	45.345	3:02.112
16	Jeremy Palmer-Tomkinson	Great Britain	45.191	46.947	45.060	45.066	3:02.264
17	Mark Jensen	Canada	45.150	46.218	45.363	46.079	3:02.810
18	Stefan Kjernholm	Sweden	44.565	44.905	44.900	48.538	3:02.908
19	Koji Kuriyama	Japan	45.820	45.872	45.852	45.538	3:03.082
20	Richard Stithem	United States	45.418	45.938	46.245	45.491	3:03.092
21	Ernst Haspinger	Italy	43.435	43.833	43.592	52.556	3:03.416
22	Derek Prentice	Great Britain	45.502	45.880	46.425	46.715	3:04.522
23	Takashi Takagi	Japan	45.294	51.003	45.575	47.692	3:09.564
-	Wolfgang Schädler	Liechtenstein	45.751	48.568	DNS	-	-
-	Dainis Bremze	Soviet Union	43.559	1:21.445	DNS	-	-
-	Hans Rinn	East Germany	43.802	1:24.301	DNS	-	-
-	Vladimír Resl	Czechoslovakia	44.255	DNF	-	-	-
-	Markus Kägi	Switzerland	54.224	DNS	-	-	-
-	Karl Brunner	Italy	DNF	-	-	-	-
-	Ueli Schenkel	Switzerland	DNF	-	-	-	-
