= Kozik =

Kozik is a surname. Notable people with the surname include:

- Andrzej Kozik (born 1953), Polish luger
- Frank Kozik (1962–2023), American graphic artist
- Krzysztof Kozik (born 1978), Polish goalkeeper
- Leonid Kozik (born 1948), president of the Federation of Trade Unions of Belarus
- Yulia Kozik (born 1997), Russian basketball player
