= Shitov =

Shitov (Russian: Шитов) is a Russian male surname, its feminine counterpart is Shitova. It may refer to

- Alexandr Shitov (1913–1989), Soviet intelligence agent
- Igor Shitov (born 1986), Belarusian football player
- Vladimir Shitov (1951–2011), Soviet luger
