= Halina Biegun =

Polish luger (born 1955)

Medal record

Luge

European Championships
Bronze medal – third place	1976 Hammarstrand	Women's singles

Halina Biegun (born 11 June 1955 in Bielsko-Biała) was a Polish luger who competed during the late 1970s. She won the bronze medal in the women's singles event at the 1976 FIL European Luge Championships in Hammarstrand, Sweden. Her trainer was Józef Poraniewski.
