= Hans Winkler (disambiguation) =

Hans Winkler (1877–1945), was a German botanist.

Hans Winkler may refer to:

- Hans Günter Winkler (1926–2018), German show jumping rider
- Hans-Heinrich Winkler (born 1954), East German luger
