= Bernd Dreyer =

East German luger

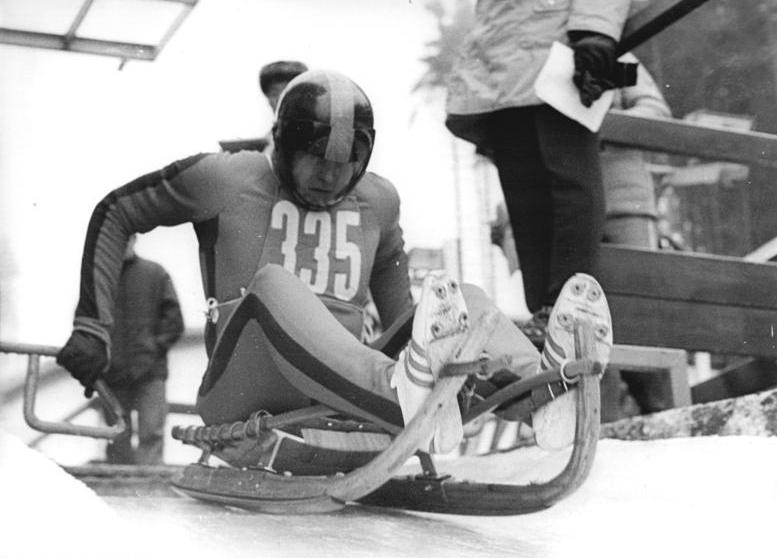
- Dreyer in 1976.
Medal record
Luge
European Championships
| Gold medal – first place | 1976 Hammarstrand | Men's doubles |

Bernd Dreyer was an East German luger who competed in the mid-1970s. He won the gold medal in the men's doubles event at the 1976 FIL European Luge Championships in Hammarstrand, Sweden.
