= Zylka =

Zylka or Žyłka is a Polish-language surname. It may refer to:

- Chris Zylka (1985), American actor and model
- Ferdinand Zylka (1998), German basketball player
- Uładzimir Žyłka (1900–1933), Belarusian poet.

== See also ==
- Żyła
