= John Fee =

John Fee may refer to:

- John Fee (politician)
- John Fee (luger)
- John Gregg Fee, American abolitionist
