= Roland Herdmann =

German luger

Medal record

Luge

European Championships
Gold medal – first place	1976 Hammarstrand	Men's doubles

Roland Herdmann was an East German luger who competed in the mid-1970s. He won the gold medal in the men's doubles event at the 1976 FIL European Luge Championships in Hammarstrand, Sweden.
