= Granath =

Granath is a Swedish surname.

== Geographical distribution ==
As of 2014, 78.4% of all known bearers of the surname Granath were residents of Sweden (frequency 1:3,974), 14.6% of the United States (1:783,625), 2.3% of Finland (1:76,344) and 1.0% of Norway (1:165,882).

In Sweden, the frequency of the surname was higher than national average (1:3,974) in the following counties:

1. Östergötland County (1:2,135)
2. Jönköping County (1:2,890)
3. Örebro County (1:3,205)
4. Dalarna County (1:3,254)
5. Stockholm County (1:3,299)
6. Västmanland County (1:3,325)
7. Värmland County (1:3,383)
8. Gävleborg County (1:3,415)
9. Södermanland County (1:3,674)
10. Västra Götaland County (1:3,734)

In Finland, the frequency of the surname was higher than national average (1:76,344) in the following regions:

1. Lapland (1:13,329)
2. Pirkanmaa (1:30,910)
3. Kymenlaakso (1:34,180)
4. Satakunta (1:35,575)
5. Uusimaa (1:64,007)

== People ==
- Björn Granath (1946–2017), Swedish actor
- Bo Granath, Swedish Grand Prix motorcycle road racer
- Einar Granath (1936–1993), Swedish ice hockey player
- Elias Granath (born 1985), Swedish ice hockey defenceman
- Oloph Granath (born 1951), Swedish speed skater
- Tiffany Granath, American actress and satellite radio personality
