= Anna Mayevskaya =

Soviet luger

Medal record

Luge

European Championships
Silver medal – second place	1978 Hammarstrand	Women's singles

Anna Mayevskaya is a Soviet luger who competed during the late 1970s. She won the silver medal in the women's singles event at the 1978 FIL European Luge Championships in Hammarstrand, Sweden.
