= Aigars Kriķis =

Latvian luger (1954–1999)

Medal record

Men's Luge

Representing Soviet Union

World Championships
Gold medal – first place	1978 Imst	Men's doubles

European Championships
Bronze medal – third place	1976 Hammarstrand	Men's doubles

Aigars Kriķis (28 August 1954 in Riga – 15 February 1999), also known as Aygars Krikis (Russian: Айгарс Крикис), was a Latvian Soviet luger who competed during the late 1970s.

== Early life and career ==
Born in Riga, Latvia. He started his career at the age of 14. Kriķis was a triple USSR Champion in Men's Doubles from 1973 to 1975. With writing at the time (usage of typewriters) his name Aigars was sometimes misspelled as Algars.

He and Dainis Bremze won the gold medal at the men's doubles event at the 1978 FIL World Luge Championships in Imst, Austria.

Kriķis and Bremze also won a bronze medal in the men's doubles event at the 1976 FIL European Luge Championships in Hammarstrand, Sweden.

At the 1976 Winter Olympics in Innsbruck, Kriķis finished thirteenth in the men's singles event and eighth in the men's doubles event with Bremze. At the 1980 Winter Olympics in Lake Placid, he finished tenth in the men's doubles event with Bremze.
