= FIL European Luge Championships 1978 =

The FIL European Luge Championships 1978 took place in Hammarstrand, Sweden for the third time after hosting the event previously in 1970 and 1976.

== Men's singles ==
Medal	Athlete	Time
Gold	Paul Hildgartner (ITA)	
Silver	Hans Rinn (GDR)	
Bronze	Vladimir Shitov (URS)	

== Women's singles ==
Medal	Athlete	Time
Gold	Elisabeth Demleitner (FRG)	
Silver	Anna Mayevskaya (URS)	
Bronze	Vera Zozula (URS)	

== Men's doubles ==
Medal	Athlete	Time
Gold	East Germany (Hans Rinn, Norbert Hahn)	
Silver	East Germany (Bernd Hahn, Ulrich Hahn)	
Bronze	Czechoslovakia (Jindrich Zeman, Vladimir Resl)	

Czechoslovakia earned their first championship medal since 1939.

== Medal table ==
Rank	Nation	Gold	Silver	Bronze	Total
1	East Germany (GDR)	1	2	0	3
2	Italy (ITA)	1	0	0	1
2	West Germany (FRG)	1	0	0	1
4	Soviet Union (URS)	0	1	2	3
5	Czechoslovakia (TCH)	0	0	1	1
Totals (5 entries)		3	3	3	9
