= Agneta Lindskog =

Swedish luger

Medal record

Luge

European Championships
Silver medal – second place	1976 Hammarstrand	Women's singles

Agneta Lindskog (born 25 April 1953) is a Swedish luger who competed during the late 1970s and early 1980s. She won the silver medal in the women's singles event at the 1976 FIL European Luge Championships in Hammarstrand, Sweden.

Lindskog also finished 13th in the women's singles event at the 1980 Winter Olympics in Lake Placid, New York.
