= Valeriy Yakushin =

Soviet luger (born 1954)

Medal record

Luge

World Championships
Silver medal – second place	1978 Imst	Men's doubles

Valeriy Yakushin (Валерий Николаевич Якушин, born 12 October 1954) is a Soviet luger who competed during the late 1970s. He won the silver medal at the men's doubles event at the 1978 FIL World Luge Championships in Imst, Austria. He also competed in the men's doubles event at the 1980 Winter Olympics.
