= Neil Townshend =

British luger

Personal information
- Nationality: British
- Born: 29 May 1955 (age 69)

Sport
- Sport: Luge

Neil Townshend (born 29 May 1955) is a British luger. He competed in the men's singles event at the 1980 Winter Olympics.

Townshend was educated at Sutton Valence School.
