= FIL World Luge Championships 1978 =

World championships in Imst, Austria

The FIL World Luge Championships 1978 took place in Imst, Austria.

== Men's singles ==
Medal	Athlete	Time
Gold	Paul Hildgartner (ITA)	
Silver	Anton Winkler (GER)	
Bronze	Manfred Schmid (AUT)	

== Women's singles ==
Medal	Athlete	Time
Gold	Vera Zozula (URS)	
Silver	Andrea Fendt (GER)	
Bronze	Angelika Schafferer (AUT)	

== Men's doubles ==
Medal	Athlete	Time
Gold	Soviet Union (Dainis Bremse, Algars Kirkis)	
Silver	Soviet Union (Valeriy Yakuzhin, Vladimir Zhitov)	
Bronze	East Germany (Hans Rinn, Norbert Hahn)	

== Medal table ==
Rank	Nation	Gold	Silver	Bronze	Total
1	Soviet Union (URS)	2	1	0	3
2	Italy (ITA)	1	0	0	1
3	West Germany (FRG)	0	2	0	2
4	Austria (AUT)	0	0	2	2
5	East Germany (GDR)	0	0	1	1
Totals (5 entries)		3	3	3	9
