= Gerhard Böhmer =

German luger (born 1958)

Personal information
- Nationality: German
- Born: 8 June 1958 (age 66); Berchtesgaden, West Germany

Sport
- Sport: Luge

Gerhard Böhmer (born 8 June 1958) is a German luger. He competed in the men's singles event at the 1980 Winter Olympics.
