= Mark Jensen (luger) =

Canadian luger (1960–2021)

Personal information
- Born: 12 October 1960; Toronto, Ontario, Canada
- Died: 1 February 2021 (aged 60)

Sport
- Sport: Luge

Mark Jensen (12 October 1960 – 1 February 2021) was a Canadian luger. He competed in the men's singles event at the 1980 Winter Olympics.
