= Richard Stithem =

American luger (born 1953)

Personal information
- Nationality: American
- Born: August 19, 1953 (age 72) Panguitch, Utah, United States

Sport
- Sport: Luge

Richard Stithem (born August 19, 1953) is an American luger. He competed in the men's singles event at the 1980 Winter Olympics.
