= Asle Strand =

Norwegian luger (1953–2000)

Medal record

Luge

European Championships
Silver medal – second place	1976 Hammarstrand	Men's doubles

Asle Strand (29 September 1953 – 9 June 2000) was a Norwegian luger who competed in the mid-1970s. He won the silver medal in the men's doubles event at the 1976 FIL European Luge Championships in Hammarstrand, Sweden.

Strand also finished 13th in the men's doubles event at the 1976 Winter Olympics in Innsbruck.

== presence ==
- 1976 Winter Olympics
- 1984 Winter Olympics

== Death ==
While recording a film of his methods in the Lyngen Alps in Troms, Norway, Strand was mortally wounded during a practice run and died several days later on 9 June 2000.
