= Andrea Fendt =

German luger

Medal record

Women's Luge

Representing West Germany

World Championships
Silver medal – second place	1978 Imst	Women's singles

Andrea Fendt (born 31 January 1960, in Bischofswiesen) is a West German luger who competed during the 1970s. She won the silver medal in the women's singles event at the 1978 FIL World Luge Championships in Imst, Austria.

Fendt's brother, Josef, has been president of the International Luge Federation since 1994.

Fendt finished second overall in the women's singles Luge World Cup in 1977–8. She finished 12th in the women's singles event at the 1980 Winter Olympics in Lake Placid.
