= Helge Svensen =

Norwegian luger (1953–2023)

Medal record

Luge

European Championships
Silver medal – second place	1976 Hammarstrand	Men's doubles

Helge Svensen (26 February 1953 – 9 December 2023) was a Norwegian luger who competed in the mid-1970s. He won the silver medal in the men's doubles event at the 1976 FIL European Luge Championships in Hammarstrand, Sweden. Svensen also finished 13th in the men's doubles event at the 1976 Winter Olympics in Innsbruck.
