= Albert Graf =

Austrian luger (born 1955)

Personal information
- Nationality: Austrian
- Born: 17 April 1955 (age 70); Steiermark, Austria

Sport
- Sport: Luge

Albert Graf (born 17 April 1955) is an Austrian luger. He competed in the men's singles event at the 1980 Winter Olympics.
