= Karl Feichter =

Italian luger (born 1954)

Personal information
- Nationality: Italian
- Born: 12 December 1954 (age 70); Welsberg-Taisten, Italy

Sport
- Sport: Luge

Karl Feichter (born 12 December 1954) is an Italian luger. He competed in the men's doubles event at the 1976 Winter Olympics.
