= Rolands Upatnieks =

Latvian luger (1932–1994)

Personal information
- Nationality: Latvian
- Born: 13 December 1932
- Died: 11 May 1994 (aged 61)

Sport
- Sport: Luge

Rolands Upatnieks (13 December 1932 – 11 May 1994) was a Latvian luger. He competed in the men's doubles event at the 1976 Winter Olympics.
