= Masaaki Oyagi =

Japanese luger (born 1948)

Personal information
- Nationality: Japanese
- Born: 5 September 1948 (age 76); Hokkaido, Japan

Sport
- Sport: Luge

Masaaki Oyagi (大八木 政明, Ōyagi Masaaki, born 5 September 1948) is a Japanese luger. He competed in the men's doubles event at the 1976 Winter Olympics.
