= Russell Tapp =

British luger

Personal information
- Nationality: British
- Born: 15 April 1943; Brisbane, Australia
- Died: 7 January 2010 (aged 66) about 65 km off the coast of Portimão, Portugal

Sport
- Sport: Luge

Russell Tapp (15 April 1943 – 7 January 2010) was a British luger. He competed in the men's doubles event at the 1976 Winter Olympics.
