= Markus Kägi =

Swiss luger (born 1960)

Personal information
- Nationality: Swiss
- Born: 8 May 1960 (age 65)

Sport
- Sport: Luge

Markus Kägi (born 8 May 1960) is a Swiss luger. He competed in the men's singles event at the 1980 Winter Olympics.
