= Valdis Ķuzis =

Latvian luger (1945–2026)

Personal information
- Nationality: Latvian
- Born: 14 April 1945 (age 81) Riga, Latvian SSR, Soviet Union

Sport
- Sport: Luge

Valdis Ķuzis (14 April 1945 – 24 April 2026) was a Latvian luger. He competed in the men's doubles event at the 1976 Winter Olympics.
