= Żyła =

Żyła (Polish pronunciation: [ˈʐɨwa]) is a Polish-language surname. It may refer to:

- Andrzej Żyła (born 1946), Polish luger
- Piotr Żyła (born 1987), Polish ski jumper
- Tomasz Żyła (born 1967), Polish bobsledder
