= Ueli Schenkel =

Swiss luger (born 1959)

Personal information
- Nationality: Swiss
- Born: 22 May 1959 (age 65)

Sport
- Sport: Luge

Ueli Schenkel (born 22 May 1959) is a Swiss luger. He competed in the men's singles event at the 1980 Winter Olympics.
