= Denis Michaud =

Canadian luger (born 1946)

Personal information
- Born: 4 October 1946 (age 78); Saint-Jérôme, Quebec, Canada

Sport
- Sport: Luge

Denis Michaud (born 4 October 1946) is a Canadian luger. He competed in the men's singles event at the 1976 Winter Olympics.
