= Bruce Smith (luger) =

Canadian luger (born 1958)

Personal information
- Born: 18 September 1958 (age 66); Toronto, Ontario, Canada

Sport
- Sport: Luge

Bruce Smith (born 18 September 1958) is a Canadian luger. He competed in the men's singles event at the 1980 Winter Olympics.
