= Dainis Bremze =

Latvian luger (born 1954)

Medal record

Men's Luge

Representing Soviet Union

World Championships
Gold medal – first place	1978 Imst	Men's doubles

European Championships
Bronze medal – third place	1976 Hammarstrand	Men's doubles

Dainis Bremze (or Bremse, born 22 July 1954 in Riga), also known as Daynis Renatovich Bremze (Russian: Дайнис Ренатович Бремзе), was a Latvian Soviet luger who competed during the late 1970s. He and Aigars Kriķis won the gold medal at the men's doubles event at the 1978 FIL World Luge Championships in Imst, Austria.

Bremze and Kriķis also won a bronze medal in the men's doubles event at the 1976 FIL European Luge Championships in Hammarstrand, Sweden.

At the 1976 Winter Olympics in Innsbruck, Bremze finished eighth in the men's singles and eight in the men's doubles event with Kriķis. At the 1980 Winter Olympics in Lake Placid, he finished tenth in the men's doubles event with Kriķis.
