= Hidetoshi Sato =

Japanese luger (born 1950)

Personal information
- Nationality: Japanese
- Born: 31 December 1950 (age 74); Tokyo, Japan

Sport
- Sport: Luge

Hidetoshi Sato (佐藤 英利, Satō Hidetoshi, born 31 December 1950) is a Japanese luger. He competed in the men's singles event at the 1976 Winter Olympics.
