= Andrzej Piekoszewski =

Polish luger (born 1950)

Personal information
- Nationality: Polish
- Born: 30 June 1950 (age 74); Szczecin, Poland

Sport
- Sport: Luge

Andrzej Piekoszewski (born 30 June 1950) is a Polish luger. He competed in the men's singles event at the 1976 Winter Olympics.
