= Vladimir Shitov =

Soviet luger

Personal information
- Born: 8 July 1952 Moscow, Russian SFSR, Soviet Union
- Died: 8 November 2011 (aged 59) Moscow, Russia

Sport
- Sport: Luge
Medal record
Representing the Soviet Union
World Championships
Silver medal – second place	1978 Imst	Doubles
European Championships
Bronze medal – third place	1978 Hammarstrand	Singles

Vladimir Sergeyevich Shitov (Russian: Владимир Сергеевич Шитов; 8 July 1952 – 8 November 2011) was a Soviet luger who competed during the late 1970s. He won the silver medal at the men's doubles event at the 1978 FIL World Luge Championships in Imst, Austria.

Shitov also won a bronze medal in the men's singles event at the 1978 FIL European Luge Championships in Hammarstrand, Sweden.
