= Martin Ore =

Norwegian luger (born 1955)

Personal information
- Born: 9 March 1955 (age 70); Oslo, Norway

Sport
- Sport: Luge

Martin Smith Ore (born 9 March 1955) is a Norwegian luger, born in Oslo. He competed at the 1976 Winter Olympics in Innsbruck, where he placed 15th in doubles together with Eilif Nedberg.
