= Per Andersson (biathlete) =

Swedish biathlete (born 1954)

Personal information
- Nationality: Swedish
- Born: 21 August 1954 (age 70); Ljusdal, Sweden

Sport
- Sport: Biathlon

Per Gunnar Andersson (born 21 August 1954) is a Swedish former biathlete. He competed in the 10 km sprint event at the 1980 Winter Olympics.
