= Krzysztof Kozik =

Polish footballer

Personal information
- Full name: Krzysztof Damian Kozik
- Date of birth: 9 January 1982 (age 44)
- Place of birth: Tychy, Poland
- Height: 1.90 m (6 ft 3 in)
- Position: Goalkeeper

Senior career*
| Years | Team | Apps | (Gls) |
| 2000 | Unia Bieruń Stary | | |
| 2001 | RKS Radomsko | | |
| 2001–2002 | KS Myszków | | |
| 2002–2003 | Aluminium Konin | 29 | (0) |
| 2003–2004 | RKS Radomsko | 33 | (0) |
| 2005–2007 | Piast Gliwice | 66 | (0) |
| 2007–2010 | GKS Bełchatów | 22 | (0) |
| 2010–2011 | Piast Gliwice | 8 | (0) |
| 2011–2012 | GKS Katowice | 0 | (0) |
| 2013–2017 | BKS Stal Bielsko-Biała | 132 | (0) |
| 2018–2019 | MRKS Czechowice-Dziedzice | 18 | (0) |
| 2020–2022 | Unia Bieruń Stary | 16 | (0) |
- * Club domestic league appearances and goals

Krzysztof Damian Kozik (born 9 January 1982) is a Polish former professional footballer who played as a goalkeeper.

== Career ==
He was released from Piast Gliwice on 1 July 2011. and then joined GKS Katowice in August 2011.

== Honours ==
MRKS Czechowice-Dziedzice

- Regional league Bielsko-Biała: 2017–18
