= Jan Staszel =

Polish cross-country skier

Medal record

Men's cross-country skiing

World Championships
| Bronze medal – third place | 1974 Falun | 30 km |

Jan Staszel (born 15 September 1950 in Dzianisz) was a Polish cross-country skier who competed during the 1970s. He won a bronze medal in the 30 km at the 1974 FIS Nordic World Ski Championships in Falun. He also competed at the 1972 Winter Olympics and the 1976 Winter Olympics.
