= Lars Molin (ice hockey) =

Swedish ice hockey player

- Born: 7 May 1956 (age 69); Örnsköldsvik, Sweden
- Height: 6 ft 0 in (183 cm)
- Weight: 176 lb (80 kg; 12 st 8 lb)
- Position: Forward
- Shot: Left
- Played for: Vancouver Canucks (NHL); Modo Hockey (SEL); Örebro HK (SEL)
- National team: Sweden
- NHL draft: Undrafted
- Playing career: 1974–1991

Lars-Erik Molin (born 7 May 1956) is a Swedish former professional ice hockey centre. He spent 3 seasons in the National Hockey League with the Vancouver Canucks between 1981 and 1984 and spent the majority of his career with Modo Hockey in the Swedish Elitserien. Many of his finest accomplishments came for Team Sweden in international play, as he helped his country to several medal finishes at both the Winter Olympics and World Championships during the 1980s.

== Playing career ==
Medal record

Men's ice hockey

Representing Sweden

Olympic Games
Bronze medal – third place	1980 Lake Placid	Ice hockey
Bronze medal – third place	1988 Calgary	Ice hockey

World Championships
Gold medal – first place	1987 Austria	Team
Silver medal – second place	1981 Sweden	Team

A skilled playmaking forward who was strong on both the powerplay and penalty kill, Molin broke into the Modo senior squad in 1974–75 at the age of 18. Over the next few seasons, he emerged as one of the club's top two-way players, culminating in his selection to play for Sweden at the 1980 Winter Olympics in Lake Placid. At the Olympics, he was one of Sweden's top players, scoring 7 points in 7 games to help the team to a bronze medal. After another strong season with Modo the following year, Molin was signed by the Vancouver Canucks in 1981 to try his luck in the NHL, joining former Modo teammates Thomas Gradin and Lars Lindgren who were already established at the club.

Fresh off representing Sweden in the 1981 Canada Cup, Molin had a strong rookie season in Vancouver in 1981–82, scoring 15 goals and 46 points in 72 games to finish 6th in club scoring. In the playoffs, he fared even better, notching 11 points in 17 games in helping the Canucks in their run to the Stanley Cup finals.

Molin continued his solid play the following year, notching 12 goals and 39 points in 58 games. However, by 1983–84, he had become a fringe member of the squad and slumped to 6 goals and 13 points in only 42 appearances.

His NHL options at an end, Molin returned to Modo for 1984–85, and turned in the highest-scoring season of his Swedish league career, posting 57 points in just 32 games. He continued his strong play with the club for the next few seasons and experienced another career highlight when he helped Sweden to a Gold Medal performance at the 1987 World Championships. He would also help Sweden to another bronze in the 1988 Winter Olympics in Calgary.

Now well into his 30s, Molin left Modo in 1988 and dropped down to the Swedish 2nd division with Örebro IK, where he spent the final 3 seasons of his career before retiring in 1991.

In 172 NHL appearances, Molin scored 33 goals and added 65 assists for 98 points. In 11 seasons in the top Swedish division with Modo, he added 142 goals and 142 assists for 284 points in 335 appearances.

Following his career, Molin moved into coaching, with stints at IF Björklöven and Timrå IK.

== Career statistics ==
=== Regular season and playoffs ===
			Regular season					Playoffs
Season	Team	League	GP	G	A	Pts	PIM	GP	G	A	Pts	PIM
1973–74	Modo AIK	SWE	4	0	0	0	0	—	—	—	—	—
1974–75	Modo AIK	SWE	5	0	0	0	0	—	—	—	—	—
1975–76	Modo AIK	SEL	33	12	7	19	22	—	—	—	—	—
1976–77	Modo AIK	SEL	36	18	11	29	20	4	1	1	2	2
1977–78	Modo AIK	SEL	36	15	10	25	24	2	1	0	1	0
1978–79	Modo AIK	SEL	36	13	16	29	18	6	3	1	4	6
1979–80	Modo AIK	SEL	36	12	8	20	34	—	—	—	—	—
1980–81	Modo AIK	SEL	30	17	13	30	30	—	—	—	—	—
1981–82	Vancouver Canucks	NHL	72	15	46	61	10	17	2	9	11	7
1982–83	Vancouver Canucks	NHL	58	12	27	39	23	—	—	—	—	—
1983–84	Vancouver Canucks	NHL	42	6	7	13	4	2	0	0	0	0
1984–85	Modo AIK	SWE II	32	31	26	57	22	—	—	—	—	—
1985–86	Modo AIK	SEL	34	19	19	38	24	—	—	—	—	—
1986–87	Modo AIK	SEL	34	8	16	24	42	—	—	—	—	—
1987–88	Modo AIK	SEL	24	7	7	14	54	4	1	0	1	2
1988–89	Örebro IK	SWE II	33	11	21	32	68	10	3	7	10	2
1989–90	Örebro IK	SWE II	30	23	42	65	30	6	2	6	8	4
1990–91	Örebro IK	SWE II	30	16	24	40	28	2	0	0	0	2
SEL totals			299	121	107	228	268	16	6	2	8	10
NHL totals			172	33	80	113	37	19	2	9	11	7
SWE II totals			125	71	123	194	148	18	5	13	18	8

=== International ===
Year	Team	Event	GP	G	A	Pts	PIM
1976	Sweden	WJC	4	2	0	2	2
1980	Sweden	OG	7	2	5	7	2
1981	Sweden	WC	8	2	3	5	4
1981	Sweden	CC	5	2	2	4	0
1985	Sweden	WC	5	1	2	3	2
1987	Sweden	WC	9	1	1	2	8
1988	Sweden	OG	7	0	2	2	2
Senior totals			41	8	15	23	18
