= Ewa Malewicka =

Polish speed skater

Personal information
- Nationality: Polish
- Born: 8 May 1955 Elbląg, Poland
- Died: 23 July 1995 (aged 40) Radziechowy, Poland

Sport
- Sport: Speed skating

Ewa Malewicka (8 May 1955 – 23 July 1995) was a Polish speed skater. She competed in four events at the 1976 Winter Olympics.
