= Ronnie Adolfsson =

Swedish biathlete (born 1956)

Personal information
- Full name: Åke Ronnie Adolfsson
- Nationality: Swedish
- Born: 25 March 1956 (age 69); Hãljes, Sweden
- Height: 1.80 m (5 ft 11 in)
- Weight: 77 kg (170 lb)

Sport
- Sport: Biathlon

Åke Ronnie Adolfsson (born 25 March 1956) is a Swedish biathlete. He competed in the 1980 and 1984 Winter Olympics.
