= Jan Dragon =

Polish cross-country skier

Personal information
- Nationality: Polish
- Born: 9 June 1956 (age 68); Istebna, Poland

Sport
- Sport: Cross-country skiing

Jan Dragon (born 9 June 1956) is a Polish cross-country skier. He competed in the men's 15 kilometre event at the 1976 Winter Olympics.
