= Marek Pach =

Polish skier and ski jumper

Marek Pach (born 16 December 1954) is a Polish former Nordic combined skier and ski jumper who competed in the 1976 Winter Olympics.
