= Hans-Heinrich Winkler =

East German luger

Medal record

Luge
Bronze medal – third place	1976 Hammarstrand	Men's singles

Hans-Heinrich Winkler (sometimes listed as Hans-Heinrich Wickler) was an East German luger who competed in the mid-1970s. He won the bronze medal in the men's singles event at the 1976 FIL European Luge Championships in Hammarstrand, Sweden.

Winkler also finished fourth in the men's singles event at the 1976 Winter Olympics in Innsbruck though his surname was misspelled as Wickler.
