= Wiesław Gębala =

Polish cross-country skier

Personal information
- Nationality: Polish
- Born: 14 September 1950 (age 74); Bielsko-Biała, Poland

Sport
- Sport: Cross-country skiing

Wiesław Gębala (born 14 September 1950) is a Polish cross-country skier. He competed in the men's 15 kilometre event at the 1976 Winter Olympics.
