= Morten Nordeide Johansen =

Norwegian luger (born 1951)

Personal information
- Born: 26 September 1951 (age 73); Oslo, Norway

Sport
- Sport: Luge

Morten Nordeide Johansen (born 26 September 1951) is a Norwegian luger, born in Oslo. He competed at the 1976 Winter Olympics in Innsbruck, where he placed 20th in singles.
