= Eilif Nedberg =

Norwegian luger (born 1956)

Personal information
- Born: 7 September 1956 (age 68); Oslo, Norway

Sport
- Sport: Luge

Eilif Bjarne Nedberg (born 7 September 1956) is a Norwegian luger, born in Oslo. He competed at the 1976 Winter Olympics in Innsbruck, where he placed 15th in doubles together with Martin Ore.
