= Jerzy Koryciak =

Polish cross-country skier

Personal information
- Nationality: Polish
- Born: 7 March 1954 (age 71); Zwardoń, Poland

Sport
- Sport: Cross-country skiing

Jerzy Koryciak (born 7 March 1954) is a Polish cross-country skier. He competed in the men's 30 kilometre event at the 1976 Winter Olympics.
