= Dan Söderström =

Swedish ice hockey player

- Born: 5 April 1948 (age 78) Avesta, Sweden
- Height: 5 ft 8 in (173 cm)
- Weight: 163 lb (74 kg; 11 st 9 lb)
- Position: Right wing
- Shot: Left
- Played for: Leksands IF
- National team: Sweden
- Playing career: 1966–1983

Dan Söderström (born 5 April 1948) is a Swedish retired professional ice hockey player who played in the Elitserien. He played for Leksands IF. He won a bronze medal at the 1980 Winter Olympics.

== Career statistics ==
			Regular season					Playoffs
Season	Team	League	GP	G	A	Pts	PIM	GP	G	A	Pts	PIM
1962–63	Horndals IF	Juniorserien	—	—	—	—	—	—	—	—	—	—
1963–64	Horndals IF	Division 3	18	12	—	—	—	—	—	—	—	—
1964–65	Horndals IF	Division 3	18	15	—	—	—	—	—	—	—	—
1965–66	Horndals IF	Division 3	18	24	—	—	—	—	—	—	—	—
1966–67	Leksands IF	Division 1	18	6	2	8	2	2	0	0	0	0
1967–68	Leksands IF	Division 1	21	13	7	20	10	7	1	0	1	6
1968–69	Leksands IF	Division 1	21	17	5	22	4	7	3	2	5	2
1969–70	Leksands IF	Division 1	26	15	15	30	6	14	10	4	14	6
1970–71	Leksands IF	Division 1	28	12	19	31	6	14	5	9	14	2
1971–72	Leksands IF	Division 1	25	15	9	24	20	11	5	4	9	16
1972–73	Leksands IF	Division 1	28	20	15	35	18	14	8	8	16	12
1973–74	Leksands IF	Division 1	32	23	20	43	14	18	11	10	21	6
1974–75	Leksands IF	Division 1	29	24	33	57	2	5	2	0	2	0
1975–76	Leksands IF	Elitserien	35	24	23	47	16	4	0	3	3	0
1976–77	Leksands IF	Elitserien	35	18	29	47	9	5	0	0	0	6
1977–78	Leksands IF	Elitserien	30	11	32	43	19	—	—	—	—	—
1978–79	Leksands IF	Elitserien	9	1	2	3	9	1	0	0	0	0
1979–80	Leksands IF	Elitserien	36	18	13	31	24	2	0	2	2	2
1980–81	Leksands IF	Elitserien	35	10	20	30	18	—	—	—	—	—
1981–82	Leksands IF	Elitserien	36	11	18	29	26	—	—	—	—	—
1982–83	Leksands IF	Elitserien	32	2	19	21	10	—	—	—	—	—
Elitserien totals			248	95	156	251	131	12	0	5	5	8
Division 1 totals			228	145	125	270	82	92	45	37	82	50
