= Roman Dereziński =

Polish alpine skier (born 1951)

Roman Dereziński (born 30 December 1951 in Zakopane) is a Polish former alpine skier who competed in the 1976 Winter Olympics.
