= FIL European Luge Championships 1976 =

The FIL European Luge Championships 1976 took place in Hammarstrand, Sweden for the second time after previously hosted the championships in 1970. A record five countries won medals at these championships, breaking the previous record set in 1971 that was equalled in 1974.

== Men's singles ==
Medal	Athlete	Time
Gold	Wolfram Fiedler (GDR)	
Silver	Michael Gärdebäck (SWE)	
Bronze	Hans-Heinrich Winkler (GDR)	

== Women's singles ==
Medal	Athlete	Time
Gold	Vera Zozula (URS)	
Silver	Agneta Lindskog (SWE)	
Bronze	Halina Biegun (POL)	

Zozula is the first Soviet to win at the European championships.

== Men's doubles ==
Medal	Athlete	Time
Gold	East Germany (Bernd Dreyer, Roland Herdmann)	
Silver	Norway (Asle Strand, Helge Svensen)	
Bronze	Soviet Union (Dainis Bremse, Algars Kirkis)	

Norway earned its first medal at the championships since 1937.

== Medal table ==
Rank	Nation	Gold	Silver	Bronze	Total
1	East Germany (GDR)	2	0	1	3
2	Soviet Union (URS)	1	0	1	2
3	Sweden (SWE)	0	2	0	2
4	Norway (NOR)	0	1	0	1
5	Poland (POL)	0	0	1	1
Totals (5 entries)		3	3	3	9
