= Michael Gärdebäck =

Swedish luger (born 1956)

Medal record

Men's luge

Representing Sweden

European Championships
Silver medal – second place	1976 Hammarstrand	Men's singles

Erik Michael Gärdebäck (born 22 March 1956) was a Swedish luger who competed in the mid-1970s. He won the silver medal in the men's singles event at the 1976 FIL European Luge Championships in Hammarstrand, Sweden. He also competed at the 1976 Winter Olympics.

As of 2007, Gärdebäck lives in Nacka and is secretary of the luge club in Saltsjöbadens.
