= Jan Kasielski =

Polish luger (born 1954)

Personal information
- Nationality: Polish
- Born: 14 November 1954 (age 70); Karpacz, Poland

Sport
- Sport: Luge

Jan Kasielski (born 14 November 1954) is a Polish luger. He competed in the men's singles and doubles events at the 1976 Winter Olympics.
