= Sören Wikström =

Swedish biathlete (born 1960)

Personal information
- Nationality: Swedish
- Born: 29 September 1960 (age 64); Malung, Sweden

Sport
- Sport: Biathlon

Sören Wikström (born 29 September 1960) is a Swedish biathlete. He competed in the 20 km individual event at the 1980 Winter Olympics.
