= Bo Berglund =

Swedish ice hockey player

- Born: 6 April 1955 (age 71) Örnsköldsvik, Sweden
- Height: 5 ft 10 in (178 cm)
- Weight: 175 lb (79 kg; 12 st 7 lb)
- Position: Right wing
- Shot: Left
- Played for: Modo AIK; Djurgårdens IF; Quebec Nordiques; Minnesota North Stars; Philadelphia Flyers; AIK
- National team: Sweden
- NHL draft: 140th overall, 1975; Boston Bruins; 232nd overall, 1983; Quebec Nordiques
- Playing career: 1973–1990

Bo Berglund (born 6 April 1955) is a Swedish former professional ice hockey player. After his active career he has also worked as an ice hockey color commentator for Sweden's TV4 Sweden.

== Playing career ==
After having played for Modo Hockey and Djurgårdens IF in Sweden, he left for North America in 1983, joining the Quebec Nordiques. He has also played for the Minnesota North Stars and the Philadelphia Flyers, as well as with the minors. After a total of 130 games in the NHL, he returned home to Sweden in 1986 to play for AIK, where he played until he retired in 1990. He was a scout for the Buffalo Sabres through the 2015 season. He was awarded the Golden Puck Award following the 1987–1988 season.

== Career statistics ==
=== Regular season and playoffs ===
			Regular season					Playoffs
Season	Team	League	GP	G	A	Pts	PIM	GP	G	A	Pts	PIM
1973–74	Modo AIK	SWE Jr	14	6	4	10	12	14	5	6	11	14
1974–75	Modo AIK	SWE	26	15	17	32	16	2	2	2	4	14
1975–76	Modo AIK	SEL	35	16	19	35	43	—	—	—	—	—
1976–77	Modo AIK	SEL	33	17	21	38	30	4	3	2	5	0
1977–78	Djurgårdens IF	SEL	15	7	5	12	6	—	—	—	—	—
1978–79	Djurgårdens IF	SEL	36	23	13	36	46	6	2	3	5	14
1979–80	Djurgårdens IF	SEL	36	20	17	37	50	—	—	—	—	—
1980–81	Djurgårdens IF	SEL	31	13	9	22	64	—	—	—	—	—
1981–82	Djurgårdens IF	SEL	34	16	36	52	58	—	—	—	—	—
1982–83	Djurgårdens IF	SEL	32	19	13	32	66	8	5	1	6	8
1983–84	Quebec Nordiques	NHL	75	16	27	43	20	7	2	0	2	4
1984–85	Quebec Nordiques	NHL	12	4	1	5	6	—	—	—	—	—
1984–85	Minnesota North Stars	NHL	33	6	9	15	8	2	0	0	0	2
1984–85	Springfield Indians	AHL	3	1	2	3	0	—	—	—	—	—
1985–86	Minnesota North Stars	NHL	3	2	0	2	2	—	—	—	—	—
1985–86	Springfield Indians	AHL	3	0	1	1	2	—	—	—	—	—
1985–86	Philadelphia Flyers	NHL	7	0	2	2	4	—	—	—	—	—
1985–86	Hershey Bears	AHL	43	17	28	45	40	16	7	10	17	17
1986–87	AIK	SWE II	28	26	24	50	36	—	—	—	—	—
1987–88	AIK	SEL	39	25	31	56	44	5	3	4	7	4
1988–89	AIK	SEL	33	11	17	28	42	1	0	0	0	0
1989–90	AIK	SEL	24	5	11	16	20	—	—	—	—	—
SEL totals			348	172	192	364	469	24	13	10	23	24
NHL totals			130	28	39	67	40	9	2	0	2	6

=== International ===
Medal record

Representing Sweden

Ice hockey

European Junior Championships
Gold medal – first place	1974 Switzerland	

Olympic Games
Bronze medal – third place	1980 Lake Placid	
Bronze medal – third place	1988 Calgary	

Year	Team	Event	GP	G	A	Pts	PIM
1974	Sweden	EJC	5	3	6	9	4
1974	Sweden	WJC	5	1	4	5	0
1980	Sweden	OLY	7	1	3	4	4
1988	Sweden	OLY	8	4	4	8	4
1989	Sweden	WC	9	4	0	4	4
Junior totals			10	4	10	14	4
Senior totals			24	9	7	16	12

Preceded by Håkan Södergren	Guldpucken; 1988	Succeeded by Kent Nilsson
