= Władysław Podgórski =

Polish cross-country skier

Personal information
- Nationality: Polish
- Born: 12 July 1956 Rytro, Poland
- Died: 9 May 1976 (aged 19) Nowy Sącz, Poland

Sport
- Sport: Cross-country skiing

Władysław Podgórski (12 July 1956 – 9 May 1976) was a Polish cross-country skier. He competed in the men's 15 kilometre event at the 1976 Winter Olympics.
