= Wojciech Truchan =

Polish biathlete (born 1948)

Personal information
- Nationality: Polish
- Born: 15 April 1948 (age 76); Dzianisz, Poland

Sport
- Sport: Biathlon

Wojciech Truchan (born 15 April 1948) is a Polish biathlete. He competed in the 20 km individual event at the 1976 Winter Olympics.
