= Bengt Lundholm =

Swedish ice hockey player

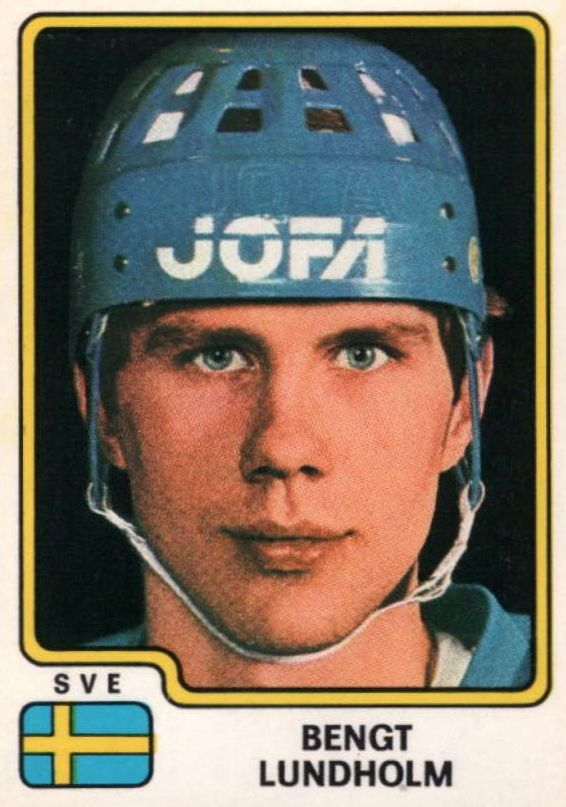
- Born: 4 August 1955 (age 71) Falun, Sweden
- Height: 6 ft 0 in (183 cm)
- Weight: 180 lb (82 kg; 12 st 12 lb)
- Position: Left wing
- Shot: Left
- Played for: Leksands IF; AIK; Winnipeg Jets
- National team: Sweden
- NHL draft: Undrafted
- WHA draft: 166th overall, 1975; Winnipeg Jets
- Playing career: 1975–1987

Bengt Lundholm
Medal record

Representing Sweden

Men's ice hockey

Olympic Games
Bronze medal – third place	1980 Lake Placid	

World Championships
Silver medal – second place	1977 Austria	
Bronze medal – third place	1976 Poland	
Bronze medal – third place	1979 Soviet Union	

World Junior Championships
Bronze medal – third place	1975 Canada/United States	

European Junior Championships
Gold medal – first place	1974 Switzerland	
Silver medal – second place	1976 Poland	

Bengt Johan Lundholm (born 4 August 1955) is a retired Swedish professional ice hockey player who played 275 games in the National Hockey League for the Winnipeg Jets between 1981 and 1986.

Lundholm was originally drafted by the Winnipeg Jets in the 1975 WHA Amateur Draft, 166th overall. Before moving to North America, Lundholm played in his native Sweden and suited up for Leksands IF and AIK IF. Lundholm joined the Jets (now playing in the National Hockey League) in 1981 and over five seasons and 275 regular season games, he scored 48 goals and 95 assists for 143 points. He returned to AIK for one more season before retiring in 1987. Internationally Lundholm played for Sweden at several tournaments, winning one silver and two bronze at the World Championships, and a bronze at the 1980 Winter Olympics.

== Career statistics ==
=== Regular season and playoffs ===
			Regular season					Playoffs
Season	Team	League	GP	G	A	Pts	PIM	GP	G	A	Pts	PIM
1969–70	Falu IF U20	SWE-Jr	—	—	—	—	—	—	—	—	—	—
1970–71	Falu IF U20	SWE-Jr	—	—	—	—	—	—	—	—	—	—
1971–72	Falu IF	SWE-2	11	2	—	2	—	—	—	—	—	—
1972–73	Falu IF	SWE-2	16	11	—	—	—	—	—	—	—	—
1973–74	Leksands IF	SWE	9	1	0	1	4	—	—	—	—	—
1974–75	Leksands IF	SWE	18	4	7	11	6	—	—	—	—	—
1975–76	Leksands IF	SWE	36	15	22	37	23	4	3	4	7	2
1976–77	Leksands IF	SWE	34	8	23	31	28	5	4	3	7	16
1977–78	AIK	SWE	36	16	14	30	22	6	1	4	5	4
1978–79	AIK	SWE	34	11	9	20	24	—	—	—	—	—
1979–80	AIK	SWE	35	16	16	32	32	—	—	—	—	—
1980–81	AIK	SWE	24	6	7	13	40	5	1	0	1	2
1981–82	Winnipeg Jets	NHL	66	14	30	44	10	4	1	1	2	2
1982–83	Winnipeg Jets	NHL	58	14	28	42	16	3	0	1	1	2
1983–84	Winnipeg Jets	NHL	57	5	14	19	20	—	—	—	—	—
1984–85	Winnipeg Jets	NHL	78	12	18	30	20	5	2	2	4	8
1985–86	Winnipeg Jets	NHL	16	3	5	8	6	2	0	0	0	2
1985–86	AIK	SWE	13	1	1	2	4	—	—	—	—	—
1986–87	AiK	SWE-2	26	12	14	26	16	—	—	—	—	—
SWE totals			239	78	99	177	183	20	9	11	20	24
NHL totals			275	48	95	143	72	14	3	4	7	14

=== International ===
Year	Team	Event	GP	G	A	Pts	PIM
1974	Sweden	EJC	5	6	2	8	4
1974	Sweden	WJC	3	0	1	1	0
1975	Sweden	WJC	5	1	3	4	0
1976	Sweden	WC	10	0	2	2	6
1977	Sweden	WC	8	5	4	9	4
1978	Sweden	WC	10	5	3	8	4
1979	Sweden	WC	7	1	3	4	4
1980	Sweden	OLY	6	1	0	1	2
1981	Sweden	CC	5	1	0	1	2
Junior totals			13	7	6	13	4
Senior totals			46	13	12	25	22
