= Jan-Åke Carlberg =

Swedish speed skater

Personal information
- Nationality: Swedish
- Born: 21 December 1957 (age 68) Stockholm, Sweden

Sport
- Sport: Speed skating

Jan-Åke Carlberg (born 21 December 1957) is a Swedish speed skater. He competed at the 1980 Winter Olympics and the 1984 Winter Olympics.
