= Leif Holmgren =

Swedish ice hockey player

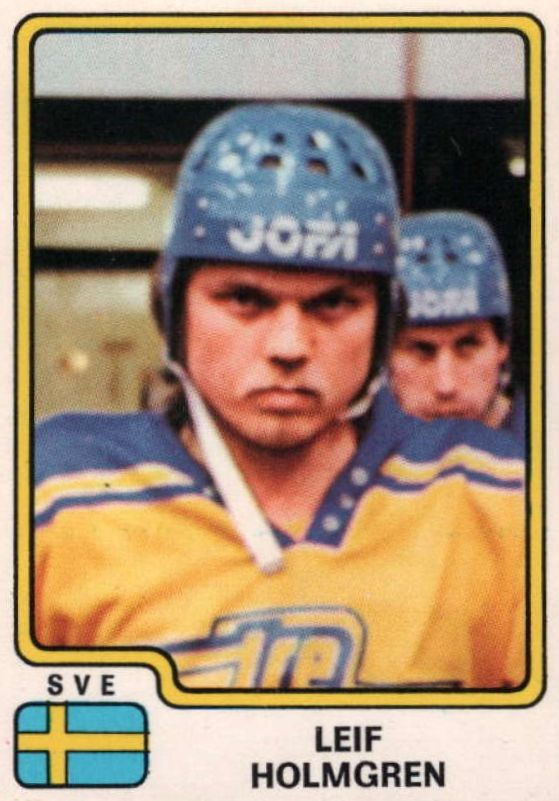
- Born: 25 May 1953 (age 73) Kiruna, Sweden
- Height: 5 ft 9 in (175 cm)
- Weight: 172 lb (78 kg; 12 st 4 lb)
- Position: Centre
- Shot: Left
- Played for: AIK; Vallentuna BK
- National team: Sweden
- Playing career: 1971–1986

Olympic medal record

Men's Ice hockey

Representing Sweden
Bronze medal – third place	1980 Lake Placid	Team competition

Leif Martin Holmgren (born 25 May 1953) is a Swedish former ice hockey player.

== Playing career ==
Holmgren spent the majority of his career, which began in 1971, with AIK. His best season came in 1977–78, scoring 21 goals and 31 points in 32 games. He was then named into the Swedish All-Star Team in 1979, having contributed 18 assists as well as scoring 11 goals for 29 points. As a member of AIK, Holmgren won the Elitserien playoff championship in 1982 and 1984 as well as the regular season championship also in 1984. Afterwards, Holmgren moved to the Allsvenskan and signed with Vallentuna BK where he scored 32 points with 17 goals to his credit. He then return to AIK for one last season before retiring in 1986.

== International play ==
Holmgren played in three Ice Hockey World Championships for Sweden, winning a bronze medal in 1979. He also won a bronze medal at the 1980 Winter Olympics.
