= Ulf Weinstock =

Swedish ice hockey player

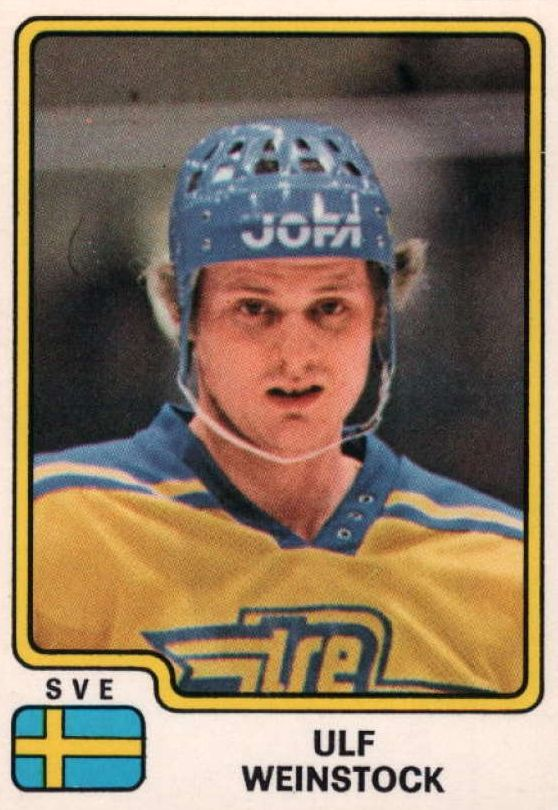
- Weinstock in 1979
- Born: 10 August 1952 (age 73) Strängnäs, Sweden
- Played for: Leksands IF (SEL)
- National team: Sweden

Ulf Weinstock
Medal record

Representing Sweden

Men's Ice Hockey
Bronze medal – third place	1980 Lake Placid	Team

Ulf Weinstock (born 10 August 1952) is a Swedish former ice hockey player who played for the Swedish national team. He won a bronze medal at the 1980 Winter Olympics. He played for Leksands from 1970 until 1984 and for Stjernen in Norway from 1984 to 1987.
