= Andrzej Żyła =

Polish luger (born 1946)

Personal information
- Nationality: Polish
- Born: 24 November 1946 (age 78); Miłków, Poland

Sport
- Sport: Luge

Andrzej Żyła (born 24 November 1946) is a Polish luger. He competed in the men's doubles event at the 1976 Winter Olympics.
