= Jindřich Zeman =

Czech luger (born 1950)

Medal record

Luge

European Championships
Bronze medal – third place	1978 Hammarstrand	Men's doubles

Jindřich Zeman (born 30 September 1950) was a Czech luger. He competed for Czechoslovakia in the late 1970s and early 1980s. He won the bronze medal in the men's doubles event at the 1978 FIL European Luge Championships in Hammarstrand, Sweden.

Zeman also finished eighth in the men's doubles event at the 1980 Winter Olympics in Lake Placid, New York.

As of 2008, he was a coach of the Czech national team.
