= Sture Andersson =

Swedish ice hockey player

Medal record

Representing Sweden

Men's Ice Hockey
Bronze medal – third place	1980 Lake Placid	Team

Carl Sture Mikael Andersson (born 18 November 1949) is an ice hockey player who played for the Swedish national team. He won a bronze medal at the 1980 Winter Olympics.
