= Andrzej Kozik =

Polish luger (born 1953)

Personal information
- Nationality: Polish
- Born: 20 December 1953 (age 71); Leśna, Poland

Sport
- Sport: Luge

Andrzej Kozik (born 20 December 1953) is a Polish luger. He competed in the men's doubles event at the 1976 Winter Olympics.
