= Per Lundqvist =

Swedish ice hockey player

Medal record

Representing Sweden

Men's Ice Hockey
Bronze medal – third place	1980 Lake Placid	Team

Per Erik Anders Lunqvist (born 24 January 1951) is an ice hockey player who played for the Swedish national team. He won a bronze medal at the 1980 Winter Olympics.
