= Oloph Granath =

Swedish speed skater

Karl Oloph Granath (born 17 October 1951) is a former speed skater from Sweden, who represented his native country at the 1980 Winter Olympics in Lake Placid, United States. He also competed at the 1976 Winter Olympics.
