= Jan Eriksson (ice hockey) =

Swedish former ice hockey defenceman

- Born: 14 January 1958 (age 68) Sollefteå, Sweden
- Height: 1.78 m (5 ft 10 in)
- Weight: 78 kg (172 lb; 12 st 4 lb)
- Position: Defence
- Shot: Left
- Played for: MODO Hockey; AIK; VIK Västerås HK
- National team: Sweden
- Playing career: 1976–1990

Olympic medal record

Men's Ice hockey

Representing Sweden
Bronze medal – third place	1980 Lake Placid	Team competition

Jan Holger Eriksson (born 14 January 1958) is a Swedish former ice hockey defenceman.

Eriksson played in the Swedish Elitserien for MODO Hockey, AIK and VIK Västerås HK.

He participated notably in the 1980 Olympic Winter Games in Lake Placid, New York, where Sweden won bronze in ice hockey tournament.
