= Mats Åhlberg =

Swedish ice hockey player

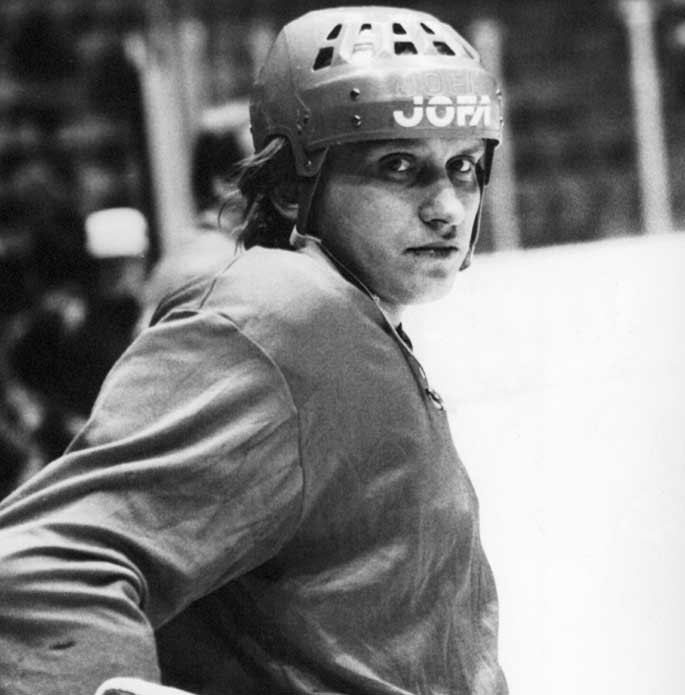
- Åhlberg in 1972
- Born: 16 May 1947 (age 79) Avesta, Sweden
- Height: 5 ft 10 in (178 cm)
- Weight: 174 lb (79 kg; 12 st 6 lb)
- Position: Centre
- Shot: Left
- Played for: Leksands IF
- National team: Sweden
- Playing career: 1963–1981
Medal record
Ice hockey
Representing Sweden
Olympic Games
| Bronze medal – third place | 1980 Lake Placid | Team competition |

Mats Bertil Åhlberg (born 16 May 1947) is a retired Swedish professional ice hockey player who played in the Elitserien. He played for Leksands IF, and with 323 goals in 491 matches remains the top goalscorer for that club. He won the Swedish national title with Leksands in 1969 and 1973–75.

He competed as a member of the Sweden men's national ice hockey team at the 1972 and 1980 Winter Olympics where he won the bronze medal. He was also a member of the Swedish 1976 Canada Cup team. In 1972, he played two matches and scored one goal. In 1980, he was Sweden's most productive player, with six goals and four assists. In total Åhlberg played 73 matches in international tournaments and scored 38 goals.
