= Vladimír Resl =

Czech luger (born 1953)

Medal record

Luge

Representing Czechoslovakia

European Championships
Bronze medal – third place	1978 Hammarstrand	Men's doubles

Vladimír Resl (born 3 March 1953, Liberec) is a Czech former luger who competed for Czechoslovakia in the late 1970s and early 1980s. He won the bronze medal in the men's doubles event at the 1978 FIL European Luge Championships in Hammarstrand, Sweden.

Resl also finished eighth in the men's doubles event at the 1980 Winter Olympics in Lake Placid, New York.
