= Harald Lückner =

Swedish ice hockey player and coach

- Born: 27 March 1957 (age 68) Mariestad, Sweden
- Height: 6 ft 1 in (185 cm)
- Weight: 198 lb (90 kg; 14 st 2 lb)
- Position: Left wing
- Shot: Left
- Played for: Färjestads BK; Sparta Warriors
- National team: Sweden
- NHL draft: 121st overall, 1977; New York Islanders; 56th overall, 1978; Vancouver Canucks
- WHA draft: 66th overall, 1977; Houston Aeros
- Playing career: 1974–1989

Olympic medal record

Men's Ice hockey
Bronze medal – third place	1980 Lake Placid	Team

Sven Harald Lückner (born 27 March 1957) is a Swedish retired professional ice hockey player and head coach.

During his career he played for Färjestads BK between 1974 and 1988. During that period he won three Swedish Championships.

He was drafted in the seventh round by the New York Islanders at the 1977 NHL amateur draft as 121st pick overall. The same year he also got selected as 66th overall by the Houston Aeros in the eight round of the 1977 WHA Amateur Draft.

Since the Islanders did not offer him a contract within one year, he became the first player to be drafted by a team in the NHL twice. This time the Vancouver Canucks selected Lückner in the fourth round, 56th overall, of the 1978 NHL Amateur Draft. However, he never played for any of the three teams.

Having played for Färjestad almost his entire career, he finished his playing career with one season as a player-coach for the Norwegian club Sparta Warriors in 1988–89.

After his retirement he has been a coach for several teams in the Elitserien, including Färjestads BK, HV71, Mora IK, Modo Hockey and Linköpings HC. In the 2006–07 season, he won the Swedish National Championship with Modo Hockey.
