= Stefan Kjernholm =

Swedish luger (1951–2023)

Personal information
- Nationality: Swedish
- Born: 13 September 1951; Stockholm, Sweden
- Died: 28 January 2023 (aged 71); Umeå, Sweden

Sport
- Sport: Luge

Stefan Kjernholm (13 September 1951 – 28 January 2023) was a Swedish luger. He competed at the 1976 Winter Olympics and the 1980 Winter Olympics.
