= John Fee (luger) =

American luger (born 1951)

Personal information
- Born: April 22, 1951 (age 75) Plattsburgh, New York, United States

Sport
- Sport: Luge

John Fee (born April 22, 1951) is an American luger. He competed at the 1976 Winter Olympics and the 1980 Winter Olympics. He later provided commentary for luge and bobsled events, including the 1994 Winter Olympics.

== Information ==
Fee dreamed of racing cars as a child. He first saw luge on television as a 17 year old, but did not know where he could learn to luge. Fee got into bobsledding while attending State University for art in Plattsburgh, New York. Fee claimed that luge gave him an "adrenaline rush" and described it as awesome and terrifying He stood at 6-foot-2 and weighed 180 pounds during his peak. He claimed that he had little training for the 1976 Winter Olympics and said the US luge team did not have their own track. He was the development coach for the U.S. Luge Association from 1983–84 and the Us national luge team coach from 1984-85.

Fee was also a king crab and salmon commercial fisherman in Alaska outside of the luge, claiming to work boats in 40’ seas with winds of 90 miles an hour. He moved to Marco Island, Florida in 1991 and then moved to Naples, Florida in 1992. He raced in both singles and pairs at the 1980 Winter Olympics with his best result being a 14th place finish in singles.

Outside of luge, Fee enjoys making stained glass windows and fishing for king crab.
