= 1975–76 Elitserien season =

1975–76 SHL season
- League: Elitserien
- Sport: Ice hockey
- Duration: 5 October 1975 – 26 February 1976

Regular season
- League champion: Brynäs IF

Playoffs
- Finals champions: Brynäs IF
- Runners-up: Färjestads BK

SHL seasons
- Division I 1974–75 1976–77

The 1975–76 Elitserien season was the first season of the Elitserien, the top level of ice hockey in Sweden. 10 teams participated in the league, and Brynäs IF won the Swedish championship.

== Standings ==
Teams 1–4 qualify for 1976 Swedish championship playoffs
Teams 9–10 relegated to Division 1 for 1976–77

| | Club | GP | W | T | L | GF | GA | Pts |
|---|---|---|---|---|---|---|---|---|
| 1. | Brynäs IF | 36 | 23 | 5 | 8 | 228 | 136 | 51 |
| 2. | Leksands IF | 36 | 19 | 8 | 9 | 189 | 153 | 46 |
| 3. | Färjestad BK | 36 | 17 | 6 | 13 | 145 | 140 | 40 |
| 4. | Skellefteå AIK | 36 | 15 | 8 | 13 | 152 | 150 | 38 |
| 5. | MoDo AIK | 36 | 17 | 4 | 15 | 150 | 150 | 38 |
| 6. | Södertälje SK | 36 | 10 | 13 | 13 | 154 | 177 | 33 |
| 7 | Västra Frölunda IF | 36 | 14 | 4 | 18 | 154 | 153 | 32 |
| 8. | AIK | 36 | 14 | 4 | 18 | 128 | 167 | 32 |
| 9. | Djurgårdens IF | 36 | 14 | 3 | 19 | 170 | 197 | 31 |
| 10. | Timrå IK | 36 | 7 | 5 | 24 | 134 | 181 | 19 |

== Playoffs ==
Semifinals
1 | Brynäs IF | 2
4 | MoDo AIK | 0
2 | Färjestad BK | 2
3 | Leksands IF | 1

Finals
1 | Brynäs IF | 2
2 | Färjestad BK | 0
Third place
4 | MoDo AIK | 0
3 | Leksands IF | 2

=== Semifinals ===
==== Färjestad BK vs Leksands IF ====
Färjestads won 2-1 in games following neutral site tiebreaker in Gothenburg's Scandinavium.

| 17 March 1976 | Färjestad BK | 4 – 3 (2–2, 1–1, 1–0) | Leksands IF | Attendance: 5,134 |

| 20 March 1976 | Leksands IF | 5 – 4 OT (1–1, 3–1, 0–2, 1–0) | Färjestad BK | Attendance: 4,418 |

| 22 March 1976 | Färjestad BK | 3 – 2 (1–1, 1–1, 1–0) | Leksands IF | Scandinavium, Gothenburg; Neutral site Attendance: 11,350 |

==== Brynäs IF vs MoDo AIK ====
Brynäs won 2-0 in games.

| 17 March 1976 | Brynäs IF | 4 – 2 (1–1, 2–0, 1–1) | MoDo AIK | Attendance: 5,802 |

| 20 March 1976 | MoDo AIK | 4 – 5 OT (3–1, 0–2, 1–1, 0–1) | Brynäs IF | Attendance: 5,144 |

=== Finals ===
Brynäs IF won the series 2–0 and were crowned Swedish ice hockey champions in 1976.

| 24 March 1976 | Färjestad BK | 2 – 6 (1–3, 1–2, 0–1) | Brynäs IF | Scandinavium, Gothenburg; Neutral site Attendance: 6,978 |

| 27 March 1976 | Brynäs IF | 9 – 3 (1–2, 3–1, 5–0) | Färjestad BK | Attendance: 6,311 |

=== Third place series ===
Leksand won 2–0 in games.

| 25 March 1976 | Leksands IF | 7 – 4 (1–1, 4–2, 2–1) | MoDo AIK | Attendance: 1,492 |

| 27 March 1976 | MoDo AIK | 5 – 6 (3–2, 2–1, 0–2) | Leksands IF | Attendance: 2,046 |
