= Hammarstrand =

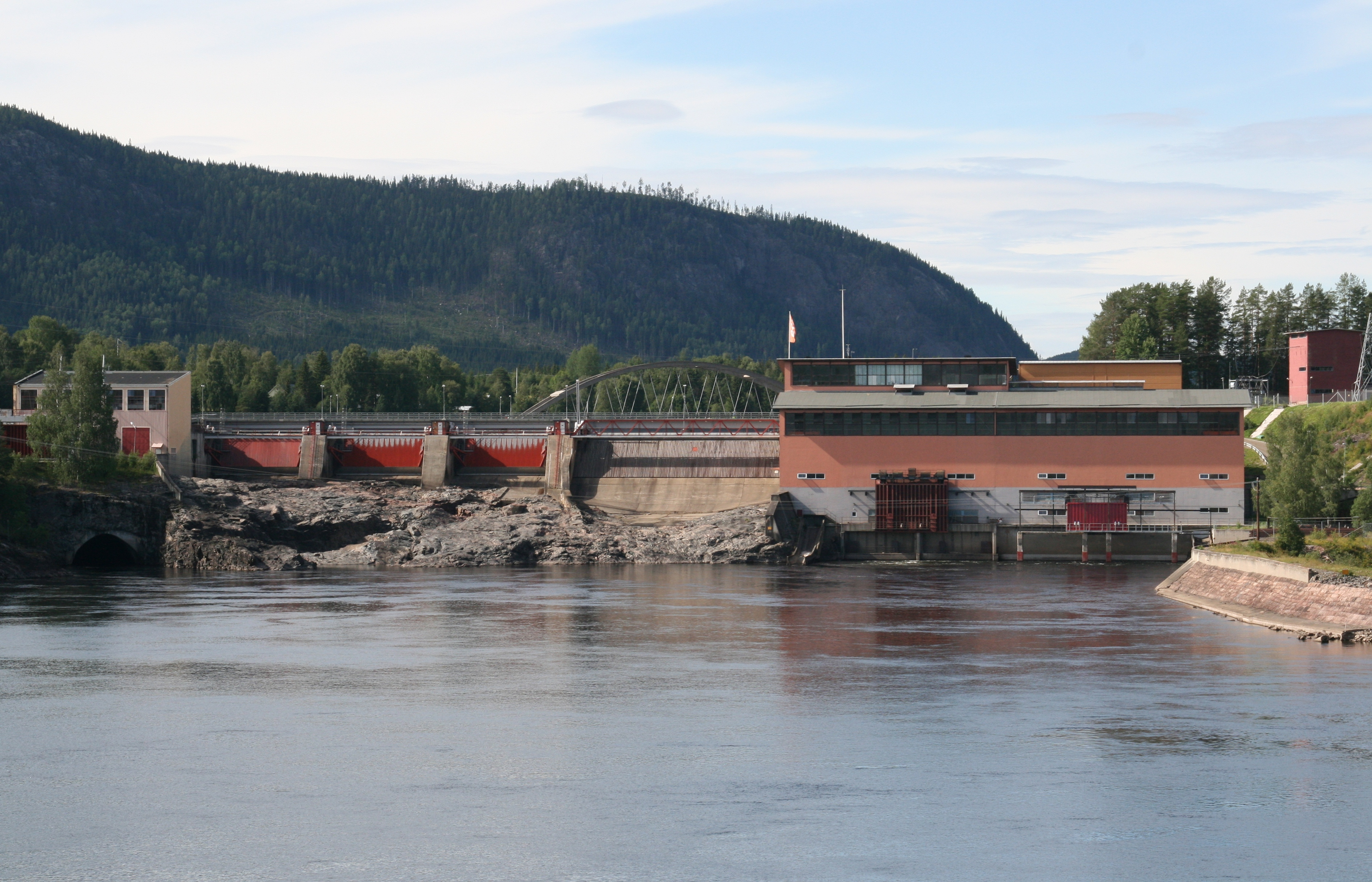
- Hammarforsens powerplant in Indalsälven near Hammarstrand

- Location within Jämtland Location within Sweden
- Coordinates: 63°06′N 16°21′E
- Country: Sweden
- Province: Jämtland
- County: Jämtland County
- Municipality: Ragunda Municipality

Area
  - Total: 2.22 km^{2} (0.86 sq mi)

Population (31 December 2010)
  - Total: 1,052
  - Density: 473/km^{2} (1,230/sq mi)
- Time zone: UTC+1 (CET)
  - Summer (DST): UTC+2 (CEST)

Hammarstrand is a locality and the seat of Ragunda Municipality in Jämtland County, Sweden with 1,052 inhabitants in 2010. The town is host to a bobsleigh and luge track. It was built on the dry bed of the former lake Ragundasjön, which drained suddenly and catastrophically in 1796.

== Bobsleigh and luge track ==
Constructed in 1964, the track was 1045 meters long with 11 curves and a start height of 900 meters. Its last World Cup luge competition was held in 1990. Until the completion of the bobsleigh and luge track used for the 1994 Winter Olympics at Lillehammer in 1992, it was the only track of its kind in Scandinavia. The track was the last natural track to host the FIL European Luge Championships and was the last natural track to host the FIL World Luge Championships until the 2000 event in St. Moritz, Switzerland. Its last use was in 2001.

== Tourist attractions ==
Tourist attractions include waterfalls Döda Fallet (The Dead Falls) Meåfallet, Lugnåfallet; Borgvattnet, the Haunted Vicarage; Suspension Bridge over the Indalsälven; Ragunda church; Krångede Power Plant and the famous Thai Pavilion, which is King Chulalongkorn Memorial Building. It is the largest Thai Pavilion in the world outside Thailand. Its creation began in 1997 to celebrate the 100th anniversary of the visit of King of Siam. This dates back to 1897 when Oscar II, King of Sweden and Norway, invited King Chulalongkorn of Siam to an art and industry exhibition in Sweden.

=== Track statistics ===
Turn names
Turn Number	Name	Reason named (in Swedish)
1.	Lillen	"The little one"
2.	Sista skriket	"Last scream"
3.	Centrumkurvan	"The center curve"
4.	Ole	"Eeny" in Swedish. Luge women's singles men's doubles joins the track after this curve.
5.	Dole	"Meeny" in Swedish
6.	Doff	"Miney" & "Moe" in Swedish
7.	Lady	"Lady"
8.	Sunekurvan	"The Sune curve", named after Sune Nilsson, a former chairman of the local luge club.
9.	Ding	
10.	Dong	
11.	Målkurvan	"The finish curve"

=== Championships hosted ===
- FIL European Luge Championships: 1970, 1976, 1978, 1986
- FIL World Luge Championships: 1967, 1975, 1981

== Gallery ==
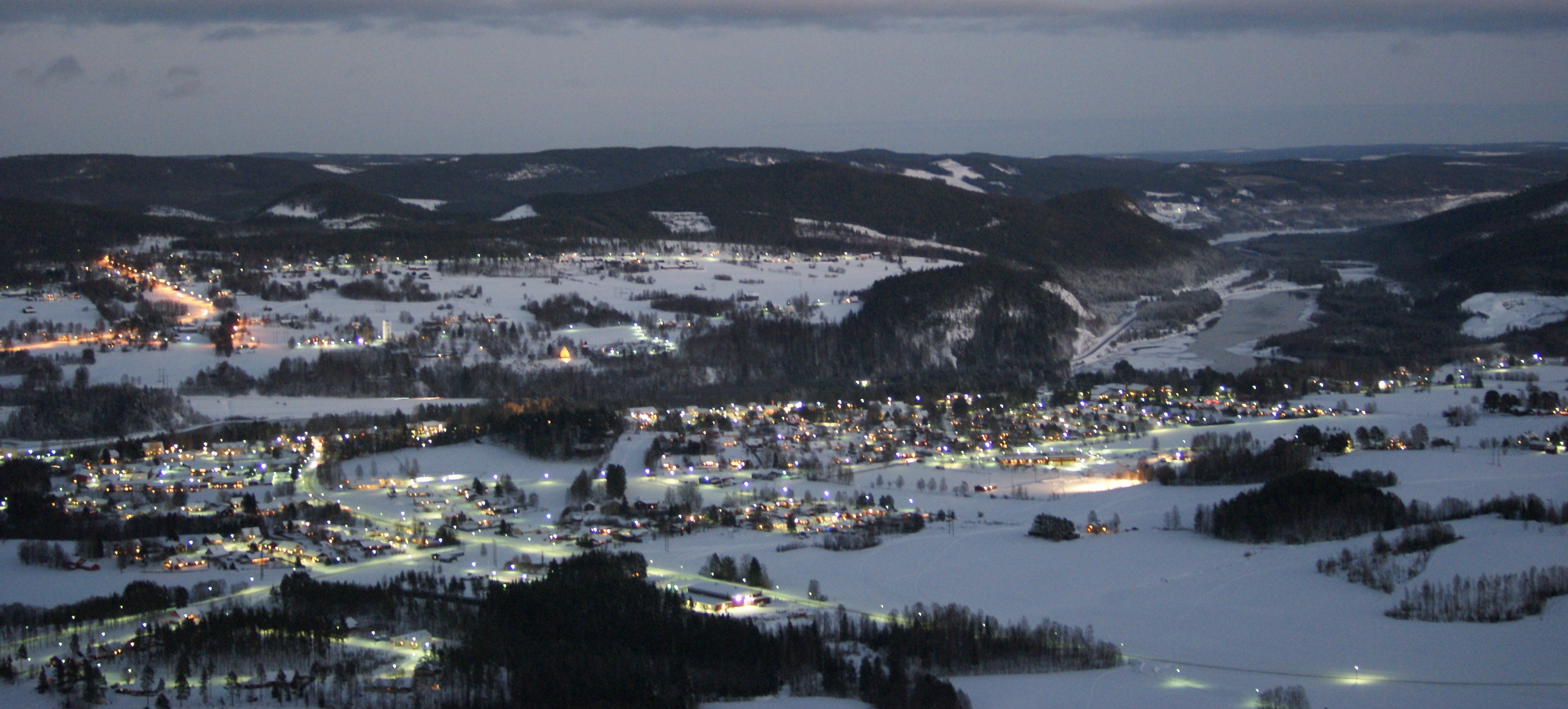
Hammarstrand as seen by night in December 2008.

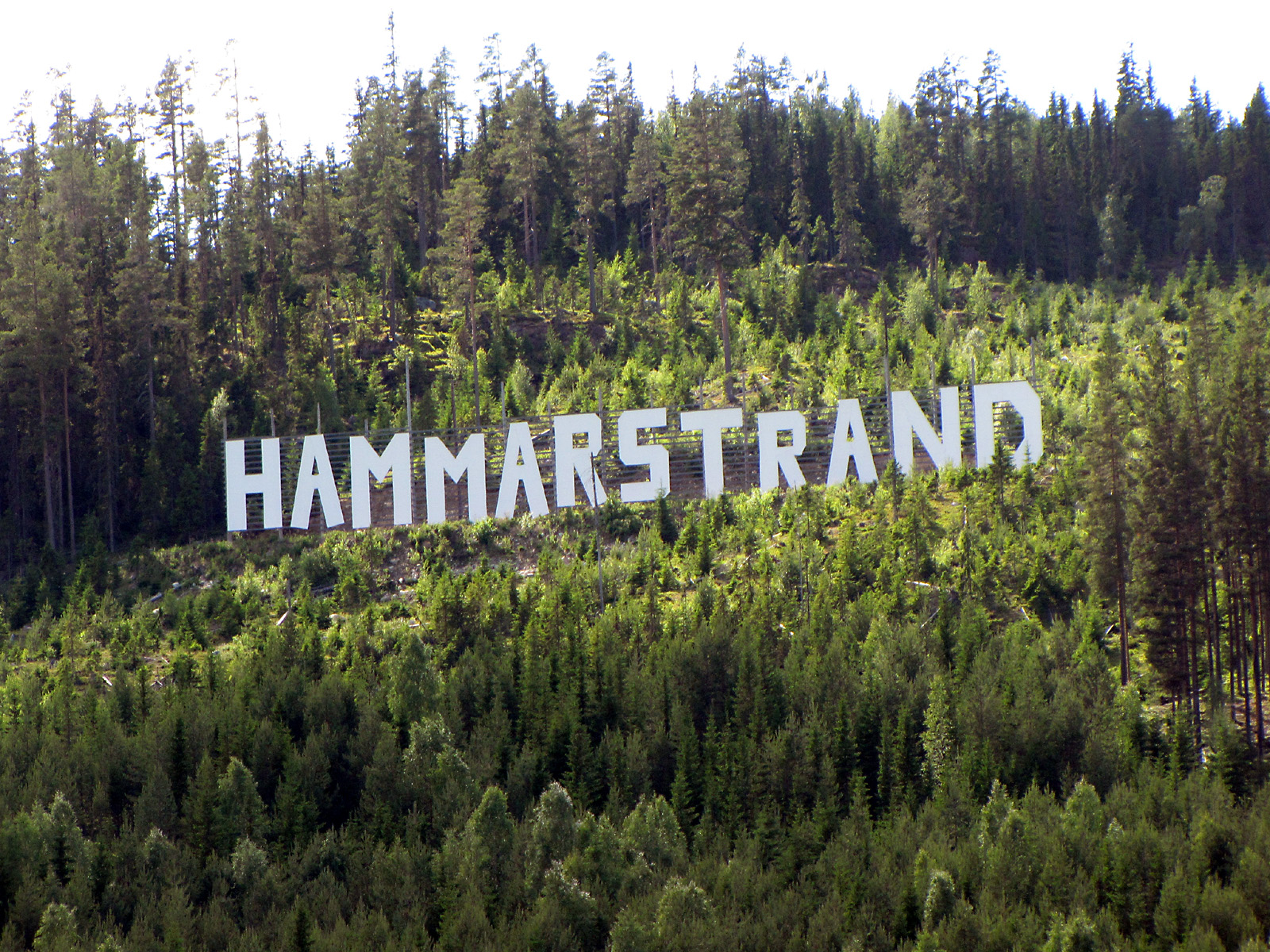
The large Hollywood Sign-style sign outside of Hammarstrand.
