= Austria at the 1984 Winter Olympics =

- IOC code: AUT
- NOC: Austrian Olympic Committee
- Website: www.olympia.at (in German)

in Sarajevo
- Competitors: 65 (58 men and 7 women) in 9 sports
- Flag bearers: Franz Klammer, Alpine Skiing
- Medals Ranked 17th: Gold 0 Silver 0 Bronze 1 Total 1

Winter Olympics appearances (overview)
- 1924; 1928; 1932; 1936; 1948; 1952; 1956; 1960; 1964; 1968; 1972; 1976; 1980; 1984; 1988; 1992; 1994; 1998; 2002; 2006; 2010; 2014; 2018; 2022; 2026

Austria competed at the 1984 Winter Olympics in Sarajevo, Yugoslavia.

== Medalists ==
Medal	Name	Sport	Event	Date
Bronze	Anton Steiner	Alpine Skiing	Men's downhill	16 February

== Alpine skiing ==
Anton "Jimmy" Steiner was the only Austrian competitor to win an olympic medal (bronze) in the 1984 Winter Olympics.

Men

Athlete	Event	Race 1		Race 2		Total	
Athlete	Event	Time	Rank	Time	Rank	Time	Rank
Erwin Resch	Downhill					1:47.06	11
Franz Klammer	Downhill					1:47.04	10
Helmut Höflehner	Downhill					1:46.32	5
Anton Steiner	Downhill					1:45.95	3rd place, bronze medalist(s)
Hans Enn	Giant Slalom	DNF	–	–	–	DNF	–
Anton Steiner	Giant Slalom	DNF	–	–	–	DNF	–
Hubert Strolz	Giant Slalom	1:21.47	6	1:21.24	8	2:42.71	6
Franz Gruber	Giant Slalom	1:21.03	3	1:21.05	4	2:42.08	4
Anton Steiner	Slalom	DSQ	–	–	–	DSQ	–
Franz Gruber	Slalom	DSQ	–	–	–	DSQ	–
Hubert Strolz	Slalom	DNF	–	–	–	DNF	–
Hans Enn	Slalom	54.05	22	DNF	–	DNF	–

Women

Athlete	Event	Race 1		Race 2		Total	
Athlete	Event	Time	Rank	Time	Rank	Time	Rank
Sylvia Eder	Downhill					1:14.97	13
Veronika Stallmaier-Wallinger	Downhill					1:14.76	10
Elisabeth Kirchler	Downhill					1:14.55	9
Lea Sölkner	Downhill					1:14.39	8
Elisabeth Kirchler	Giant Slalom	DNF	–	–	–	DNF	–
Sylvia Eder	Giant Slalom	1:13.00	39	1:16.03	34	2:29.03	34
Roswitha Steiner	Giant Slalom	1:12.09	29	1:14.47	28	2:26.56	27
Anni Kronbichler	Giant Slalom	1:11.40	19	1:12.77	12	2:24.17	14
Veronika Stallmaier-Wallinger	Slalom	DNF	–	–	–	DNF	–
Lea Sölkner	Slalom	DNF	–	–	–	DNF	–
Roswitha Steiner	Slalom	49.22	7	48.62	5	1:37.84	4
Anni Kronbichler	Slalom	48.84	3	49.21	12	1:38.05	8

== Biathlon ==
Men

Event	Athlete	Misses ^{1}	Time	Rank
10 km Sprint	Walter Hörl	5	35:02.6	39
10 km Sprint	Rudolf Horn	4	34:46.0	36
10 km Sprint	Alfred Eder	2	33:17.9	22

Event	Athlete	Time	Penalties	Adjusted time ^{2}	Rank
20 km	Rudolf Horn	1'15:10.8	8	1'23:10.8	36
20 km	Alfred Eder	1'16:52.6	6	1'22:52.6	34
20 km	Franz Schuler	1'16:23.0	5	1'21:23.0	30

Men's 4 x 7.5 km relay

Athletes	Race		
Athletes	Misses ^{1}	Time	Rank
Rudolf Horn; Walter Hörl; Franz Schuler; Alfred Eder	1	1'43:28.1	8

^{1} A penalty loop of 150 metres had to be skied per missed target.
^{2} One minute added per missed target.

== Bobsleigh ==
Sled	Athletes	Event	Run 1		Run 2		Run 3		Run 4		Total	
Sled	Athletes	Event	Time	Rank	Time	Rank	Time	Rank	Time	Rank	Time	Rank
AUT-1	Walter Delle Karth; Hans Lindner	Two-man	52.61	10	53.01	13	52.33	12	52.64	14	3:30.59	12
AUT-2	Peter Kienast; Christian Mark	Two-man	52.79	13	52.97	11	52.42	14	52.47	12	3:30.65	13

Sled	Athletes	Event	Run 1		Run 2		Run 3		Run 4		Total	
Sled	Athletes	Event	Time	Rank	Time	Rank	Time	Rank	Time	Rank	Time	Rank
AUT-1	Walter Delle Karth; Günter Krispel; Ferdinand Grössing; Hans Lindner	Four-man	50.60	7	51.14	11	51.19	9	51.28	10	3:24.21	10
AUT-2	Peter Kienast; Franz Siegl; Gerhard Redl; Christian Mark	Four-man	50.83	11	51.27	13	51.29	12	51.24	8	3:24.63	11

== Cross-country skiing ==
Men

Event	Athlete	Race	
Event	Athlete	Time	Rank
15 km	Andreas Gumpold	46:34.5	53
15 km	Alois Stadlober	43:51.6	25
30 km	Peter Juric	1'37:06.6	35
30 km	Franz Gattermann	1'36:03.9	31
50 km	Peter Juric	2'28:38.8	33
50 km	Franz Gattermann	2'26:40.8	29
50 km	Alois Stadlober	2'25:26.3	24

Men's 4 × 10 km relay

Athletes	Race	
Athletes	Time	Rank
Andreas Gumpold; Franz Gatterman; Peter Juric; Alois Stadlober	2'04:39.0	11

== Ice hockey ==
=== Group B ===
Top two teams (shaded ones) advanced to the medal round.

Team	Pld	W	L	T	GF	GA	Pts
Czechoslovakia	5	5	0	0	38	7	10
Canada	5	4	1	0	24	10	8
Finland	5	2	2	1	27	19	5
United States	5	1	2	2	16	17	4
Austria	5	1	4	0	13	37	2
Norway	5	0	4	1	15	43	1

- Finland 4-3 Austria
- Canada 8-1 Austria
- Czechoslovakia 13-0 Austria
- USA 7-3 Austria
- Austria 6-5 Norway

Contestants; Helmut Koren; Herbert Pöck; Bernard Hutz; Ed Lebler; Fritz Ganster; Giuseppe Mion; Helmut Petrik; Johann Fritz; Kelly Greenbank; Konrad Dorn; Kuno Sekulic; Kurt Harand; Leopold Sivec; Martin Platzer; Michael Rudman; Peter Raffl; Rick Cunningham; Rudolf König; Thomas Cijan

== Luge ==
Men

Athlete	Run 1		Run 2		Run 3		Run 4		Total	
Athlete	Time	Rank	Time	Rank	Time	Rank	Time	Rank	Time	Rank
Georg Fluckinger	47.552	19	47.000	13	46.989	14	46.448	9	3:07.989	15
Gerhard Sandbichler	46.601	10	46.613	9	46.542	9	46.697	13	3:06.453	10
Markus Prock	46.458	9	46.571	8	46.345	6	46.465	10	3:05.839	8

(Men's) Doubles

Athletes	Run 1		Run 2		Total	
Athletes	Time	Rank	Time	Rank	Time	Rank
Georg Fluckinger; Franz Wilhelmer	42.013	4	41.889	3	1:23.902	4
Günther Lemmerer; Franz Lechleitner	42.188	7	41.945	5	1:24.133	5

Women

Athlete	Run 1		Run 2		Run 3		Run 4		Total	
Athlete	Time	Rank	Time	Rank	Time	Rank	Time	Rank	Time	Rank
Annefried Göllner	42.437	6	42.643	10	42.219	9	42.074	10	2:49.373	7

== Nordic combined ==
Events:

- normal hill ski jumping (Three jumps, best two counted and shown here.)
- 15 km cross-country skiing

Athlete	Event	Ski Jumping				Cross-country			Total	
Athlete	Event	Distance 1	Distance 2	Points	Rank	Time	Points	Rank	Points	Rank
Klaus Sulzenbacher	Individual	78.5	90.0	204.0	7	49:48.2	190.570	14	394.570	9

== Ski jumping ==
Athlete	Event	Jump 1		Jump 2		Total	
Athlete	Event	Distance	Points	Distance	Points	Points	Rank
Armin Kogler	Normal hill	72.0	74.7	74.0	78.4	153.1	52
Ernst Vettori	Normal hill	84.5	97.2	72.5	76.0	173.2	36
Hans Wallner	Normal hill	83.0	97.8	79.0	88.9	186.7	24
Andreas Felder	Normal hill	84.0	99.9	87.0	105.7	205.6	6
Hans Wallner	Large hill	94.0	80.3	100.0	93.2	173.5	24
Andreas Felder	Large hill	94.0	80.8	99.5	89.5	170.3	28
Manfred Steiner	Large hill	96.0	85.6	84.0	63.8	149.4	41
Armin Kogler	Large hill	106.0	103.1	99.5	92.5	195.6	6

== Speed skating ==
Men

Event	Athlete	Race	
Event	Athlete	Time	Rank
500 m	Michael Hadschieff	40.52	32
1000 m	Christian Eminger	1:20.98	33
1000 m	Michael Hadschieff	1:19.05	22
1500 m	Christian Eminger	2:03.18	28
1500 m	Michael Hadschieff	2:02.06	20
1500 m	Werner Jäger	2:01.03	15
5000 m	Heinz Steinberger	7:32.72	20
5000 m	Michael Hadschieff	7:25.07	13
5000 m	Werner Jäger	7:18.61	8
10,000 m	Heinz Steinberger	15:18.19	19
10,000 m	Werner Jäger	15:07.59	12
10,000 m	Michael Hadschieff	14:53.78	5
