= Austria at the 1980 Winter Olympics =

- IOC code: AUT
- NOC: Austrian Olympic Committee
- Website: www.olympia.at (in German)

in Lake Placid
- Competitors: 43 (33 men, 10 women) in 6 sports
- Flag bearer: Annemarie Moser-Pröll (alpine skiing)
- Medals Ranked 4th: Gold 3 Silver 2 Bronze 2 Total 7

Winter Olympics appearances (overview)
- 1924; 1928; 1932; 1936; 1948; 1952; 1956; 1960; 1964; 1968; 1972; 1976; 1980; 1984; 1988; 1992; 1994; 1998; 2002; 2006; 2010; 2014; 2018; 2022; 2026; 2030

Austria competed at the 1980 Winter Olympics in Lake Placid, United States.

== Medalists ==
Medal	Name	Sport	Event
Gold	Leonhard Stock	Alpine Skiing	Men's downhill
Gold	Annemarie Moser-Proll	Alpine Skiing	Women's downhill
Gold	Anton Innauer	Ski Jumping	Men's Normal Hill
Silver	Peter Wirnsberger	Alpine Skiing	Men's downhill
Silver	Hubert Neuper	Ski Jumping	Men's Large Hill
Bronze	Hans Enn	Alpine Skiing	Men's giant slalom
Bronze	Georg Fluckinger; Karl Schrott	Luge	Doubles

== Alpine skiing ==
Men

Athlete	Event	Race 1		Race 2		Total	
Athlete	Event	Time	Rank	Time	Rank	Time	Rank
Harti Weirather	Downhill					1:47.70	9
Werner Grissmann	Downhill					1:47.21	7
Peter Wirnsberger	Downhill					1:46.12	2nd place, silver medalist(s)
Leonhard Stock	Downhill					1:45.50	1st place, gold medalist(s)
Leonhard Stock	Giant slalom	1:22.97	27	1:24.43	26	2:47.40	26
Anton Steiner	Giant slalom	1:21.93	17	1:23.83	21	2:45.76	18
Christian Orlainsky	Giant slalom	1:21.92	16	1:22.78	12	2:44.70	13
Hans Enn	Giant slalom	1:20.31	2	1:22.20	8	2:42.51	3rd place, bronze medalist(s)
Christian Orlainsky	Slalom	DSQ	–	–	–	DSQ	–
Leonhard Stock	Slalom	56.43	18	53.98	19	1:50.41	18
Anton Steiner	Slalom	54.56	6	50.85	4	1:45.41	7
Hans Enn	Slalom	53.70	2	51.42	7	1:45.12	4

Women

Athlete	Event	Race 1		Race 2		Total	
Athlete	Event	Time	Rank	Time	Rank	Time	Rank
Cornelia Pröll	Downhill					1:42.44	22
Ingrid Eberle	Downhill					1:39.63	6
Annemarie Moser-Pröll	Downhill					1:37.52	1st place, gold medalist(s)
Regina Sackl	Giant slalom	DNF	–	–	–	DNF	–
Lea Sölkner	Giant slalom	1:18.30	21	DNF	–	DNF	–
Ingrid Eberle	Giant slalom	1:18.18	19	1:29.24	10	2:47.42	14
Annemarie Moser-Pröll	Giant slalom	1:15.64	7	1:27.55	6	2:43.19	6
Lea Sölkner	Slalom	DNF	–	–	–	DNF	–
Annemarie Moser-Pröll	Slalom	DNF	–	–	–	DNF	–
Regina Sackl	Slalom	DNF	–	–	–	DNF	–
Ingrid Eberle	Slalom	45.21	16	46.50	14	1:31.71	13

== Biathlon ==
Men

Event	Athlete	Misses ^{1}	Time	Rank
10 km Sprint	Rudolf Horn	5	36:31.25	28
10 km Sprint	Alfred Eder	4	35:58.27	23
10 km Sprint	Franz-Josef Weber	1	34:25.28	11

Event	Athlete	Time	Penalties	Adjusted time ^{2}	Rank
20 km	Rudolf Horn	1'10:03.83	6	1'16:03.83	26
20 km	Alfred Eder	1'11:44.28	4	1'15:44.28	24
20 km	Siegfried Dockner	1'10:35.28	4	1'14:35.28	17

Men's 4 x 7.5 km relay

Athletes	Race		
Athletes	Misses ^{1}	Time	Rank
Rudolf Horn; Franz-Josef Weber; Josef Koll; Alfred Eder	4	1'38:32.02	6

^{1} A penalty loop of 150 metres had to be skied per missed target.
^{2} One minute added per close miss (a hit in the outer ring), two minutes added per complete miss.

== Bobsleigh ==
Sled	Athletes	Event	Run 1		Run 2		Run 3		Run 4		Total	
Sled	Athletes	Event	Time	Rank	Time	Rank	Time	Rank	Time	Rank	Time	Rank
AUT-1	Franz Paulweber; Gerd Zaunschirm	Two-man	1:03.52	8	1:03.67	9	1:03.01	6	1:03.70	9	4:13.90	9
AUT-2	Fritz Sperling; Kurt Oberhöller	Two-man	1:03.58	10	1:03.64	8	1:03.13	7	1:03.23	6	4:13.58	7

Sled	Athletes	Event	Run 1		Run 2		Run 3		Run 4		Total	
Sled	Athletes	Event	Time	Rank	Time	Rank	Time	Rank	Time	Rank	Time	Rank
AUT-1	Fritz Sperling; Heinrich Bergmüller; Franz Rednak; Bernhard Purkrabek	Four-man	1:00.75	4	1:00.77	4	1:00.41	6	1:00.69	5	4:02.62	4
AUT-2	Walter Delle Karth; Franz Paulweber; Gerd Zaunschirm; Kurt Oberhöller	Four-man	1:00.91	5	1:01.12	7	1:00.25	4	1:00.67	4	4:02.95	5

== Figure skating ==
Women

Athlete	CF	SP	FS	Points	Places	Rank
Claudia Kristofics-Binder	5	7	9	176.88	60	7

Ice Dancing

Athletes	CD	FD	Points	Places	Rank
Susanne Handschmann; Peter Handschmann	11	11	177.78	96	11

== Luge ==
Men

Athlete	Run 1		Run 2		Run 3		Run 4		Total	
Athlete	Time	Rank	Time	Rank	Time	Rank	Time	Rank	Time	Rank
Albert Graf	44.253	11	44.524	6	44.815	8	44.431	8	2:58.023	9
Franz Wilhelmer	44.162	10	44.783	10	44.159	4	44.379	7	2:57.483	6
Gerhard Sandbichler	44.128	9	44.711	8	44.305	5	44.307	5	2:57.421	5

(Men's) Doubles

Athletes	Run 1		Run 2		Total	
Athletes	Time	Rank	Time	Rank	Time	Rank
Georg Fluckinger; Karl Schrott	39.509	2	40.286	8	1:19.914	3rd place, bronze medalist(s)
Günther Lemmerer; Reinhold Sulzbacher	40.017	9	40.486	9	1:20.503	9

Women

Athlete	Run 1		Run 2		Run 3		Run 4		Total	
Athlete	Time	Rank	Time	Rank	Time	Rank	Time	Rank	Time	Rank
Annefried Göllner	40.378	15	40.375	12	40.489	14	40.394	13	2:41.636	14
Christine Brunner	39.642	9	40.083	9	39.833	9	40.265	11	2:39.823	10
Angelika Schafferer	39.411	5	40.249	10	39.731	7	39.544	7	2:38.935	7

== Ski jumping ==
Athlete	Event	Jump 1		Jump 2		Total	
Athlete	Event	Distance	Points	Distance	Points	Points	Rank
Hubert Neuper	Normal hill	82.5	116.7	88.5	128.8	245.5	6
Armin Kogler	Normal hill	85.0	123.2	79.0	111.6	234.8	12
Alfred Groyer	Normal hill	85.5	124.5	83.5	120.8	245.3	7
Toni Innauer	Normal hill	89.0	131.6	90.0	134.7	266.3	1st place, gold medalist(s)
Hans Millonig	Large hill	97.0	101.5	100.5	107.4	208.9	25
Armin Kogler	Large hill	110.0	123.7	108.0	121.9	245.6	5
Toni Innauer	Large hill	110.0	126.2	107.0	119.5	245.7	4
Hubert Neuper	Large hill	113.0	129.9	114.5	132.5	262.4	2nd place, silver medalist(s)
