= Luge at the 1984 Winter Olympics – Doubles =

Doubles at the XIV Olympic Winter Games
- Venue: Sarajevo Olympic Bobsleigh and Luge Track
- Dates: 15 February 1984
- Competitors: 30 from 9 nations
- Winning time: 1:23.620

Medalists
1st place, gold medalist(s)		West Germany; Hans Stangassinger, Franz Wembacher
2nd place, silver medalist(s)		Soviet Union; Yevgeny Belousov, Aleksandr Belyakov
3rd place, bronze medalist(s)		East Germany; Jörg Hoffmann, Jochen Pietzsch

The Doubles luge competition at the 1984 Winter Olympics in Sarajevo was held on 15 February, at Sarajevo Olympic Bobsleigh and Luge Track.

== Results ==
Rank	Athletes	Country	Run 1	Run 2	Total
1st place, gold medalist(s)	Hans Stangassinger; Franz Wembacher	West Germany	41.880	41.740	1:23.620
2nd place, silver medalist(s)	Yevgeny Belousov; Aleksandr Belyakov	Soviet Union	41.813	41.847	1:23.660
3rd place, bronze medalist(s)	Jörg Hoffmann; Jochen Pietzsch	East Germany	41.996	41.891	1:23.887
4	Georg Fluckinger; Franz Wilhelmer	Austria	42.013	41.889	1:23.902
5	Günther Lemmerer; Franz Lechleitner	Austria	42.188	41.945	1:24.133
6	Hansjörg Raffl; Norbert Huber	Italy	42.369	41.984	1:24.353
7	Juris Eisaks; Einārs Veikša	Soviet Union	42.078	42.288	1:24.366
8	Thomas Schwab; Wolfgang Staudinger	West Germany	42.267	42.367	1:24.634
9	Ronald Rossi; Doug Bateman	United States	42.400	42.251	1:24.651
10	Helmuth Brunner; Walter Brunner	Italy	42.039	42.749	1:24.788
11	Ioan Apostol; Laurenţiu Bălănoiu	Romania	42.918	42.742	1:25.660
12	Takashi Takagi; Tsukasa Hirakawa	Japan	43.047	42.980	1:26.027
13	Frank Masley; Ray Bateman Jr.	United States	43.047	43.284	1:26.331
14	Stanislav Ptáčník; Martin Förster	Czechoslovakia	44.361	43.562	1:27.923
15	Hans-Joachim Menge; Detlef Bertz	East Germany	46.935	47.238	1:34.173
