= Luge at the 1988 Winter Olympics – Doubles =

Doubles at the XV Olympic Winter Games
- Venue: Canada Olympic Park
- Dates: 19 February 1988
- Competitors: 36 from 11 nations
- Winning time: 1:31.940

Medalists
1st place, gold medalist(s)		East Germany; Jörg Hoffmann, Jochen Pietzsch
2nd place, silver medalist(s)		East Germany; Stefan Krauße, Jan Behrendt
3rd place, bronze medalist(s)		West Germany; Thomas Schwab, Wolfgang Staudinger

The Doubles luge competition at the 1988 Winter Olympics in Calgary was held on 19 February, at Canada Olympic Park.

== Results ==
Rank	Athletes	Country	Run 1	Run 2	Total
1st place, gold medalist(s)	Jörg Hoffmann; Jochen Pietzsch	East Germany	45.786	46.154	1:31.940
2nd place, silver medalist(s)	Stefan Krauße; Jan Behrendt	East Germany	45.886	46.153	1:32.039
3rd place, bronze medalist(s)	Thomas Schwab; Wolfgang Staudinger	West Germany	46.024	46.250	1:32.274
4	Stefan Ilsanker; Georg Hackl	West Germany	46.054	46.244	1:32.298
5	Georg Fluckinger; Robert Manzenreiter	Austria	46.135	46.229	1:32.364
6	Vitaly Melnik; Dmitry Alekseyev	Soviet Union	46.060	46.399	1:32.459
7	Yevgeny Belousov; Aleksandr Belyakov	Soviet Union	45.973	46.580	1:32.553
7	Kurt Brugger; Wilfried Huber	Italy	46.125	46.428	1:32.553
9	Bernhard Kammerer; Walter Brunner	Italy	46.381	46.790	1:33.171
10	Bob Gasper; André Benoit	Canada	46.240	47.066	1:33.306
11	Miro Zajonc; Timothy Nardiello	United States	46.482	46.838	1:33.320
12	Gerhard Sandbichler; Franz Lechleitner	Austria	46.771	46.691	1:33.462
13	Petr Urban; Luboš Jíra	Czechoslovakia	46.388	47.233	1:33.621
14	Kazuhiko Takamatsu; Tsukasa Hirakawa	Japan	47.129	47.324	1:34.453
15	Stephen Brialey; Nick Ovett	Great Britain	46.912	47.764	1:34.676
16	Joe Barile; Steven Maher	United States	46.262	48.701	1:34.963
17	Sam Salmon; Dan Doll	Canada	48.300	49.058	1:37.358
18	Krasimir Kamenov; Mitko Bachev	Bulgaria	51.957	48.620	1:40.577
