= Bobsleigh at the 1980 Winter Olympics – Four-man =

Four-man at the XIII Olympic Winter Games
- Venue: Mt. Van Hoevenberg Olympic Bobsled Run
- Dates: February 23 — 24, 1980
- Competitors: 68 from 10 nations
- Winning time: 3:59.92

Medalists
1st place, gold medalist(s)		East Germany; Meinhard Nehmer, Bernhard Germeshausen, Bogdan Musioł, Hans-Jürgen Gerhardt
2nd place, silver medalist(s)		Switzerland; Erich Schärer, Ueli Bächli, Ruedi Marti, Sepp Benz
3rd place, bronze medalist(s)		East Germany; Horst Schönau, Roland Wetzig, Detlef Richter, Andreas Kirchner

The Four-man bobsleigh competition at the 1980 Winter Olympics in Lake Placid was held on 23 and 24 February, at Mt. Van Hoevenberg Olympic Bobsled Run.

== Results ==
Rank	Country	Athletes	Run 1	Run 2	Run 3	Run 4	Total
1st place, gold medalist(s)	East Germany (GDR-1)	Meinhard Nehmer; Bernhard Germeshausen; Bogdan Musioł; Hans-Jürgen Gerhardt	59.86	60.03	59.73	60.30	3:59.92
2nd place, silver medalist(s)	Switzerland (SUI-1)	Erich Schärer; Ueli Bächli; Ruedi Marti; Sepp Benz	60.31	60.41	60.02	60.13	4:00.87
3rd place, bronze medalist(s)	East Germany (GDR-2)	Horst Schönau; Roland Wetzig; Detlef Richter; Andreas Kirchner	60.24	60.35	60.04	60.34	4:00.97
4	Austria (AUT-1)	Fritz Sperling; Heinrich Bergmüller; Franz Rednak; Bernhard Purkrabek	60.75	60.77	60.41	60.69	4:02.62
5	Austria (AUT-2)	Walter Delle Karth; Franz Paulweber; Gerd Zaunschirm; Kurt Oberhöller	60.91	61.12	60.25	60.67	4:02.95
6	Switzerland (SUI-2)	Hans Hiltebrand; Ulrich Schindler; Walter Rahm; Armin Baumgartner	61.13	61.00	60.54	61.02	4:03.69
7	West Germany (FRG-1)	Peter Hell; Hans Wagner; Heinz Busche; Walter Barfuß	61.14	61.22	60.57	61.47	4:04.40
8	Romania (ROU-1)	Dragoș Panaitescu-Rapan; Dorel Cristudor; Sandu Mitrofan; Gheorghe Lixandru	61.42	61.32	60.61	61.33	4:04.68
9	Great Britain (GBR-1)	Jonnie Woodall; Tony Wallington; Corrie Brown; John Howell	61.44	61.42	60.98	61.08	4:04.92
10	West Germany (FRG-2)	Alois Schnorbus; Lothar Pongratz; Jürgen Hofmann; Martin Meinberg	61.54	61.47	60.93	61.21	4:05.15
11	Italy	Andrea Jory; Edmund Lanziner; Georg Werth; Giovanni Modena	61.26	61.66	61.01	61.37	4:05.30
12	United States (USA-1)	Bob Hickey; Jeff Jordan; Willie Davenport; Jeff Gadley	61.49	61.81	61.04	61.77	4:06.11
13	United States (USA-2)	Howard Siler, Jr. Joe Tyler; Jeff Jost; Dick Nalley	61.49	61.69	61.30	61.72	4:06.20
14	Romania (ROU-2)	Constantin Iancu; Ion Duminicel; Doru Frîncu; Constantin Obreja	61.85	62.16	61.74	61.76	4:07.51
15	Great Britain (GBR-2)	Jackie Price; Gomer Lloyd; Andrew Ogilvy-Wedderburn; Nick Phipps	61.79	61.90	62.11	61.89	4:07.69
-	Sweden	Carl-Erik Eriksson; Peter Jansson; Runald Beckman; Kenth Rönn	61.01	61.00	60.36	DQ	-
-	Canada	Martin Glynn; Alan MacLachlan; Serge Cantin; Robert Wilson	61.76	62.25	DNF	-	-
