= Italy at the 1980 Winter Olympics =

- IOC code: ITA
- NOC: Italian National Olympic Committee
- Website: www.coni.it (in Italian)

in Lake Placid
- Competitors: 46 (34 men, 12 women) in 8 sports
- Flag bearer: Gustav Thöni (alpine skiing)
- Medals Ranked 13th: Gold 0 Silver 2 Bronze 0 Total 2

Winter Olympics appearances (overview)
- 1924; 1928; 1932; 1936; 1948; 1952; 1956; 1960; 1964; 1968; 1972; 1976; 1980; 1984; 1988; 1992; 1994; 1998; 2002; 2006; 2010; 2014; 2018; 2022; 2026

Italy competed at the 1980 Winter Olympics in Lake Placid, United States.

== Medalists ==
Medal	Name	Sport	Event
Silver	Paul Hildgartner	Luge	Men's individual
Silver	Peter Gschnitzer; Karl Brunner	Luge	Men's doubles

== Alpine skiing ==
Men

Athlete	Event	Race 1		Race 2		Total	
Athlete	Event	Time	Rank	Time	Rank	Time	Rank
Giuliano Giardini	Downhill					1:48.98	15
Herbert Plank	Downhill					1:47.13	6
Mauro Bernardi	Giant Slalom	DNF	–	–	–	DNF	–
Piero Gros	Giant Slalom	1:22.15	20	DNF	–	DNF	–
Alex Giorgi	Giant Slalom	1:22.02	18	DNF	–	DNF	–
Bruno Nöckler	Giant Slalom	1:20.99	4	1:21.96	7	2:42.95	6
Paolo De Chiesa	Slalom	DNF	–	–	–	DNF	–
Bruno Nöckler	Slalom	DNF	–	–	–	DNF	–
Mauro Bernardi	Slalom	55.40	14	DNF	–	DNF	–
Gustavo Thoeni	Slalom	54.79	8	51.20	5	1:45.99	8

Women

Athlete	Event	Race 1		Race 2		Total	
Athlete	Event	Time	Rank	Time	Rank	Time	Rank
Cristina Gravina	Downhill					1:40.99	15
Daniela Zini	Giant Slalom	DNF	–	–	–	DNF	–
Wanda Bieler	Giant Slalom	DNF	–	–	–	DNF	–
Maria Rosa Quario	Giant Slalom	1:18.54	24	DNF	–	DNF	–
Claudia Giordani	Giant Slalom	1:17.72	17	1:28.55	8	2:46.27	10
Daniela Zini	Slalom	45.08	13	44.14	3	1:29.22	7
Wilma Gatta	Slalom	44.46	10	45.48	10	1:29.94	10
Claudia Giordani	Slalom	44.42	9	44.70	6	1:29.12	5
Maria Rosa Quario	Slalom	43.63	6	44.29	4	1:27.92	4

== Biathlon ==
Men

Event	Athlete	Misses ^{1}	Time	Rank
10 km Sprint	Arduino Tiraboschi	3	36:39.98	31
10 km Sprint	Adriano Darioli	5	36:14.17	25
10 km Sprint	Luigi Weiss	3	35:37.72	18

Event	Athlete	Time	Penalties	Adjusted time ^{2}	Rank
20 km	Angelo Carrara	1'12:31.89	3	1'15:31.89	21
20 km	Adriano Darioli	1'10:11.22	5	1'15:11.22	19
20 km	Arduino Tiraboschi	1'11:06.05	2	1'13:06.05	10

Men's 4 x 7.5 km relay

Athletes	Race		
Athletes	Misses ^{1}	Time	Rank
Arduino Tiraboschi; Adriano Darioli; Celestino Midali; Luigi Weiss	2	1'40:20.79	9

^{1} A penalty loop of 150 metres had to be skied per missed target.
^{2} One minute added per close miss (a hit in the outer ring), two minutes added per complete miss.

== Bobsleigh ==
Sled	Athletes	Event	Run 1		Run 2		Run 3		Run 4		Total	
Sled	Athletes	Event	Time	Rank	Time	Rank	Time	Rank	Time	Rank	Time	Rank
ITA-1	Andrea Jory; Edmund Lanziner	Two-man	1:03.73	11	1:04.19	11	1:03.97	15	1:04.45	16	4:16.34	14
ITA-2	Giuseppe Soravia; Georg Werth	Two-man	1:04.75	19	1:04.81	18	1:04.30	16	1:04.31	15	4:18.17	16

Sled	Athletes	Event	Run 1		Run 2		Run 3		Run 4		Total	
Sled	Athletes	Event	Time	Rank	Time	Rank	Time	Rank	Time	Rank	Time	Rank
ITA-1	Andrea Jory; Edmund Lanziner; Georg Werth; Giovanni Modena	Four-man	1:01.26	9	1:01.66	12	1:01.01	12	1:01.37	10	4:05.30	11

== Cross-country skiing ==
Men

Event	Athlete	Race	
Event	Athlete	Time	Rank
15 km	Giampaolo Rupil	DNF	–
15 km	Giulio Capitanio	45:10.40	39
15 km	Giorgio Vanzetta	44:52.18	34
15 km	Maurilio De Zolt	44:43.19	31
30 km	Roberto Primus	1'37:55.47	43
30 km	Benedetto Carrara	1'34:27.45	34
30 km	Giulio Capitanio	1'33:07.48	27
30 km	Maurilio De Zolt	1'31:43.74	20
50 km	Maurilio De Zolt	DNF	–
50 km	Gianfranco Polvara	2'41:51.58	32
50 km	Roberto Primus	2'38:10.10	25
50 km	Giulio Capitanio	2'37:01.40	19

Men's 4 × 10 km relay

Athletes	Race	
Athletes	Time	Rank
Maurilio De Zolt; Benedetto Carrara; Giulio Capitanio; Giorgio Vanzetta	2'01:09.93	6

== Figure skating ==
Women

Athlete	CF	SP	FS	Points	Places	Rank
Franca Bianconi	19	18	19	144.82	134	19
Susanna Driano	6	14	10	172.82	77	8

== Luge ==
Men

Athlete	Run 1		Run 2		Run 3		Run 4		Total	
Athlete	Time	Rank	Time	Rank	Time	Rank	Time	Rank	Time	Rank
Karl Brunner	DNF	–	–	–	–	–	–	–	DNF	–
Paul Hildgartner	43.652	5	44.000	4	43.708	2	44.012	3	2:55.372	2nd place, silver medalist(s)
Ernst Haspinger	43.435	2	43.833	3	43.592	1	52.556	23	3:03.416	21

(Men's) Doubles

Athletes	Run 1		Run 2		Total	
Athletes	Time	Rank	Time	Rank	Time	Rank
Peter Gschnitzer; Karl Brunner	39.549	3	40.057	3	1:19.606	2nd place, silver medalist(s)
Hansjörg Raffl; Alfred Silginer	39.823	5	40.153	6	1:19.976	5

Women

Athlete	Run 1		Run 2		Run 3		Run 4		Total	
Athlete	Time	Rank	Time	Rank	Time	Rank	Time	Rank	Time	Rank
Monika Auer	40.590	17	40.319	11	41.269	21	40.855	16	2:43.033	16
Angelika Aukenthaler	39.829	12	41.043	20	39.919	11	39.860	9	2:40.651	11
Maria Luise Rainer	39.695	10	40.948	18	1:13.062	24	DNF	–	DNF	–

== Ski jumping ==
Athlete	Event	Jump 1		Jump 2		Total	
Athlete	Event	Distance	Points	Distance	Points	Points	Rank
Lido Tomasi	Normal hill	72.0	93.4	74.0	99.1	182.5	38
Lido Tomasi	Large hill	87.5	83.2	88.0	85.9	169.1	46

== Speed skating ==
Men

Event	Athlete	Race	
Event	Athlete	Time	Rank
500 m	Giovanni Paganin	40.42	28
1000 m	Giovanni Paganin	1:21.50	28
1500 m	Maurizio Marchetto	2:07.45	28
5000 m	Maurizio Marchetto	7:35.50	23
10,000 m	Maurizio Marchetto	15:56.73	22

Women

Event	Athlete	Race	
Event	Athlete	Time	Rank
500 m	Marzia Peretti	DNF	–
1000 m	Marzia Peretti	1:35.66	36

== See also ==
- Italy at the FIS Alpine World Ski Championships 1980
