= Luge at the 1980 Winter Olympics – Doubles =

Doubles at the XIII Olympic Winter Games
- Venue: Mt. Van Hoevenberg Olympic Bobsled Run
- Dates: 19 February 1980
- Competitors: 38 from 12 nations
- Winning time: 1:19.331

Medalists
1st place, gold medalist(s)		East Germany; Hans Rinn, Norbert Hahn
2nd place, silver medalist(s)		Italy; Peter Gschnitzer, Karl Brunner
3rd place, bronze medalist(s)		Austria; Georg Fluckinger, Karl Schrott

The Doubles luge competition at the 1980 Winter Olympics in Lake Placid was held on 19 February, at Mt. Van Hoevenberg Olympic Bobsled Run. The doubles team of Hans Rinn and Norbert Hahn became the first repeat winners of an Olympic luge event.

== Results ==
Rank	Athletes	Country	Run 1	Run 2	Total
1st place, gold medalist(s)	Hans Rinn; Norbert Hahn	East Germany	39.303	40.028	1:19.331
2nd place, silver medalist(s)	Peter Gschnitzer; Karl Brunner	Italy	39.549	40.057	1:19.606
3rd place, bronze medalist(s)	Georg Fluckinger; Karl Schrott	Austria	39.509	40.286	1:19.795
4	Bernd Hahn; Ulli Hahn	East Germany	39.972	39.942	1:19.914
5	Hansjörg Raffl; Alfred Silginer	Italy	39.823	40.153	1:19.976
6	Anton Winkler; Anton Wembacher	West Germany	39.916	40.096	1:20.012
7	Hans Brandner; Balthasar Schwarm	West Germany	39.814	40.249	1:20.063
8	Jindřich Zeman; Vladimír Resl	Czechoslovakia	40.050	40.092	1:20.142
9	Günther Lemmerer; Reinhold Sulzbacher	Austria	40.017	40.486	1:20.503
10	Dainis Bremze; Aigars Krikis	Soviet Union	40.164	40.498	1:20.662
11	Richard Healey; Ty Danco	United States	40.386	40.955	1:21.341
12	Stefan Kjernholm; Kenneth Holm	Sweden	40.415	41.024	1:21.439
13	Koji Kuriyama; Takashi Takagi	Japan	41.035	41.499	1:22.534
14	Derek Prentice; Christopher Dyason	Great Britain	40.705	41.862	1:22.567
15	Ioan Apostol; Cristinel Piciorea	Romania	40.757	41.909	1:22.666
16	Wolfgang Schädler; Rainer Gassner	Liechtenstein	40.829	42.566	1:23.395
17	Valery Yakushin; Sergey Danilin	Soviet Union	39.951	45.193	1:25.144
18	Frank Masley; Ray Bateman Jr.	United States	48.241	40.612	1:28.853
19	Jeremy Palmer-Tomkinson; John Denby	Great Britain	42.406	48.493	1:30.899
