= Prinoth =

Prinoth may refer to:

- Prinoth (company), a snow groomer manufacturer

== People with the surname ==
- Ernesto Prinoth, Italian racing driver
- Nadia Prinoth, Italian luger
