= John Denby =

John Denby may refer to:

- James Denby, mistakenly listed as John, English footballer
- John Denby (luger), British luger
- John Denby (MP for Wallingford), in 1419 and 1426, MP for Wallingford (UK Parliament constituency)
- John Denby (MP for Ludgershall), in 1421 and 1423, MP for Ludgershall (UK Parliament constituency)
