= Sivec (surname) =

Sivec is a Slovenian surname. Notable people with the surname include:

- Ivan Sivec (born 23 May 1949) is a Slovenian writer, author, lyricist, and storyteller
- Leopold Sivec (born 3 August 1958) is an Austrian ice hockey player
