= Timothy Nardiello =

American luger

Personal information
- Born: October 5, 1960 (age 65) Lake Placid, New York, United States

Sport
- Sport: Luge

Timothy Nardiello (born October 5, 1960) is an American former luger and coach. He competed at the 1984 Winter Olympics and the 1988 Winter Olympics. He later went on to coach the US national skeleton team.

== Biography ==
Nardiello was born in Lake Placid, New York, in 1960. At high school, Nardiello played hockey, and was on the team that won the New York State Championship. He took up luge, while working in a variety of jobs, including carpentry and fishing. In 1986, Nardiello and Miro Zajonc became the first team from America to win a medal at a Luge World Cup race, finishing in second place.

At the 1984 Winter Olympics in Sarajevo, Nardiello competed in the men's singles event, finishing in 21st place. Four years later, Frank Masley and Nardiello were the first two to qualify to the American Olympic luge team following their qualification runs at the US national trials. At the 1988 Winter Olympics in Calgary, Nardiello and Miro Zajonc competed in the doubles event, where they finished in eleventh place.

Following his luge career, Nardiello became the coach of the US skeleton team. However, just prior to the 2006 Winter Olympics in Turin, Nardiello was fired from the team. Initially, he had been accused of the sexual harassment of members of the skeleton team. After no supporting evidence was found for the claims against him, he was reinstated a few weeks later. Despite this, the US Olympic Committee then fired Nardiello after they had found he was still working as a coach while under suspension.
