= Bachev =

Bachev may refer to:

- Bachev, Ukraine, or Bachiv, a village in Lviv Raion, Ukraine
- Georgi Bachev (born 1977), Bulgarian footballer and manager
- Mitko Bachev (born 1960), Bulgarian luger
- Viktor Bachev (born 1877), Bulgarian Exorcist
- Radoslav Bachev (born 1981), Bulgarian footballer
- Stanislav Bachev (born 1981), Bulgarian footballer
- Ada Bachev (born 2009), Bulgarian
