= Luge World Cup =

International Luge Federation season-long competition

The Luge World Cup season is a yearly competition first organized by the International Luge Federation since 1977–78. The World Cup is the highest level season-long competition in the sport.

== Men's singles ==
Season	Winner	Runner-up	Third
1977–78	Anton Winkler (FRG)	Paul Hildgartner (ITA)	Gerd Böhmer (FRG)
1977–78	Anton Winkler (FRG)	Paul Hildgartner (ITA)	Manfred Schmid (AUT)
1978–79	Paul Hildgartner (ITA)	Hansjörg Raffl (ITA)	Karl Brunner (ITA)
1979–80	Ernst Haspinger (ITA)	Karl Brunner (ITA)	Georg Fluckinger (AUT)
1980–81	Ernst Haspinger (ITA)	none awarded	Karl Brunner (ITA)
1980–81	Paul Hildgartner (ITA)	none awarded	Karl Brunner (ITA)
1981–82	Ernst Haspinger (ITA) (3)	Sergey Danilin (URS)	Michael Walter (GDR)
1982–83	Paul Hildgartner (ITA) (3)	Sergey Danilin (URS)	Ernst Haspinger (ITA)
1983–84	Michael Walter (GDR)	Norbert Huber (ITA)	Yuri Kharchenko (URS)
1984–85	Norbert Huber (ITA)	Markus Prock (AUT)	Gerhard Sandbichler (AUT)
1984–85	Norbert Huber (ITA)	Markus Prock (AUT)	Wolfgang Schädler (LIE)
1985–86	Norbert Huber (ITA)	Johannes Schettel (FRG)	Paul Hildgartner (ITA)
1986–87	Norbert Huber (ITA) (3)	Rene Friedl (GDR)	Paul Hildgartner (ITA)
1986–87	Norbert Huber (ITA) (3)	Rene Friedl (GDR)	Markus Prock (AUT)
1987–88	Markus Prock (AUT)	Yuri Kharchenko (URS)	Jens Müller (GDR)
1988–89	Georg Hackl (FRG)	Jens Müller (GDR)	Johannes Schettel (FRG)
1989–90	Georg Hackl (FRG) (2)	Markus Prock (AUT)	Norbert Huber (ITA)
1990–91	Markus Prock (AUT)	Georg Hackl (GER)	Jens Müller (GER)
1991–92	Markus Prock (AUT)	Duncan Kennedy (USA)	Georg Hackl (GER)
1992–93	Markus Prock (AUT)	Georg Hackl (GER)	Duncan Kennedy (USA)
1993–94	Markus Prock (AUT)	Duncan Kennedy (USA)	Georg Hackl (GER)
1994–95	Markus Prock (AUT)	Armin Zöggeler (ITA)	Jens Müller (GER)
1995–96	Markus Prock (AUT)	Armin Zöggeler (ITA)	Georg Hackl (GER)
1996–97	Markus Prock (AUT)	Jens Müller (GER)	Wilfried Huber (ITA)
1997–98	Armin Zöggeler (ITA)	Norbert Huber (ITA)	Gerhard Gleirscher (AUT)
1998–99	Markus Prock (AUT)	Georg Hackl (GER)	Jens Müller (GER)
1999–2000	Armin Zöggeler (ITA)	Jens Müller (GER)	Georg Hackl (GER)
2000–01	Armin Zöggeler (ITA)	Georg Hackl (GER)	Markus Prock (AUT)
2001–02	Markus Prock (AUT) (10)	Armin Zöggeler (ITA)	Georg Hackl (GER)
2002–03	Markus Kleinheinz (AUT)	Georg Hackl (GER)	Armin Zöggeler (ITA)
2003–04	Armin Zöggeler (ITA)	Georg Hackl (GER)	David Möller (GER)
2004–05	Albert Demchenko (RUS)	Georg Hackl (GER)	Markus Kleinheinz (AUT)
2004–05	Albert Demchenko (RUS)	Georg Hackl (GER)	David Möller (GER)
2005–06	Armin Zöggeler (ITA)	David Möller (GER)	Tony Benshoof (USA)
2006–07	Armin Zöggeler (ITA)	David Möller (GER)	Reinhold Rainer (ITA)
2007–08	Armin Zöggeler (ITA)	David Möller (GER)	Albert Demchenko (RUS)
2008–09	Armin Zöggeler (ITA)	David Möller (GER)	Jan Eichhorn (GER)
2009–10	Armin Zöggeler (ITA)	Albert Demchenko (RUS)	Felix Loch (GER)
2010–11	Armin Zöggeler (ITA) (10)	Felix Loch (GER)	Albert Demchenko (RUS)
2011–12	Felix Loch (GER)	Andi Langenhan (GER)	David Möller (GER)
2012–13	Felix Loch (GER)	Andi Langenhan (GER)	David Möller (GER)
2013–14	Felix Loch (GER)	Armin Zöggeler (ITA)	Dominik Fischnaller (ITA)
2014–15	Felix Loch (GER)	Andi Langenhan (GER)	Wolfgang Kindl (AUT)
2015–16	Felix Loch (GER)	Wolfgang Kindl (AUT)	Chris Mazdzer (USA)
2016–17	Roman Repilov (RUS)	Felix Loch (GER)	Wolfgang Kindl (AUT)
2017–18	Felix Loch (GER)	Wolfgang Kindl (AUT)	Roman Repilov (RUS)
2018–19	Semen Pavlichenko (RUS)	Roman Repilov (RUS)	Felix Loch (GER)
2019–20	Roman Repilov (RUS) (2)	Dominik Fischnaller (ITA)	Semen Pavlichenko (RUS)
2020–21	Felix Loch (GER)	Johannes Ludwig (GER)	Semen Pavlichenko (RUS)
2021–22	Johannes Ludwig (GER)	Wolfgang Kindl (AUT)	Kristers Aparjods (LAT)
2021–22	Johannes Ludwig (GER)	Wolfgang Kindl (AUT)	Felix Loch (GER)
2022–23	Dominik Fischnaller (ITA)	Felix Loch (GER)	Max Langenhan (GER)
2023–24	Max Langenhan (GER)	Kristers Aparjods (LAT)	Felix Loch (GER)
2024–25	Max Langenhan (GER) (2)	Nico Gleirscher (AUT)	Felix Loch (GER)
2025–26	Felix Loch (GER) (8)	Jonas Müller (AUT)	Max Langenhan (GER)

Medals

Rank	Nation	Gold	Silver	Bronze	Total
1	Italy	20	10	10	40
2	Germany	11	20	20	51
3	Austria	11	7	9	27
4	Russia	4	2	5	11
5	West Germany	3	1	2	6
6	East Germany	1	2	2	5
7	Soviet Union	0	3	1	4
8	United States	0	2	3	5
9	Latvia	0	1	1	2
10	Liechtenstein	0	0	1	1
Totals (10 entries)		50	48	54	152

World Cup Stages medals (as of 2022/23)

Rank	Country	First podium	Most recent	Podium sweeps	Gold	Silver	Bronze	Total
1	Germany	1991	2023	21	119	116	109	344
2	Italy	1978	2023	8	99	74	86	259
3	Austria	1979	2023	3	56	55	76	187
4	Russia	1998	2022	1	38	46	21	105
5	East Germany	1978	1990	4	17	21	15	53
6	West Germany	2012	1990		11	7	9	27
7	United States	1986	2020		10	26	20	56
8	Soviet Union	1981	1990		7	6	6	19
9	Latvia	1992	2023		3	6	11	20
10	Canada	1983	2018		1	3	4	8
11	Sweden	1980	1980		1	0	0	1
12	Slovakia	2018	2018		0	1	0	1
13	Switzerland	2007	2014		0	0	4	4
14	Czechoslovakia	1982	1982		0	0	1	1
14	France	2001	2001		0	0	1	1

World Cup races

Rank	Athlete	Country	From	To	Gold	Silver	Bronze	Total
1	Armin Zöggeler	Italy	1993	2014	57	26	26	103
2	Felix Loch	Germany	2009	2023	50	21	21	92
3	Georg Hackl	West Germany; Germany	1985	2006	34	18	18	71
4	Markus Prock	Austria	1984	2002	33	17	23	73
5	Albert Demchenko	Russia	1998	2014	15	12	12	39
6	Semen Pavlichenko	Russia	2015	2021	13	11	0	24
7	Paul Hildgartner	Italy	1978	1987	11	7	4	22
8	David Möller	Germany	2002	2014	10	23	24	57
9	Jens Müller	East Germany; Germany	1985	2001	10	23	7	40
10	Wolfgang Kindl	Austria	2014	2023	10	11	13	34

Notes:

- Georg Hackl from West Germany also won 3 gold, 5 silver, and 8 bronze competing in doubles in 1985–1990.
- Albert Demchenko from Russia also won 1 silver and 1 bronze competing in doubles in 1992–1993.

== Women's singles ==
Season	Winner	Runner-up	Third
1977–78	Regina König (FRG)	Andrea Fendt (FRG)	Angelika Schafferer (AUT)
1977–78	Regina König (FRG)	Andrea Fendt (FRG)	Margit Schumann (GDR)
1977–78	Regina König (FRG)	Andrea Fendt (FRG)	Roswitha Stenzel (GDR)
1978–79	Angelika Schafferer (AUT)	Marie-Luise Rainer (ITA)	Christine Brunner (AUT)
1979–80	Angelika Schafferer (AUT)	Bettina Schmidt (GDR)	Christine Brunner (AUT)
1980–81	Angelika Schafferer (AUT) (3)	Monika Auer (ITA)	Marie-Luise Rainer (ITA)
1981–82	Vera Zozulya (URS)	Marie-Luise Rainer (ITA)	Monika Auer (ITA)
1982–83	Ute Weiß (GDR)	Ingrida Amantova (URS)	Melitta Sollmann (GDR)
1983–84	Steffi Martin (GDR)	none awarded	Ute Weiß (GDR)
1983–84	Bettina Schmidt (GDR)	none awarded	Ute Weiß (GDR)
1984–85	Cerstin Schmidt (GDR)	Ute Oberhoffner (GDR)	Marie-Luise Rainer (ITA)
1985–86	Marie-Luise Rainer (ITA)	Cerstin Schmidt (GDR)	Ute Oberhoffner (GDR)
1986–87	Cerstin Schmidt (GDR) (2)	Marie-Luise Rainer (ITA)	Gabriele Kohlisch (GDR)
1986–87	Cerstin Schmidt (GDR) (2)	Marie-Luise Rainer (ITA)	Bonny Warner (USA)
1987–88	Yuliya Antipova (URS)	Marie-Luise Rainer (ITA)	Gabriele Kohlisch (GDR)
1988–89	Ute Oberhoffner (GDR) (2)	Gerda Weissensteiner (ITA)	Yuliya Antipova (URS)
1989–90	Yuliya Antipova (URS) (2)	Gerda Weissensteiner (ITA)	Jana Bode (FRG)
1990–91	Susi Erdmann (GER)	Gerda Weissensteiner (ITA)	Gabriele Kohlisch (GER)
1991–92	Susi Erdmann (GER) (2)	Cammy Myler (USA)	Gabriele Kohlisch (GER)
1991–92	Susi Erdmann (GER) (2)	Cammy Myler (USA)	Doris Neuner (AUT)
1992–93	Gerda Weissensteiner (ITA)	Doris Neuner (AUT)	Andrea Tagwerker (AUT)
1993–94	Gabriele Kohlisch (GER)	Jana Bode (GER)	Susi Erdmann (GER)
1993–94	Gabriele Kohlisch (GER)	Jana Bode (GER)	Andrea Tagwerker (AUT)
1994–95	Sylke Otto (GER)	Gabriele Kohlisch (GER)	Jana Bode (GER)
1995–96	Jana Bode (GER)	Gerda Weissensteiner (ITA)	Gabriele Kohlisch (GER)
1996–97	Andrea Tagwerker (AUT)	Angelika Neuner (AUT)	Jana Bode (GER)
1997–98	Gerda Weissensteiner (ITA) (2)	Silke Kraushaar (GER)	Cammy Myler (USA)
1998–99	Silke Kraushaar (GER)	Sylke Otto (GER)	Barbara Niedernhuber (GER)
1999–2000	Sylke Otto (GER)	Silke Kraushaar (GER)	Barbara Niedernhuber (GER)
2000–01	Silke Kraushaar (GER)	Sylke Otto (GER)	Angelika Neuner (AUT)
2001–02	Silke Kraushaar (GER)	Sylke Otto (GER)	Barbara Niedernhuber (GER)
2002–03	Sylke Otto (GER)	Silke Kraushaar (GER)	Barbara Niedernhuber (GER)
2003–04	Sylke Otto (GER) (4)	Silke Kraushaar (GER)	Barbara Niedernhuber (GER)
2004–05	Barbara Niedernhuber (GER)	Silke Kraushaar (GER)	Sylke Otto (GER)
2005–06	Silke Kraushaar (GER)	Sylke Otto (GER)	Tatjana Hüfner (GER)
2006–07	Silke Kraushaar-Pielach (GER) (5)	Tatjana Hüfner (GER)	Anke Wischnewski (GER)
2007–08	Tatjana Hüfner (GER)	Silke Kraushaar-Pielach (GER)	Natalie Geisenberger (GER)
2008–09	Tatjana Hüfner (GER)	Natalie Geisenberger (GER)	Anke Wischnewski (GER)
2009–10	Tatjana Hüfner (GER)	Natalie Geisenberger (GER)	Anke Wischnewski (GER)
2010–11	Tatjana Hüfner (GER)	Natalie Geisenberger (GER)	Anke Wischnewski (GER)
2011–12	Tatjana Hüfner (GER) (5)	Natalie Geisenberger (GER)	Anke Wischnewski (GER)
2012–13	Natalie Geisenberger (GER)	Anke Wischnewski (GER)	Tatjana Hüfner (GER)
2013–14	Natalie Geisenberger (GER)	Alex Gough (CAN)	Tatjana Hüfner (GER)
2014–15	Natalie Geisenberger (GER)	Dajana Eitberger (GER)	Tatjana Hüfner (GER)
2015–16	Natalie Geisenberger (GER)	Tatiana Ivanova (RUS)	Tatjana Hüfner (GER)
2016–17	Natalie Geisenberger (GER)	Tatjana Hüfner (GER)	Tatiana Ivanova (RUS)
2017–18	Natalie Geisenberger (GER)	Dajana Eitberger (GER)	Summer Britcher (USA)
2018–19	Natalie Geisenberger (GER)	Julia Taubitz (GER)	Summer Britcher (USA)
2019–20	Julia Taubitz (GER)	Tatiana Ivanova (RUS)	Victoria Demchenko (RUS)
2020–21	Natalie Geisenberger (GER) (8)	Julia Taubitz (GER)	Dajana Eitberger (GER)
2021–22	Julia Taubitz (GER)	Madeleine Egle (AUT)	Natalie Geisenberger (GER)
2022–23	Julia Taubitz (GER)	Dajana Eitberger (GER)	Anna Berreiter (GER)
2023–24	Julia Taubitz (GER)	Anna Berreiter (GER)	Madeleine Egle (AUT)
2024–25	Julia Taubitz (GER)	Madeleine Egle (AUT)	Lisa Schulte (AUT)
2025–26	Julia Taubitz (GER) (6)	Merle Fräbel (GER)	Lisa Schulte (AUT)

Medals

Rank	Nation	Gold	Silver	Bronze	Total
1	Germany	33	26	26	85
2	East Germany	6	3	7	16
3	Austria	4	4	10	18
4	Italy	3	9	3	15
5	Soviet Union	3	1	1	5
6	West Germany	1	1	1	3
7	Russia	0	2	2	4
8	United States	0	1	4	5
9	Canada	0	1	0	1
Totals (9 entries)		50	48	54	152

World Cup Stages medals (as of 2022/23)

Rank	Country	First podium	Most recent	Podium sweeps	Gold	Silver	Bronze	Total
1	Germany	1991	2023	113	231	212	174	617
2	East Germany	1978	1990	10	36	33	23	92
3	Italy	1979	2020		22	17	21	60
4	Austria	1978	2023		21	25	48	94
5	Russia	2011	2022		18	11	19	48
6	United States	1987	2023	1	16	24	24	64
7	Soviet Union	1978	1991	2	8	13	17	38
8	West Germany	1978	1990	1	5	4	4	13
9	Canada	1988	2019		4	11	19	34
10	Latvia	1992	2023		2	8	10	20
11	Czechoslovakia	1981	1986		2	2	1	5
12	Ukraine	1995	2009		0	3	5	8
13	Sweden	1979	1979		0	0	1	1
13	Switzerland	2021	2021		0	0	1	1

World Cup races

Rank	Athlete	Country	From	To	Gold	Silver	Bronze	Total
1	Natalie Geisenberger	Germany	2007	2022	52	49	17	118
2	Sylke Otto	East Germany; Germany	1990	2007	38	26	8	72
3	Tatjana Hüfner	Germany	2004	2019	37	31	12	80
4	Silke Kraushaar	Germany	1992	2008	26	27	14	77
5	Julia Taubitz	Germany	2017	2023	21	14	11	46
6	Tatiana Ivanova	Russia	2011	2022	17	7	10	34
7	Gabriele Kohlisch	East Germany; Germany	1985	1996	13	9	11	33
8	Gerda Weißensteiner	Italy	1987	1998	13	8	8	29
9	Jana Bode	West Germany; Germany	1990	1997	11	11	6	28
10	Dajana Eitberger	Germany	2014	2023	10	9	20	39

== Men's doubles ==
Season	Winner	Runner-up	Third
1977–78	Italy; Peter Gschnitzer; Karl Brunner	West Germany; Hans Brandner; Balthasar Schwarm	West Germany; Stefan Hölzlwimmer; Rudolf Grosswang
1978–79	Italy; Peter Gschnitzer (2); Karl Brunner (2)	Austria; Georg Fluckinger; Karl Schrott	West Germany; Hans Brandner; Balthasar Schwarm
1979–80	Austria; Günther Lemmerer; Reinhold Sulzbacher	Austria; Georg Fluckinger; Karl Schrott	Italy; Peter Gschnitzer; Karl Brunner
1980–81	Austria; Günther Lemmerer; Reinhold Sulzbacher	Italy; Hansjörg Raffl; Karl Brunner	West Germany; Hans Stangassinger; Franz Wembacher
1981–82	Austria; Günther Lemmerer (3); Reinhold Sulzbacher (3)	Austria; Georg Fluckinger; Franz Wilhelmer	Soviet Union; Juris Eisaks; Einārs Veikša
1982–83	Italy; Hansjörg Raffl; Norbert Huber	West Germany; Hans Stangassinger; Franz Wembacher	West Germany; Thomas Schwab; Wolfgang Staudinger
1983–84	East Germany; Jörg Hoffmann; Jochen Pietzsch	Austria; Georg Fluckinger; Franz Wilhelmer	none awarded
1983–84	East Germany; Jörg Hoffmann; Jochen Pietzsch	Italy; Hansjörg Raffl; Norbert Huber	none awarded
1984–85	Italy; Hansjörg Raffl; Norbert Huber	Austria; Georg Fluckinger; Franz Wilhelmer	East Germany; René Keller; Lutz Kühnlenz
1985–86	Italy; Hansjörg Raffl; Norbert Huber	West Germany; Thomas Schwab; Wolfgang Staudinger	West Germany; Stefan Ilsanker; Georg Hackl
1986–87	West Germany; Thomas Schwab; Wolfgang Staudinger	West Germany; Stefan Ilsanker; Georg Hackl	Italy; Hansjörg Raffl; Norbert Huber
1987–88	Soviet Union; Yevgeny Belousov; Aleksandr Belyakov	West Germany; Stefan Ilsanker; Georg Hackl	Italy; Hansjörg Raffl; Norbert Huber
1987–88	Soviet Union; Yevgeny Belousov; Aleksandr Belyakov	West Germany; Stefan Ilsanker; Georg Hackl	Soviet Union; Vitaliy Melnik; Dimitriy Alekseyev
1988–89	Italy; Hansjörg Raffl; Norbert Huber	East Germany; Stefan Krauße; Jan Behrendt	East Germany; Jörg Hoffmann; Jochen Pietzsch
1989–90	Italy; Hansjörg Raffl; Norbert Huber	Italy; Kurt Brugger; Wilfried Huber	West Germany; Stefan Ilsanker; Georg Hackl
1990–91	Italy; Hansjörg Raffl; Norbert Huber	Germany; Stefan Krauße; Jan Behrendt	Italy; Kurt Brugger; Wilfried Huber
1991–92	Italy; Hansjörg Raffl; Norbert Huber	Germany; Yves Mankel; Thomas Rudolph	Germany; Stefan Krauße; Jan Behrendt
1992–93	Italy; Hansjörg Raffl (8); Norbert Huber (8)	Italy; Kurt Brugger; Wilfried Huber	Germany; Stefan Krauße; Jan Behrendt
1993–94	Germany; Stefan Krauße; Jan Behrendt	Austria; Tobias Schiegl; Markus Schiegl	Germany; Steffen Skel; Steffen Wöller
1994–95	Germany; Stefan Krauße; Jan Behrendt	Italy; Kurt Brugger; Wilfried Huber	United States; Chris Thorpe; Gordy Sheer
1995–96	Germany; Stefan Krauße (3); Jan Behrendt (3)	Germany; Yves Mankel; Thomas Rudolph	United States; Chris Thorpe; Gordy Sheer
1996–97	United States; Chris Thorpe; Gordy Sheer	Italy; Gerhard Plankensteiner; Oswald Haselrieder	Austria; Tobias Schiegl; Markus Schiegl
1997–98	United States; Mark Grimmette; Brian Martin	Italy; Kurt Brugger; Wilfried Huber	Italy; Gerhard Plankensteiner; Oswald Haselrieder
1998–99	United States; Mark Grimmette; Brian Martin	Austria; Tobias Schiegl; Markus Schiegl	Germany; Patric Leitner; Alexander Resch
1999–2000	Germany; Patric Leitner; Alexander Resch	Germany; Steffen Skel; Steffen Wöller	United States; Mark Grimmette; Brian Martin
2000–01	Germany; Steffen Skel; Steffen Wöller	Germany; André Florschütz; Torsten Wustlich	Germany; Patric Leitner; Alexander Resch
2001–02	Germany; Patric Leitner; Alexander Resch	Germany; Steffen Skel; Steffen Wöller	Austria; Tobias Schiegl; Markus Schiegl
2002–03	United States; Mark Grimmette (3); Brian Martin (3)	Germany; Patric Leitner; Alexander Resch	Austria; Tobias Schiegl; Markus Schiegl
2003–04	Germany; Patric Leitner; Alexander Resch	Germany; André Florschütz; Torsten Wustlich	Italy; Christian Oberstolz; Patrick Gruber
2004–05	Italy; Christian Oberstolz; Patrick Gruber	Germany; André Florschütz; Torsten Wustlich	Austria; Andreas Linger; Wolfgang Linger
2005–06	Germany; Patric Leitner; Alexander Resch	Italy; Christian Oberstolz; Patrick Gruber	Germany; André Florschütz; Torsten Wustlich
2006–07	Germany; Patric Leitner; Alexander Resch	Italy; Christian Oberstolz; Patrick Gruber	Italy; Gerhard Plankensteiner; Oswald Haselrieder
2007–08	Germany; Patric Leitner (6); Alexander Resch (6)	Italy; Christian Oberstolz; Patrick Gruber	Austria; Andreas Linger; Wolfgang Linger
2008–09	Italy; Christian Oberstolz (2); Patrick Gruber (2)	Germany; Patric Leitner; Alexander Resch	Austria; Andreas Linger; Wolfgang Linger
2009–10	Germany; André Florschütz; Torsten Wustlich	Germany; Patric Leitner; Alexander Resch	Italy; Christian Oberstolz; Patrick Gruber
2010–11	Germany; Tobias Wendl; Tobias Arlt	Austria; Andreas Linger; Wolfgang Linger	Italy; Christian Oberstolz; Patrick Gruber
2011–12	Austria; Andreas Linger; Wolfgang Linger	Germany; Tobias Wendl; Tobias Arlt	Germany; Toni Eggert; Sascha Benecken
2012–13	Germany; Tobias Wendl; Tobias Arlt	Germany; Toni Eggert; Sascha Benecken	Austria; Peter Penz; Georg Fischler
2013–14	Germany; Tobias Wendl; Tobias Arlt	Germany; Toni Eggert; Sascha Benecken	Italy; Christian Oberstolz; Patrick Gruber
2014–15	Germany; Toni Eggert; Sascha Benecken	Germany; Tobias Wendl; Tobias Arlt	Latvia; Andris Šics; Juris Šics
2015–16	Germany; Tobias Wendl; Tobias Arlt	Germany; Toni Eggert; Sascha Benecken	Austria; Peter Penz; Georg Fischler
2016–17	Germany; Toni Eggert; Sascha Benecken	Germany; Tobias Wendl; Tobias Arlt	United States; Matt Mortensen; Jayson Terdiman
2017–18	Germany; Toni Eggert; Sascha Benecken	Germany; Tobias Wendl; Tobias Arlt	Austria; Peter Penz; Georg Fischler
2018–19	Germany; Toni Eggert; Sascha Benecken	Austria; Thomas Steu; Lorenz Koller	Germany; Tobias Wendl; Tobias Arlt
2019–20	Germany; Toni Eggert; Sascha Benecken	Germany; Tobias Wendl; Tobias Arlt	Latvia; Andris Šics; Juris Šics
2020–21	Austria; Thomas Steu; Lorenz Koller	Latvia; Andris Šics; Juris Šics	Germany; Toni Eggert; Sascha Benecken
2021–22	Germany; Toni Eggert (6); Sascha Benecken (6)	Latvia; Andris Šics; Juris Šics	Germany; Tobias Wendl; Tobias Arlt
2022–23	Germany; Tobias Wendl; Tobias Arlt	Germany; Toni Eggert; Sascha Benecken	Latvia; Mārtiņš Bots; Roberts Plūme
2023–24	Austria; Thomas Steu (2); Wolfgang Kindl	Germany; Tobias Wendl; Tobias Arlt	Latvia; Mārtiņš Bots; Roberts Plūme
2024–25	Germany; Tobias Wendl; Tobias Arlt	Latvia; Mārtiņš Bots; Roberts Plūme	Austria; Thomas Steu; Wolfgang Kindl
2025–26	Germany; Tobias Wendl (7); Tobias Arlt (7)	Austria; Thomas Steu; Wolfgang Kindl	Austria; Juri Gatt; Riccardo Schöpf

Medals

Rank	Nation	Gold	Silver	Bronze	Total
1	Germany	24	21	10	55
2	Italy	12	10	10	32
3	Austria	6	10	11	27
4	United States	4	0	4	8
5	West Germany	1	5	6	12
6	East Germany	1	1	2	4
7	Soviet Union	1	0	2	3
8	Latvia	0	3	4	7
Totals (8 entries)		49	50	49	148

== Women's doubles ==
Season	Winner	Runner-up	Third
2022–23	Italy; Andrea Vötter; Marion Oberhofer	Austria; Selina Egle; Lara Kipp	Germany; Jessica Degenhardt; Cheyenne Rosenthal
2023–24	Italy; Andrea Vötter (2); Marion Oberhofer (2)	Germany; Jessica Degenhardt; Cheyenne Rosenthal	Germany; Dajana Eitberger; Saskia Schirmer
2024–25	Austria; Selina Egle; Lara Kipp	Germany; Jessica Degenhardt; Cheyenne Rosenthal	United States; Chevonne Forgan; Sophia Kirkby
2025–26	Austria; Selina Egle (2); Lara Kipp (2)	Germany; Dajana Eitberger; Magdalena Matschina	Germany; Jessica Degenhardt; Cheyenne Rosenthal

Medals

Rank	Nation	Gold	Silver	Bronze	Total
1	Austria	2	1	0	3
2	Italy	2	0	0	2
3	Germany	0	3	3	6
4	United States	0	0	1	1
Totals (4 entries)		4	4	4	12

== Team World Cup ==
Season	Winner	Runner-up	Third
2003–04	Germany	Italy	Austria
2004–05	Germany	Italy	United States
2005–06	Italy	Austria	none awarded
2005–06	Italy	Germany	none awarded
2005–06	Italy	United States	none awarded
2006–07	Canada	United States	Germany
2007–08	Germany	United States	Austria
2008–09	Germany	Austria	United States
2009–10	Germany	Austria	Canada
2010–11	Germany	Italy	Russia
2011–12	Germany	Canada	Russia
2012–13	Germany	Italy	United States
2013–14	Germany	Canada	United States
2014–15	Germany	Russia	United States
2015–16	Germany	Russia	United States
2016–17	Germany	Latvia	Russia
2017–18	Germany	Austria	Canada
2018–19	Germany	Russia	Latvia
2019–20	Italy	none awarded	Germany
2019–20	Russia	none awarded	Germany
2020–21	Germany	Russia	Latvia
2021–22	Germany	Latvia	Austria
2022–23	Germany	Latvia	Austria
2023–24	Germany	Austria	United States
2024–25	Austria	Germany	Latvia
2025–26	Austria	Latvia	Germany

Medals

Rank	Nation	Gold	Silver	Bronze	Total
1	Germany	18	2	3	23
2	Austria	2	5	4	11
3	Italy	2	4	0	6
4	Russia	1	4	3	8
5	Canada	1	2	2	5
6	Latvia	0	4	3	7
7	United States	0	3	7	10
Totals (7 entries)		24	24	22	70

== All-time medal count ==
Rank	Nation	Gold	Silver	Bronze	Total
1	Germany	86	72	62	220
2	Italy	39	33	23	95
3	Austria	25	27	34	86
4	East Germany	8	6	11	25
5	Russia	5	8	10	23
6	West Germany	5	7	9	21
7	United States	4	6	19	29
8	Soviet Union	4	4	4	12
9	Canada	1	3	2	6
10	Latvia	0	8	8	16
11	Liechtenstein	0	0	1	1
Totals (11 entries)		177	174	183	534

== Multiple winners ==
=== Men ===
Rank	Athlete	Country	From	To	Gold	Silver	Bronze	Total
1	Norbert Huber	Italy	1983	1998	11	3	3	17
2	Armin Zöggeler	Italy	1995	2014	10	4	1	15
3	Markus Prock	Austria	1985	2002	10	2	2	14
4	Felix Loch	Germany	2010	2026	8	3	5	16
5	Hansjörg Raffl	Italy	1979	1993	8	3	2	13
6	Tobias Arlt	Germany	2011	2026	7	6	2	15
6	Tobias Wendl	Germany	2011	2026	7	6	2	15
8	Sascha Benecken	Germany	2012	2023	6	4	1	11
8	Toni Eggert	Germany	2012	2023	6	4	1	11
10	Patric Leitner	Germany	1999	2010	6	3	2	11
10	Alexander Resch	Germany	1999	2010	6	3	2	11

=== Women ===
Rank	Athlete	Country	From	To	Gold	Silver	Bronze	Total
1	Natalie Geisenberger	Germany	2008	2022	8	4	2	14
2	Julia Taubitz	Germany	2019	2026	6	2	–	8
3	Silke Kraushaar-Pielach	Germany	1998	2008	5	6	–	11
4	Tatjana Hüfner	Germany	2006	2017	5	2	5	12
5	Sylke Otto	Germany	1995	2006	4	4	1	9
6	Angelika Schafferer	Austria	1978	1981	3	1	–	4
7	Gerda Weissensteiner	Italy	1989	1998	2	4	–	6
8	Ute Oberhoffner (Weiß)	East Germany	1983	1989	2	1	2	5
9	Selina Egle	Austria	2023	2026	2	1	–	3
9	Lara Kipp	Austria	2023	2026	2	1	–	3
9	Cerstin Schmidt	East Germany	1985	1987	2	1	–	3

== See also ==
- Overall Cup Winners
