= Eynar =

Eynar may refer to:

- Eynar, Iran, a village in Markazi Province, Iran
- Eynar Veyksha, Soviet luger
