= Dmitri Alekseyev (disambiguation) =

Dmitri Alekseyev (born 1973) is a Russian professional footballer.

Dmitri (Dmitry, Dimitri, etc.) Alekseyev (Alekseev, Alexeyev, etc.) (Russian: Дмитрий Алексеев) may also refer to:

- Dmitri Alexeev (born 1947), Russian pianist
- Dimitriy Alekseyev (born 1966), Soviet and Russian luger

== See also ==
- Dmitry Alekseyevich, Count Milyutin
- Dmitry
- Alexeyev
