= Aleksandr Belyakov =

Aleksandr Belyakov or Alexander Belyakov may refer to

- Aleksandr Belyakov (navigator) (1897–1982), Soviet flight navigator
- Aleksandr Belyakov (art director) (1904–1956)
- Aleksandr Belyakov (politician) (born 1945), Russian politician
- Aleksandr Belyakov (luger) (born 1962), Soviet luger
