= Kamenov =

Kamenov is a surname. Notable people with the surname include:

- Boyko Kamenov (born 1975), Bulgarian footballer
- Georgi Kamenov (born 1941), Bulgarian footballer
- Krasimir Kamenov (born 1962), Bulgarian luge competitor

== See also ==
- Kamenov Spur, Antarctic mountain
