= Martin Glynn =

Martin Glynn may refer to:

- Martin H. Glynn, governor of New York
- Martin Glynn (criminologist), British poet, theatre director, cultural activist and criminologist
- Martin Glynn (priest), rector of the Irish College of Bordeaux
- Martin Glynn (bobsleigh), Canadian bobsledder
- Martin Glynn, namesake of Glynn, Louisiana
