= Gattermann =

Gattermann is a German surname. Notable people with the surname include:

- Franz Gattermann (born 1955), Austrian cross-country skier
- Hans H. Gattermann (1931-1994), German politician
- Klaus Gattermann (born 1961), German alpine skier
- Ludwig Gattermann (1860–1920), German chemist
  - Gattermann reaction
