= Danco =

Danco may refer to:

- Émile Danco (1869–1898), Belgian explorer
- Suzanne Danco (1911–2000), Belgian operatic singer
- Ty Danco (born 1955), American luger
- Danco Coast, Antarctic Peninsula
  - Danco Island
- 9812 Danco, an asteroid
- Danco Laboratories - A pharmaceutical company in New York that distributes Mifeprex (RU-486)
