= Johann Fritz =

Johann Fritz may refer to:

- Johann Fritz (ice hockey)
- Johann Fritz (piano maker)
