= Martin Meinberg =

German bobsledder

Personal information
- Nationality: German
- Born: 14 January 1954 (age 71); Gelsenkirchen, West Germany

Sport
- Sport: Bobsleigh

Martin Meinberg (born 14 January 1954) is a German bobsledder. He competed in the four man event at the 1980 Winter Olympics.
