= Ute Oberhoffner =

East German luger

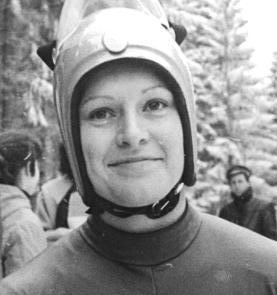
- Oberhoffner in 1985.
Medal record
Women's Luge
Representing East Germany
Olympic Games
Silver medal – second place	1988 Calgary	Women's singles
Bronze medal – third place	1984 Sarajevo	Women's singles
World Championships
Silver medal – second place	1989 Winterberg	Mixed team
Bronze medal – third place	1983 Lake Placid	Women's singles
Bronze medal – third place	1987 Igls	Women's singles
Bronze medal – third place	1989 Winterberg	Women's singles
World Cup Championships
Gold medal – first place	1982-83	Women's singles
Gold medal – first place	1988-89	Women's singles
Silver medal – second place	1984-85	Women's singles
Bronze medal – third place	1983-84	Women's singles
Bronze medal – third place	1985-86	Women's singles
European Championships
Gold medal – first place	1988 Königssee	Women's singles
Silver medal – second place	1988 Königssee	Mixed team
Bronze medal – third place	1986 Hammarstrand	Women's singles

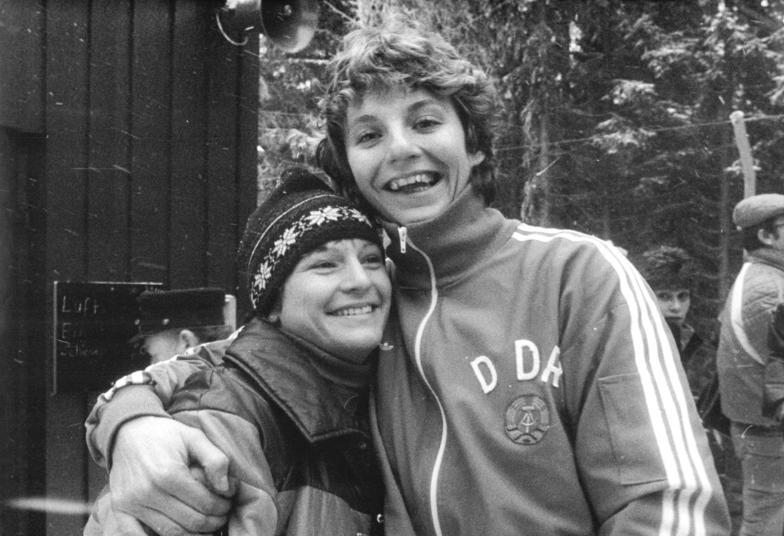
Ute Oberhoffner (left) and Steffi Martin (1984)

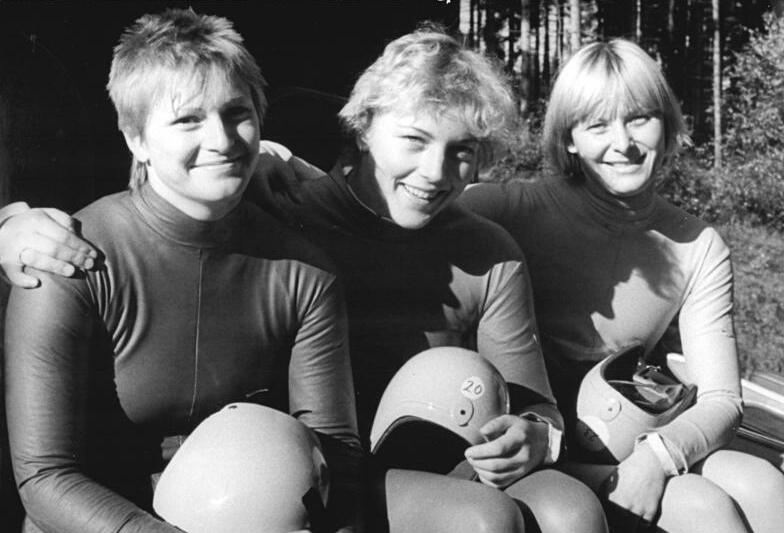
Ute Oberhoffner (left), Birgit Görlitzer and Cerstin Schmidt (right) in Oberhofen (18 October 1986)

Ute Oberhoffner (née Weiß, born 15 September 1961 in Ilmenau, Bezirk Suhl, sometimes shown as Ute Oberhoffner-Weiss) is an East German luger who competed during the 1980s. She won two medals in the women's singles event at the Winter Olympics with a silver in 1988 and a bronze in 1984.

Oberhoffner won four medals at the FIL World Luge Championships, earning one silver (Mixed team: 1989) and three bronzes (1983, 1987, 1989). She won a complete set of medals at the FIL European Luge Championships with a gold in the women's singles event (1988), and silver in the mixed team event (1988), and a bronze in the women's singles event (1986). Oberhoffner also won the overall Luge World Cup title in women's singles twice (1982–3, 1988–9).

After her career in luge, Oberhoffner became a teacher in her native Ilmenau for which she was honored in 2003.
