= Christopher Dyason =

British luger (born 1948)

Personal information
- Nationality: British
- Born: 13 March 1948 (age 77); Woodford Green, England

Sport
- Sport: Luge

Christopher Dyason (born 13 March 1948) is a British luger. He competed in the men's doubles event at the 1980 Winter Olympics.
