= Birgit Weise =

German luger

Medal record

Luge

World Championships
Bronze medal – third place	1985 Oberhof	Women's singles

Birgit Weise is an East German luger who competed during the mid-1980s. She won the bronze medal in the women's singles event at the 1985 FIL World Luge Championships in Oberhof, East Germany.
