= Giovanni Modena =

Italian decathlete and bobsledder

Personal information
- National team: Italy (athletics): 13 caps (1972-1977)
- Born: 1 September 1954 (age 71) Verona, Italy
- Height: 186 cm (6 ft 1 in)
- Weight: 86 kg (190 lb)

Sport
- Sport: Sport of athletics; Bobsleigh
- Events: Decathlon (athletics); Four-man event (bobsleigh)

Giovanni "Gianni" Modena (born 1 September 1954) is a former Italian combined-event athlete and bobsledder.

Modena won eight national championships at individual senior level.

== Achievements ==
=== Athletics ===
==== National titles ====
- Italian Athletics Championships
  - Decathlon: 1972, 1975, 1977 (3)
  - 4 × 100 metres relay: 1975 (1)
- Italian Indoor Athletics Championships
  - Pentathlon: 1973, 1974, 1975, 1976, 1977 (5)
  - Heptathlon: 1983 (1)

=== Bobsleigh ===
He competed in the four man event at the 1980 Winter Olympics.

== See also ==
- Italy at the 1980 Winter Olympics
