= Cerstin Schmidt =

East German luger

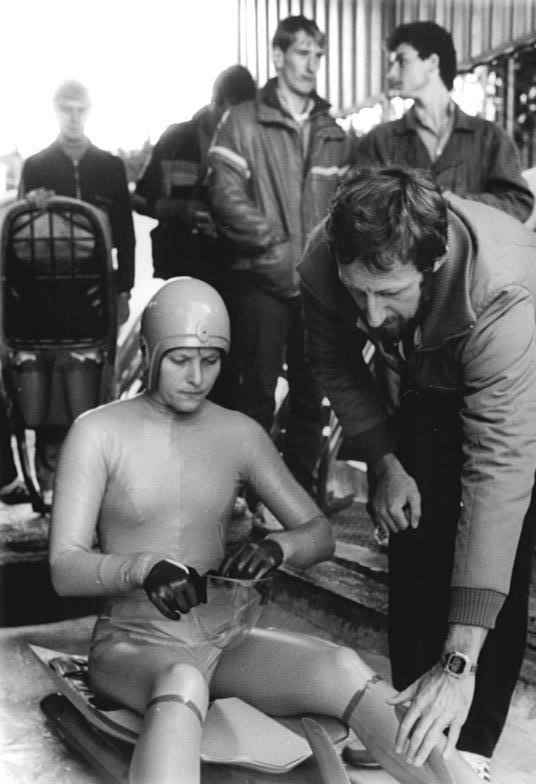
- Schmidt (seated) in 1987.
Medal record
Women's Luge
Representing German Democratic Republic
Olympic Games
Bronze medal – third place	1988 Calgary	Women's singles
World Championships
Gold medal – first place	1987 Igls	Women's singles
Silver medal – second place	1981 Hammarstrand	Women's singles
Silver medal – second place	1985 Oberhof	Women's singles
World Cup Championships
Gold medal – first place	1984-85	Women's singles
Gold medal – first place	1986-87	Women's singles
Silver medal – second place	1985-86	Women's singles
European Championships
Gold medal – first place	1986 Hammarstrand	Women's singles
Silver medal – second place	1988 Königssee	Mixed team
Bronze medal – third place	1984 Olang	Women's singles
Bronze medal – third place	1988 Königssee	Women's singles

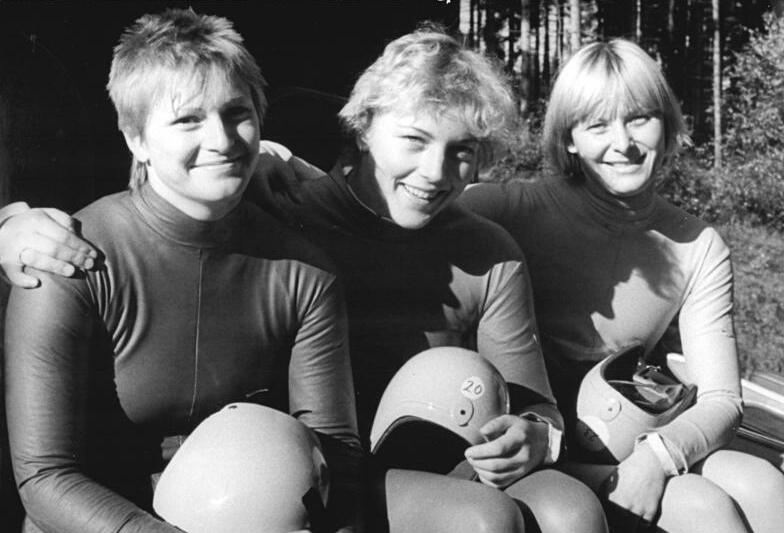
Ute Oberhoffner (left), Birgit Görlitzer and Cerstin Schmidt (right) in Oberhofen, October 18, 1986

Cerstin Schmidt (born 5 March 1963 in Zwickau, Bezirk Karl-Marx-Stadt) is an East German luger who competed during the mid to late 1980s. She won the bronze medal in the women's singles event at the 1988 Winter Olympics in Calgary.

Schmidt also won three medals at the FIL World Luge Championships with one gold (1987) and two silvers (1981, 1985) as well as four medals at the FIL European Luge Championships with one gold (Women's singles: 1986), one silver (Mixed team: 1988) and two bronzes (Women's singles: 1984, 1988).

Schmidt won the overall Luge World Cup title in the women's singles twice (1984/5, 1986/7).
