= Yuliya Antipova =

Soviet luger (born 1966)

Medal record

Luge

World Championships
Silver medal – second place	1990 Calgary	Women's singles
Bronze medal – third place	1989 Winterberg	Mixed team
Bronze medal – third place	1990 Calgary	Mixed team

Yuliya Antipova (born 14 July 1966) is a Soviet luger who competed in the late 1980s and early 1990s. She won three medals at the FIL World Luge Championships, including one silver (Women's singles: 1990) and two bronzes (Mixed team: 1989, 1990).

She finished fifth in the women's singles event at the 1988 Winter Olympics in Calgary. She was overall Luge World Cup champion in women's singles twice (1987-8, 1989–90).
