= FIL European Luge Championships 1986 =

The FIL European Luge Championships 1986 took place in Hammarstrand, Sweden for the fourth time after hosting the event previously in 1970, 1976, and 1978. It also marked the last time that the championships would take place on a natural track with the events now over at the FIL European Luge Natural Track Championships which started in 1970.

== Men's singles ==
Medal	Athlete	Time
Gold	Sergey Danilin (URS)	
Silver	Jens Müller (GDR)	
Bronze	Michael Walter (GDR)	

== Women's singles ==
Medal	Athlete	Time
Gold	Cerstin Schmidt (GDR)	
Silver	Steffi Martin (GDR)	
Bronze	Ute Oberhoffner-Weiss (GDR)	

== Men's doubles ==
Medal	Athlete	Time
Gold	Soviet Union (Yevgeny Belousov, Aleksandr Belyakov)	
Silver	East Germany (Jörg Hoffmann, Jochen Pietzsch)	
Bronze	Italy (Hansjörg Raffl, Norbert Huber)	

== Medal table ==
Rank	Nation	Gold	Silver	Bronze	Total
1	Soviet Union (URS)	2	0	0	2
2	East Germany (GDR)	1	3	2	6
3	Italy (ITA)	0	0	1	1
Totals (3 entries)		3	3	3	9
