= Maria-Luise Rainer =

Italian luger (born 1959)

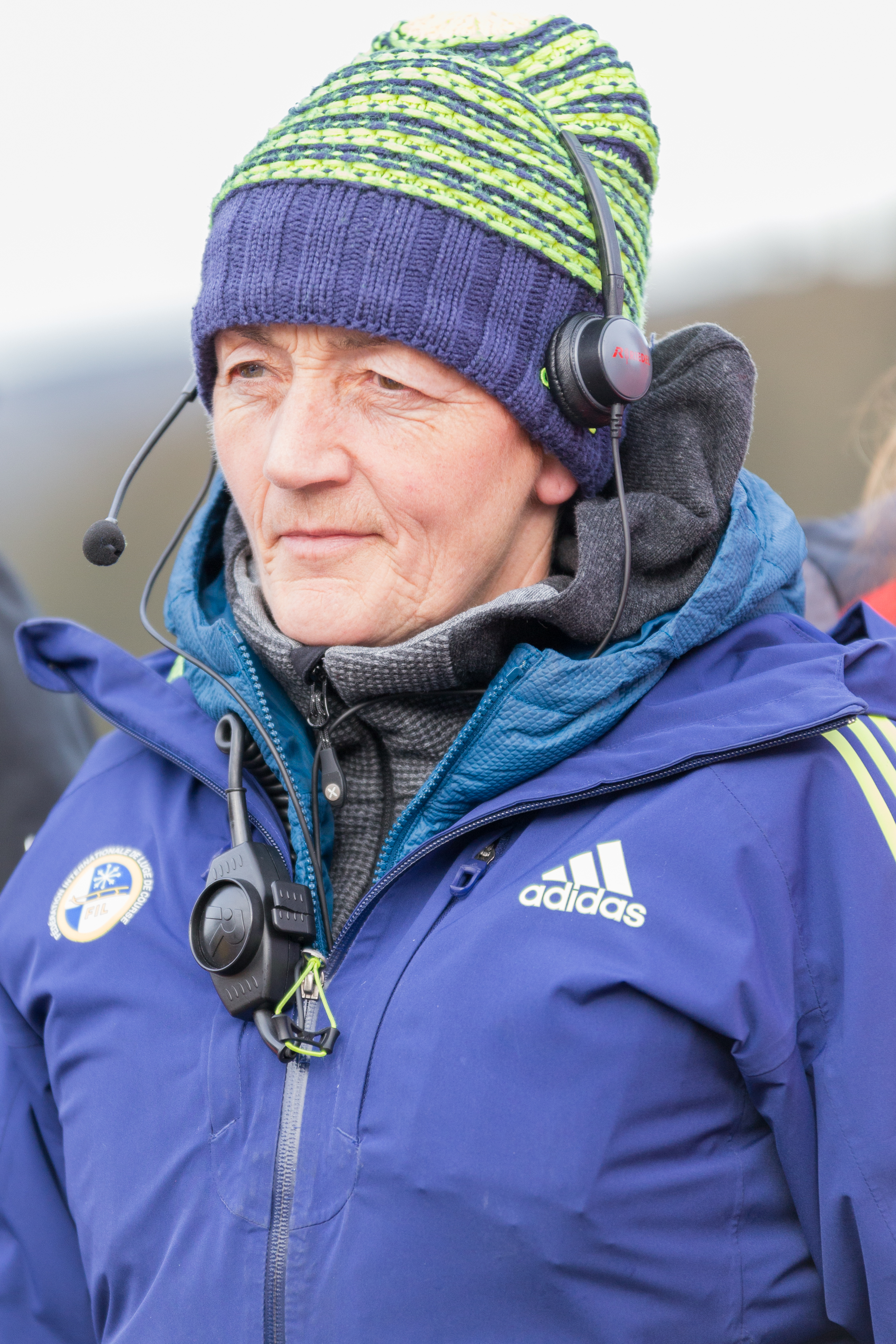
- Rainer in 2017

Personal information
- Nationality: Italian
- Born: 23 April 1959 (age 67) Sterzing, South Tyrol, Italy
- Height: 1.64 m (5 ft 5 in)
- Weight: 63 kg (139 lb)

Sport
- Country: Italy
- Sport: Luge
- Event: Singles

Achievements and titles
- Olympic finals: 1976–1988
- Personal bests: Olympics: 6th, 1984 (2:49.138); World Cup (overall): 1st, Women's singles, 1985–86
Medal record
World Championships
Bronze medal – third place	1979 Königssee	Women's singles
European Championships
Silver medal – second place	1980 Olang	Women's singles
Bronze medal – third place	1988 Königssee	Mixed team

Maria-Luise Rainer (born 23 April 1959) is an Italian former luger. She competed between the late 1970s and the late 1980s.

== Competitive career ==
Rainer won the bronze medal in the women's singles event at the 1979 FIL World Luge Championships in Königssee, West Germany. In addition, she won two medals at the FIL European Luge Championships with a silver (women's singles, 1980) and a bronze (mixed team, 1988). Rainer also won the overall Luge World Cup title in women's singles in the 1985–86 season.

Competing in four Winter Olympics (1976–1988), Rainer had her best finish of sixth in the women's singles event at Sarajevo in 1984.

== Later career ==
Later in her career, Rainer served as race director of the women's singles event at the 2006 Winter Olympics in Turin. Rainer has had a lengthy career with the International Luge Federation (FIL), serving as Senior Technical Director at FIL World Cup and World Championship competitions throughout Europe and North America.
