= Thomas Jacob (luger) =

East German luger (born 1965)

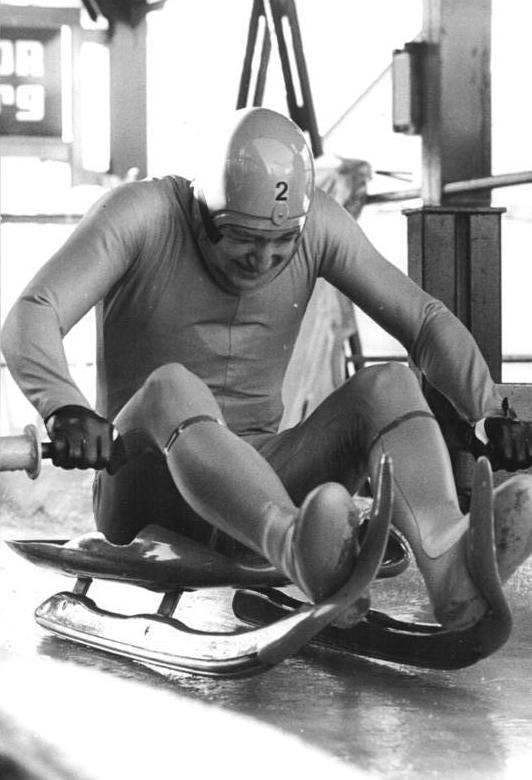
- Thomas Jacob.

Medal record

Luge

World Championships
Gold medal – first place	1990 Calgary	Mixed team

Thomas Jacob (born 11 November 1965) is an East German luger who competed from the late 1980s to 1990. He won the gold medal in the mixed team event at the 1990 FIL World Luge Championships in Calgary, Alberta, Canada. He also competed at the 1988 Winter Olympics
