= Kerstin Langkopf =

German luger

Medal record

Luge

European Championships
Gold medal – first place	1988 Königssee	Mixed team

Kerstin Langkopf is a West German luger who competed in the late 1980s. She won a gold medal in the mixed team event at the FIL European Luge Championships 1988 in Königssee, West Germany.

Martini also finished 19th in the 2008-09 Luge World Cup.
