= Peter Jansson =

Swedish bobsledder

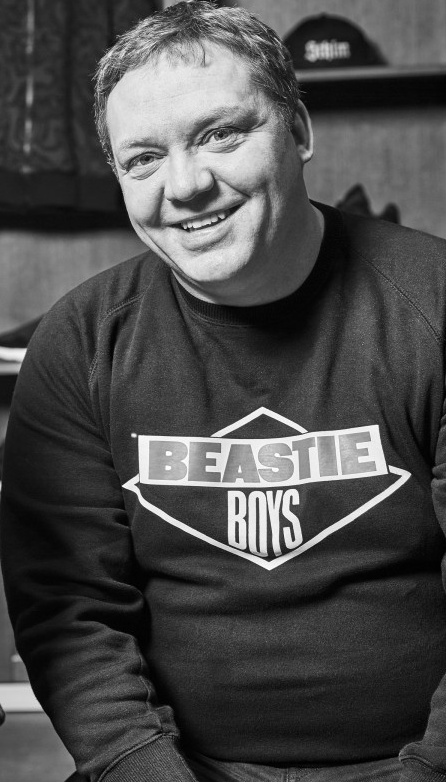

Personal information
- Nationality: Swedish
- Born: 4 June 1955 (age 69); Gävle, Sweden

Sport
- Sport: Bobsleigh

Sigurd Peter Jansson (born 4 June 1955) is a Swedish bobsledder. He competed in the four man event at the 1980 Winter Olympics.

Jansson represented Djurgårdens IF.
