= Duncan Kennedy (luger) =

American luger (born 1967)

Personal information
- Born: December 20, 1967 (age 58)

Sport
- Country: United States
- Sport: Luge
- Event: Men's singles
- Retired: 1997

Achievements and titles
- Olympic finals: 1988 1992 1994

Duncan Kennedy (born December 20, 1967) is an American luger who competed from 1979 to 1997. He is best known for being the first American to win a Luge World Cup event when he won at the Sigulda track in November 1991 in Latvia. Kennedy's best overall finish in the Luge World Cup was second twice, earning them in 1991–92 and 1993–94.

Competing in three Winter Olympics, Kennedy earned his best finish of tenth in the men's singles event at Albertville in 1992.

After retiring from competitive luge due to bleeding around the brain stem, Kennedy became a development coach for USA Luge, a position he still holds as of 2008. He was named a coach of the year for USA Luge in 2002.

During the 2002, 2006, 2010 and 2014 Winter Olympics Kennedy served as a television commentator for the luge competitions for NBC Sports in the United States.
