= Hans-Joachim Menge =

German luger (born 1963)

Personal information
- Nationality: German
- Born: 27 February 1963 (age 62); Wüstheuterode, East Germany

Sport
- Sport: Luge

Hans-Joachim Menge (born 27 February 1963) is a German luger. He competed in the men's doubles event at the 1984 Winter Olympics.
