= Gennady Belyakov =

Russian luger (born 1968)

Medal record

Luge

World Championships
Bronze medal – third place	1990 Calgary	Mixed team

Gennady Belyakov (Russian: Геннадий Беляков; born 7 June 1968 in Moscow) is a Soviet luger who competed in the late 1980s to 1990. He won the bronze medal in the mixed team event at the 1990 FIL World Luge Championships in Calgary, Alberta, Canada.
