= Johannes Schettel =

German luger (born 1959)

Medal record

Luge

World Championships
Bronze medal – third place	1989 Winterberg	Men's singles

European Championships
Gold medal – first place	1988 Königssee	Mixed team
Silver medal – second place	1990 Igls	Mixed team
Bronze medal – third place	1988 Königssee	Men's singles

Johannes Schettel (born 4 April 1959 in Olsberg, North Rhine-Westphalia) is a West German luger who competed in the late 1980s. He won the bronze medal in the men's singles event at the 1989 FIL World Luge Championships in Winterberg, West Germany.

He also won a complete set of medals at the FIL European Luge Championships with a gold in the mixed team event (1988), a silver in the mixed team event (1990), and a bronze in the men's singles event (1988). Schettel also finished seventh in the men's singles event at the 1988 Winter Olympics in Calgary.

His best overall Luge World Cup finish was second in men's singles in 1985-6. He retired in 1989 and is running a sporting goods store in Germany with his wife Claudia.
