= Lutz Kühnlenz =

German luger (born 1965)

Medal record

Men'sLuge

Representing East Germany

World Championships
Silver medal – second place	1985 Oberhof	Men's doubles

World Cup Championships
Bronze medal – third place	1984-05	Men's doubles

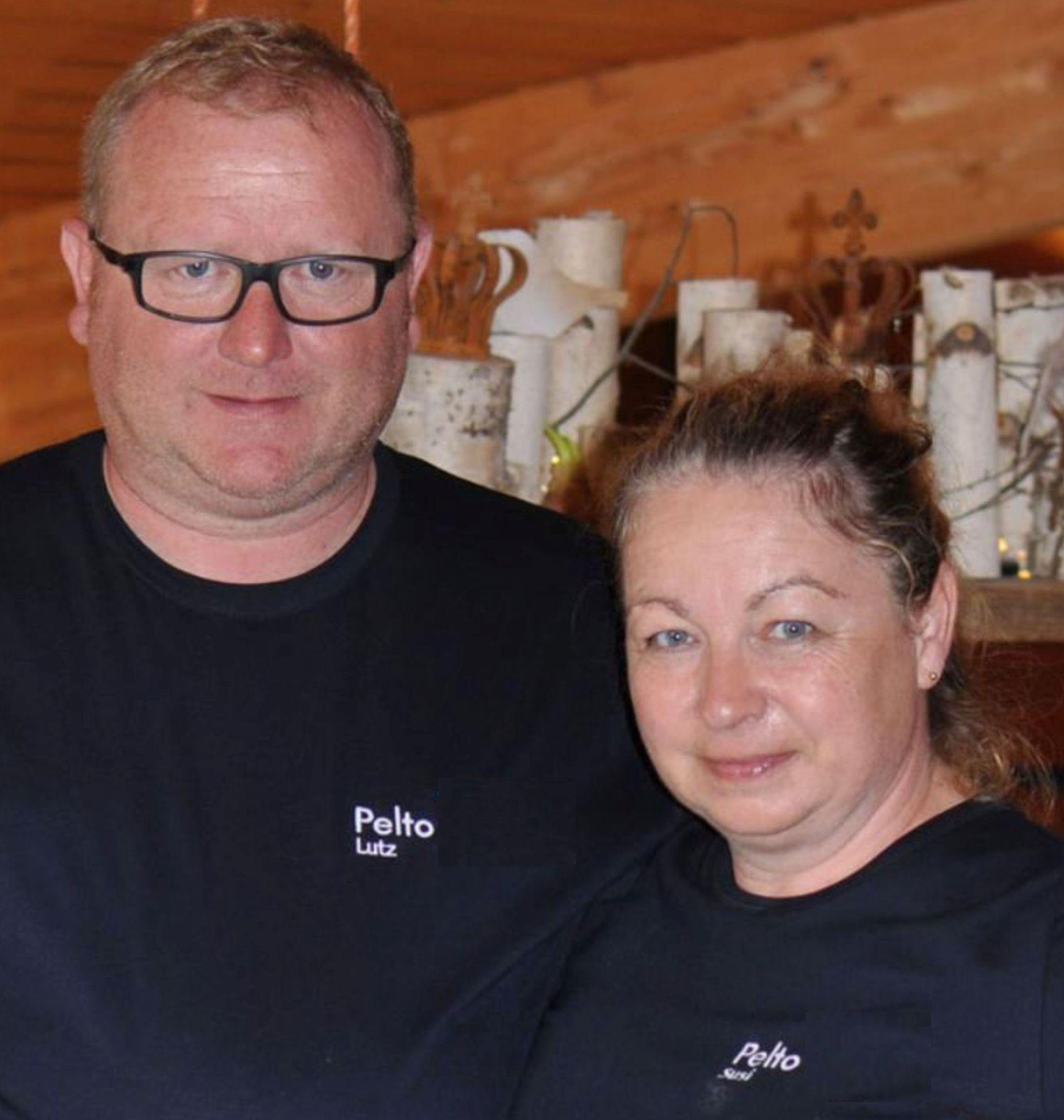
Lutz and Susanne Kühnlenz 2017

Lutz Kühnlenz (born 24 June 1965 in Ilmenau) is an East German luger who competed in the mid-1980s. He won the silver medal in the men's doubles event at the 1985 FIL World Luge Championships.

His sporting talent was recognized early and promoted in the Children and Youth Sports School (KJS) in Oberhof. Even as a teenager he specialized in luge on the doubles and at the age of 18 he and his partner, René Keller, were already vice European- and World Champions in the youth competitions. In 1982, the two became GDR champions in Oberwiesenthal, and in 1985 and 1986 they were runners-up in Oberhof. Kühnlenz's best overall finish in the Luge World Cup was third in men's doubles in 1984-5. Biggest success was the silver medal at the World Championships 1985.

In 1986 Kühnlenz married the luger Susanne Chitry. Shortly before the Olympics - although Kühnlenz and his partner still finished 6th at the 1987 World Championships in Innsbruck and successfully competed in the pre-Olympic tests for Calgary in 1988 with a World Cup victory - the "performance mandate" of Kühnlenz was withdrawn, after his wife was surprisingly revoked from a trip into a "non-socialist country". Kühnlenz than was unable to continue his sporting career. In 1990 he received his diploma as a sports teacher from the German University for Physical Culture in Leipzig.

After completing his sporting career, Lutz Kühnlenz and his wife founded a sauna company between Erfurt and Weimar, and he took some honorary positions; i.a. in the club board of the German Sauna Association. The couple has two sons.

== Achievements ==
(selection)

Juniors:

- European Championship 1983 in Innsbruck: 2nd place
- World Championship 1984 in Bludenz: 2nd place

Seniors:

- World Cup victories:
  - Season 1983/84: Königssee
  - 1984/85: Hammarstrand
  - 1985/86 and 1986/87: Oberhof
- World Championship 1985 Oberhof: 2nd place

== Honors ==
Patriotic Order of Merit in Silver
