= Detlef Bertz =

German luger (born 1962)

Personal information
- Nationality: German
- Born: 2 April 1962 (age 63); Oschatz, East Germany

Sport
- Sport: Luge

Detlef Bertz (born 2 April 1962) is a German former luger. He competed in the men's doubles event at the 1984 Winter Olympics.
