= Veronika Bilgeri =

German luger

Medal record

Luge

European Championships
Gold medal – first place	1988 Königssee	Mixed team
Silver medal – second place	1988 Königssee	Women's singles

Veronika Bilgeri (born 25 January 1966 in Bad Tölz) is a West German luger who competed during the late 1980s. She won two medals at the 1988 FIL European Luge Championships in Königssee, West Germany with a gold in the mixed team event and a silver in the women's singles event.

Bilgeri also finished fourth in the women's singles event at the 1988 Winter Olympics in Calgary, Alberta, Canada.
