= FIL European Luge Championships 1988 =

The FIL European Luge Championships 1988 took place in Königssee, West Germany for a record fifth time after hosting the event previously in 1967, 1972, 1973, and 1977. The mixed team event debuted at these championships with two runs from men's singles, two runs from women's singles, and one run from men's doubles.

== Men's singles ==
Medal	Athlete	Time
Gold	Georg Hackl (FRG)	
Silver	Markus Prock (AUT)	
Bronze	Johannes Schettel (FRG)	

== Women's singles ==
Medal	Athlete	Time
Gold	Ute Oberhoffner-Weiss (GDR)	
Silver	Veronika Bilgeri (FRG)	
Bronze	Cerstin Schmidt (GDR)	

== Men's doubles ==
Medal	Athlete	Time
Gold	West Germany (Thomas Schwab, Wolfgang Staudinger)	
Silver	Italy (Hansjörg Raffl, Norbert Huber)	
Bronze	Soviet Union (Yevgeniy Belusov, Aleksandr Belyakov)	

== Mixed team ==
Medal	Athlete	Time
Gold	West Germany (Georg Hackl, Johannes Schettel, Kerstin Langkopf, Veronika Bilgeri, Thomas Schwab, Wolfgang Staudinger)	
Silver	East Germany (Michael Walter, Jens Müller, Cerstin Schmidt, Ute Oberhoffner-Weiss, Marco Ernst, Olaf Paschold)	
Bronze	Italy (Norbert Huber, Paul Hildgartner, Marie-Luise Rainer, Gerda Weissensteiner, Hansjörg Raffl)	

== Medal table ==
Rank	Nation	Gold	Silver	Bronze	Total
1	West Germany (FRG)	3	1	1	5
2	East Germany (GDR)	1	1	1	3
3	Italy (ITA)	0	1	1	2
4	Austria (AUT)	0	1	0	1
5	Soviet Union (URS)	0	0	1	1
Totals (5 entries)		4	4	4	12
