= Sandu Mitrofan =

Romanian bobsledder

Personal information
- Nationality: Romanian
- Born: 8 October 1952 (age 72)

Sport
- Sport: Bobsleigh

Sandu Mitrofan (born 8 October 1952) is a Romanian bobsledder. He competed in the four man event at the 1980 Winter Olympics.
