= Kenneth Holm =

Swedish luger (born 1958)

Personal information
- Nationality: Swedish
- Born: 5 February 1958 (age 68) Stockholm, Sweden

Sport
- Sport: Luge

Kenneth Holm (born 5 February 1958) is a Swedish luger. He competed in the men's doubles event at the 1980 Winter Olympics.
