= Bernhard Kammerer =

Italian luger (born 1962)

Personal information
- Nationality: Italian
- Born: 21 March 1962 (age 63); Kiens, Italy

Sport
- Sport: Luge

Bernhard Kammerer (born 21 March 1962) is an Italian luger. He competed in the men's doubles event at the 1988 Winter Olympics.
