= Jeff Jordan (bobsleigh) =

American bobsledder

Personal information
- Born: May 29, 1956 (age 70) Rockville Centre, New York, United States

Sport
- Sport: Bobsleigh

Jeff Jordan (born May 29, 1956) is an American bobsledder. He competed in the four man event at the 1980 Winter Olympics.
