= Ulrich Schindler =

Swiss bobsledder (born 1947)

Personal information
- Nationality: Swiss
- Born: 19 December 1947 (age 77)

Sport
- Sport: Bobsleigh

Ulrich Schindler (born 19 December 1947) is a Swiss bobsledder. He competed in the four man event at the 1980 Winter Olympics.
