= Steven Maher =

American luger (born 1962)

Personal information
- Nationality: American
- Born: November 29, 1962 (age 63) Evanston, Illinois, United States

Sport
- Sport: Luge

Steven Maher (born November 29, 1962) is an American luger. He competed in the men's doubles event at the 1988 Winter Olympics.
