= Regina König =

German luger

Medal record

Women's Luge

Representing West Germany

World Cup Championships
Gold medal – first place	1977-78	Women's singles

Regina König is a West German former luger who competed in the late 1970s. She was the first women's singles Luge World Cup overall champion in 1977–8.
