= Alois Schnorbus =

German bobsledder

Personal information
- Nationality: German
- Born: 12 January 1952 (age 73); Winterberg, West Germany

Sport
- Sport: Bobsleigh

Alois Schnorbus (born 12 January 1952) is a German bobsledder. He competed in the four man event at the 1980 Winter Olympics.
