= Joe Barile =

American luger (born 1959)

Personal information
- Nationality: American
- Born: May 6, 1959 (age 67)

Sport
- Sport: Luge

Joe Barile (born May 6, 1959) is an American luger. He competed in the men's doubles event at the 1988 Winter Olympics.
