= Luge at the 1980 Winter Olympics =

Luge at the XIII Olympic Winter Games
- Venue: Mt. Van Hoevenberg Olympic Bobsled Run
- Dates: 13–16 February 1980
- Competitors: 80 from 14 nations

Luge at the 1980 Winter Olympics consisted of three events at Mt. Van Hoevenberg Olympic Bobsled Run. The competition took place between 13 and 16 February 1980.

== Medal summary ==
=== Medal table ===
Rank	Nation	Gold	Silver	Bronze	Total
1	East Germany	2	1	0	3
2	Soviet Union	1	0	1	2
3	Italy	0	2	0	2
4	Austria	0	0	1	1
4	West Germany	0	0	1	1
Totals (5 entries)		3	3	3	9

East Germany led the medal table with three medals, two gold.

=== Events ===
Event	Gold		Silver		Bronze	
Men's singles	Bernhard Glass; East Germany	2:54.796	Paul Hildgartner; Italy	2:55.372	Anton Winkler; West Germany	2:56.545
Women's singles	Vera Zozuļa; Soviet Union	2:36.537	Melitta Sollmann; East Germany	2:37.657	Ingrīda Amantova; Soviet Union	2:37.817
Doubles	East Germany; Hans Rinn; Norbert Hahn	1:19.331	Italy; Peter Gschnitzer; Karl Brunner	1:19.606	Austria; Georg Fluckinger; Karl Schrott	1:19.795

== Participating NOCs ==
Fourteen nations participated in Luge at the Lake Placid Games. Romania made their Olympic luge debut.

- Austria (10)
- Canada (4)
- West Germany (7)
- Great Britain (7)
- East Germany (9)
- Italy (9)
- Japan (2)
- Liechtenstein (2)
- Romania (4)
- Switzerland (2)
- Sweden (4)
- Czechoslovakia (3)
- Soviet Union (7)
- United States (10)
