= Doug Bateman =

American luger (born 1954)

Personal information
- Nationality: American
- Born: January 19, 1954 (age 72) Somerville, New Jersey, United States

Sport
- Sport: Luge

Doug Bateman (born January 19, 1954) is an American luger. He competed in the men's doubles event at the 1984 Winter Olympics.
