= FIL World Luge Championships 1985 =

The FIL World Luge Championships 1985 took place in Oberhof, East Germany for the second time, having done so previously in 1973.

== Men's singles ==
Medal	Athlete	Time
Gold	Michael Walter (GDR)	
Silver	Jörg Hoffmann (GDR)	
Bronze	Jens Müller (GDR)	

== Women's singles ==
Medal	Athlete	Time
Gold	Steffi Martin (GDR)	
Silver	Cerstin Schmidt (GDR)	
Bronze	Birgit Weise (GDR)	

== Men's doubles ==
Medal	Athlete	Time
Gold	East Germany (Jörg Hoffmann, Jochen Pietzsch)	
Silver	East Germany (René Keller, Lutz Kühnlenz)	
Bronze	Soviet Union (Vitaliy Melnik, Dimitriy Alekseyev)	

== Medal table ==
Rank	Nation	Gold	Silver	Bronze	Total
1	East Germany (GDR)	3	3	2	8
2	Soviet Union (URS)	0	0	1	1
Totals (2 entries)		3	3	3	9
