= Richard Healey (luger) =

American luger (born 1959)

Personal information
- Nationality: American
- Born: February 22, 1959 (age 67) Somerville, New Jersey, United States

Sport
- Sport: Luge

Richard Healey (born February 22, 1959) is an American luger from Somerville, New Jersey. He came 11th in the men's doubles event at the 1980 Winter Olympics.

He received his degree from North Dakota State University. Healey competed in luge from 1977-80. He finished sixth at the 1979 North American Championships.
