= Armin Baumgartner =

Swiss bobsledder (born 1950)

Personal information
- Nationality: Swiss
- Born: 8 March 1950 (age 75)

Sport
- Sport: Bobsleigh

Armin Baumgartner (born 8 March 1950) is a Swiss bobsledder. He competed in the four man event at the 1980 Winter Olympics.
