= René Keller =

German luger

Medal record

Men's Luge

Representing East Germany

World Championships
Silver medal – second place	1985 Oberhof	Men's doubles

World Cup Championships
Bronze medal – third place	1984-05	Men's doubles

René Keller is an East German luger who competed in the mid-1980s. He won the silver medal in the men's doubles event at the 1985 FIL World Luge Championships in Oberhof, East Germany.

Keller's best overall finish in the Luge World Cup was third in men's doubles in 1984-5.
