= Ronald Rossi =

American luger (born 1956)

Ronald Rossi OLY
Personal information
- Nationality: American
- Born: December 2, 1956 (age 69) The Bronx, New York, United States

Sport
- Sport: Luge

Ronald Rossi OLY (born December 2, 1956) is an American former luger. He competed in the men's doubles event at the 1984 Winter Olympics.
