= Bob Hickey (bobsleigh) =

American bobsledder

Personal information
- Born: May 11, 1952 (age 74) Keene Valley, New York, United States

Sport
- Sport: Bobsleigh

Bob Hickey (born May 11, 1952) is an American bobsledder. He competed in the four man event at the 1980 Winter Olympics.
