= Michael Walter (luger) =

German luger (1959–2016)

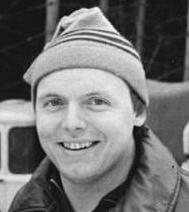
- Walter in 1984

Medal record

Men's luge

Representing East Germany

World Championships
Gold medal – first place	1985 Oberhof	Men's singles
Silver medal – second place	1981 Hammarstrand	Men's singles

World Cup Championships
Gold medal – first place	1983-84	Men's singles
Bronze medal – third place	1981-82	Men's singles

European Championships
Silver medal – second place	1988 Königssee	Mixed team
Bronze medal – third place	1986 Hammarstrand	Men's singles

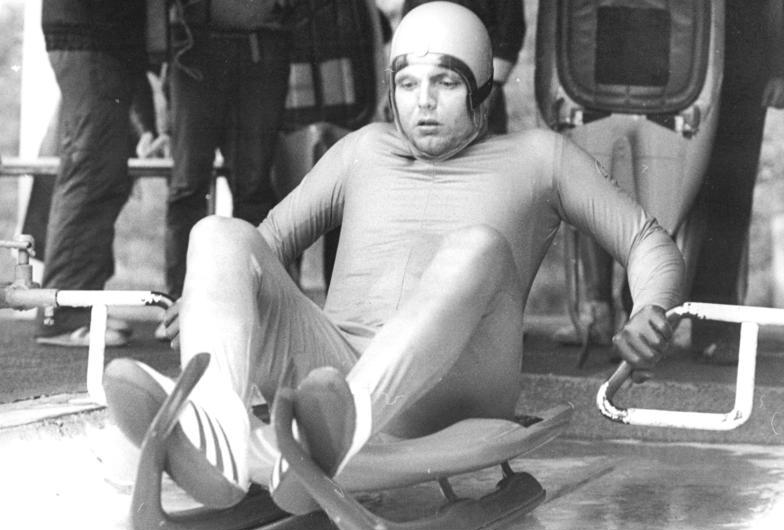
Walter in 1984

Michael Walter (12 March 1959 in Pirna – 6 August 2016) was a German luger who competed during the 1980s. He won two medals in the men's singles event at the FIL World Luge Championships with a gold in 1985 and a silver in 1981.

Walter also won two medals at the FIL European Luge Championships with a silver in the mixed team event (1988) and a bronze in the men's singles event (1986). He also won the men's singles Luge World Cup overall title in 1983-4.

Walter also competed in two Winter Olympics and was a substitute for the East German team on a third. His best finish at the Winter Olympics was fourth in the men's singles event at Sarajevo in 1984.
