= Jeff Gadley =

American bobsledder (born 1955)

Personal information
- Born: Buffalo, New York, United States
- Height: 5 ft 11 in (180 cm)
- Weight: 175

Sport
- Sport: Bobsleigh

Jeff Gadley (born June 14, 1955) is an American bobsledder. He competed in the four man event at the 1980 Winter Olympics. He and Willie Davenport, teammates on a four-man bobsled at the 1980 Winter Olympics, are the first African Americans to compete for the United States in the Winter Olympics.
