= Andrey Rochilov =

Soviet luger

Medal record

Luge

World Championships
Bronze medal – third place	1990 Calgary	Mixed team

Andrey Rochilov is a Soviet luger who competed from the late 1980s to 1990. He won the bronze medal in the mixed team event at the 1990 FIL World Luge Championships in Calgary.
