= Ingrīda Amantova =

Latvian luger

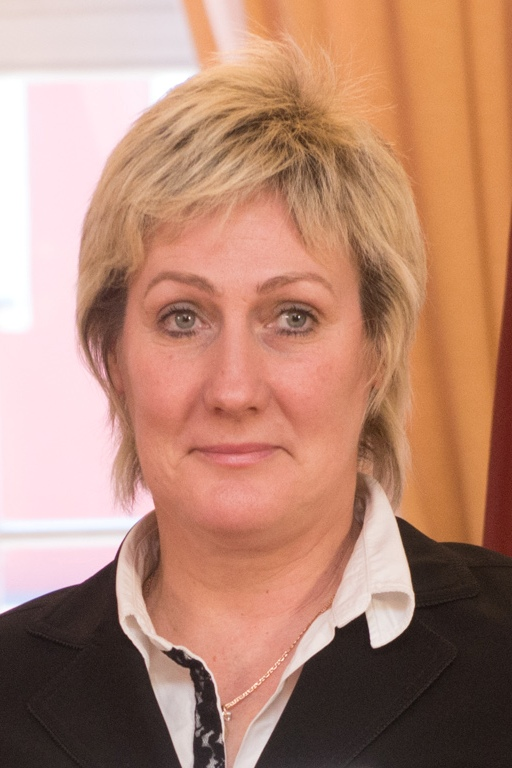
- Amantova in 2015

Medal record

Women's luge

Representing the Soviet Union

Olympic Games
Bronze medal – third place	1980 Lake Placid	Women's singles

Ingrīda Amantova (born 21 June 1960 in Cēsis) is a Latvian-born Soviet luger who competed during the early 1980s. Competing in two Winter Olympics, she won the bronze medal in the women's singles event at Lake Placid, New York, in 1980 and finished fourth in the same event at the following Winter Olympics in Sarajevo. This was the only instance where Soviet or Latvian athletes won Olympic medals in women's luge.

Amantova's best overall Luge World Cup finish was second in 1982-3. She was three times the champion of Soviet Union in luge.

She was mainly training on the domestic track near Sigulda. The track was open in the 1970s and became the first one in Soviet Union. Amantova belonged to the first generation of Soviet athletes who used the track and demonstrated top-level results.
