= Lothar Pongratz =

German bobsledder

Personal information
- Nationality: German
- Born: 7 January 1952; Weiden, West Germany
- Died: 2 July 2013 (aged 61); Paderborn, Germany

Sport
- Sport: Bobsleigh

Lothar Pongratz (7 January 1952 – 2 July 2013) was a German bobsledder. He competed in the four man event at the 1980 Winter Olympics.
