= Jürgen Hofmann =

German bobsledder

Personal information
- Nationality: German
- Born: 3 October 1958 (age 66); Heidelberg, West Germany

Sport
- Sport: Bobsleigh

Jürgen Hofmann (born 3 October 1958) is a German bobsledder. He competed in the four man event at the 1980 Winter Olympics.
