= Cristinel Piciorea =

Romanian luger (born 1960)

Personal information
- Nationality: Romanian
- Born: 16 February 1960 (age 65)

Sport
- Sport: Luge

Cristinel Piciorea (born 16 February 1960) is a Romanian luger. He competed in the men's doubles event at the 1980 Winter Olympics.
