= Laurențiu Bălănoiu =

Romanian luger (born 1962)

Personal information
- Nationality: Romanian
- Born: 16 July 1962 (age 63) Sinaia, Romania

Sport
- Sport: Luge

Laurențiu Bălănoiu (born 16 July 1962) is a Romanian luger. He competed in the men's doubles event at the 1984 Winter Olympics.
