= John Denby (luger) =

British luger (born 1946)

Personal information
- Nationality: British
- Born: 16 August 1946 (age 78)

Sport
- Sport: Luge

John Denby (born 16 August 1946) is a British luger. He competed in the men's doubles event at the 1980 Winter Olympics.
