= Angelika Schafferer =

Austrian luger (born 1960)

Medal record

Luge

World Championships
Bronze medal – third place	1978 Imst	Women's singles

Angelika Schafferer (born 1960) is an Austrian luger who competed during the late 1970s and early 1980s. She won the bronze medal in the women's singles event at the 1978 FIL World Luge Championships in Imst, Austria.

Schafferer also competed in three Winter Olympics in women's singles, earning her best finish of seventh at Lake Placid, New York, in 1980.

She won the overall women's singles Luge World Cup title three times (1978-9, 1979–80, 1980–1).
