= Giovanni Paganin =

Italian speed skater

Personal information
- Nationality: Italian
- Born: 28 April 1955 Asiago, Italy
- Died: 10 March 1990 (aged 34)

Sport
- Sport: Speed skating

Giovanni Paganin (28 April 1955 – 10 March 1990) was an Italian speed skater. He competed in two events at the 1980 Winter Olympics.
