= Andrea Jory =

Italian bobsledder (born 1957)

Personal information
- Nationality: Italian
- Born: 25 May 1957 (age 67)

Sport
- Sport: Bobsleigh

Andrea Jory (born 25 May 1957) is an Italian bobsledder. He competed in the two man and the four man events at the 1980 Winter Olympics.
