= Alfred Silginer =

Italian luger (born 1959)

Personal information
- Nationality: Italian
- Born: 18 October 1959 (age 65)

Sport
- Sport: Luge

Alfred Silginer (born 18 October 1959) is an Italian luger. He competed in the men's doubles event at the 1980 Winter Olympics.
