= Mitko Bachev =

Bulgarian luger (born 1960)

Personal information
- Nationality: Bulgarian
- Born: 25 January 1960 (age 65)

Sport
- Sport: Luge

Mitko Bachev (Bulgarian: Митко Бачев) (born 25 January 1960) is a Bulgarian luger. He competed in the men's doubles event at the 1988 Winter Olympics.
