= Helmut Koren =

Austrian ice hockey player

Personal information
- Nationality: Austrian
- Born: 30 March 1958 (age 68) Klagenfurt, Austria

Sport
- Sport: Ice hockey

Helmut Koren (born 30 March 1958) is an Austrian ice hockey player. He competed in the men's tournament at the 1984 Winter Olympics.
