= Kurt Brugger =

Italian luger and coach

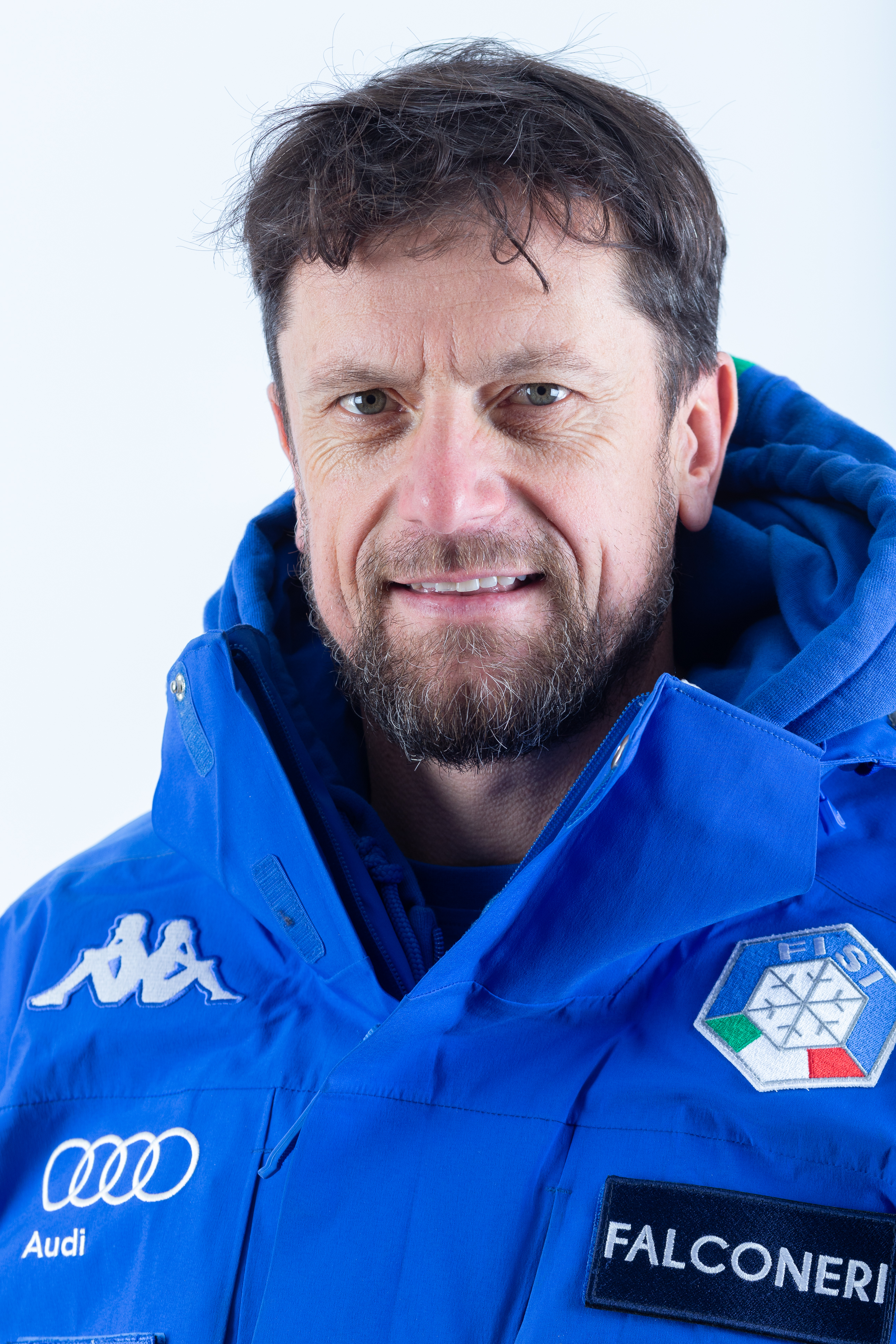
- Brugger in 2018

Medal record

Men's Luge

Representing Italy

Olympic Games
Gold medal – first place	1994 Lillehammer	Men's doubles

World Championships
Silver medal – second place	1990 Calgary	Men's doubles
Silver medal – second place	1995 Lillehammer	Mixed team
Bronze medal – third place	1993 Calgary	Men's doubles
Bronze medal – third place	1995 Lillehammer	Men's doubles

World Cup
Silver medal – second place	1989-90	Men's doubles
Silver medal – second place	1992-03	Men's doubles
Silver medal – second place	1994-05	Men's doubles
Silver medal – second place	1997-08	Men's doubles

European Championships
Gold medal – first place	1994 Königssee	Mixed team
Silver medal – second place	1992 Winterberg	Men's doubles
Silver medal – second place	1994 Königssee	Men's doubles
Silver medal – second place	1998 Oberhof	Mixed team

World Junior Championships
Gold medal – first place	1988 Olang	Men's singles
Bronze medal – third place	1988 Olang	Men's doubles

Kurt Brugger (born 17 March 1969 in Bruneck, South Tyrol) is an Italian luger and coach who competed from 1987 to 2003. Together with Wilfried Huber, he won the men's doubles event at the 1994 Winter Olympics in Lillehammer. He competed in four Winter Olympics: 1988, 1992, 1994 and 1998.

Brugger originally competed in both singles and doubles, making his debut in both in the Luge World Cup in 1986–87 season, but soon focused on doubles, in which he took his first podium with a second place in Olang in 1987, and his first win in Sarajevo in 1988. He also took two medals at the World Junior Championships in Olang in 1988, a gold in the singles and a bronze in the doubles.

Brugger also won three medals in the men's doubles event at the FIL World Luge Championships with one silver (1990) and two bronzes (1993, 1995) as well as a silver medal in the mixed team event (1995). At the FIL European Luge Championships, he won four medals with one gold (Mixed team: 1994) and three silvers (Men's doubles: 1992, 1994; Mixed team: 1998).

Brugger's best overall finish in the Luge World Cup men's doubles was second four times (1989–90, 1992–3, 1994–5, 1997-8).

He retired from competition after the 2002–03 season. He subsequently engaged in mountaineering, with his most significant achievement being scaling the Himalayan peak of Nanga Parbat. He has also served on the staff of the Italian luge team, and was appointed head coach in 2013.
