= Kuno Sekulic =

Austrian ice hockey player

Kruno Sekulic
Personal information
- Nationality: Austrian
- Born: 19 October 1961 (age 64) Villach, Austria

Sport
- Sport: Ice hockey

Kuno Sekulic (born 19 October 1961) is an Austrian ice hockey player. He competed in the men's tournament at the 1984 Winter Olympics.
