= Vitaliy Melnik =

Soviet luger (born 1966)

Medal record

Luge

World Championships
Bronze medal – third place	1985 Oberhof	Men's doubles

Vitaliy Melnik (born 25 January 1966) is a Soviet luger who competed in the mid-1980s. He won the bronze medal in the men's doubles event at the 1985 FIL World Luge Championships in Oberhof, East Germany. He also competed in the men's doubles event at the 1988 Winter Olympics.
