= Tony Wallington =

British bobsledder

Personal information
- Nationality: British
- Born: 5 October 1948 (age 76); Northampton, England

Sport
- Sport: Bobsleigh

Tony Wallington (born 5 October 1948) is a British bobsledder. He competed at the 1980 Winter Olympics and the 1984 Winter Olympics. He was an army officer being appointed Special Regular Commission as 483385 2nd Lt on 25 January 1974 with seniority dating back to 5 October 1967. He served with the Royal Tank Regiment.
