= Ty Danco =

American luger (born 1955)

Personal information
- Born: October 20, 1955 (age 70) New Haven, Connecticut, United States

Sport
- Sport: Luge

Ty Danco (born October 20, 1955) is an American luger. He competed in the men's doubles event at the 1980 Winter Olympics.
