= Georg Werth =

Italian bobsledder (born 1951)

Personal information
- Nationality: Italian
- Born: 21 January 1951 (age 74)

Sport
- Sport: Bobsleigh

Georg Werth (born 21 January 1951) is an Italian bobsledder. He competed in the two man and the four man events at the 1980 Winter Olympics.
