= Karl Schrott =

Austrian luger (born 1953)

Olympic medal record

Luge
Bronze medal – third place	1980 Lake Placid	Men's doubles

Karl Schrott (born 9 January 1953) is a former luger from Austria who competed in the late 1970s and early 1980s. He won the bronze medal in the men's doubles event at the 1980 Winter Olympics of Lake Placid, New York, together with partner Georg Fluckinger.

Schrott's best overall Luge World Cup finish was second twice in the men's doubles event (1978–9, 1979–80).
