= Michael Rudman (ice hockey) =

Austrian ice hockey player

Personal information
- Nationality: Austrian
- Born: 11 October 1954 (age 71) Graz, Austria

Sport
- Sport: Ice hockey

Michael Rudman (born 11 October 1954) is an Austrian ice hockey player. He competed in the men's tournament at the 1984 Winter Olympics.
