= Christine Brunner =

Austrian luger

Christine Brunner (born 25 September 1959) is an Austrian luger who competed in the late 1970s and early 1980s. She is best known for finishing third overall in the Luge World Cup women's singles twice (1978–79, 1979–80).

Brunner also finished tenth in the women's singles event at the 1980 Winter Olympics in Lake Placid.
