= Heinz Steinberger =

Austrian speed skater

Heinz Steinberger (born February 14, 1958) is a former ice speed skater from Austria. He represented his native country in two Winter Olympics - 1976 in Innsbruck and 1984 in Sarajevo.
