= Nadia Prinoth =

Italian luger

Medal record

Luge

World Championships
Silver medal – second place	1990 Calgary	Mixed team

Nadia Prinoth is an Italian luger who competed from the late 1980s to 1990. She won the silver medal in the mixed team event at the 1990 FIL World Luge Championships in Calgary.
