= Franz Rednak =

Austrian bobsledder

Personal information
- Nationality: Austrian
- Born: 1 April 1949 (age 75); Feldkirch, Austria

Sport
- Sport: Bobsleigh

Franz Rednak (born 1 April 1949) is an Austrian bobsledder. He competed in the four man event at the 1980 Winter Olympics.
