= Heinrich Bergmüller =

Austrian bobsledder

Personal information
- Nationality: Austrian
- Born: 26 October 1952 (age 72); Salzburg, Austria

Sport
- Sport: Bobsleigh

Heinrich Bergmüller (born 26 October 1952) is an Austrian bobsledder. He competed in the four man event at the 1980 Winter Olympics.
