= Bernhard Purkrabek =

Austrian bobsledder

Personal information
- Nationality: Austrian
- Born: 7 May 1954 (age 71) Zell am Ziller, Austria

Sport
- Sport: Bobsleigh

Bernhard Purkrabek (born 7 May 1954) is an Austrian bobsledder. He competed in the four man event at the 1980 Winter Olympics.
