= Martin Glynn (bobsleigh) =

Canadian bobsledder

Personal information
- Nationality: Canadian
- Born: 7 January 1951 (age 74)

Sport
- Sport: Bobsleigh

Martin Glynn (born 7 January 1951) is a Canadian bobsledder. He competed in the four man event at the 1980 Winter Olympics.
