= Walter Hörl =

Austrian biathlete (born 1963)

Personal information
- Nationality: Austrian
- Born: 1 July 1963 (age 62) Saalfelden, Austria

Sport
- Sport: Biathlon

Walter Hörl (born 1 July 1963) is an Austrian biathlete. He competed in the 10 km sprint event at the 1984 Winter Olympics.
