= Arduino Tiraboschi =

Italian biathlete (born 1951)

Personal information
- Nationality: Italian
- Born: 21 August 1951 (age 73); Serina, Italy

Sport
- Sport: Biathlon

Arduino Tiraboschi (born 21 August 1951) is an Italian biathlete. He competed in the 20 km individual event at the 1980 Winter Olympics. Tiraboschi also won the Italian biathlon championship on ten occasions.
