= Edmund Lanziner =

Italian bobsledder (born 1959)

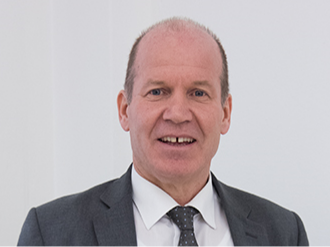

Personal information
- Nationality: Italian
- Born: 3 March 1959 (age 66)

Sport
- Sport: Bobsleigh

Edmund Lanziner (born 3 March 1959) is an Italian bobsledder. He competed in the two man and the four man events at the 1980 Winter Olympics.
