= Kurt Harand =

Austrian ice hockey player

Personal information
- Nationality: Austrian
- Born: 11 September 1957 (age 67); Vienna, Austria

Sport
- Sport: Ice hockey

Kurt Harand (born 11 September 1957) is an Austrian ice hockey player. He competed in the men's tournaments at the 1984 Winter Olympics and the 1988 Winter Olympics.
