= Krasimir Kamenov =

Bulgarian luger (born 1962)

Personal information
- Nationality: Bulgarian
- Born: 25 March 1962 (age 63)

Sport
- Sport: Luge

Krasimir Kamenov (Bulgarian: Красимир Каменов) (born 25 March 1962) is a Bulgarian luger. He competed in the men's doubles event at the 1988 Winter Olympics.
