= Bernard Hutz =

Austrian ice hockey player

Personal information
- Nationality: Austrian
- Born: 30 April 1961 (age 63); Kitchener, Ontario, Canada

Sport
- Sport: Ice hockey

Bernard Hutz (born 30 April 1961) is an Austrian ice hockey player. He competed in the men's tournaments at the 1984 Winter Olympics and the 1988 Winter Olympics.
