= Juris Eisaks =

Latvian luger (born 1958)

Juris Eisaks (born 23 March 1958) is a Soviet (Latvian) luger who competed in the early 1980s. He is best known for finishing third in the men's doubles overall Luge World Cup in 1981-2.

Eisaks also finished seventh in the men's doubles event at the 1984 Winter Olympics in Sarajevo.
