= Franz Paulweber =

Austrian bobsledder

Personal information
- Nationality: Austrian
- Born: 6 January 1953 Fulpmes, Austria
- Died: 1 January 2024 (aged 70)

Sport
- Sport: Bobsleigh

Franz Paulweber (6 January 1953 – 1 January 2024) was an Austrian bobsledder. He competed in the two man and the four man events at the 1980 Winter Olympics.
