= Martin Platzer =

Austrian ice hockey player

Personal information
- Nationality: Austrian
- Born: 24 September 1963 (age 63) Villach, Austria

Sport
- Sport: Ice hockey

Martin Platzer (born 24 September 1963) is an Austrian ice hockey player. He competed in the men's tournaments at the 1984 Winter Olympics and the 1988 Winter Olympics.
