= Helmut Petrik =

Austrian ice hockey player

Personal information
- Nationality: Austrian
- Born: 16 May 1961 (age 64) Villach, Austria

Sport
- Sport: Ice hockey

Helmut Petrik (born 16 May 1961) is an Austrian ice hockey player. He competed in the men's tournament at the 1984 Winter Olympics.
