= Andreas Gumpold =

Austrian cross-country skier (born 1961)

Personal information
- Nationality: Austrian
- Born: 31 March 1961 (age 63); Innsbruck, Austria

Sport
- Sport: Cross-country skiing

Andreas Gumpold (born 31 March 1961) is an Austrian cross-country skier. He competed in the men's 15 kilometre event at the 1984 Winter Olympics.
