= Corrie Brown =

British bobsledder

Personal information
- Nationality: British
- Born: 16 August 1949; London, England
- Died: 18 January 2007 (aged 57)

Sport
- Sport: Bobsleigh

Corrie Brown (16 August 1949 – 18 January 2007) was a British bobsledder. He competed at the 1980 Winter Olympics and the 1984 Winter Olympics.
