= Stefan Ilsanker (luger) =

German luger (born 1965)

Medal record

Men's Luge

Representing West Germany

World Championships
| Silver medal – second place | 1987 Igls | Men's doubles |

World Cup Championships
| Silver medal – second place | 1986-87 | Men's doubles |
| Silver medal – second place | 1987-88 | Men's doubles |
| Bronze medal – third place | 1985-86 | Men's doubles |
| Bronze medal – third place | 1989-90 | Men's doubles |

European Championships
| Silver medal – second place | 1990 Igls | Mixed team |

Stefan Ilsanker (born 6 July 1965) is a German luger who competed for West Germany from the late 1980s to the early 1990s. He won the silver medal in the men's doubles event at the 1987 FIL World Luge Championships in Igls, Austria.

Ilsanker also won a silver medal in the mixed team event at the 1990 FIL European Luge Championships in Igls. He also finished fourth in the men's doubles event at the 1988 Winter Olympics in Calgary.

Ilsanker's best overall Luge World Cup finish was second twice in men's doubles (1986-7, 1987-8).
