= Adriano Darioli =

Italian biathlete (born 1956)

Personal information
- Nationality: Italian
- Born: 14 January 1956 (age 69); Bognanco, Italy

Sport
- Sport: Biathlon

Adriano Darioli (born 14 January 1956) is an Italian former biathlete. He competed at the 1980 Winter Olympics and the 1984 Winter Olympics.
