= Leopold Sivec =

Austrian ice hockey player

Personal information
- Nationality: Austrian
- Born: 3 August 1958 (age 68) Villach, Austria

Sport
- Sport: Ice hockey

Leopold Sivec (born 3 August 1958) is an Austrian ice hockey player. He competed in the men's tournament at the 1984 Winter Olympics.
