= Gerd Zaunschirm =

Austrian bobsledder

Personal information
- Nationality: Austrian
- Born: 15 February 1955 (age 70); Innsbruck, Austria

Sport
- Sport: Bobsleigh

Gerd Zaunschirm (born 15 February 1955) is an Austrian bobsledder. He competed at the 1976 Winter Olympics and the 1980 Winter Olympics.
