= Annefried Göllner =

Austrian luger

Personal information
- Nationality: Austrian
- Born: 27 August 1963 (age 62) Zams, Austria

Sport
- Sport: Luge

Annefried Göllner (born 27 August 1963) is an Austrian luger. She competed at the 1980 Winter Olympics and the 1984 Winter Olympics.
