= Einārs Veikša =

Latvian luger (born 1961)

Einārs Veikša (born 10 January 1961 in Tukums), also known as Eynars Veyksha (Russian: Эйнарс Вейкша), is a Latvian-Soviet luger who competed in the early 1980s. He is best known for finishing third in the men's doubles overall Luge World Cup in 1981-2.

Veiksha also finished seventh in the men's doubles event at the 1984 Winter Olympics in Sarajevo.
