= Franz Gattermann =

Austrian cross-country skier (born 1955)

Personal information
- Nationality: Austrian
- Born: 25 May 1955 (age 70) Ried im Innkreis, Austria

Sport
- Sport: Cross-country skiing

Franz Gattermann (born 25 May 1955) is an Austrian cross-country skier. He competed at the 1976 Winter Olympics and the 1984 Winter Olympics.
