= Peter Gschnitzer =

Italian luger (born 1953)

Medal record

Luge

Representing Italy

Olympic Games
Silver medal – second place	1980 Lake Placid	Men's doubles

World Championships
Silver medal – second place	1977 Igls	Men's doubles

European Championships
Bronze medal – third place	1979 Oberhof	Men's doubles

Peter Gschnitzer (born 10 July 1953 in Sterzing) was an Italian luger who competed during the late 1970s and early 1980s. He won the silver medal in the men's doubles event at the 1980 Winter Olympics in Lake Placid, New York.

Gschnitzer also won a silver medal in the men's doubles event at the 1977 FIL World Luge Championships in Igls, Austria. He also won a bronze medal in the men's doubles event at the 1979 FIL European Luge Championships in Oberhof, East Germany.

Gschnitzer also won the overall Luge World Cup title in men's doubles in the first two seasons of the World Cup's existence (1977-8, 1978-9).
