= Kurt Oberhöller =

Austrian bobsledder

Personal information
- Nationality: Austrian
- Born: 27 January 1950 (age 75); Innsbruck, Austria

Sport
- Sport: Bobsleigh

Kurt Oberhöller (born 27 January 1950) is an Austrian bobsledder. He competed at the 1976 Winter Olympics and the 1980 Winter Olympics.
