= Dimitriy Alekseyev =

Russian luger (born 1966)

Dmitry Alekseyev
Personal information
- Nationality: Russian
- Born: 31 January 1966 (age 60) Moscow, Russian SFSR, Soviet Union

Sport
- Sport: Luge
Medal record
World Championships
Bronze medal – third place	1985 Oberhof	Men's doubles

Dmitry Alekseyev (born 31 January 1966) is a Soviet and Russian luger. He competed in the men's doubles event at the 1988 Winter Olympics. He won the bronze medal in the men's doubles event at the 1985 FIL World Luge Championships in Oberhof, East Germany.
