= Johann Fritz (ice hockey) =

Austrian ice hockey player

Personal information
- Nationality: Austrian
- Born: 6 February 1958 (age 67); Klagenfurt, Austria

Sport
- Sport: Ice hockey

Johann Fritz (born 6 February 1958) is an Austrian ice hockey player. He competed in the men's tournament at the 1984 Winter Olympics.
