= Reinhold Sulzbacher =

Austrian luger (born 1944)

Medal record

Luge

European Championships
Gold medal – first place	1982 Winterberg	Men's doubles

Reinhold Sulzbacher (born 29 July 1944 in Liezen) was an Austrian luger who competed in the late 1970s and early 1980s. He won the gold medal in the men's doubles event at the 1982 FIL European Luge Championships in Winterberg, West Germany.

Sulzbacher also won the men's doubles overall Luge World Cup title three times (1979–80, 1980–1, 1981-2).

Competing in two Winter Olympics, Sulzbacher earned his best finish of fifth in the men's doubles event at Innsbruck in 1976.
