= Franz Wilhelmer =

Austrian luger (born 1960)

Franz Wilhelmer (born 29 July 1960) is an Austrian luger who competed in the early 1980s. He is best known for finishing second three times in the men's doubles overall Luge World Cup (1981-2, 1983-4, 1984-5).

Wilhemer also finished fourth in the men's doubles event at the 1984 Winter Olympics in Sarajevo.
