= Aleksandr Belyakov (luger) =

Soviet luger (born 1962)

Medal record

Luge

Olympic Games
Silver medal – second place	1984 Sarajevo	Men's doubles

World Championships
Bronze medal – third place	1989 Winterberg	Mixed team

European Championships
Gold medal – first place	1986 Hammarstrand	Men's doubles
Bronze medal – third place	1988 Königssee	Men's doubles

Aleksandr Belyakov (born 26 June 1962) was a Soviet luger who competed in the mid-1980s. Competing in two Winter Olympics, he won the silver medal in the men's doubles event at Sarajevo in 1984.

Belyakov also won a bronze in the mixed team event at the 1989 FIL World Luge Championships in Winterberg, West Germany. At the FIL European Luge Championships, he won two medals in the men's doubles event with a gold in 1986 and a bronze in 1988.

Belyakov won the overall Luge World Cup men's doubles title in 1987-8.
