= Franz Lechleitner =

Austrian luger (born 1963)

Personal information
- Nationality: Austrian
- Born: 11 September 1963 (age 62) Zams, Austria

Sport
- Sport: Luge

Franz Lechleitner (born 11 September 1963) is an Austrian luger. He competed at the 1984 Winter Olympics and the 1988 Winter Olympics.
