= Gerhard Sandbichler =

Austrian luger (1957–2023)

Gerhard Sandbichler (14 August 1957 – 21 June 2023) was an Austrian luger who competed from the late 1970s to the late 1980s. He is best known for his third place overall Luge World Cup finish in men's singles in 1984-5. Competing in three Winter Olympics, Sandbichler earned his best finish of fifth in the men's singles event at Lake Placid in 1980.
