= Günther Lemmerer =

Austrian luger (born 1952)

Medal record

Luge

Representing Austria

European Championships
Gold medal – first place	1982 Winterberg	Men's doubles

Günther Lemmerer (born 4 April 1952, in Graz) is an Austrian luger who competed in the early 1980s. He won the gold medal in the men's doubles event at the 1982 FIL European Luge Championships in Winterberg, West Germany.

Competing in two Winter Olympics, Lemmerer earned his best finish of fifth in the men's doubles event at Sarajevo in 1984.

He won the men's doubles overall Luge World Cup title three times (1979–80, 1980–1, 1981–2).

After retiring from competition in the mid-1980s, Lemmerer became a development coach for the International Luge Federation (FIL), developing luge teams from Greece, Bermuda, India, Somalia, Argentina, and Venezuela. Several of those teams competed at the 1998 Winter Olympics in Nagano and 2002 Winter Olympics in Salt Lake City, Utah, U.S.A., but did not medal in any luge event.
