= Georg Fluckinger =

Austrian luger (born 1955)

Olympic medal record

Men's luge
Bronze medal – third place	1980 Lake Placid	Men's doubles

Georg Fluckinger (born 1 March 1955) was an Austrian luger who competed in the late 1970s and early 1980s. Competing in three Winter Olympics, he won the bronze medal in the men's doubles event at Lake Placid in 1980.

In Luge World Cup, Fluckinger's best overall seasonal finish was second in men's doubles on five occasions (1978-9, 1979–80, 1981-2, 1983-4, 1984-5). He also finished third overall in the men's single World Cup championship in 1979-80.
