= United States at the 1980 Winter Olympics =

- Flag of the United States
- IOC code: USA
- NOC: United States Olympic Committee

in Lake Placid
- Competitors: 101 (76 men, 25 women) in 6 sports
- Flag bearer: Scott Hamilton (opening)
- Medals Ranked 3rd: Gold 6 Silver 4 Bronze 2 Total 12

Winter Olympics appearances (overview)
- 1924; 1928; 1932; 1936; 1948; 1952; 1956; 1960; 1964; 1968; 1972; 1976; 1980; 1984; 1988; 1992; 1994; 1998; 2002; 2006; 2010; 2014; 2018; 2022; 2026

The United States was the host nation for the 1980 Winter Olympics in Lake Placid, New York.

== Medalists ==
The following U.S. competitors won medals at the games. In the by discipline sections below, medalists' names are bolded.

Medal	Name	Sport	Event	Date
Gold	Eric Heiden	Speed skating	Men's 500 meters	February 15
Gold	Eric Heiden	Speed skating	Men's 5000 meters	February 16
Gold	Eric Heiden	Speed skating	Men's 1000 meters	February 19
Gold	Eric Heiden	Speed skating	Men's 1500 meters	February 21
Gold	Eric Heiden	Speed skating	Men's 10,000 meters	February 23
Gold	United States men's national ice hockey team: Bill Baker; Neal Broten; Dave Christian; Steve Christoff; Jim Craig; Mike Eruzione; John Harrington; Mark Johnson; Rob McClanahan; Ken Morrow; Jack O'Callahan; Mike Ramsey; Mark Pavelich; Steve Janaszak; Buzz Schneider; Dave Silk; Eric Strobel; Bob Suter; Phil Verchota; Mark Wells	Ice hockey	Men's tournament	February 24
Silver	Leah Poulos-Mueller	Speed skating	Women's 500 meters	February 15
Silver	Leah Poulos-Mueller	Speed skating	Women's 1000 meters	February 17
Silver	Phil Mahre	Alpine skiing	Men's slalom	February 19
Silver	Linda Fratianne	Figure skating	Women's singles	February 23
Bronze	Beth Heiden	Speed skating	Women's 3000 meters	February 20
Bronze	Charles Tickner	Figure skating	Men's singles	February 21

Medals by sport
Sport	1st place, gold medalist(s)	2nd place, silver medalist(s)	3rd place, bronze medalist(s)	Total
Speed skating	5	2	1	**8**
Ice hockey	1	0	0	**1**
Figure skating	0	1	1	**2**
Alpine skiing	0	1	0	**1**
Total	6	4	2	12

Medals by gender
Gender	1st place, gold medalist(s)	2nd place, silver medalist(s)	3rd place, bronze medalist(s)	Total	Percentage
Male	6	1	1	**8**	66.7%
Female	0	3	1	**4**	33.3%
Total	6	4	2	12	100%

Multiple medalists
Name	Sport	1st place, gold medalist(s)	2nd place, silver medalist(s)	3rd place, bronze medalist(s)	Total
Eric Heiden	Speed skating	5	0	0	**5**
Leah Poulos-Mueller	Speed skating	0	2	0	**2**

== Alpine skiing ==
Men

Athlete	Event	Run 1		Run 2		Total	
Athlete	Event	Time	Rank	Time	Rank	Time	Rank
Karl Anderson	Downhill	—N/a				DNF	
Phil Mahre	Downhill	—N/a				1:48.88	14
Andy Mill	Downhill	—N/a				1:49.07	16
Pete Patterson	Downhill	—N/a				1:47.04	5
Cary Adgate	Giant slalom	1:22.48	23	DNF			
Phil Mahre	Giant slalom	1:21.74	14	1:22.59	10	2:44.33	10
Steve Mahre	Giant slalom	1:21.86	15	1:23.08	15	2:44.94	15
Pete Patterson	Giant slalom	DNF					
Phil Mahre	Slalom	53.31	1	51.45	8	1:44.76	2nd place, silver medalist(s)
Steve Mahre	Slalom	DNF					
Pete Patterson	Slalom	DNF					
Bill Taylor	Slalom	DNF					

Women

Athlete	Event	Run 1		Run 2		Total	
Athlete	Event	Time	Rank	Time	Rank	Time	Rank
Holly Flanders	Downhill	—N/a				1:40.96	14
Cindy Nelson	Downhill	—N/a				1:39.69	7
Heidi Preuss	Downhill	—N/a				1:39.51	4
Christin Cooper	Giant slalom	1:16.61	9	1:28.10	7	2:44.71	7
Tamara McKinney	Giant slalom	DNF					
Cindy Nelson	Giant slalom	1:17.42	13	1:29.90	14	2:47.32	13
Heidi Preuss	Giant slalom	1:17.54	15	1:30.83	20	2:48.37	17
Abbi Fisher	Slalom	45.10	14	DNF			
Christin Cooper	Slalom	44.23	7	45.05	7	1:29.28	8
Tamara McKinney	Slalom	DNF					
Cindy Nelson	Slalom	44.96	12	45.89	13	1:30.85	11

== Biathlon ==
Athlete	Event	Time	Misses	Rank
Martin Hagen	Individual	1:21:02.95	8 (0+4+4+0)	36
Glenn Jobe	Individual	1:21:36.52	6 (1+0+0+5)	38
Johnny Ruger	Individual	1:33:30.80	21 (8+4+6+3)	45
Peter Hoag	Sprint	38:53.44	4 (2+2)	45
Lyle Nelson	Sprint	35:40.56	2 (1+1)	19
Donald Nielsen	Sprint	38:51.02	6 (2+4)	44
Peter Hoag; Martin Hagen; Lyle Nelson; Donald Nielsen	Relay	1:39:24.29	13 (0+5 0+8)	8

== Bobsleigh ==
Athlete	Event	Run 1		Run 2		Run 3		Run 4		Total	
Athlete	Event	Time	Rank	Time	Rank	Time	Rank	Time	Rank	Time	Rank
Brent Rushlaw; Joe Tyler	Two-man	1:02.90	5	1:02.81	3	1:02.99	5	1:03.42	8	4:12.12	6
Howard Siler; Dick Nalley	Two-man	1:03.04	6	1:03.04	6	1:02.65	2	1:03.00	5	4:11.73	5
Bob Hickey; Jeff Jordan; Willie Davenport; Jeff Gadley	Four-man	1:01.49	12	1:01.81	14	1:01.04	13	1:01.77	14	4:06.11	12
Howard Siler; Joe Tyler; Jeff Jost; Dick Nalley	Four-man	1:01.49	12	1:01.69	13	1:01.30	14	1:01.72	12	4:06.20	13

== Cross-country skiing ==
Men

Athlete	Event	Time	Rank
Tim Caldwell	15 km	44:30.41	25
Stan Dunklee	15 km	44:03.84	22
Jim Galanes	15 km	44:46.48	33
Bill Koch	15 km	43:38.56	16
Stan Dunklee	30 km	1:33:48.02	30
Jim Galanes	30 km	1:36:15.17	41
Bill Koch	30 km	DNF	
Doug Peterson	30 km	1:38:29.86	45
Stan Dunklee	50 km	2:42:20.20	33
Jim Galanes	50 km	2:37:09.64	20
Bill Koch	50 km	2:34:31.62	13
Doug Peterson	50 km	DNF	
Tim Caldwell; Stan Dunklee; Jim Galanes; Bill Koch	4 × 10 km relay	2:04:12.17	8

Women

Athlete	Event	Time	Rank
Leslie Bancroft-Krichko	5 km	16:39.71	33
Betsy Haines	5 km	17:27.75	37
Beth Paxson	5 km	16:20.93	26
Alison Owen-Spencer	5 km	16:05.04	22
Leslie Bancroft-Krichko	10 km	33:04.71	28
Beth Paxson	10 km	33:01.60	25
Alison Owen-Spencer	10 km	32:41.33	22
Lynn von der Heide-Spencer-Galanes	10 km	33:13.89	31
Leslie Bancroft-Krichko; Alison Owen-Spencer; Beth Paxson; Lynn von der Heide-Spencer-Galanes	4 × 5 km relay	1:06:55.41	7

== Figure skating ==
Individual

Athlete	Event	CF	SP	FS	Total		
Athlete	Event	Rank	Rank	Rank	Points	Places	Rank
Scott Hamilton	Men's singles	8	4	4	181.78	45	5
David Santee	Men's singles	3	3	5	185.52	34	4
Charles Tickner	Men's singles	2	5	3	187.06	28	3rd place, bronze medalist(s)
Lisa-Marie Allen	Ladies' singles	8	3	4	179.42	45	5
Linda Fratianne	Ladies' singles	3	1	2	188.30	16	2nd place, silver medalist(s)
Sandy Lenz	Ladies' singles	11	6	7	172.74	82	9

Mixed

Athlete	Event	SP / CD	FS / FD	Total		
Athlete	Event	Rank	Rank	Points	Places	Rank
Tai Babilonia; Randy Gardner	Pairs	DNS				
Kitty Carruthers; Peter Carruthers	Pairs	5	5	137.38	46	5
Sheryl Franks; Michael Botticelli	Pairs	7	7	133.84	64	7
Judy Blumberg; Michael Seibert	Ice dancing	7	7	190.30	66	7
Stacey Smith; John Summers	Ice dancing	8	8	188.38	75	9

== Ice hockey ==
Summary

Team	Event	First round						Consolation game	Final round		
Team	Event	Opposition score	Opposition score	Opposition score	Opposition score	Opposition score	Rank	Opposition score	Opposition score	Opposition score	Rank
United States men	Men's tournament	Sweden; T 2-2	Czechoslovakia; W 7–3	Norway; W 5–1	Romania; W 7–2	West Germany; W 4–2	1 Q	Bye	Soviet Union; W 4–3	Finland; W 4–2	1st place, gold medalist(s)

Roster

- Bill Baker – A
- Neal Broten
- Dave Christian
- Steve Christoff
- Jim Craig
- Mike Eruzione – C
- John Harrington
- Steve Janaszak
- Mark Johnson
- Rob McClanahan
- Ken Morrow
- Jack O'Callahan
- Mark Pavelich
- Mike Ramsey
- Buzz Schneider
- Dave Silk
- Eric Strobel
- Bob Suter
- Phil Verchota
- Mark Wells

First Round

Team	Pld	W	L	D	GF	GA	GD	Pts	Qualification
Sweden	5	4	0	1	26	7	+19	9	Advanced to the final round
United States	5	4	0	1	25	10	+15	9	Advanced to the final round
Czechoslovakia	5	3	2	0	34	16	+18	6	Advanced to the consolation round
Romania	5	1	3	1	13	29	−16	3	
West Germany	5	1	4	0	21	30	−9	2	
Norway	5	0	4	1	9	36	−27	1	

Source: HockeyCanada.ca

All times are local (UTC-5).

12 February 1980; 17:21	Sweden	2–2 (1–0, 0–1, 1–1)	United States	Olympic Fieldhouse, Lake Placid

Referee:
(Soviet Union) Viktor Dombrovski

Andersson (Molin, Lundqvist) – 11:04	1 – 0
	1 – 1	39:32 – Silk (Ramsey, Johnson)
T. Eriksson (Lückner) – 44:45	2 – 1
	2 – 2	59:33 – Baker (Pavelich, Schneider)(EA)

8 min
Penalties
6 min
36
Shots
29

14 February 1980; 20:30	United States	7–3 (2–2, 2–0, 3–1)	Czechoslovakia	Olympic Fieldhouse, Lake Placid

Referee:
(Sweden) Ulf Lindgren

	0 – 1	02:23 – Pouzar (Kaberle, Nový)
Eruzione (Broten) – 4:39	1 – 1
Pavelich (Schneider, Harrington) – 5:45	2 – 1
	2 – 2	12:07 – M. Šťastný (P. Šťastný)
Schneider (Pavelich) – 24:33	3 – 2
Johnson (McClanahan) – 35:28	4 – 2
Verchota (Christian) – 42:59	5 – 2
Schneider (Harrington) – 43:59	6 – 2
	6 – 3	45:36 – Novák (Lukáč)
McClanahan (Johnson) – 50:54	7 – 3

10 min
Penalties
10 min
27
Shots
31

16 February 1980; 13:00	United States	5–1 (0–1, 3–0, 2–0)	Norway	Olympic Arena, Lake Placid

Referee:
(Finland) Karl-Gustav Kaisla

	0 – 1	04:19 – Myhre (Løsåmoen)
Eruzione (PP) – 20:41	1 – 1
Johnson (Christian, McClanahan) – 24:51	2 – 1
Silk (Pavelich, Morrow) – 33:31	3 – 1
Wells (Silk, Verchota) – 44:28	4 – 1
Morrow (McClanahan, Strobel) – 51:29	5 – 1

16 min
Penalties
18 min
43
Shots
22

18 February 1980; 20:30	United States	7–2 (2–0, 2–1, 3–1)	Romania	Olympic Fieldhouse, Lake Placid

Referee:
(Soviet Union) Viktor Dombrovski

Schneider (Pavelich, Harrington) – 12:03	1 – 0
Strobel (Schneider, Ramesy) – 15:52	2 – 0
Wells (Verchota, Morrow) – 29:34	3 – 0
	3 – 1	33:40 – Tureanu (Nistor) (PP)
Schneider (Harrington) – 37:05	4 – 1
Christoff (O'Callahan) (PP) – 43:14	5 – 1
	5 – 2	52:48 – Hălăucă (Moroșan)
Broten (Eruzione) – 56:12	6 – 2
McClanahan (Johnson) – 58:09	7 – 2

6 min
Penalties
10 min
51
Shots
21

20 February 1980; 20:30	West Germany	2–4 (2–0, 0–2, 0–2)	United States	Olympic Fieldhouse, Lake Placid

Referee:
(Canada) Bernie Haley

Kretschmer – 01:50	1 – 0
Kiessling (Höfner, Kretschmer) (PP) – 19:45	2 – 0
	2 – 1	27:40 – McClanahan (Johnson, Christian)
	2 – 2	38:31 – Broten (Strobel, Eruzione)
	2 – 3	41:17 – McClanahan (Johnson, Christian)
	2 – 4	44:17 – Verchota (Christian, Wells)

8 min
Penalties
16 min
26
Shots
32

Final round

The top two teams from each group played the top two teams from the other group once. The US/Sweden and USSR/Finland results from the first round carried over to this round.

Team	Pld	W	L	D	GF	GA	GD	Pts
United States	3	2	0	1	10	7	+3	5
Soviet Union	3	2	1	0	16	8	+8	4
Sweden	3	0	1	2	7	14	−7	2
Finland	3	0	2	1	7	11	−4	1

Source: HockeyCanada.ca

Head-to-head results carried forward from group matches:

- February 12: Sweden 2–2 USA
- February 18: Finland 2–4 USSR

22 February 1980; 17:00	United States	4–3 (2–2, 0–1, 2–0)	Soviet Union	Olympic Fieldhouse, Lake Placid

Jim Craig
Goalies
Vladislav Tretiak
Vladimir Myshkin
Referee:
(Finland) Karl-Gustav Kaisla

	0 – 1	09:12 – Krutov (Kasatonov)
Schneider (Pavelich) – 14:03	1 – 1
	1 – 2	17:34 – Makarov (A. Golikov)
Johnson (Christian, Silk) – 19:59	2 – 2
	2 – 3	22:18 – Maltsev (Krutov) (PP)
Johnson (Silk) (PP) – 48:39	3 – 3
Eruzione (Pavelich, Harrington) – 50:00	4 – 3

6 min
Penalties
6 min
16
Shots
39

24 February 1980; 11:00	United States	4–2 (0–1, 1–1, 3–0)	Finland	Olympic Fieldhouse, Lake Placid

Referee:
(Czechoslovakia) Vladimir Šubrt

	0 – 1	09:20 – Porvari (Leinonen, Litma)
Christoff – 24:39	1 – 1
	1 – 2	26:30 – Leinonen (Haapalainen, Kiimalainen) (PP)
Verchota (Christian) – 42:25	2 – 2
McClanahan (Johnson, Christian) – 46:05	3 – 2
Johnson (Christoff) (SH) – 56:25	4 – 2

10 min
Penalties
4 min
29
Shots
23

== Luge ==
Men

Athlete	Event	Run 1		Run 2		Run 3		Run 4		Total	
Athlete	Event	Time	Rank	Time	Rank	Time	Rank	Time	Rank	Time	Rank
John Fee	Singles	45.328	21	45.407	15	46.032	20	45.345	15	3:02.112	14
Richard Stithem	Singles	45.418	22	45.938	19	46.245	21	45.491	17	3:03.092	20
Jeff Tucker	Singles	45.158	17	45.311	13	45.427	14	45.400	16	3:01.296	12
Raymond Bateman; Frank Masley	Doubles	48.241	19	40.612	11	—N/a				1:28.853	18
Ty Danco; Richard Healey	Doubles	40.386	12	40.955	12	—N/a				1:21.341	11

Women

Athlete	Event	Run 1		Run 2		Run 3		Run 4		Total	
Athlete	Event	Time	Rank	Time	Rank	Time	Rank	Time	Rank	Time	Rank
Donna Burke	Singles	40.663	19	40.931	17	40.943	16	41.148	21	2:43.685	17
Susan Charlesworth	Singles	41.018	24	DNF							
Debra Genovese	Singles	40.497	16	40.811	16	40.799	15	40.819	15	2:42.926	15

== Nordic combined ==
Athlete	Event	Ski Jumping				Cross-country			Total	
Athlete	Event	Jump 1	Jump 2	Total	Rank	Time	Points	Rank	Points	Rank
Gary Crawford	Individual	78.8	82.9	161.7	29	52:21.3	178.480	25	340.180	28
Mike Devecka	Individual	88.6	85.9	174.5	22	DNF				
Kerry Lynch	Individual	87.6	92.7	180.3	20	49:44.3	202.030	12	382.330	18
Walter Malmquist	Individual	108.4	113.4	221.8	2	52:54.5	173.500	27	395.300	12

== Ski jumping ==
Athlete	Event	Jump 1		Jump 2		Total	
Athlete	Event	Distance	Points	Distance	Points	Points	Rank
Jeff Davis	Normal hill	80.0	105.7	84.0	120.6	226.3	17
Jim Denney	Normal hill	70.0	93.2	75.0	99.7	192.9	36
Jim Maki	Normal hill	81.0	113.8	72.0	94.9	208.7	26
Chris McNeill	Normal hill	79.0	110.1	74.5	102.4	212.5	23
Jeff Davis	Large hill	96.0	99.6	83.0	76.9	176.5	44
Jim Denney	Large hill	109.0	123.8	104.0	115.3	239.1	8
Walter Malmquist	Large hill	97.0	104.0	95.5	101.4	205.4	27
Reed Zuehlke	Large hill	98.0	100.4	79.0	68.8	169.2	45

== Speed skating ==
Men

Athlete	Event	Time	Rank
Jim Chapin	500 m	39.74	24
Eric Heiden	500 m	38.03 OR	1st place, gold medalist(s)
Dan Immerfall	500 m	38.69	5
Eric Heiden	1000 m	1:15.18 OR	1st place, gold medalist(s)
Craig Kressler	1000 m	1:18.37	11
Peter Mueller	1000 m	1:17.11	5
Eric Heiden	1500 m	1:55.44 OR	1st place, gold medalist(s)
Craig Kressler	1500 m	2:00.60	18
Tom Plant	1500 m	2:00.57	17
Eric Heiden	5000 m	7:02.29 OR	1st place, gold medalist(s)
Craig Kressler	5000 m	7:25.43	18
Mike Woods	5000 m	7:10.39	7
Eric Heiden	10,000 m	14:28.13 WR	1st place, gold medalist(s)
Craig Kressler	10,000 m	DNF	
Mike Woods	10,000 m	14:39.53	4

Women

Athlete	Event	Time	Rank
Sarah Docter	500 m	44.48	23
Beth Heiden	500 m	43.18	7
Leah Poulos-Mueller	500 m	42.26	2nd place, silver medalist(s)
Sarah Docter	1000 m	1:28.80	14
Beth Heiden	1000 m	1:27.01	5
Leah Poulos-Mueller	1000 m	1:25.41	2nd place, silver medalist(s)
Mary Docter	1500 m	2:14.74	12
Sarah Docter	1500 m	2:15.11	13
Beth Heiden	1500 m	2:13.10	7
Mary Docter	3000 m	4:39.29	6
Sarah Docter	3000 m	4:43.30	10
Beth Heiden	3000 m	4:33.77	3rd place, bronze medalist(s)
