= Näsström =

Näsström is a Swedish surname. Notable people with the surname include:

- Anders Näsström (born 1964), Swedish luger
- Anneli Näsström (born 1961), Swedish luger, elder sister of Andres Näsström
- Hampus Näsström (born 1994), Swedish footballer
