= Carmel High School (Mundelein, Illinois) =

Private school in Illinois, United States

Carmel Catholic High School
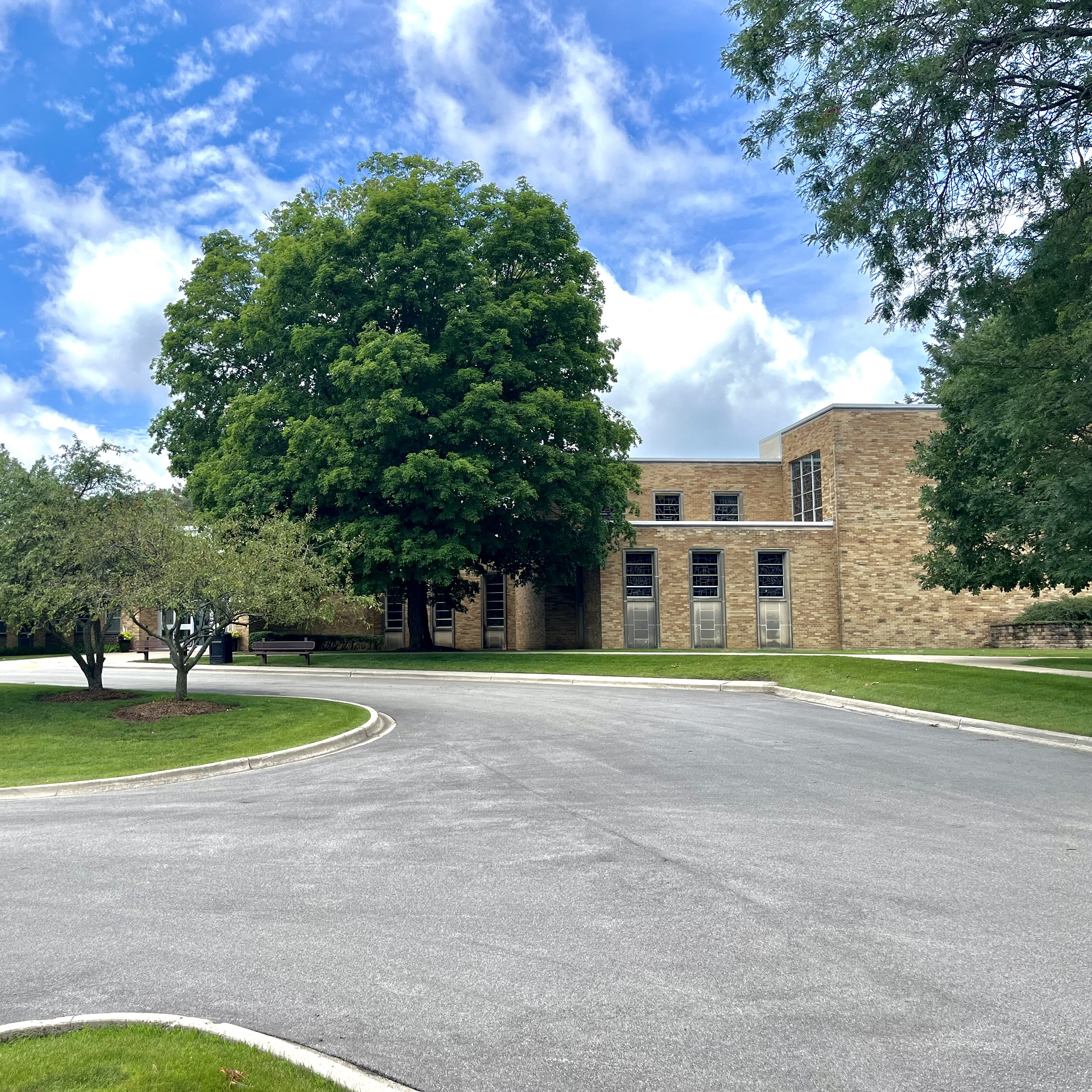

Location
- 1 Carmel Parkway; Mundelein, Illinois 60060; United States; 42°16′19″N 87°59′11″W

Information
- School type: private, coed
- Motto: Belong. Believe. Become.
- Denomination: Roman Catholic
- Established: 1962
- Oversight: Archdiocese of Chicago
- President: Bradley Bonham
- Principal: John Ahlgrim
- Teaching staff: 80.9 (on an FTE basis)
- Grades: 9–12
- Enrollment: 1,150 (2019-2020)
- Student to teacher ratio: 16.3
- Campus: Large suburb
- Colors: brown gold white
- Fight song: "We Are from Carmel"
- Athletics conference: Chicago Catholic League, Girls Catholic Athletic Conference
- Nickname: Corsairs
- Accreditation: North Central Association of Colleges and Schools
- Publication: Harbinger (literary magazine), Colloquium (President's newsletter), Compass(alumni magazine)
- Newspaper: Crossroads
- Yearbook: Spirit
- Tuition: $15,000
- Affiliation: Carmelites; Sisters of Charity of the Blessed Virgin Mary
- Website: www.carmelhs.org

Carmel Catholic High School is a co-educational, college preparatory, Catholic high school run jointly by the priests and brothers of the Order of Carmelites and the Sisters of Charity of the Blessed Virgin Mary. Located in Mundelein, Illinois, Carmel serves all of Lake County and some of the surrounding counties, and southern Wisconsin. An institution of the Roman Catholic Archdiocese of Chicago, Carmel Catholic is one of three Carmelite-run high schools in the Chicago area, the others being Joliet Catholic High School and Mount Carmel High School.

== History ==
In the early 1960s, the Carmelites and the Sisters of Charity were asked to build separate but similar Catholic high schools for the northern part of the Archdiocese of Chicago; an area corresponding roughly to Lake County. The boys school opened in 1962, with the girls school opening the next year. Following a lengthy planning process, the decision was made by the Carmelites and the BVM Sisters to combine the two schools and establish a board of directors. This was done beginning in the 1988–89 school year.

== Awards and recognition ==
In 1985, 1996, 2002, 2007, and 2021 Carmel Catholic High School was recognized with the Blue Ribbon School Award of Excellence by the United States Department of Education.

== Academics ==
The school offers 20 Advanced Placement (AP) courses: Biology, Chemistry, Physics (C: Mechanics), U.S. Government and Politics, U.S. History, European History, World History, English Language, English Literature, Spanish Language, French Language, Latin, Studio Art, Music Theory, Calculus AB, Calculus BC, Computer Science Principles, Computer Science A, Statistics, Psychology, Microeconomics, and Macroeconomics.

== Demographics ==
The demographic breakdown of the 1,318 students enrolled in 2015-16 was:

- Native American/Alaskan - 0.2%
- Asian - 5.0%
- Black - 2.5%
- Hispanic - 6.6%
- White - 80.0%
- Native Hawaiian/Pacific islanders - 0.5%
- Multiracial - 5.2%

== Athletics ==
Carmel's athletic teams are named Corsairs, and the school's colors are brown, gold, and white. Carmel competes in the Chicago Catholic League and Girls Catholic Athletic Conference in its interscholastic athletics program.

The school sponsors both men's and women's teams in basketball, cross country, golf, lacrosse, soccer, swimming, tennis, track and field, and volleyball. The school sponsors men's teams in baseball, football, and wrestling, and women's teams in cheerleading, gymnastics, pom poms, and softball. Although not sponsored by the IHSA, the school also sponsors a men's ice hockey team.

The following teams have won their respective IHSA sponsored state tournament:

- Football: 2003
- Girls gymnastics: 1992, 1993, 2010, 2011, 2012
- Girls soccer: 2015
- Girls basketball: 2022

== Fine arts ==
Carmel Catholic's fine arts program includes chorus, band, drama, and visual arts.

The drama program produces one play and one musical per year. The school's current long-range strategic plan includes the construction of a new fine arts wing by 2012. The Fine Arts wing was opened in 2013. The drama program is a troupe of the International Thespian Society and has had students participate in the Illinois High School Theatre Festival.

The choral program has a number of different choirs for students to join: Concert Choir, Treble Choir, Advanced Choir, as well as one show choir, Cadence, and one jazz/ a cappella group, Parkway Singers.

In the band program there are many different groups: The Jazz Band, Jazz Ensemble, Concert Band and Wind Ensemble. During the football season, the Marching Band plays at all home games and at as many playoff games they can get to.

== Notable alumni ==
- Zaire Barnes (2018) is a professional football linebacker for the New York Giants of the National Football League (NFL).
- Marietta DePrima (1982) is an actress (The Hughleys).
- Sean McGrath (2006) played for the NFL's Los Angeles Chargers
- Brienne Minor (2015) is an NCAA champion tennis player who competed in the 2017 U.S. Open
- Al Salvi (1978) was a former Illinois state legislator and 1996 Republican U.S. Senate nominee
- Chris Salvi (2008) is a former football safety who played for Notre Dame
- Rick Santorum (1976) was a United States senator (R—PA) (1995–2007)
- Scott Stahoviak (1988) was a Major League Baseball first baseman and first round draft pick (1991) for the Minnesota Twins
- Carol Tyler (1969) is an internationally known artist, cartoonist and humorist
- Joe Tyler (1966) was an Olympic athlete who rode as brakeman on USA #1 bobsled in the 1980 Winter Olympics
- Mike Wagner (1967) was an NFL safety for the Pittsburgh Steelers who played for their championship teams in Super Bowls IX, X, XIII, and XIV; he was a member of their "Steel Curtain" defense
- Alex Young (2012) is a pitcher for the Cincinnati Reds of Major League Baseball.
- Jeff Zgonina (1988) was an NFL player for the Houston Texans and is an assistant coach for the San Francisco 49ers
