= Elena Stan =

Romanian luger

Personal information
- Nationality: Romanian
- Born: 7 April 1958 (age 66); Sinaia, Romania

Sport
- Sport: Luge

Elena Stan (born 7 April 1958) is a Romanian luger. She competed in the women's singles event at the 1980 Winter Olympics.
