= Angelika Aukenthaler =

Italian luger

Personal information
- Nationality: Italian
- Born: 7 August 1961 (age 63); Sterzing, Italy

Sport
- Sport: Luge

Angelika Aukenthaler (born 7 August 1961) is an Italian luger. She competed in the women's singles event at the 1980 Winter Olympics.
