= Maria Maioru =

Romanian luger

Personal information
- Nationality: Romanian
- Born: 1 June 1959 (age 65); Sinaia, Romania

Sport
- Sport: Luge

Maria Maioru (born 1 June 1959) is a Romanian luger. She competed in the women's singles event at the 1980 Winter Olympics.
