= Joanna Weaver =

British luger

Personal information
- Nationality: British
- Born: 11 March 1957 (age 68); Chelmsford, England

Sport
- Sport: Luge

Joanna Weaver (born 11 March 1957) is a British luger. She competed in the women's singles event at the 1980 Winter Olympics.
