= Astra Rībena =

Latvian luger (born 1959)

Personal information
- Full name: Astra Rībena-Vītola
- Nationality: Latvian
- Born: 21 June 1959 (age 67) Cēsis, Latvian SSR, Soviet Union

Sport
- Country: Soviet Union
- Sport: Luge

Astra Rībena (-Vītola) (Russian: Астра Рибена (-Витола); born 21 June 1959) is a Latvian luger. She competed for the Soviet Union at the 1980 Winter Olympics in the women's singles event.
