= Danielle Nadeau =

Canadian luger

Personal information
- Born: 11 May 1954 (age 71) Montreal, Quebec, Canada

Sport
- Sport: Luge

Danielle Nadeau (born 11 May 1954) is a Canadian luger. She competed in the women's singles event at the 1980 Winter Olympics.
