= Charles Duke =

American astronaut and lunar explorer (born 1935)

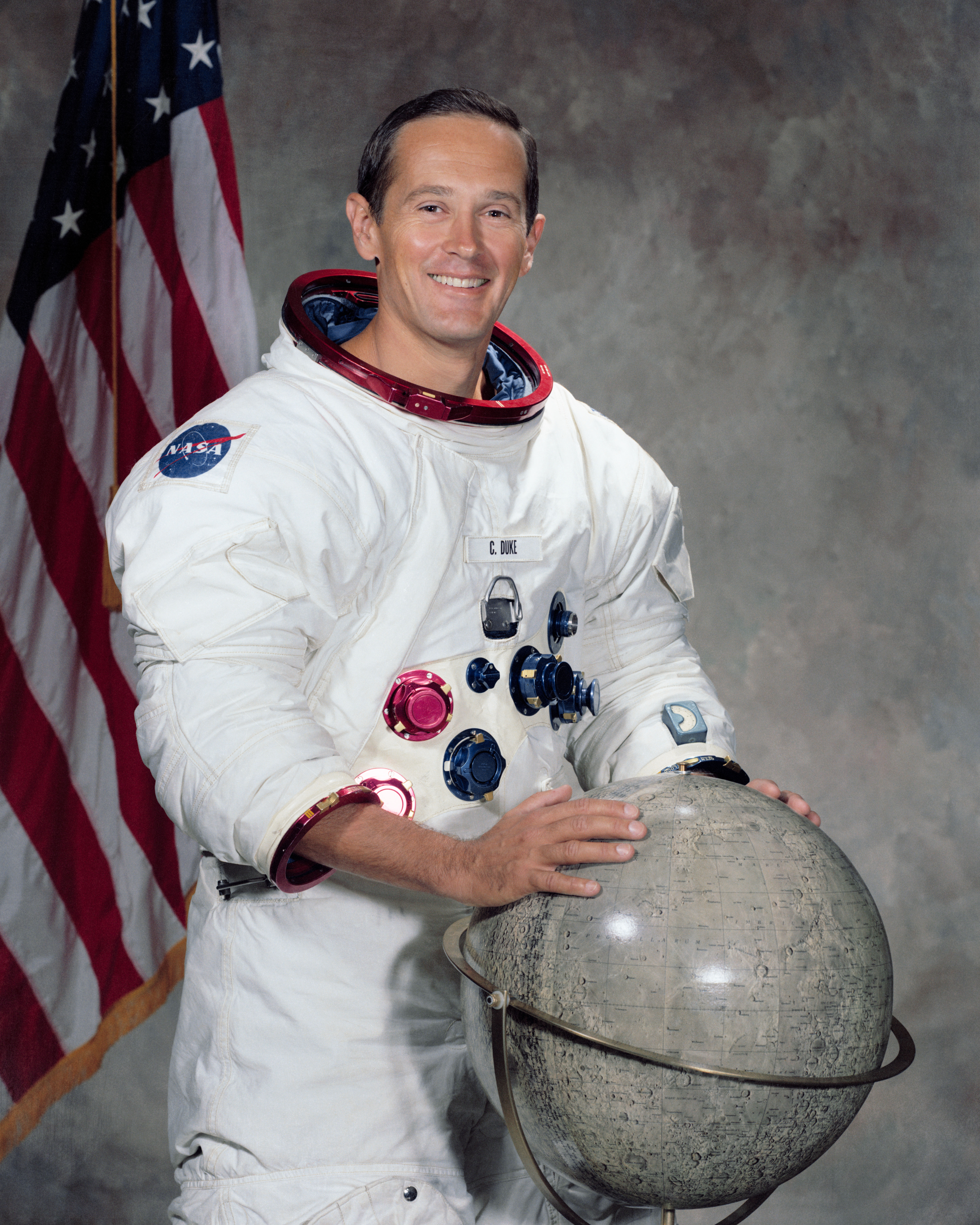
- Duke in September 1971
- Born: Charles Moss Duke Jr. October 3, 1935 (age 91); Charlotte, North Carolina, U.S.
- Education: United States Naval Academy (BS); Massachusetts Institute of Technology (MS)
- Spouse: Dorothy Meade Claiborne (m. 1963)
- Children: 2
- Awards: Air Force Distinguished Service Medal (2); Legion of Merit; NASA Distinguished Service Medal
- Space career

NASA astronaut
- Rank: Brigadier General, USAF
- Time in space: 11d 1h 51m
- Selection: NASA Group 5 (1966)
- Total EVAs: 3
- Total EVA time: 21h 38m
- Mission: Apollo 16
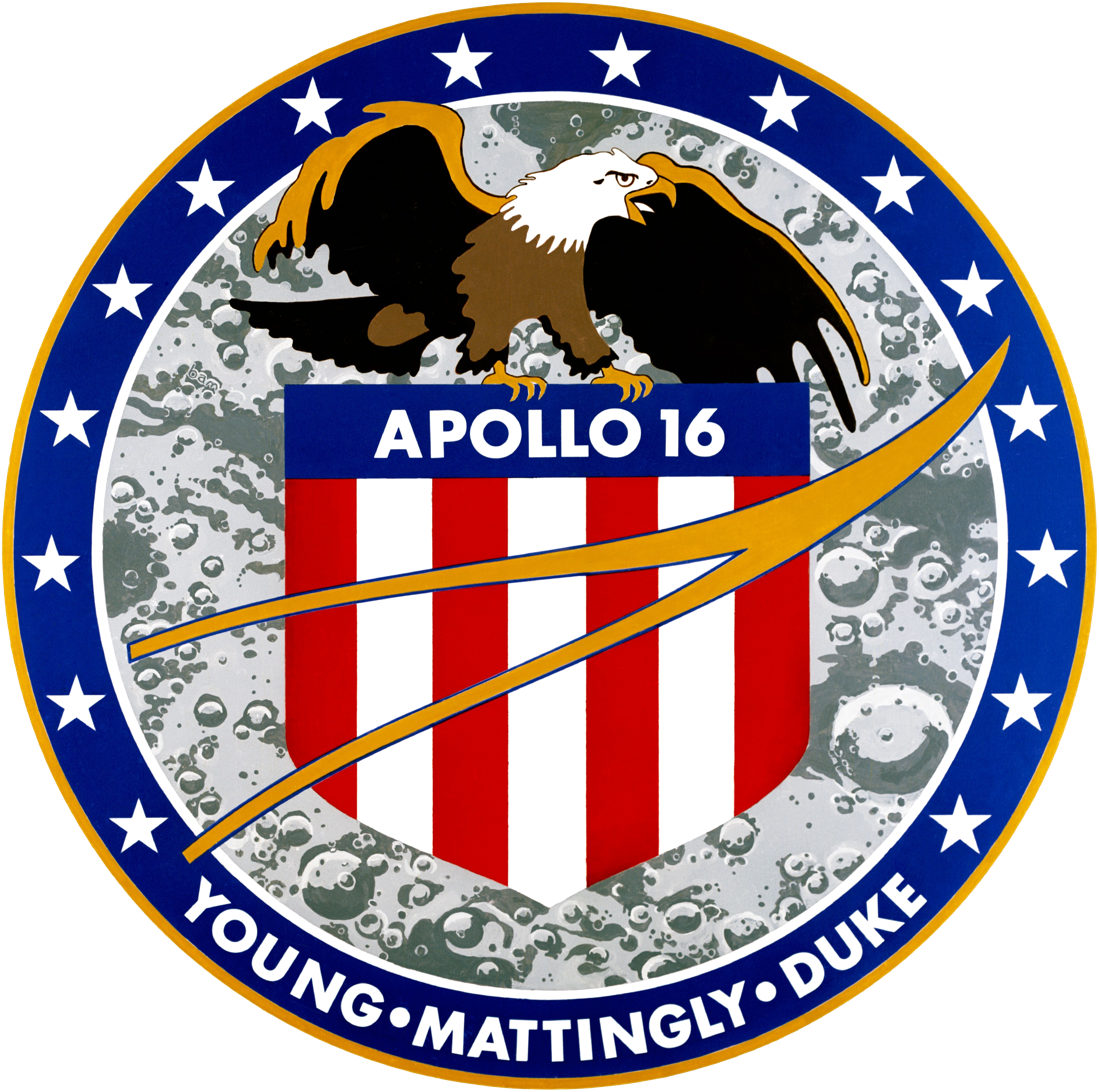
- Mission insignia
- Retired: January 1, 1976
- Charles Duke's voice Recorded September 2013
- Website: Official website

Charles Moss Duke Jr. (born October 3, 1935) is an American former astronaut, United States Air Force (USAF) officer and test pilot who, as Lunar Module pilot of Apollo 16 in 1972, became the 10th and youngest person to walk on the Moon, at age 36 years and 201 days. (Note: As of 2026, Duke remains the youngest person to walk on the Moon.) Duke is one of four surviving Moon walkers, along with David Scott, Buzz Aldrin and Harrison Schmitt.

A 1957 graduate of the United States Naval Academy, Duke joined the USAF and completed advanced flight training on the F-86 Sabre at Moody Air Force Base in Georgia, where he was a distinguished graduate. After completion of this training, Duke served three years as a fighter pilot with the 526th Fighter-Interceptor Squadron at Ramstein Air Base in West Germany. After graduating from the Aerospace Research Pilot School in September 1965, he stayed on as an instructor teaching control systems and flying in the F-101 Voodoo, F-104 Starfighter, and T-33 Shooting Star.

In April 1966, Duke was one of nineteen men selected for NASA's fifth astronaut group. In 1969, he was a member of the astronaut support crew for Apollo 10. He served as CAPCOM for Apollo 11, the first crewed landing on the Moon. His distinctive Southern drawl became familiar to audiences around the world, as the voice of Mission Control concerned by the long landing that almost expended all of the Lunar Module Eagle descent stage's propellant. Duke's first words to the Apollo 11 crew on the surface of the Moon were: "Roger, Twank...Tranquility, we copy you on the ground. You got a bunch of guys about to turn blue. We're breathing again. Thanks a lot!"

Duke was backup Lunar Module pilot on Apollo 13. Shortly before the mission, he caught rubella (German measles) from a friend's child and inadvertently exposed the prime crew to the disease. As Ken Mattingly had no natural immunity to the disease, he was replaced as command module pilot by Jack Swigert. Mattingly was reassigned as command module pilot of Duke's flight, Apollo 16. On this mission, Duke and John Young landed at the Descartes Highlands, and conducted three extravehicular activities (EVAs). He served as backup Lunar Module pilot for Apollo 17. Duke retired from NASA on January 1, 1976.

Following his retirement from NASA, Duke entered the Air Force Reserve and served as a mobilization augmentee to the Commander, USAF Basic Military Training Center, and to the Commander, USAF Recruiting Service. He graduated from the Industrial College of the Armed Forces in 1978. He was promoted to brigadier general in 1979, and retired in June 1986. He has logged 4,147 hours' flying time, of which 3,632 hours were in jet aircraft, and 265 hours were in space, including 21 hours and 38 minutes of EVA.

== Early life and education ==
Charles Moss Duke Jr. was born in Charlotte, North Carolina, on October 3, 1935, the son of Charles Moss Duke, an insurance salesman, and his wife Willie Catherine Duke (née Waters), who worked as a buyer for Best & Co. He was followed six minutes later by his identical twin brother William Waters (Bill) Duke. His mother traced her ancestry back to Colonel Philemon Waters, who fought in the American Revolutionary War.

After the Japanese attack on Pearl Harbor on December 7, 1941, brought the United States into World War II, his father volunteered to join the Navy, and was assigned to Naval Air Station North Island in California. The family moved to California to join him, but after a year he was shipped out to the South Pacific, and Willie took the boys to Johnston, South Carolina, where her mother lived. His father returned from the South Pacific in 1944, and was stationed at Naval Air Station Daytona Beach, so the family moved there. In 1946, after the war ended, they settled in Lancaster, South Carolina, where his father sold insurance, and his mother ran a dress shop. A sister, Elizabeth (Betsy), was born in 1949.

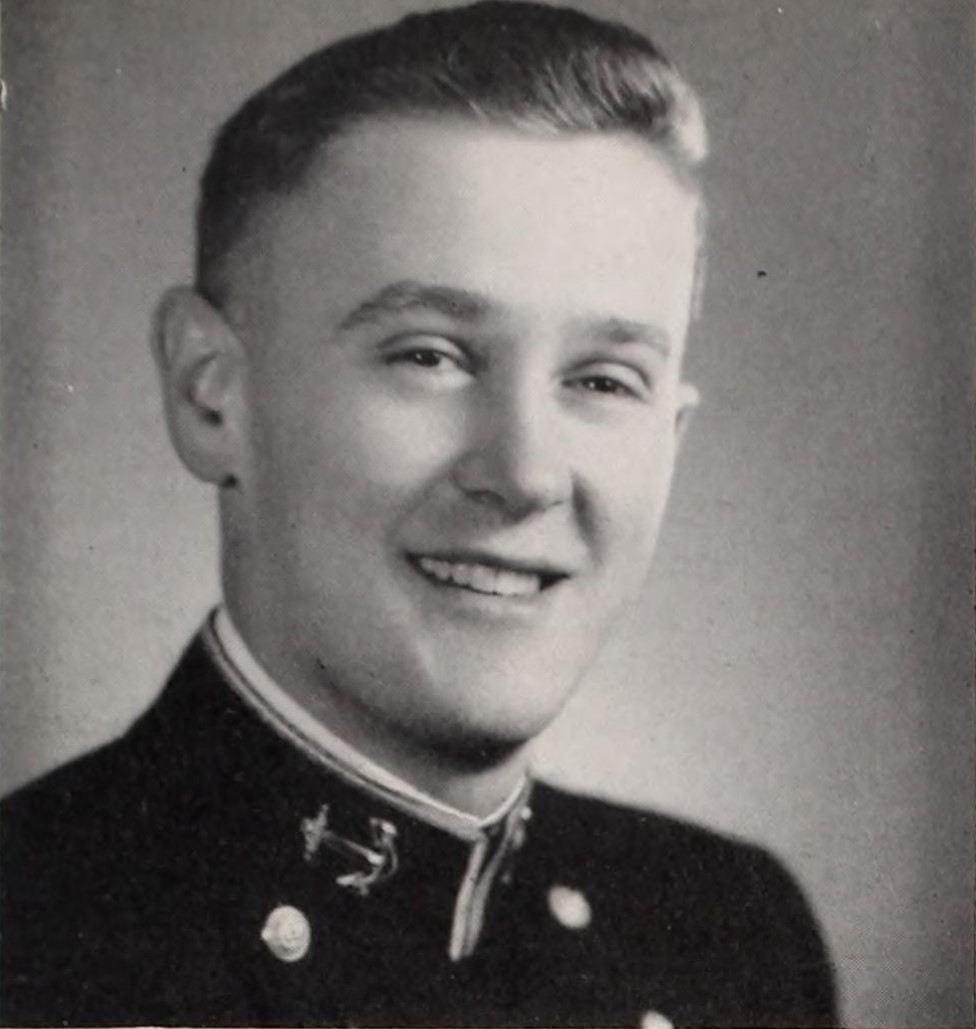
As a U.S. Naval Academy midshipman in 1957

As a boy, Duke and his brother Bill made model aircraft. A congenital heart defect caused Bill to drop out of strenuous sports, and eventually inspired him to pursue a career in medicine, but golf was a sport that they enjoyed together. Duke was active in the Boy Scouts of America and earned its highest rank, Eagle Scout in 1946. He attended Lancaster High School. Duke decided that he would like to pursue a military career. Since his father had served in the Navy, he wanted to go to the United States Naval Academy in Annapolis, Maryland.

As a first step, Duke went to see his local congressman, James P. Richards, who lived in Lancaster. Richards said that he would be pleased to give Duke his nomination, as a local boy. Richards advised Duke that he would still need to pass the entrance examination, and recommended that he attend a military prep school. Duke and his parents accepted this advice, and chose the Admiral Farragut Academy in St. Petersburg, Florida, for his final two years of schooling. Duke sat the examination for Annapolis in the middle of his senior year, and soon after received a letter informing him that he had passed, and had been accepted into the class of 1957. The Lancaster News ran his picture on the front page along with the announcement of his acceptance. He graduated from Farragut as valedictorian and president of the senior class in 1953.

Duke entered the Naval Academy in June 1953. He was no athlete, but played golf for the academy team. During a two-month summer cruise to Europe on the escort carrier USS Siboney, he suffered from seasickness, and began questioning his decision to join the Navy. On the other hand, he greatly enjoyed a familiarization flight in an N3N seaplane, and began thinking of a career in aviation. The United States Air Force Academy had just been established and would not graduate its first class until 1959, so up to a quarter of the Annapolis class were permitted to volunteer for the United States Air Force. In fact, more than a quarter of the class of 1957 did so, and names were drawn from a hat. At his commissioning physical, Duke was shocked to find that he had a minor astigmatism in his right eye, which precluded him from becoming a naval aviator, but the Air Force said that it would still take him. He received a Bachelor of Science degree in naval sciences in June 1957, and was commissioned as a second lieutenant in the Air Force.

== Air Force ==
In July 1957, Duke, along with the other graduates of Annapolis and West Point who had chosen the Air Force, reported to Maxwell Air Force Base in Montgomery, Alabama, for two weeks' orientation. He was then sent to Spence Air Force Base in Moultrie, Georgia, for primary flight training. The first three months involved classwork and training with the T-34 Mentor, while the next three were with the T-28 Trojan; both were propeller-driven aircraft. For the next phase of his training, he went to Webb Air Force Base in Big Spring, Texas, in March 1958 for training with the T-33 Shooting Star, a jet aircraft. He graduated near the top of his class, and received his wings and a certificate identifying him as a distinguished graduate, which gave him a choice of assignments. He chose to become a fighter pilot. He completed six months' advanced training on the F-86 Sabre aircraft at Moody Air Force Base in Valdosta, Georgia, where he was also a distinguished graduate.

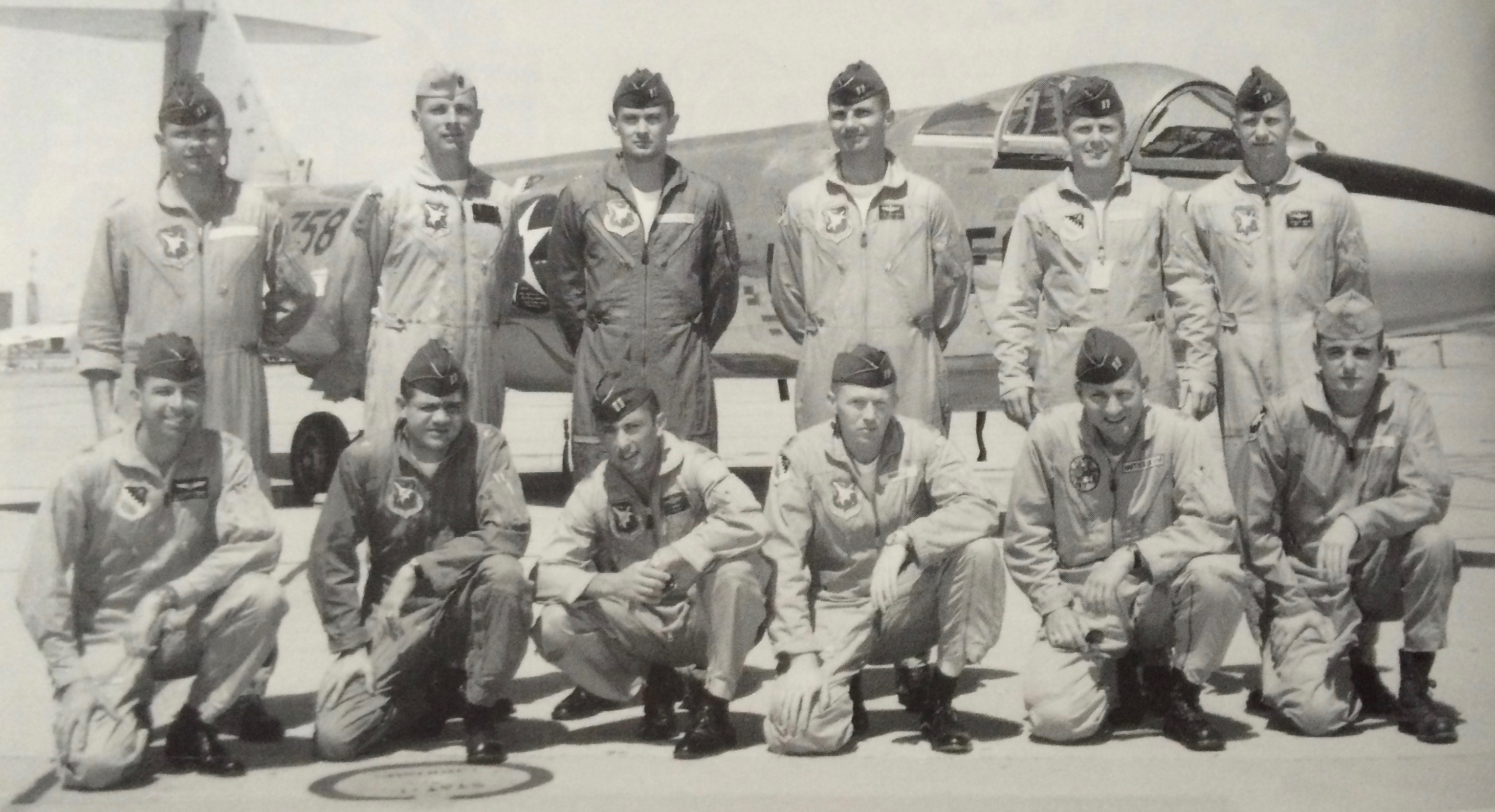
ARPS Class 64-C. Duke is in the back row, third from the left.

Once again, Duke had his choice of assignments, and chose the 526th Fighter-Interceptor Squadron at Ramstein Air Base in West Germany. This was at the height of the Cold War, and tensions ran high, especially during the Berlin Crisis of 1961. Duke chose the assignment precisely because it was the front line. Four of the 526th's F-86 (and later F-102 Delta Dagger) fighter-interceptors were always on alert, ready to scramble and intercept aircraft crossing the border from East Germany.

As his three-year tour of duty in Europe came to an end, Duke considered that his best career option was to further his education, something that the USAF was encouraging. He applied to study aeronautical engineering at North Carolina State University, but this was not available. Instead, he was offered a place at the Massachusetts Institute of Technology (MIT) in its Master of Science degree course in aeronautics and astronautics. He entered MIT in June 1962.

It was in Boston that he met Dotty Meade Claiborne, a graduate of Hollins College and the University of North Carolina, who had recently returned from a summer trip to Europe. They became engaged on Christmas Day, 1962, and were married by her uncle, Randolph Claiborne, the bishop of the Episcopal Diocese of Atlanta, in the Cathedral of Saint Philip, on June 1, 1963. They went to Jamaica for their honeymoon, but came down with food poisoning.

While he was courting Dotty, Duke's grades had slipped, and he was placed on scholastic probation, but the USAF allowed him to enroll for another term. For his dissertation, Duke teamed up with a classmate, Mike Jones, to perform statistical analysis for the Project Apollo guidance systems. As part of this work, they got to meet astronaut Charles Bassett. Their work earned them an A, bringing his average up to the required B, and he was awarded his Master of Science degree in May 1964.

For his next assignment, Duke applied for the USAF Aerospace Research Pilot School (ARPS), although he felt his chances of admission were slim given that he only barely met the minimum qualification. Nonetheless, orders came through for him to attend class 64-C, which commenced in August 1964 at Edwards Air Force Base in California. The commandant at the time was Chuck Yeager, and Duke's twelve-member class included Spence M. Armstrong, Al Worden, Stuart Roosa and Hank Hartsfield. Peter Hoag topped the class; Duke tied for second place. After graduating from ARPS in September 1965, Duke stayed on as an instructor teaching control systems and flying in the F-101 Voodoo, F-104 Starfighter, and T-33 Shooting Star aircraft. While he was stationed at Edwards, his first child, Charles Moss Duke III, was born at the base hospital in March 1965.

== NASA ==
=== Selection and training ===
On September 10, 1965, NASA announced that it was recruiting a fifth group of astronauts. Duke spotted a front-page article in the Los Angeles Times, and realized that he met all the requirements. He went to see Yeager and the deputy commandant, Colonel Robert Buchanan, who informed him that there were two astronaut selections in progress: one for NASA, and one for the USAF's Manned Orbiting Laboratory (MOL) program. Nominations to NASA had to come through Air Force channels, so it got to pre-screen them. Buchanan told Duke that he could apply for both programs, but if he did, MOL would take him. Duke applied only to NASA, as did Roosa and Worden; Hartsfield applied for both and was taken by MOL.

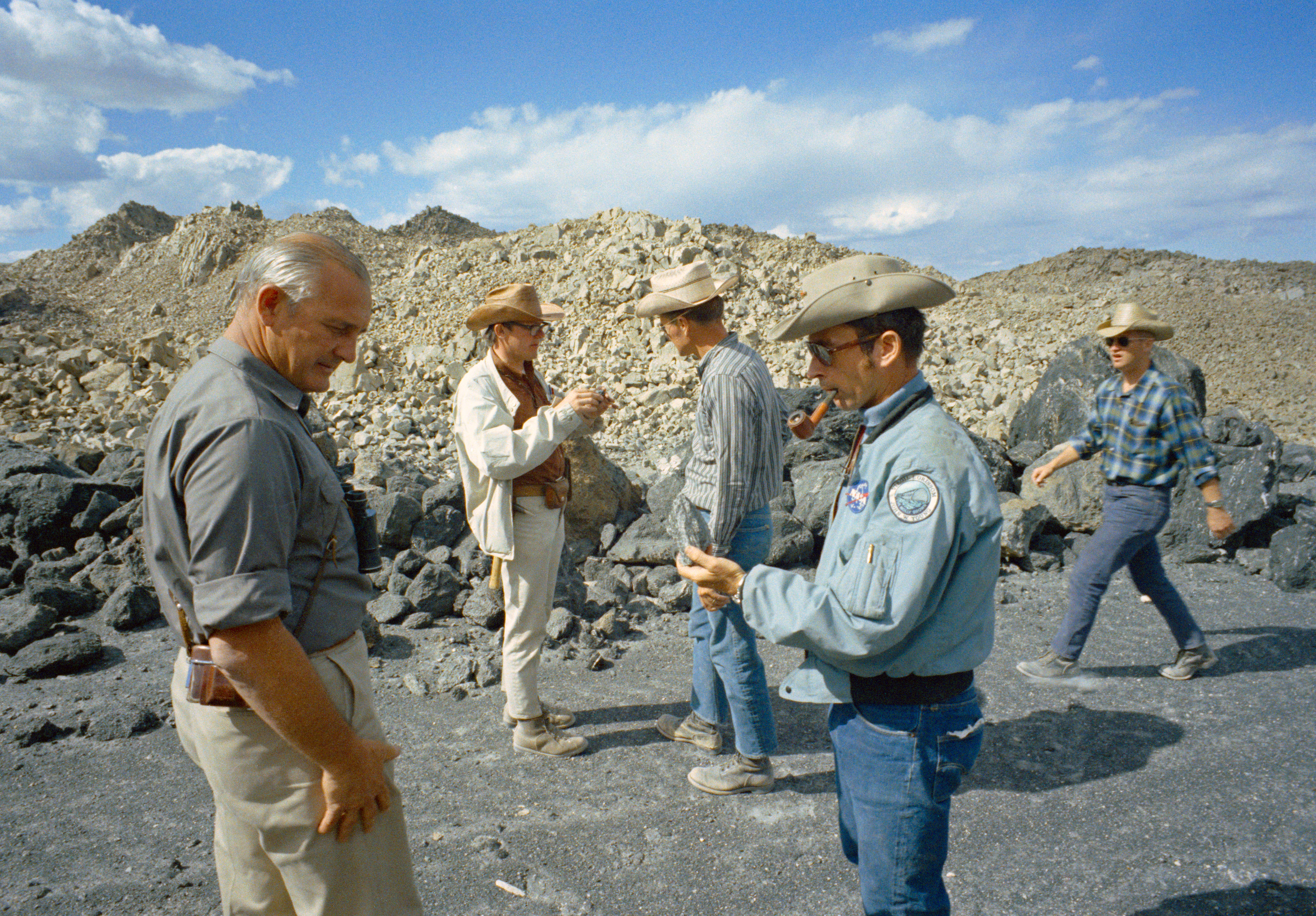
Astronaut geology training. Duke (center) talks to geologist David Wones (second left)

Duke made the list of 44 finalists selected to undergo medical examinations at Brooks Air Force Base at San Antonio, Texas. He arrived there on January 26, 1966, along with two fellow aviators from Edwards, Joe Engle and Bill Pogue. Psychological tests included Rorschach tests; physical ones included encephalograms, and sessions on treadmills and in a human centrifuge. The eye problem that the Naval Academy had reported was not found.

The final stage of the selection process was an interview by the seven-member selection panel. This was chaired by Deke Slayton, with the other members being astronauts Alan Shepard, John Young, Michael Collins and C.C. Williams, NASA test pilot Warren North, and spacecraft designer Max Faget. These were conducted over a week at the Rice Hotel in Houston. In April 1966, a phone call from Slayton informed Duke that he had been selected. NASA officially announced the names of the 19 men selected on April 4, 1966. Young named the group the "Original Nineteen" in a parody of the original Mercury Seven astronauts.

Duke and his family moved to an apartment in League City, Texas, but when Dotty became pregnant again, they bought a vacant lot in El Lago, Texas, next door to astronaut Bill Anders. They met and befriended a young couple, Glenn and Suzanne House. Glenn was an architect, and he agreed to design them a house for $300. Ground was broken in February 1967, but the house was not completed before a second son, Thomas, was born in May.

Astronaut training included four months of studies covering subjects such as astronomy, orbital mechanics and spacecraft systems. Some 30 hours of briefings were conducted on the Apollo command and service module, and twelve on the Apollo Lunar Module. An important feature was training in geology, so that astronauts on the Moon would know what rocks to look out for. This training in geology included field trips to the Grand Canyon and the Meteor Crater in Arizona, Philmont Scout Ranch in New Mexico, Horse Lava Tube System in Bend, Oregon, and the ash flow in the Marathon Uplift in Texas, and other locations, including Alaska and Hawaii. There was also jungle survival training in Panama, and desert survival training around Reno, Nevada. Water survival training was conducted at Naval Air Station Pensacola using the Dilbert Dunker.

Once their initial training was complete, Duke and Roosa were assigned to oversee the development of the Saturn V launch vehicle, as part of the Booster Branch of the Astronaut Office, headed by Frank Borman and C.C. Williams. He was part of the Mission Control team at the Kennedy Space Center that monitored the launch of Gemini 11 on September 12, 1966, and Gemini 12 on November 11, 1966. His personal responsibility was the Titan II booster. They frequently traveled to Marshall Space Flight Center in Huntsville, Alabama, to confer with its director, Wernher von Braun. NASA provided T-38 Talon aircraft for the astronauts' use, and like most astronauts, Duke flew at every opportunity.

=== Lunar Module specialist ===
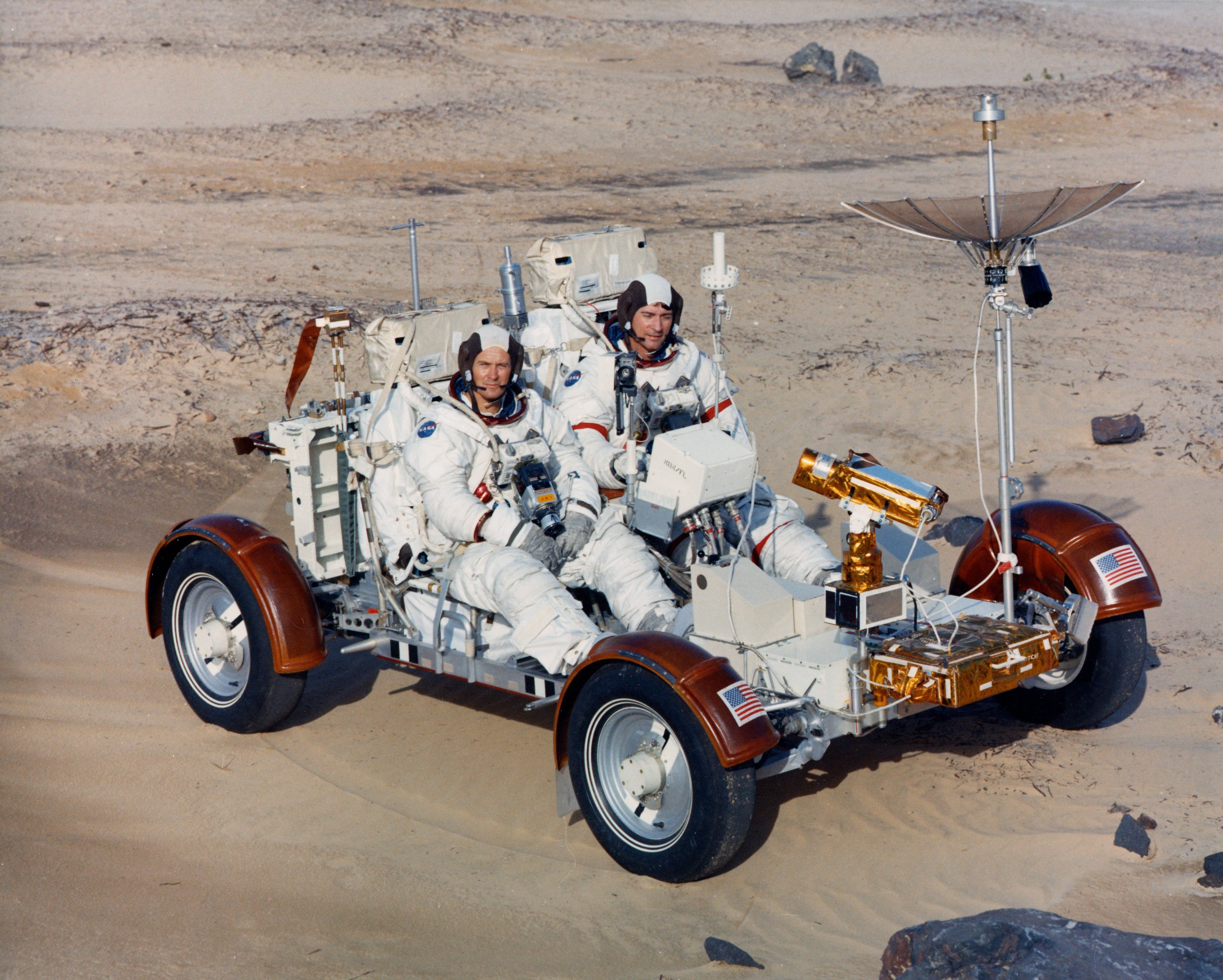
Young (right) and Duke maneuver a training version of the Lunar Roving Vehicle in a field at the Kennedy Space Center built to resemble the lunar surface.

The Nineteen were divided into command and service module (CSM) and Lunar Module (LM) specialists. Slayton asked each of them which specialty he preferred, but made the final decision himself. Once again, Duke received his choice, and became a Lunar Module specialist. He oversaw the development of the Lunar Module propulsion systems. A major concern was the ascent propulsion system, which was a critical component of the mission that had to work for the astronauts to survive. Testing at the White Sands Missile Range in 1966 indicated combustion instability. George Low, the Apollo Spacecraft Program manager, convened a committee to review the situation, and Duke became the Astronaut Office representative on it. Although Bell was confident that it could resolve the problems, NASA hired Rocketdyne to develop an alternative engine just in case. The committee ultimately decided to use Rocketdyne's injector system with Bell's engine.

In 1969, Duke became a member of the support crew for Apollo 10, along with Joe Engle and Jim Irwin. During Projects Mercury and Gemini, each mission had a prime and a backup crew. For Apollo, a third crew of astronauts was added, known as the support crew. The support crew maintained the flight plan, checklists and mission ground rules, and ensured the prime and backup crews were apprised of changes. They developed procedures, especially those for emergency situations, so these were ready for when the prime and backup crews came to train in the simulators, allowing them to concentrate on practicing and mastering them. The mission commander, Tom Stafford, selected Duke for his familiarity with the LM, especially its propulsion systems. For this reason, Duke served as CAPCOM for the LM orbit, activation, checkout, and rendezvous on Apollo 10.

It was unusual for someone to serve as CAPCOM on back-to-back missions, but for the same reason—familiarity with the LM—Neil Armstrong, commander of Apollo 11, asked Duke to reprise his role on that mission, which included the first crewed landing on the Moon. Duke told Armstrong that he would be honored to do so. Duke's distinctive Southern drawl became familiar to audiences around the world, as the voice of a Mission Control made nervous by a long landing that almost expended all of the Lunar Module Eagle's fuel. Duke's first words to the Apollo 11 crew on the surface of the Moon were flustered, "Roger, Twank...Tranquility, we copy you on the ground. You got a bunch of guys about to turn blue. We're breathing again. Thanks a lot!"

=== Apollo 13 ===
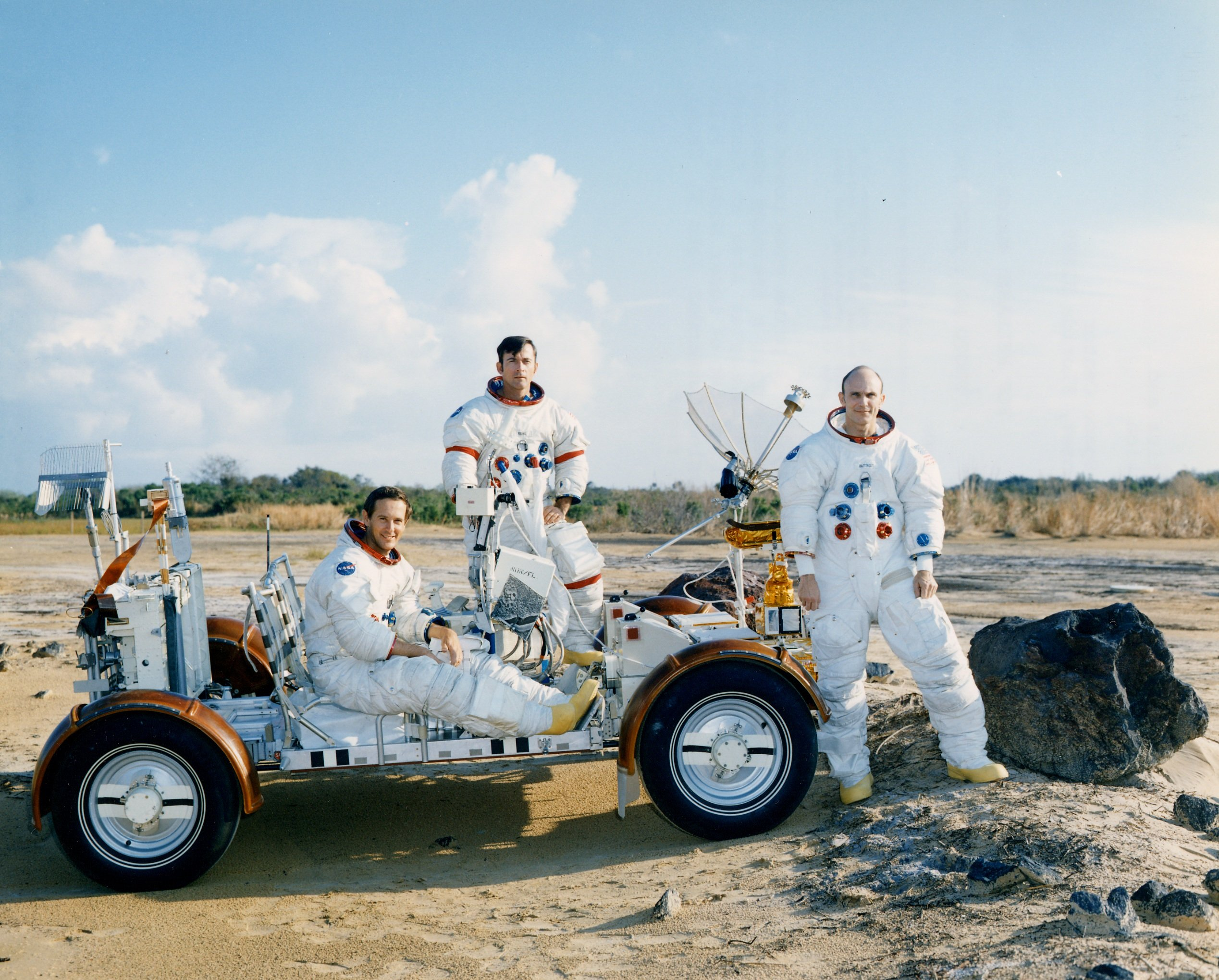
The Apollo 16 crew: Duke (left), John Young (center), and Ken Mattingly (right)

The next rung on the ladder after serving on a support crew was to serve on a backup crew. The pace of the early Apollo missions meant that multiple crews had to be training at the same time. Slayton developed a rotation scheme whereby the backup crew for one mission would become the prime crew for one three missions later, and then the backup for the one three missions after that. If the commander (CDR) declined the offer of another mission, the command module pilot (CMP), as the next most senior astronaut, would become the commander (CDR). Thus, the Apollo 10 crew became the backup crew for Apollo 13. Tom Stafford accepted the position of acting Chief of the Astronaut Office, so the CMP, John Young, stepped up to replace him as CDR; Gene Cernan remained Lunar Module pilot (LMP), and Jack Swigert, a command module specialist from the Nineteen, was designated the CMP. The intention was that this crew would eventually become the prime crew for Apollo 16, but Cernan disagreed with this; he wanted to command his own mission. Slayton therefore assigned Duke, who was well known to Young from Apollo 10, in Cernan's place. After Michael Collins, the CMP of Apollo 11, declined the offer of command of the backup crew of Apollo 14, Slayton gave this command to Cernan.

Full-time training for Apollo 13 commenced in July 1969, although the selection of the Apollo 13 and 14 crews was not officially announced until August 7. The prime crew for Apollo 13 consisted of Jim Lovell (CDR), Fred Haise (LMP) and Ken Mattingly (CMP). The mission was originally scheduled to be flown in late 1969, but in view of the successful outcome of Apollo 11, it was postponed until March and then April 1970. Two or three weeks before the launch date, Duke contracted rubella (German measles) from Paul House, the son of Glenn and Suzanne House. The disease is highly contagious, so the NASA doctors checked the prime crew. It was found that Lovell and Haise were immune to the disease, but Mattingly was not. The decision was taken to remove Mattingly and replace him with Swigert.

The subsequent explosion on Apollo 13 greatly affected the backup crew, especially Mattingly, who felt that he should have been on board. Young, Mattingly and Duke worked in the simulators to develop emergency procedures for the crew, who were ultimately returned safely to Earth. Haise and Swigert teased Duke, calling him "Typhoid Mary". The measles incident resulted in procedures being changed; starting with Apollo 14, the crew would be quarantined for three weeks before the flight as well as afterward. In the event, only the Apollo 14 crew had to endure two periods of quarantine; with no signs of life on the Moon, the post-mission quarantine was discontinued in April 1971.

=== Apollo 16 ===
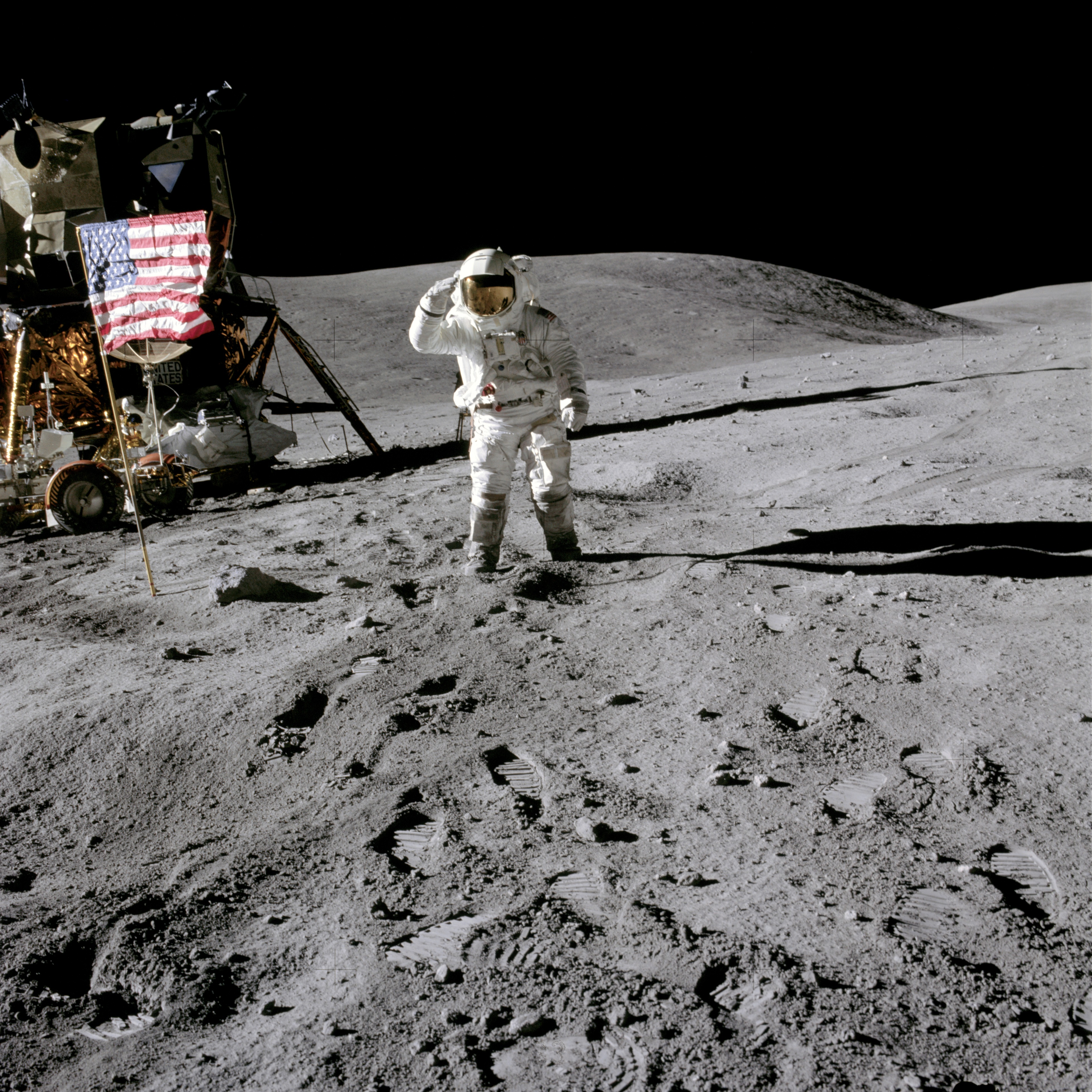
Duke salutes the flag

I'm proud to be an American, I'll tell you. What a program and what a place and what an experience.

— Duke, saluting the U.S. flag on the surface of the Moon, April 21, 1972.

==== Training ====
Young, Mattingly and Duke were officially named as the crew of Apollo 16, the fifth lunar landing mission, on March 3, 1971. The Descartes Highlands were chosen as the landing site on June 3, 1971. This was the highest region on the near side of the Moon. It was believed to be volcanic in origin and mainly composed of basalt, based upon the tones of gray observed from Earth. It was hoped that rock samples retrieved by Apollo 16 would provide clues about the processes that formed the highlands, and perhaps even show that such processes were still active.

Training was conducted in the Lunar Module simulator, which used a TV camera and a scale model of the landing area. Other activities included driving a training version of the Lunar Roving Vehicle (LRV), and collecting geological samples. A final geological field trip was made to the big island of Hawaii in December 1971. On the second day of the trip, Duke caught the flu. By New Year's Day he was so ill that he was unable to get out of bed, and asked the Astronaut Office to send someone to take him to the doctor at the Kennedy Space Center. The doctor took an X-ray that revealed pneumonia in both lungs and called an ambulance to take Duke to the Patrick Air Force Base hospital.

Duke feared that he might not recover in time for the launch, which was scheduled for March 17, 1972. The spacecraft and Saturn V launch vehicle had already been rolled out to Launch Pad 39A on December 13. Luck was with Duke: Grumman engineers wanted more time to test the increased capacity of the LM's batteries; a fault was found with the explosive cords that separate the LM from the CSM that warranted their replacement; and a failure of a clamp in Duke's spacesuit during training required the modification of all three astronauts' suits. This caused the launch date to be postponed to the next launch window, on April 16. This proved fortunate when an error by launch pad technicians caused one of the CM's Teflon fuel tank bladders to rupture, and the entire space vehicle had to be returned to the Vehicle Assembly Building. Slayton noted that "there wasn't even any discussion of replacing him; that was one of the lessons we'd learned on 13."

The astronauts went into quarantine and were allowed out only to fly T-38s for an hour a day. The day before liftoff, the Apollo Program director, Rocco Petrone saw someone he believed to be Duke around the pool at the Holiday Inn. A furious Petrone called the crew quarters demanding to know why Duke had broken quarantine. The staff's protestations that Duke was still there and had not left did not placate Petrone, and they had to track down Duke in training, who suggested that Petrone might have seen his brother Bill. When Apollo 16 was launched at 12:54 Eastern Standard Time (17:54 UTC) on April 16, 1972, Duke became the first twin to fly in space.

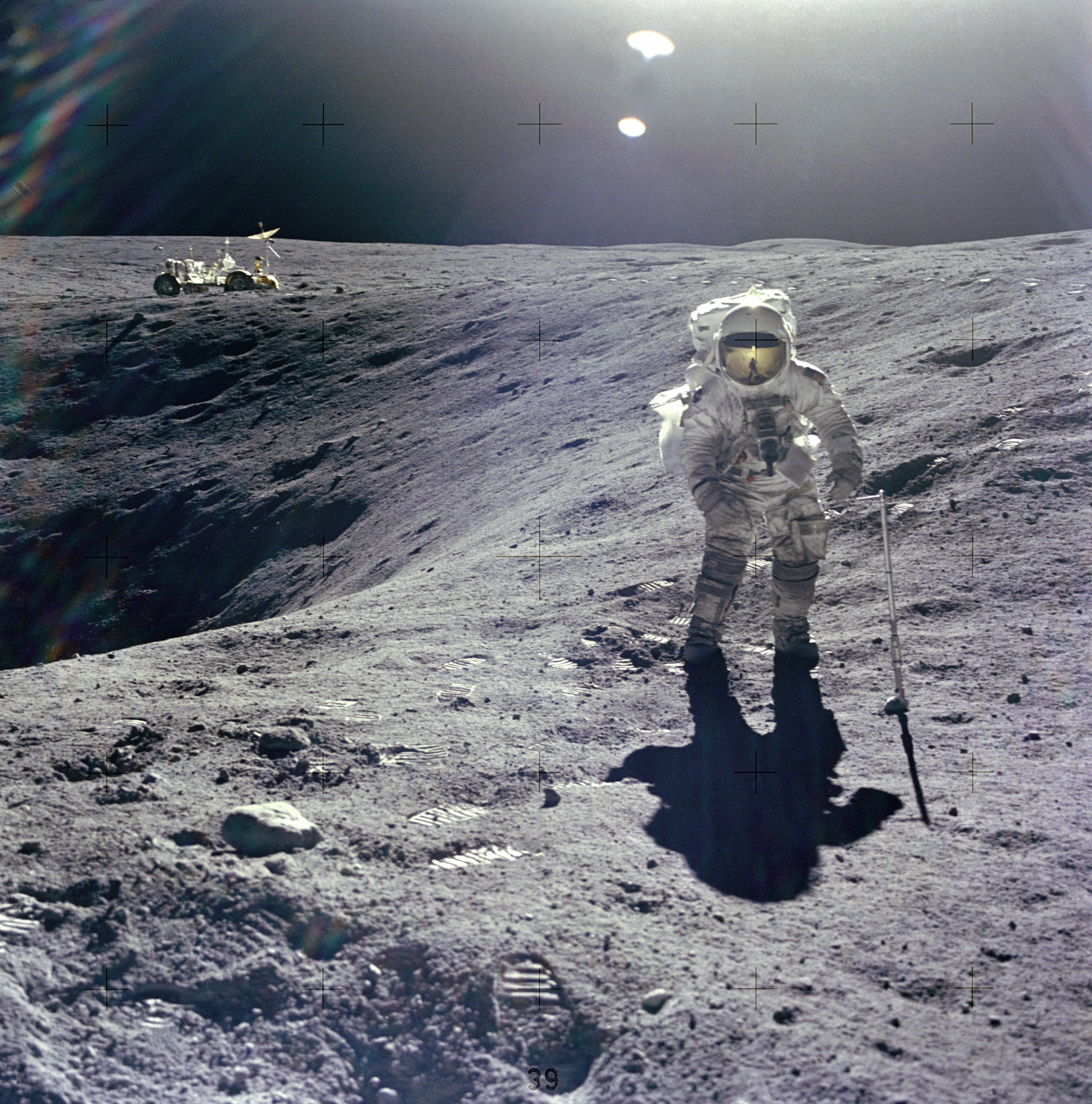
Duke on lunar EVA during Apollo 16, April 1972

==== Outbound voyage ====
The launch was normal; the crew experienced vibration similar to that of previous crews. The first and second stages of the Saturn V performed flawlessly, and the spacecraft entered low Earth orbit just under 12 minutes after liftoff. In Earth orbit, the crew faced minor technical issues, including a potential problem with the environmental control system and the S-IVB third stage's attitude control system, but these were resolved or compensated for. After 1.5 orbits, it reignited for just over five minutes, propelling the craft towards the Moon at 35,000 km/h (22,000 mph).

In lunar orbit, the crew faced a series of problems. Duke was unable to get the S-band steerable antenna on the LM Orion to move in the yaw axis, and therefore could not align it correctly. This resulted in poor communications with the ground stations, and consequently a loss of the computer uplink. This meant that Duke had to copy down 35 five-digit numbers and enter them into the computer. Correcting any mistake was a complicated procedure. Fortunately, the astronauts could still hear Mission Control clearly, although the reverse was not the case.

When Young went to activate the reaction control system, they suffered a double failure on the pressurization system. Young described this as "the worst jam I was ever in". A long debate between the astronauts and with Mission Control followed. It was the only time during the flight that Duke could recall arguing with Young. Although they could not fix the problem, they were able to work around it by shifting propellant into the ascent storage tank. None was lost; it was just moved into another tank.

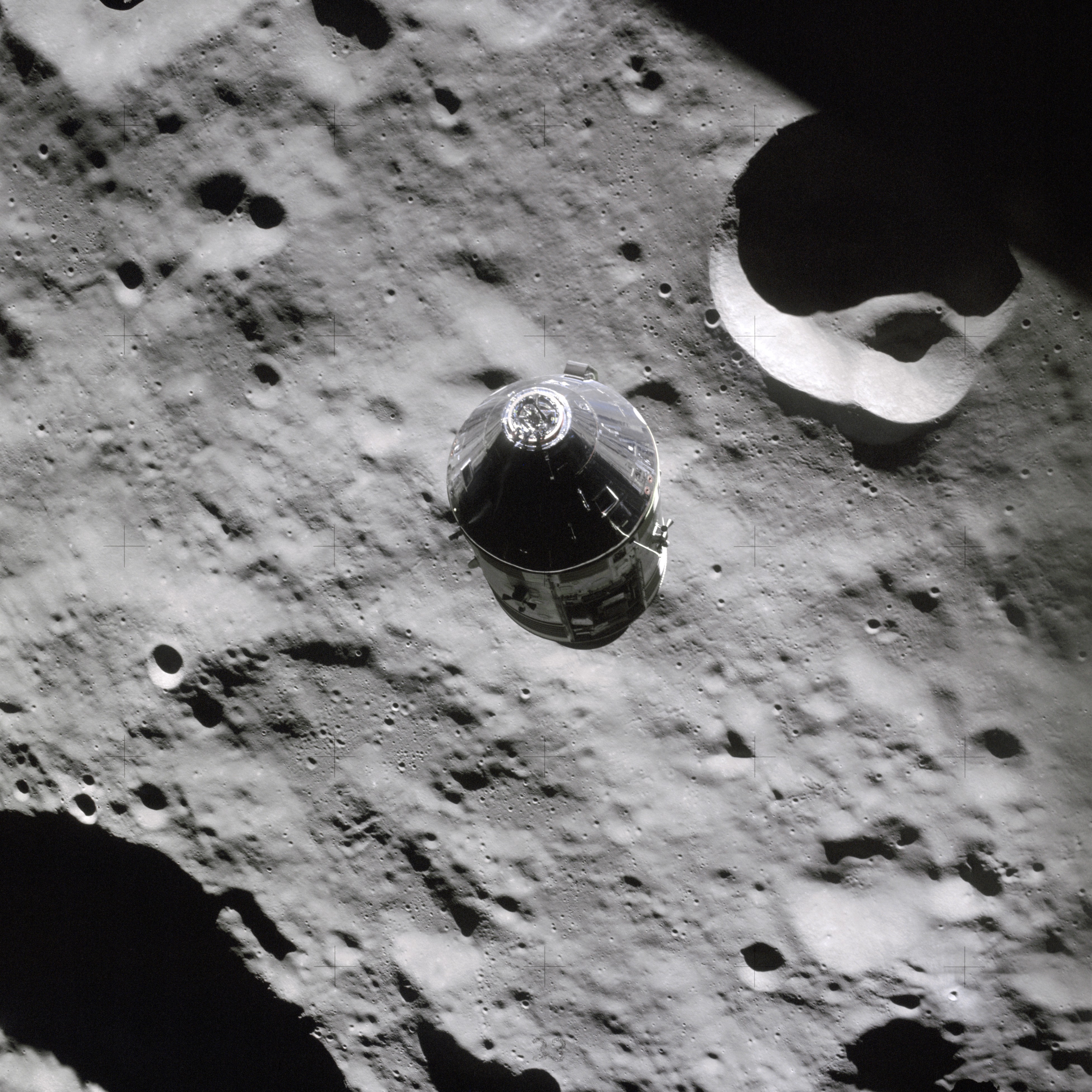
The Apollo 16 Command and Service Module (CSM), as seen from the Lunar Module (LM, out of view) above terrain on the lunar farside

With the preparations finished, Young and Duke undocked Orion from Mattingly in the CSM Casper. Mattingly prepared to shift Casper to a circular orbit while Young and Duke prepared Orion for the descent to the lunar surface. At this point, during tests of the CSM's steerable rocket engine in preparation for the burn to modify the craft's orbit, a malfunction occurred in the engine's backup system, causing such severe oscillations that Casper seemed to be shaking itself to pieces. According to mission rules, Orion should have then re-docked with Casper in case Mission Control decided to abort the landing and use Orion's engines for the return trip to Earth. This was not done, and the two spacecraft flew on in formation. A decision to land had to be made within five orbits (about ten hours), after which the spacecraft would have drifted too far to reach the landing site.

==== Lunar surface ====
After four hours and three orbits, Mission Control determined that the malfunction could be worked around and told Young and Duke to proceed with the landing. As a result of the delay, powered descent to the lunar surface began about six hours behind schedule, and Young and Duke began their descent to the surface at an altitude 5,000 m (16,000 ft) higher than normal. At an altitude of about 4,000 m (13,000 ft), Young was able to view the landing site in its entirety. Orion landed on the Cayley Plains, 270 m (886 ft) northwest of the planned landing site, at 02:23:35 UTC on April 21.

Duke became the tenth person to walk upon the surface of the Moon, following Young, who became the ninth. Apollo 16 was the first scientific expedition to inspect, survey, and sample materials and surface features in the rugged lunar highlands. In a stay of 71 hours and 14 minutes, Duke and Young conducted three excursions onto the lunar surface, during which Duke logged 20 hours and 15 minutes in extravehicular activities. These included the emplacement and activation of scientific equipment and experiments, the collection of nearly 97 kilograms (213 lb) of rock and soil samples, and the evaluation and use of the LRV over the roughest surface yet encountered on the Moon.

During their final few minutes on the surface, Duke attempted to set a lunar high jump record. He jumped about 2 feet 8 inches (0.81 m), but overbalanced, and fell over backwards on his primary life support system (PLSS). It could have been a fatal accident; had his suit ruptured or PLSS broken, he might have died. "That ain't very smart", Young noted.

==== Return to Earth ====
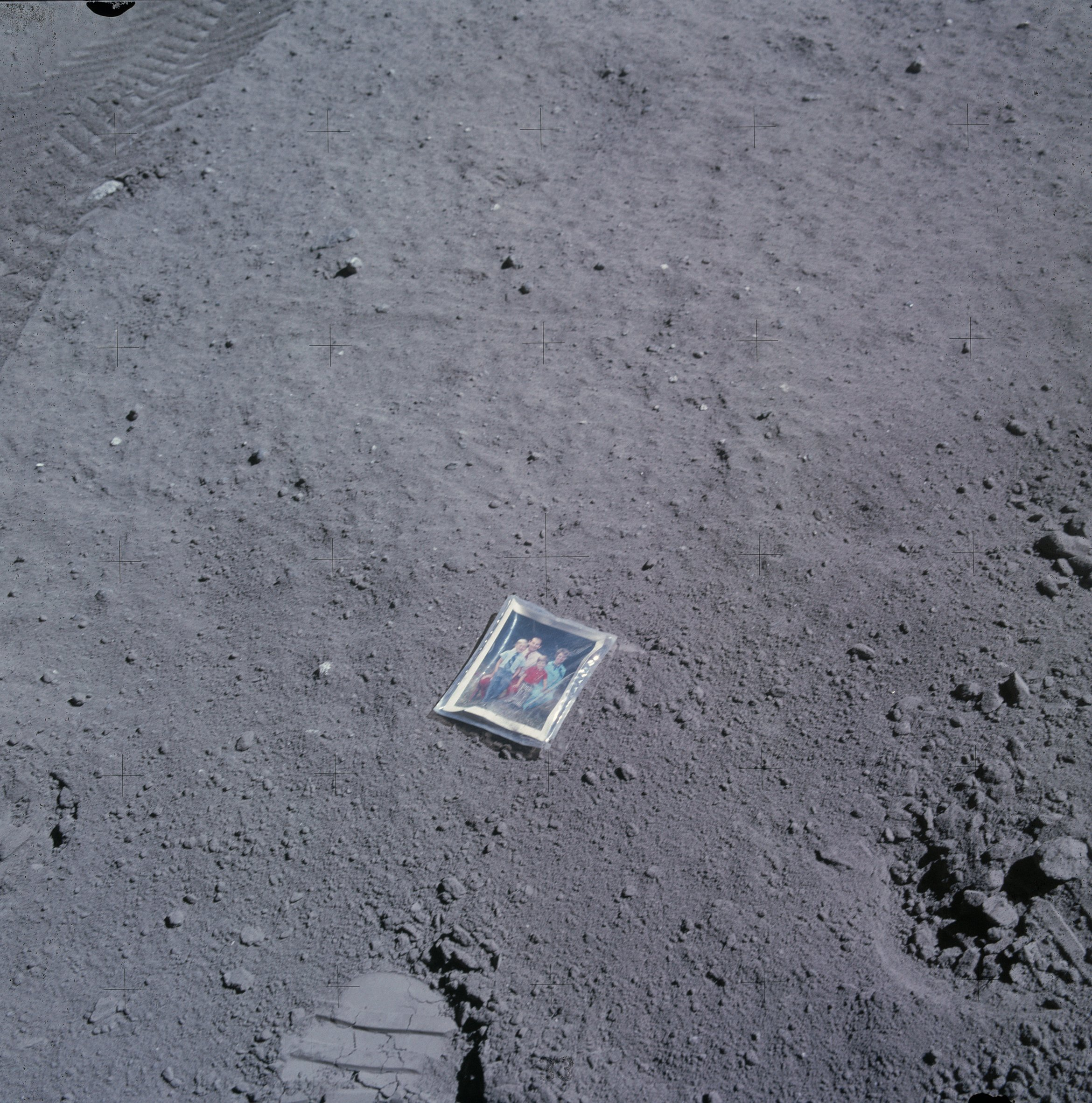
Family picture Duke left on the Moon

On the way back to Earth, Duke assisted in a deep-space EVA that lasted 1 hour and 23 minutes, when Mattingly climbed out of the Casper spacecraft and retrieved film cassettes from the service module. After a journey during which Casper had traveled 2,238,598 kilometers (1,208,746 nmi), the Apollo 16 mission concluded with a splashdown in the Pacific Ocean at 19:45:05 UTC on April 27, and recovery by the aircraft carrier USS Ticonderoga.

Duke left two items on the Moon, both of which he photographed. The most famous is a plastic-encased photo portrait of his family taken by NASA photographer Ludy Benjamin. The reverse of the photo was signed and thumb printed by Duke's family and bore this message: "This is the family of Astronaut Duke from Planet Earth, who landed on the Moon on the twentieth of April 1972."

The other item was a commemorative medal issued by the Air Force, which was celebrating its 25th anniversary in 1972. Duke was the only Air Force officer to visit the Moon that year. With the approval of the Chief of Staff of the United States Air Force, General John D. Ryan, and the Secretary of the Air Force, Robert Seamans, Duke took two silver medallions commemorating the anniversary. He left one on the Moon and donated the other to the Air Force. Today it is on display at the National Museum of the United States Air Force at Wright-Patterson Air Force Base in Dayton, Ohio, along with a Moon rock from the Apollo 16 mission.

In the wake of the Apollo 15 postal covers scandal, Slayton replaced the Apollo 15 crew as the backup for the Apollo 17 mission with the Apollo 16 one. Duke became the backup LMP, Young the backup commander, and Roosa the backup CMP. They went into training again in June 1972, just two months after Duke and Young had returned from the Moon. There was only a slim chance that they would be called upon to fly the mission, and in the event were not. Duke never flew in space again. He retired from NASA on January 1, 1976. He had spent 265 hours and 51 minutes in space.

== Later life ==
Following his retirement from NASA, Duke left active duty in the USAF as a colonel, and entered the Air Force Reserve. He served as Mobilization Augmentee to the Commander, Air Force Basic Military Training Center and to the Commander, USAF Recruiting Service. He graduated from the Industrial College of the Armed Forces in 1978 and was promoted to brigadier general the following year. He retired in June 1986. He has logged 4,147 hours of flying time, of which 3,632 hours was in jet aircraft.

Duke had always been fond of Coors Beer, which was available in Texas only around Dallas and El Paso at the time. In 1975, he heard that the company was thinking of expanding into the rest of Texas. He formed a partnership with former Olympic basketball player Dick Boushka, and they drew up a business plan and put in a bid for the new Coors distributorship in Austin. Coors declined their bid, but offered the distributorship in San Antonio instead, which they accepted. The house in El Lago was sold, and Duke and his family moved to New Braunfels, a community not far from San Antonio, where, as of March 2024, he and wife Dotty remain. His brother Bill died in 2010.

The Coors distributorship was very successful, but Duke became bored and frustrated with it, and decided to sell in February 1978. He and Boushka realized a handsome profit from what had become a thriving business. He joined a friend, Ken Campbell, in real estate ventures. His subsequent business ventures include being president of the Orbit Corporation from 1976 to 1978; director of the Robbins Company from 1986 to 1989 and Amherst Fiber Optics in 2000; chairman of Duke Resources from 1988 to 1993 and Texcor from 1989 to 1994, and of the Astronaut Scholarship Foundation from 2011 to 2012. He was also a consultant for Lockheed Martin.

In 1978, Duke became a committed born-again Christian. Duke wrote in his autobiography that his temper, ego, single-minded devotion to work, and greed had ruined his relationship with his wife and his children, and that his marriage teetered on the verge of divorce in the late 1960s and early 1970s, with Dotty suffering from depression and having considered suicide at one point. Duke stated that his marriage and his relationship with his children improved considerably after he committed his life to Jesus, and both Duke and Dotty—who became a born-again Christian before him—credit God with making their lives much more complete and joyful, with Duke being active in Christian ministry. The Dukes are members of Christ Our King Anglican Church, an Anglican Church in North America congregation in New Braunfels. Duke also is an active young Earth creationist.

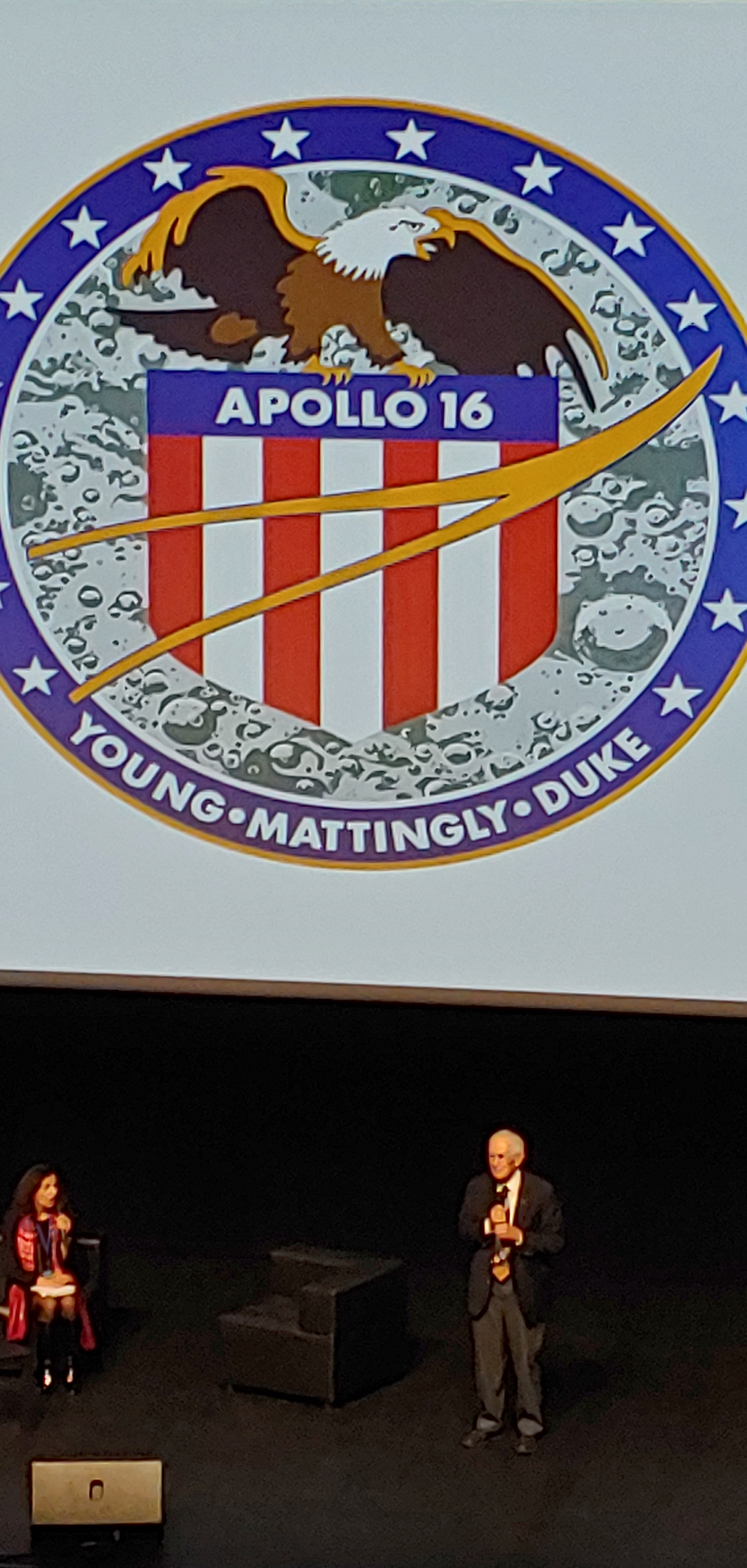
Charles Duke on stage during the first occurrence of festival Explor'Espace in Montrouge, France, on 6 November 2021.

== Awards and honors ==
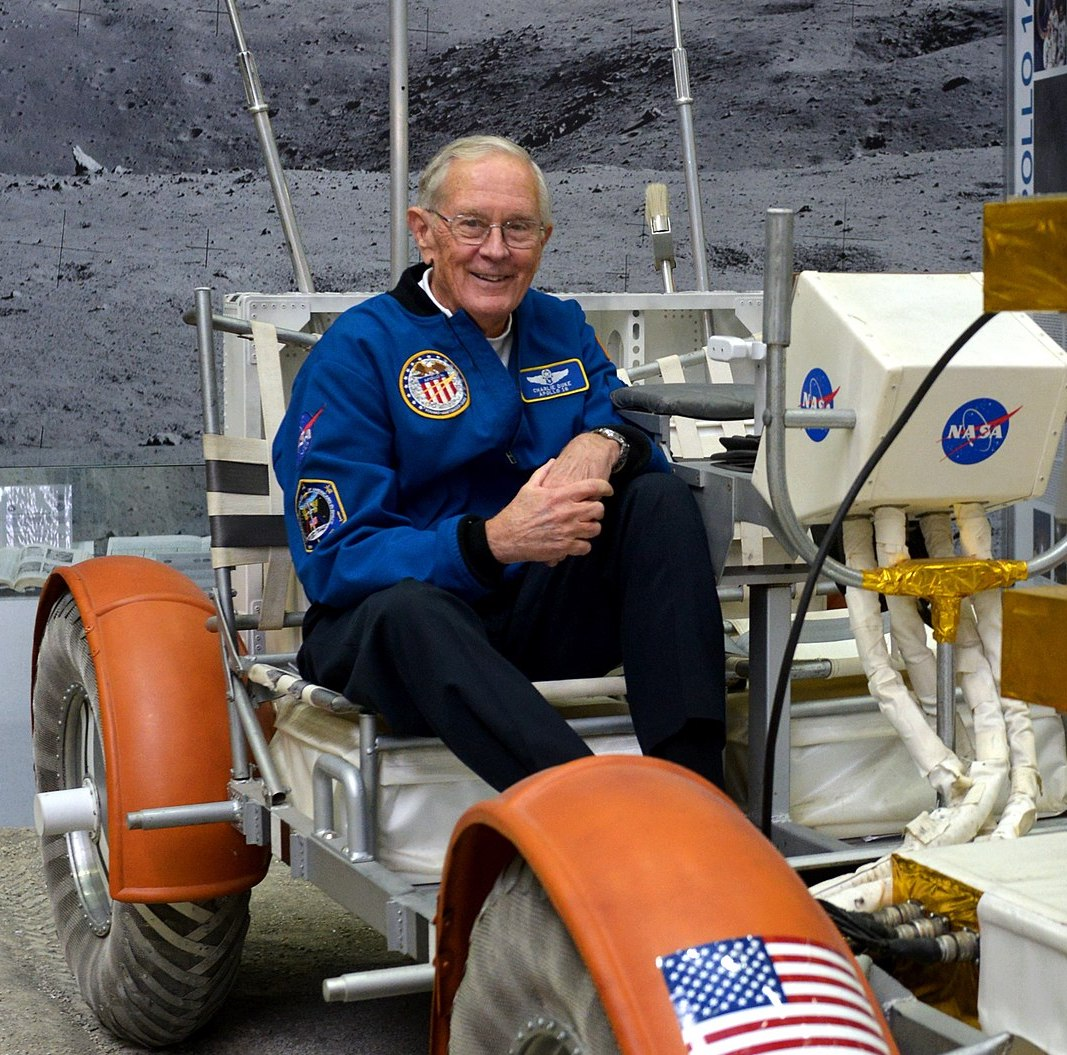
Duke in 2017

In 1973, Duke received an Honorary Doctorate of Philosophy from the University of South Carolina, an Honorary Doctorate of Humanities from Francis Marion University in 1990, and an Honorary Doctorate in Philosophy from Clemson University in 2012. Other honors include the NASA Distinguished Service Medal in 1972, Manned Spacecraft Center Certificate of Commendation in 1970, the Air Force Distinguished Service Medal with Oak leaf cluster, the Legion of Merit, Society of Experimental Test Pilots' Iven C. Kincheloe Award in 1972, American Astronautical Society Flight Achievement Award for 1972, American Institute of Aeronautics and Astronautics' Haley Astronautics Award for 1973, Fédération Aéronautique Internationale V. M. Komarov Diploma in 1973, and the Boy Scouts of America Distinguished Eagle Scout Award in 1975. International Olympic Committee President Thomas Bach presented the Sky is the Limit Trophy to Duke in 2018.

Duke was named South Carolina Man of the Year in 1973, inducted into the South Carolina Hall of Fame in 1973, and the International Space Hall of Fame in 1983. He was one of 24 Apollo astronauts who were inducted into the U.S. Astronaut Hall of Fame in 1997. He was inducted into the Texas Science Hall of Fame in 2000, and the National Aviation Hall of Fame in 2019. His name is inscribed on The Astronaut Monument in Iceland, where they conducted some of their geological training. In December 2019, he was named Texan of the Year for 2020. Asteroid 26382 Charlieduke was named in his honor. The official naming citation was published by the Minor Planet Center on May 18, 2019.

== Cultural depictions ==
Duke was the subject of the documentary Lunar Tribute, which premiered at the American Museum of Natural History's Hayden Planetarium on October 20, 2017. At a panel after the screening, Neil deGrasse Tyson noted that Duke was the youngest person to walk on the Moon. Duke responded that at age 82, he still was. He joined the Back to Space organization in 2018 as an Astronaut Consultant with the goal of inspiring through film the next generation to go to Mars. He was featured prominently in the BBC World Service Podcast, 13 Minutes to the Moon, released in 2019 to mark 50 years since the Apollo 11 mission.

In 2018, country music duo The Stryker Brothers released the song "Charlie Duke Took Country Music To The Moon", which tells the true story of how Duke brought two audio cassette tapes of country music to play during the Apollo 16 mission. Duke's friend Bill Bailey, a disc jockey at Houston-area country music radio station KIKK, had enlisted several country stars of the time to provide personalized recordings for the astronauts. The tapes were introduced by Merle Haggard, and other artists included Porter Wagoner, Dolly Parton, Buck Owens, Jerry Reed, Chet Atkins, and Floyd Cramer.

"The Stryker Brothers" was the stage name for a collaboration between Robert Earl Keen and Randy Rogers, but the two initially kept their identities secret, with promotional material claiming that the music originated from two actual brothers who had died in a prison fire. Duke appeared in an online video asserting that he got to know the brothers as children at the home of disc jockey Bailey, and that he gave them a copy of the tapes following his return from the Moon. In reality, Duke met Rogers at an event in New Braunfels, where both men live.

Duke is a character in episode 34 of the fictional youth audio adventure series Jonathan Park. The script was based on an interview conducted with Duke by the series production team.

In the 1998 miniseries From the Earth to the Moon, Duke was played by J. Downing.

In the 2019 alternate history web television series For All Mankind, Duke is played by Ben Begley.
