= Anders Näsström =

Swedish luger (born 1964)

Personal information
- Nationality: Swedish
- Born: 30 April 1964 (age 61) Stockholm, Sweden

Sport
- Sport: Luge

Anders Näsström (born 30 April 1964) is a Swedish luger. He competed in the men's singles event at the 1988 Winter Olympics. Anneli Näsström, Anders' older sister, also competed in luge and participated in the women's singles event at the 1980 Winter Olympics.
