= Avril Walker =

British luger

Personal information
- Nationality: British
- Born: 8 May 1954 (age 70)

Sport
- Sport: Luge

Avril Walker (born 8 May 1954) is a British luger. She competed in the women's singles event at the 1980 Winter Olympics.
