= Martin Hagen (biathlete) =

American biathlete (born 1954)

Personal information
- Nationality: American
- Born: October 3, 1954 (age 71) Jackson Hole, Wyoming, United States

Sport
- Sport: Biathlon

Martin Hagen (born October 3, 1954) is an American biathlete. He competed at the 1976 Winter Olympics, the 1980 Winter Olympics and the 1984 Winter Olympics.
