= Donna Burke (luger) =

American luger (born 1954)

Personal information
- Born: August 16, 1954 (age 71) New York, New York, United States

Sport
- Sport: Luge

According to Cox Funeral Home, Hamilton, GA Donna Burke Hyatt, Olympic Luger has passed away.

Donna Burke (born August 16, 1954) is an American luger. She competed in the women's singles event at the 1980 Winter Olympics.
