= Peter Hoag =

American test pilot and aerospace engineer

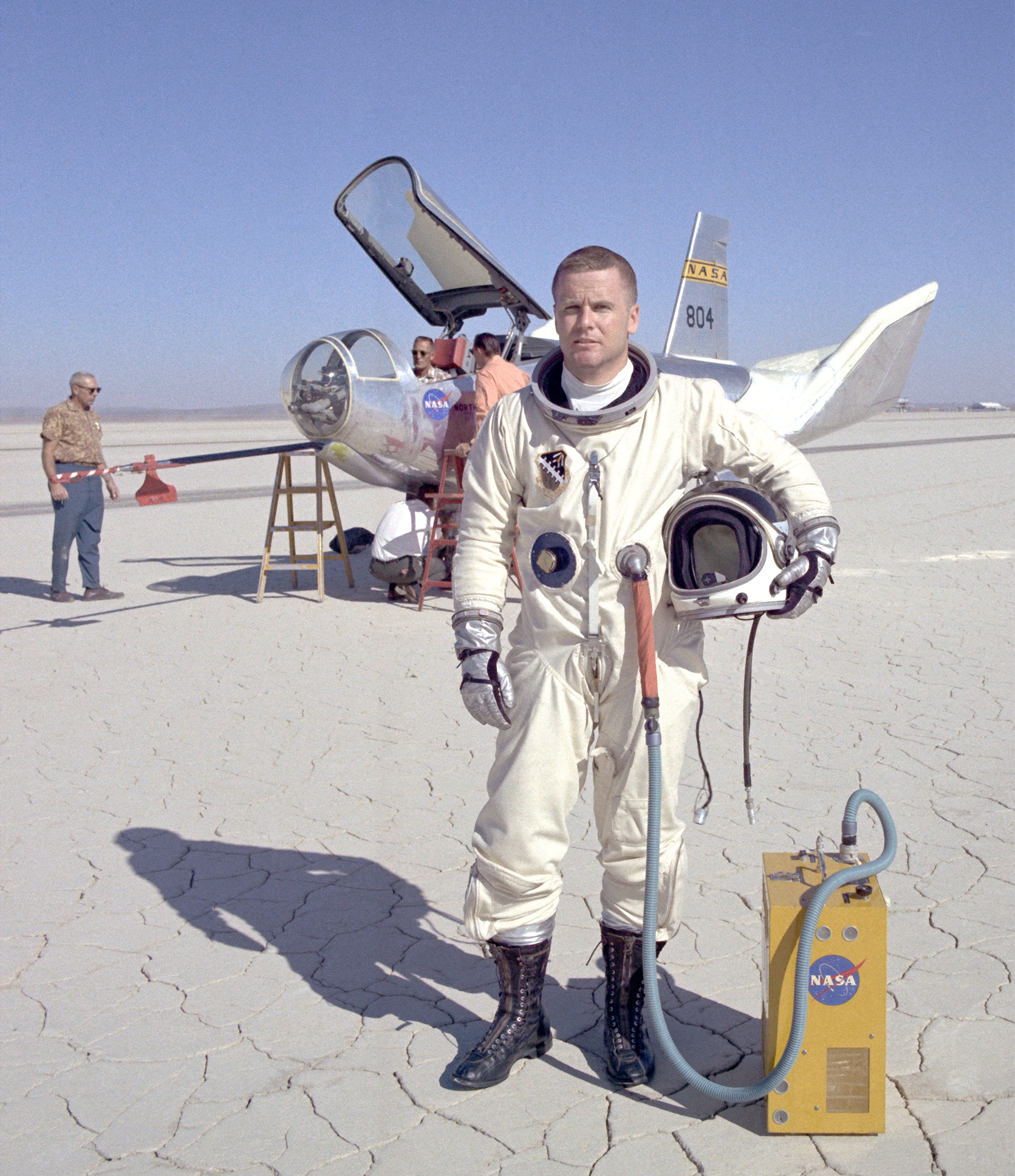
- Portrait in 1969
- Born: April 22, 1937; Chicago, Illinois, U.S.
- Died: November 23, 2024 (aged 87); Provo, Utah, U.S.
- Education: California Institute of Technology; Washington State University (BS); Stanford University (MS)
- Occupations: Pilot; aerospace engineer
- Spouse(s): Patricia McCrea Waller (m. 1960); Alecia Ann Jones (m. 1994)

Peter Charles Hoag (April 22, 1937 – November 23, 2024) was an American test pilot and aerospace engineer who trained under Chuck Yeager. He holds the record for top speed in a lifting body, reaching Mach 1.861 in a Northrop HL-10 on February 18, 1970.

== Early life ==
Hoag was born in Chicago to Russell and Helene Hoag in 1937. He studied geology at Caltech for a few years before entering the U.S. Air Force as a pilot.

He earned a Bachelor of Science degree in electrical engineering at Washington State University and a Master of Science degree in aeronautics and astronautics from Stanford University.

== Career ==
Hoag served as a pilot in the Air Force for 28 years. As a Major, he also taught test pilots.

In 1964, he applied for the U.S. Air Force Aerospace Research Pilot School (ARPS) and received orders to attend class 64-C, which commenced in August 1964 at Edwards Air Force Base in California. The commandant at the time was Chuck Yeager, and Hoag's twelve-member class included Spence M. Armstrong, Alfred Worden, Stuart Roosa, Henry Hartsfield, and Charles Duke. Hoag finished top of the class in September 1965.

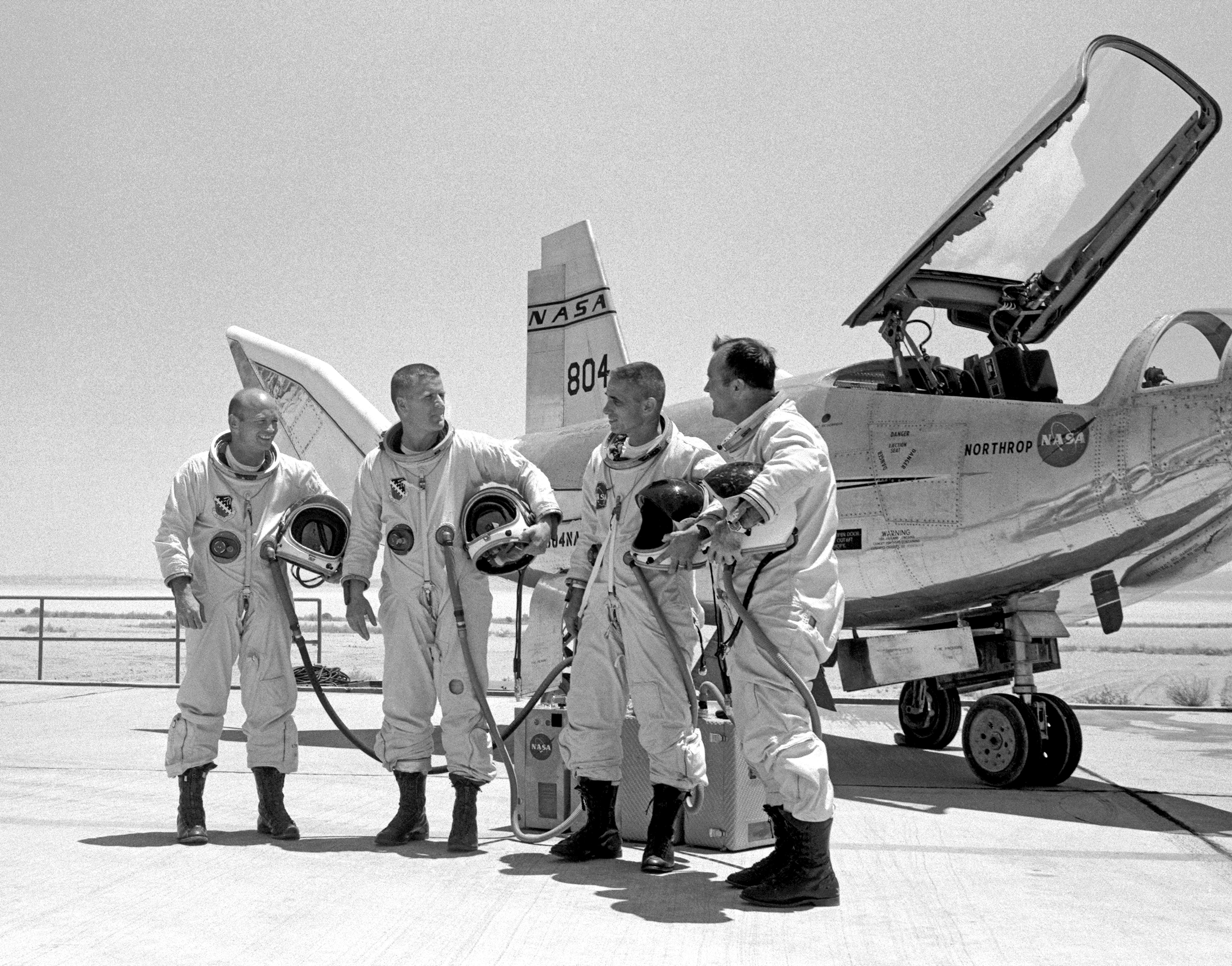
Hoag with HL-10 pilots (1970)

He joined the HL-10 program in 1969 as one of 4 pilots, including John A. Manke, William H. Dana, and Jerauld R. Gentry. The HL-10 was one of five heavyweight lifting-body designs flown at NASA's Flight Research Center (FRC) to develop safe maneuvering and landing of a low lift-over-drag vehicle designed for reentry from space. He completed his first glide flight on June 6, 1969, and made a total of 8 flights in the HL-10.

Hoag holds the record for fastest lifting body flight, which reached Mach 1.861 on February 18, 1970.

He also flew the XB-70 Valkyrie. On June 8, 1966, Hoag was piloting a Northrop T-38 Talon chase plane when the second prototype of the XB-70 collided mid-air with a NASA/Lockheed F-104 Starfighter over Barstow, California. The F-104 pilot Joseph A. Walker and XB-70 co-pilot Carl S. Cross were killed, although the XB-70 pilot Alvin S. White survived after ejecting. The crash occurred when the XB-70's powerful wake vortex flipped the F-104, causing it to strike the XB-70 tail and explode, while the XB-70 entered an uncontrolled spin and crashed.

After retiring from the service, he worked at McDonnell Douglas for a decade.

He died in Provo, Utah in 2024, aged 87.

== Personal life ==
While stationed at Lakenheath in England, Hoag met Patricia McCrea Waller. The couple married in 1960 and had 5 children. After Waller's death, Hoag remarried with Alecia Ann Jones in 1994.

Hoag was Mormon and volunteered at temples in St. Louis, Missouri and Provo.
