= Luge at the 1980 Winter Olympics – Women's singles =

Women's singles at the XIII Olympic Winter Games
- Venue: Mt. Van Hoevenberg Olympic Bobsled Run
- Dates: 13–16 February 1980
- Competitors: 26 from 11 nations
- Winning time: 2:36.537

Medalists
1st place, gold medalist(s)		Vera Zozuļa	Soviet Union
2nd place, silver medalist(s)		Melitta Sollmann	East Germany
3rd place, bronze medalist(s)		Ingrīda Amantova	Soviet Union

The Women's singles luge competition at the 1980 Winter Olympics in Lake Placid was held from 13 to 16 February, at Mt. Van Hoevenberg Olympic Bobsled Run.

== Results ==
Rank	Athlete	Country	Run 1	Run 2	Run 3	Run 4	Total
1st place, gold medalist(s)	Vera Zozuļa	Soviet Union	38.978	39.167	39.271	39.121	2:36.537
2nd place, silver medalist(s)	Melitta Sollmann	East Germany	39.289	39.640	39.360	39.368	2:37.657
3rd place, bronze medalist(s)	Ingrīda Amantova	Soviet Union	39.346	39.488	39.610	39.373	2:37.817
4	Elisabeth Demleitner	West Germany	39.568	39.460	39.466	39.424	2:37.918
5	Ilona Brand	East Germany	39.393	39.506	39.700	39.516	2:38.115
6	Margit Schumann	East Germany	39.611	39.715	39.567	39.362	2:38.255
7	Angelika Schafferer	Austria	39.411	40.249	39.731	39.544	2:38.935
8	Astra Rībena	Soviet Union	39.617	39.780	39.816	39.798	2:39.011
9	Mária Jasenčáková	Czechoslovakia	39.698	39.862	39.906	39.963	2:39.429
10	Christine Brunner	Austria	39.642	40.083	39.833	40.265	2:39.823
11	Angelika Aukenthaler	Italy	39.829	41.043	39.919	39.860	2:40.651
12	Andrea Fendt	West Germany	40.234	40.458	40.215	40.484	2:41.391
13	Agneta Lindskog	Sweden	40.219	40.547	40.463	40.388	2:41.617
14	Annefried Göllner	Austria	40.378	40.375	40.489	40.394	2:41.636
15	Debra Genovese	United States	40.497	40.811	40.799	40.819	2:42.926
16	Monika Auer	Italy	40.590	40.319	41.269	40.855	2:43.033
17	Donna Burke	United States	40.663	40.931	40.943	41.148	2:43.685
18	Carole Keyes	Canada	40.616	40.658	41.567	41.058	2:43.899
19	Anneli Näsström	Sweden	40.987	41.096	40.999	40.877	2:43.959
20	Elena Stan	Romania	40.852	41.489	41.085	41.040	2:44.466
21	Maria Maioru	Romania	41.071	41.054	41.120	41.350	2:44.595
22	Danielle Nadeau	Canada	40.782	40.968	41.770	41.101	2:44.621
23	Joanna Weaver	Great Britain	40.881	41.201	41.167	42.032	2:45.281
-	Maria-Luise Rainer	Italy	39.695	40.948	1:13.062	DNF	-
-	Avril Walker	Great Britain	52.277	42.852	DNF	-	-
-	Susan Charlesworth	United States	41.018	DNF	-	-	-
