= Dick Nalley =

American bobsledder

Personal information
- Nationality: American
- Born: January 24, 1955 Indianapolis, Indiana, United States
- Died: August 28, 2002 (aged 47) Indianapolis, Indiana, United States

Sport
- Sport: Bobsleigh

Dick Nalley (January 24, 1955 – August 28, 2002) was an American bobsledder. He competed in the two man and the four man events at the 1980 Winter Olympics.
