= Donald Nielsen Jr. =

American biathlete (born 1951)

Personal information
- Born: October 18, 1951 (age 73); New London, New Hampshire, United States

Sport
- Sport: Biathlon

Donald Nielsen Jr. (born October 18, 1951) is an American biathlete. He competed at the 1980 Winter Olympics and the 1984 Winter Olympics.
