= Debra Genovese =

American luger

Personal information
- Born: March 9, 1955 (age 70); Rockford, Illinois, United States

Sport
- Sport: Luge

Debra Genovese (born March 9, 1955) is an American luger. In 1978, Genovese was the North American champion. She competed in the women's singles event at the 1980 Winter Olympics.
