= Anneli Näsström =

Swedish luger

Personal information
- Nationality: Swedish
- Born: 29 October 1961 (age 64) Stockholm, Sweden

Sport
- Sport: Luge

Anneli Näsström (born 29 October 1961) is a Swedish luger. She competed in the women's singles event at the 1980 Winter Olympics.

Anders Näsström, Anneli's younger brother, also competed in luge and participated in the men's singles event at the 1988 Winter Olympics.
