= Walter Malmquist =

American ski jumper

Personal information
- Nationality: American
- Born: 3 March 1956 (age 70)

Sport
- Sport: Nordic skiing

Walter Malmquist (born 3 March 1956) is an American former Nordic combined skier and ski jumper who competed in the 1976 Winter Olympics and in the 1980 Winter Olympics where he qualified for the Olympic Team in both ski jumping and Nordic combined. Malmquist posted a 27th place finish in ski jumping on the Large Hill in Lake Placid in the 1980 Winter Games. In the Nordic combined event he stood out with a 2nd place result in the jumping event and posted the 27th fastest time in the cross country event for an overall finish of 12th place. Other top results include an 8th place finish and a 13th place finish in the ski jumping World Cup in Thunder Bay Canada in 1980.
