= Susan Charlesworth =

American luger

Personal information
- Nationality: American
- Born: January 12, 1954 (age 71); Weston, Massachusetts, United States

Sport
- Sport: Luge

Susan Charlesworth (born January 12, 1954) is an American luger. She competed in the women's singles event at the 1980 Winter Olympics.
