= Joe Tyler =

American bobsledder

Personal information
- Born: January 20, 1948 (age 78) Chicago, Illinois, United States

Sport
- Sport: Bobsleigh

Joe Tyler (born January 20, 1948) is an American bobsledder. He competed in the two man and the four man events at the 1980 Winter Olympics. His sister is cartoonist Carol Tyler.
