= Erzgebirge 3 =

State electoral district of Germany

14: Erzgebirge 3
- Electoral district for the Landtag of Saxony
- Erzgebirge 3 in 2024
- District: Erzgebirgskreis
- Electorate: 54,504 (2024)
- Major settlements: Elterlein, Grünhain-Beierfeld, Johanngeorgenstadt, Lauter-Bernsbach, Lößnitz, Schwarzenberg, and Zwönitz

Current electoral district
- Party: AfD
- Member: Thomas Thumm

Erzgebirge 3 is an electoral constituency (German: Wahlkreis) represented in the Landtag of Saxony. It elects one member via first-past-the-post voting. Under the constituency numbering system, it is designated as constituency 14. It is within the district of Erzgebirgskreis.

== Geography ==
The constituency comprises the towns of Elterlein, Grünhain-Beierfeld, Johanngeorgenstadt, Lauter-Bernsbach, Lößnitz, Schwarzenberg, and Zwönitz, and the districts of Breitenbrunn and Raschau-Markersbach within Erzgebirgskreis.

There were 54,504 eligible voters in 2024.

== Members ==
Election	Member	Party	%
2014	Alexander Krauß	CDU	43.1
2019	Thomas Thumm	AfD	37.6
2024	Thomas Thumm	AfD	46.5

== Election results ==
=== 2024 election ===
State election (2024): Erzgebirge 3
Notes:	Blue background denotes the winner of the electorate vote. Pink background denotes a candidate elected from their party list. Yellow background denotes an electorate win by a list member, or other incumbent. A ✓ or ✗ denotes status of any incumbent, win or lose respectively.						
Party	Candidate	Votes	%	±%	Party votes	%	±%
AfD	✓ Thomas Thumm	18,422	46.5	▲12.1	14,604	36.5	▲3.1
CDU	Tom Unger	12,984	32.7	▼0.4	12,602	31.5	▼2.5
BSW					5,191	13.0	
Freie Sachsen					2,027	5.1	
SPD	Simone Lang	2,719	6.9	▼1.8	1,751	4.4	▼2.4
FW	Rico Henkner	2,638	6.7	▲0.9	1,049	2.6	▼1.2
Left	Andrea Schrutek	1,512	3.8	▼6.6	789	2.0	▼7.5
FDP	Martin Kandt	540	1.4	▼2.6	230	0.6	▼3.1
Greens	Dunja Schulze	481	1.2	▼2.5	500	1.2	▼2.1
APT					348	0.9	
Values	Tom Hans Wötzel	354	0.9		267	0.7	
PARTEI					200	0.5	▼0.5
Bündnis C					182	0.5	
BD					103	0.3	
dieBasis					63	0.2	
Pirates					48	0.1	
ÖDP					38	0.1	
V-Partei3					23	0.1	
BüSo					18	0.0	
Informal votes		866			483		
Total valid votes		39,650			40,033		
Turnout		40,516	74.3	▲6.1			
AfD hold	Majority	5,438	13.8				

=== 2019 election ===
State election (2019): Erzegebirge 3
Notes:	Blue background denotes the winner of the electorate vote. Pink background denotes a candidate elected from their party list. Yellow background denotes an electorate win by a list member, or other incumbent. A ✓ or ✗ denotes status of any incumbent, win or lose respectively.						
Party	Candidate	Votes	%	±%	Party votes	%	±%
AfD	Thomas Thumm	12,896	34.4	▲23.2	12,576	33.4	▲22.1
CDU	Falk Haude	12,433	33.1	▼10.0	12,786	33.9	▼9.5
Left	Holger Zimmer	3,903	10.4	▼9.7	3,571	9.5	▼9.8
SPD	Simone Lang	3,250	8.7	▼2.2	2,539	6.7	▼3.1
FW	Jens Zimmermann	2,165	5.8	▲4.0	1,455	3.9	▲2.2
FDP	Heiko Schmuck	1,496	4.0	▲0.9	1,376	3.7	▲0.4
Greens	Ulrike Kahl	1,396	3.7	▼0.1	1,262	3.3	▲0.4
APT					547	1.5	▲0.6
NPD					497	1.3	▼4.7
PARTEI					381	1.0	▲0.7
Verjüngungsforschung					202	0.5	
The Blue Party					127	0.3	
ÖDP					92	0.2	
Pirates					69	0.2	▼0.5
Awakening of German Patriots - Central Germany					61	0.2	
PDV					51	0.1	
Humanists					43	0.1	
DKP					27	0.1	
BüSo					14	0.0	▼0.1
Informal votes		641			504		
Total valid votes		37,539			37,676		
Turnout		38,180	66.0	▲17.2			
AfD gain from CDU	Majority	463	1.3				

=== 2014 election ===
State election (2014): Erzgebirge 3
Notes:	Blue background denotes the winner of the electorate vote. Pink background denotes a candidate elected from their party list. Yellow background denotes an electorate win by a list member, or other incumbent. A ✓ or ✗ denotes status of any incumbent, win or lose respectively.						
Party	Candidate	Votes	%	±%	Party votes	%	±%
CDU	Alexander Krauß	12,686	43.1		12,831	43.4	
Left		5,908	20.1		5,715	19.3	
AfD		3,288	11.2		3,347	11.3	
SPD		3,208	10.9		2,902	9.8	
NPD		1,549	5.3		1,761	6.0	
Greens		1,126	3.8		860	2.9	
FDP		925	3.1		984	3.3	
FW		535	1.8		492	1.7	
APT					269	0.9	
Pirates		220	0.7		208	0.7	
PARTEI					96	0.3	
Pro Germany Citizens' Movement					42	0.1	
DSU					34	0.1	
BüSo					23	0.1	
Informal votes		552			433		
Total valid votes		29,445			29,564		
Turnout		29,997	48.8	▼11.9			
CDU win new seat	Majority	6,694	23.0				

== See also ==
- Politics of Saxony
- Landtag of Saxony
