= Markersbach =

- Village of Raschau-Markersbach
- Interactive map of Markersbach
- Location within Germany Location within Saxony
- Coordinates: 50°31′56″N 12°52′17″E
- Country: Germany
- State: Saxony
- District: Erzgebirgskreis
- Town: Raschau-Markersbach

Area
  - Total: 18.32 km^{2} (7.07 sq mi)
- Elevation: 394 m (1,293 ft)

Population (2006-12-31)
  - Total: 1,894
  - Density: 103.4/km^{2} (267.8/sq mi)
- Time zone: UTC+01:00 (CET)
  - Summer (DST): UTC+02:00 (CEST)
- Postal codes: 08352
- Dialling codes: 03774
- Vehicle registration: ASZ
- Website: www.markersbach.de

Markersbach is a former municipality on the river Große Mittweida in the district of Erzgebirgskreis in Saxony, Germany. Since 1 January 2008, Markersbach and Raschau have formed the municipality of Raschau-Markersbach.

== Constituent communities ==
Markersbach had two of these: Mittweida and Unterscheibe.

== History ==
The forest homestead village (Waldhufendorf) came into being in the early 13th century and was described as Marckquartisdorff in 1240 and as Margerßbach in 1555. It belonged first to the Cistercian monastery at Grünhain, after whose secularization it was governed by the monastery's legal successor, the Amt of Grünhain. The actual village of Markersbach consisted of only three and a half Hufen and a number of cottager plots. It has been governed at least since the 16th century together with the neighbouring, bigger village of Unterscheibe, and indeed in most old documents, the union is simply named as Unterscheibe. For justice's sake, a judge and jurymen were appointed for both villages.

The village stream, parts of which are called Markersbach and other parts of which are called Scheibenbach is a right-bank tributary to the Große Mittweida. Lately, the name Abrahamsbach has become accepted, which stems from the headwaters near the once important Vater Abraham iron ore mine in Oberscheibe.

Two possible meanings of the name Markersbach have been considered. It could have been named after a colonist leader named Markquart, who had the village built. On the other hand, the name could have come from the description Markwart, a border post (“Mark” was a common word for border areas – or marches – in Saxony)

The village acquired its special importance through its church consecrated to Saints Peter and Paul in 1250, through which Markersbach became one of the original parishes in the western Ore Mountains. It was likely run in the earliest centuries of its existence by the Grünhain Monastery. Only in 1265, however, was a vicar mentioned by name (“Paul”). In 1500, the church was mentioned in a pilgrimage bull under its modern name St. Barbara, the patron saint of miners. When the name was changed is unknown. To the parish belonged Markersbach, Unterscheibe, Mittweida and Schwarzbach. In older times Raschau supposedly belonged to Markersbach as a branch church, and likewise, Oberscheibe was assigned to Markersbach’s church, by the favour of the Lords of Schönburg, once the mining town of Scheibenberg had been founded. In 1837, Schwarzbach was separated from the parish after its own church had been built in 1835, and that after a protracted disagreement. Since 2006, the parish has had a “sister church relationship” with the “All Hallows Parish” of Raschau as holder of the communal parish posts, and the “Saint Anne’s Parish” of Grünstädtel.

The first schoolteacher in the village known to history appeared in 1535. The school building that stands today dates from 1862. A further school building was built in 1982, which is now used as a kindergarten. The state primary school was shut down in 2001. Only the Jena Plan school, a state-recognized middle school in free sponsorship, maintains school services in the community.

In the 19th century, with the community council’s and the people’s efforts, the name Markersbach was accepted as a name for the community of Markersbach and Unterscheibe.

In 1889, Markersbach was connected to the railway line from Schwarzenberg to Annaberg, which was closed to passenger transport on 27 September 1997. The station lay in Mittweida’s municipal area and the platform signs read Mittweida-Markersbach. To overcome the great elevation differential, the railway's alignment takes it along a broad bow through the community. Furthermore, three bridges are needed to cross narrow dales.

After negotiations lasting more than twenty years, the neighbouring industrial community of Mittweida was amalgamated with Markersbach on 1 July 1935, bringing the community to the extent that it still enjoys now. Beginning in 1968, the inhabitants of the constituent community of Obermittweida were moved to make room for a hydroelectric power station.

Since 1991, the Middle Franconian market community of Obernzenn has been a partner community.

Since 1990, the chief mayor has been Manfred Meyer (born 1950). At the last election in 2001 he won 97.2% of the vote, and no candidates stood against him.

By municipal council's resolution on 28 February 2007, the community of Markersbach is seeking the restructuring of the administrative community that has hitherto existed into a unified community through the amalgamation of the communities of Markersbach, Raschau and Pöhla by 1 January 2008. Fighting for another plan for amalgamation with Schwarzenberg rather than the plan envisaged by Markersbach is the community of Pöhla, a stand legitimized by plebiscite held there on 26 November 2006. The municipal council's decision needed to remove Pöhla from the administrative community so that this might be done was expected in October 2007.

The creation of the Raschau-Markersbach unified community took place on 1 January 2008.

=== Population development ===
The following population figures refer to 31 December in each given year.

1982 to 1990

- 1982 − 2192
- 1983 − 2256
- 1984 − 2317
- 1985 − 2296
- 1986 − 2302
- 1987 − 2291
- 1988 − 2281
- 1989 − 2232
- 1990 − 2211

1991 to 1999

- 1991 − 2240
- 1992 − 2234
- 1993 − 2216
- 1994 − 2175
- 1995 − 2178
- 1996 − 2155
- 1997 − 2170
- 1998 − 2105
- 1999 − 2108

2000 to 2006

- 2000 − 2063
- 2001 − 2026
- 2002 − 1997
- 2003 − 1954
- 2004 − 1956
- 2005 − 1915
- 2006 − 1894

Source: Statistisches Landesamt des Freistaates Sachsen

== Sightseeing ==
- The St.-Barbara-Kirche (church) is one of the oldest village churches in the Ore Mountains. Particularly worthy of mention are the pulpit built by ironworks master Enoch Pöckel in 1610, the chancel with its small prayer parlour, consecrated in 1719, together with the confessional and the altar, its altogether rich, pictorial embellishment and the Trampeli organ dedicated in 1806.
- The Markersbach Pumped Storage Power Plant with its two man-made upper and lower water basins.
- The 37-m-high Markersbacher Viadukt, known as the Streichholzbrücke or “Matchstick Bridge”, on the Schwarzenberg–Annaberg railway line
- Construction site of the Markersbach bypass (completion date Nov. 2008)

== Sons and daughters of the community ==
- Manfred Günther (1942–2005?), East German racecar driver
- Jürgen Escher (b. 1951), former player and coach for Wismut Aue
