= Schwarzbach (Elterlein) =

- Stadtteil of Elterlein
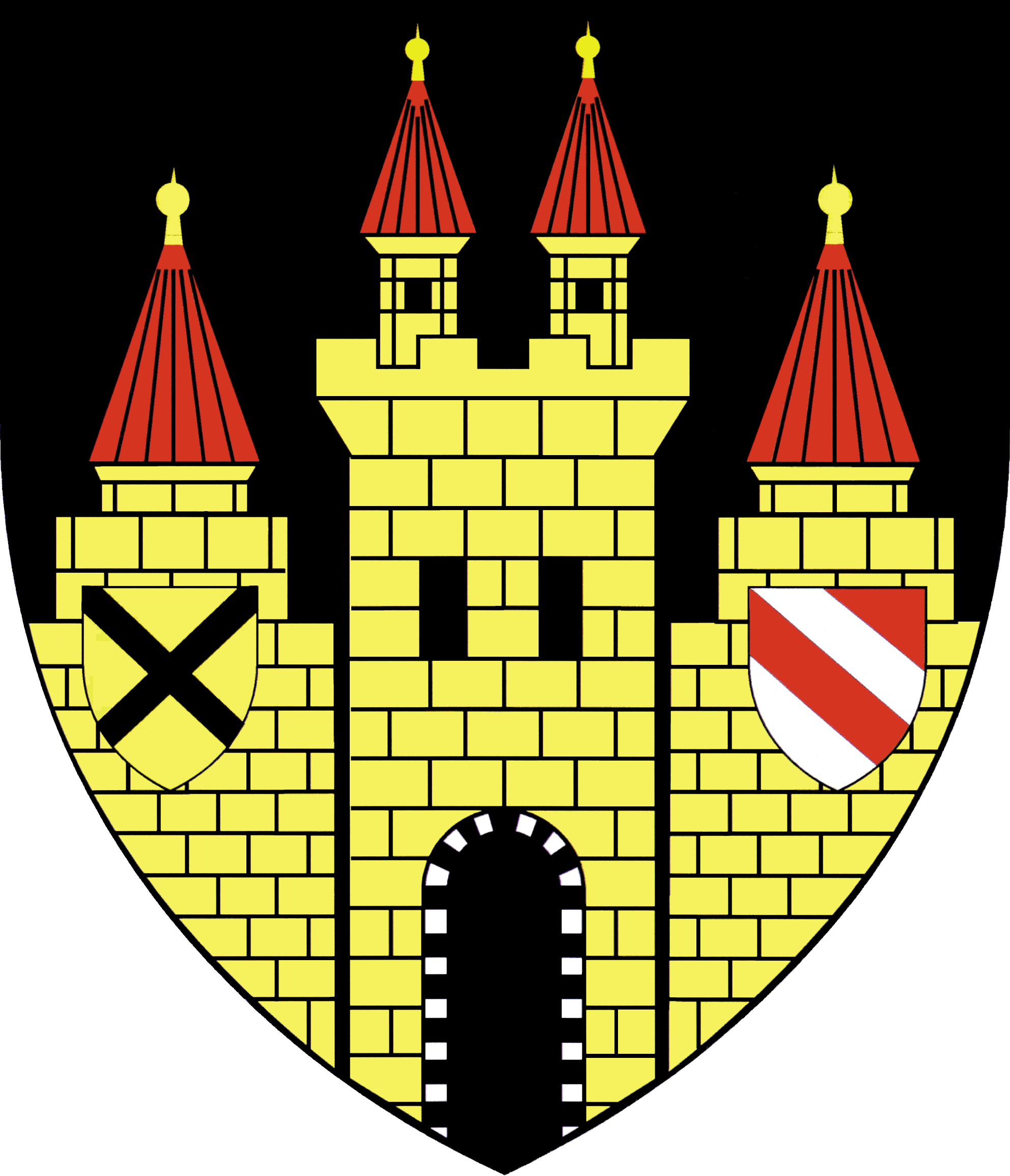
- Coat of arms
- Interactive map of Schwarzbach
- Location within Germany Location within Saxony
- Coordinates: 50°33′43″N 12°51′57″E
- Country: Germany
- State: Saxony
- District: Erzgebirgskreis
- Town: Elterlein
- Elevation: 530 m (1,740 ft)

Population (2013)
  - Total: 554
- Time zone: UTC+01:00 (CET)
  - Summer (DST): UTC+02:00 (CEST)
- Postal codes: 09481
- Dialling codes: 037349
- Vehicle registration: ERZ
- Website: www.elterlein-stadt.de

Schwarzbach (German pronunciation: [ˈʃvaʁtsˌbax]) is a village and a former municipality in the Ore Mountains in Saxony, Germany. Since 1996 it is part of the town Elterlein.

== Etymology ==
The name 'Schwarzbach' means 'Black Stream' in German. First mentioned as "Swartzpach" in a document in 1240, the background of the name is vague. One assumption is that there was a peat-cutting site in the village that dyed the water of the stream black. Others say that in former times the forest reached until the streambank so the water appears black.

== Geography ==
Schwarzbach is situated in a valley of the eponymous stream, that flow through the village from north to south. The town Elterlein borders on Schwarzbach in the north, Hermannsdorf in the northeast, Scheibenberg in the southeast, Markersbach in the south, Langenberg in the southwest, Waschleithe in the west and Grünhain in the northwest.

== History ==
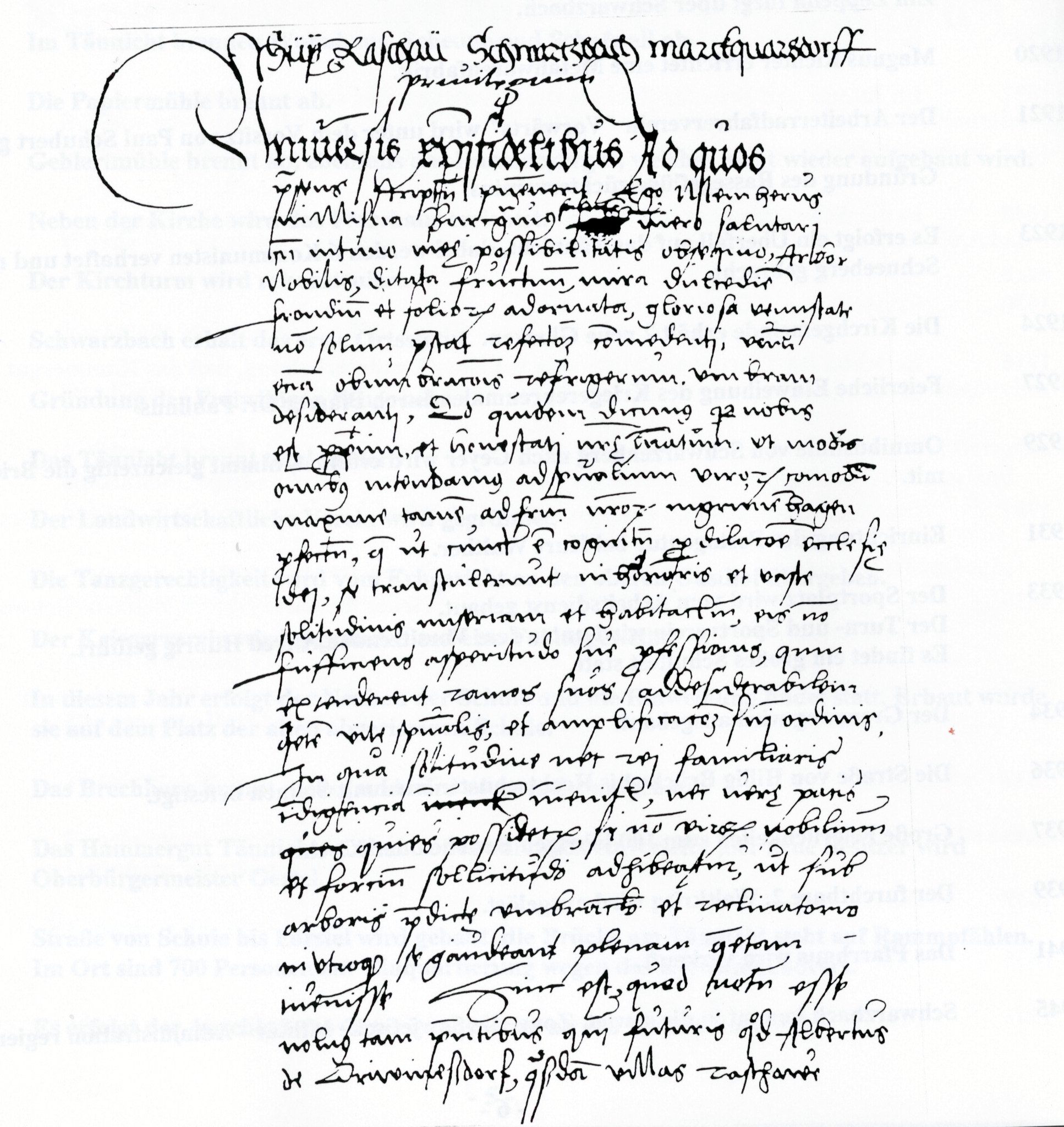
First documentary evidence of Schwarzbach in 1240

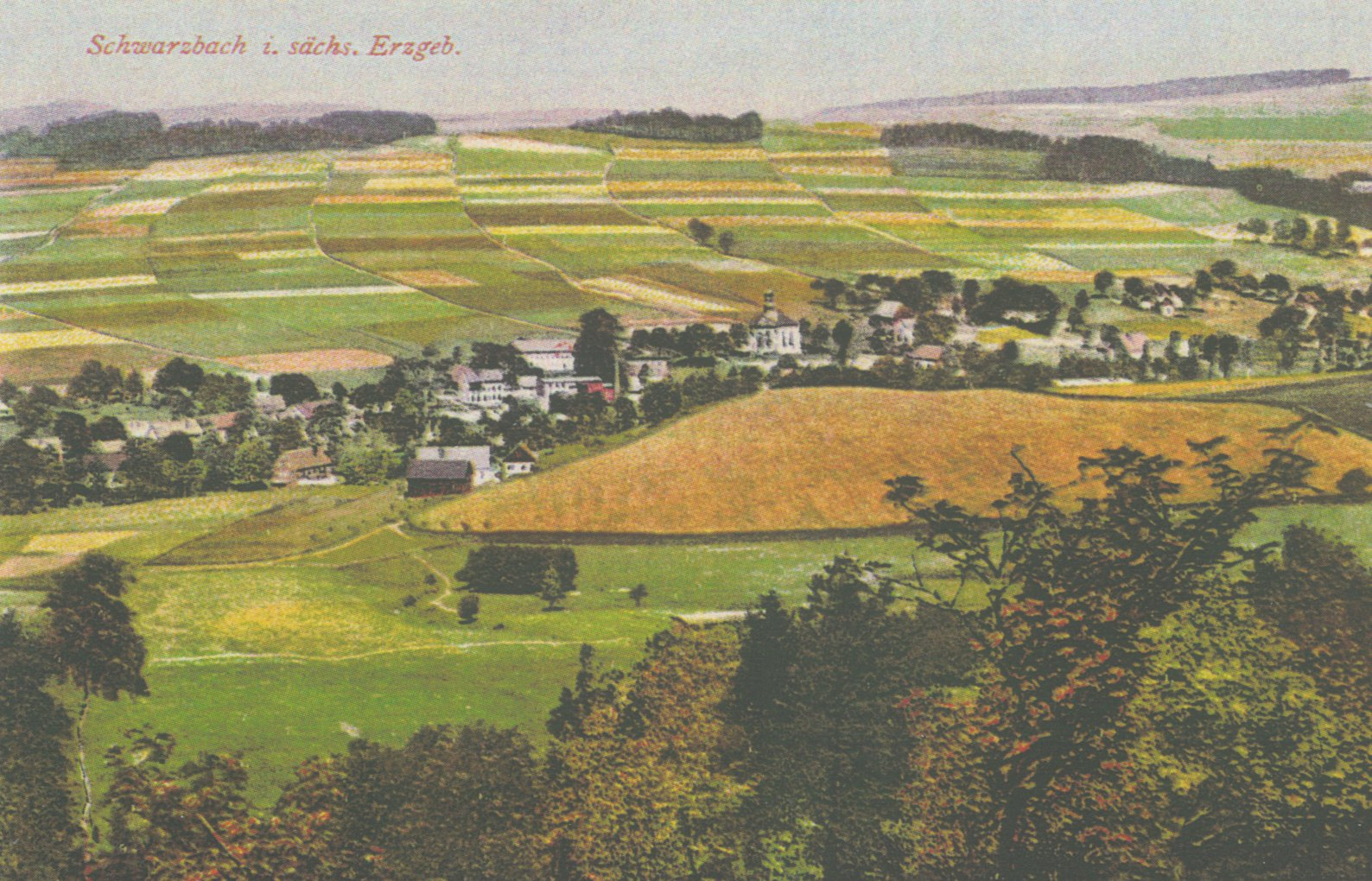
Village of Schwarzbach

In the end of the 12th century, Franconian farmers came in the Schwarzbach valley and settled down. The first documentary evidence of the existence of a village called ‘Swartzpach’ was found in 1240, when Schwarzbach was given to the monastery Grünhain. After a destruction by a fire in 1322, pope John XXII ordered a rebuild of the village. In the 16th century, many inhabitants made their money in the mining branch (Berggeschrey). Mines and hammer mills arose around Schwarzbach. In the 19th century, the main source of income was the flax cultivation and lace-making. In 1837, the inhabitants at last get an own church. The “Dorfkirche Schwarzbach” was built on a little hill in the village and is a classicistic building. From 1952 to 1990, Schwarzbach was part of the Bezirk Karl-Marx-Stadt of East Germany. In 1996, Schwarzbach was incorporated to Elterlein. Today, the village is characterized by old farmhouses and new one family houses.

== Demography ==
1548	45	1834	450	1939	520
1660	143	1871	420	1950	702
1755	198	1890	419	1990	543
1795	383	1910	449	2011	573

== Literature ==
- Waldus Nestler, Elke Kretzschmar: Familienbuch für Schwarzbach/Krs. Annaberg 1540–1836. Leipzig 1993, (lückenhaft; mit einem kurzen historischen Abriss)
- Gisela Gasde: Schwarzbach – ein Waldhufendorf. Schwarzbach 1994.
- Gisela Gasde: Schwarzbach – unser schönes Dorf 1945–89. Schwarzbach 1995.
