= Mittweida (disambiguation) =

Mittweida is a town in Saxony, Germany.

Mittweida may also refer to:

- Mittweida (district), a former district of Saxony, Germany, in 2008 merged into district Mittelsachsen
- Große Mittweida (short also Mittweida), a river of Saxony, Germany
- Mittweida, a constituent community of the former municipality Markersbach, today part of Raschau-Markersbach, Saxony, Germany
- Mittweida, an older name of the district Mittweide of municipality Tauche, Saxony, Germany
