= Raschau =

- Village of Raschau-Markersbach
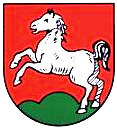
- Coat of arms
- Interactive map of Raschau
- Location within Germany Location within Saxony
- Coordinates: 50°32′N 12°50′E
- Country: Germany
- State: Saxony
- District: Erzgebirgskreis
- Town: Raschau-Markersbach
- Subdivisions: 2

Area
  - Total: 21.20 km^{2} (8.19 sq mi)
- Elevation: 429 m (1,407 ft)

Population (2006-12-31)
  - Total: 3,948
  - Density: 186.2/km^{2} (482.3/sq mi)
- Time zone: UTC+01:00 (CET)
  - Summer (DST): UTC+02:00 (CEST)
- Postal codes: 08352
- Dialling codes: 03774
- Vehicle registration: ERZ
- Website: www.raschau.de

Raschau is a former municipality in the district of Erzgebirgskreis in Saxony, Germany. Since 1 January 2008, Raschau and Markersbach have formed the municipality Raschau-Markersbach.

== Geography ==
=== Location ===
Raschau is 3.5 kilometres east of the town of Schwarzenberg in the valley of the river Mittweida, which is also known as the Raschauer Grund.

The publisher August Schumann (Vollständiges Staats-, Post- und Zeitungs-Lexikon von Sachsen. Zwickau: Schumann, 1822, S. 758ff.) described the community's location in 1822 thus: “It lies, mostly surrounded by the Schwarzenberg Amt area, 2 hours south-southeast of Grünhayn, 3/4 to 1 1/4 hours east-southeast of Schwarzenberg, 1 1/2 to 2 hours west-southwest of Scheibenberg; on the Mittweide, which joins the Pöhl at the community’s lower end; along the new country road from Schwarzenberg to Annaberg; in a pleasant valley bordered on the north by the steep Raschauer Knochen, on the southeast by the gentler Ziegenberg (at which 100 years ago the mine founder Christian was active), to the southwest, however, owing to its meeting the Pöhl Valley, becomes a broad, charming and fruitful floodplain; the community’s elevation runs from 1450 to almost 1550 Parisian feet if one is looking from the lone houses; its length stretches to 5/8 of an hour, and its direction goes from west to east.”

=== Geology and mining ===
Early in the 16th century, iron ore was found by the monks from the Grünhain Monastery at the Emmlerfelsen, which triggered the establishment of mining, foundries and ironworks in and around Raschau. By the end of the 17th century, other stone worthy of mining was found at the Raschauer Knochen (551 m), mainly tin ore, iron ore and gravel, and also small amounts of silver, whereupon new lodes began to be mined, although their yields were mostly only small. Only two of Raschau's pits brought rich deposits to light. The Allerheiligen-Fundgrube (“All Hallows Lode”) worked, besides silver, bismuth and cobalt ores, also gravel, which served as the basis for sulphur and vitriolic acid making. The Seegen Gottes (“God’s Blessing”) Lode brought up silver and tin ores.

=== Neighbouring communities ===
Bordering communities are, in the north, Langenberg (although this has been amalgamated with Raschau since 1924), in the east Markersbach, in the south Pöhla and in the southwest Schwarzenberg's constituent community of Grünstädtel.

== History ==
=== Historic overview ===
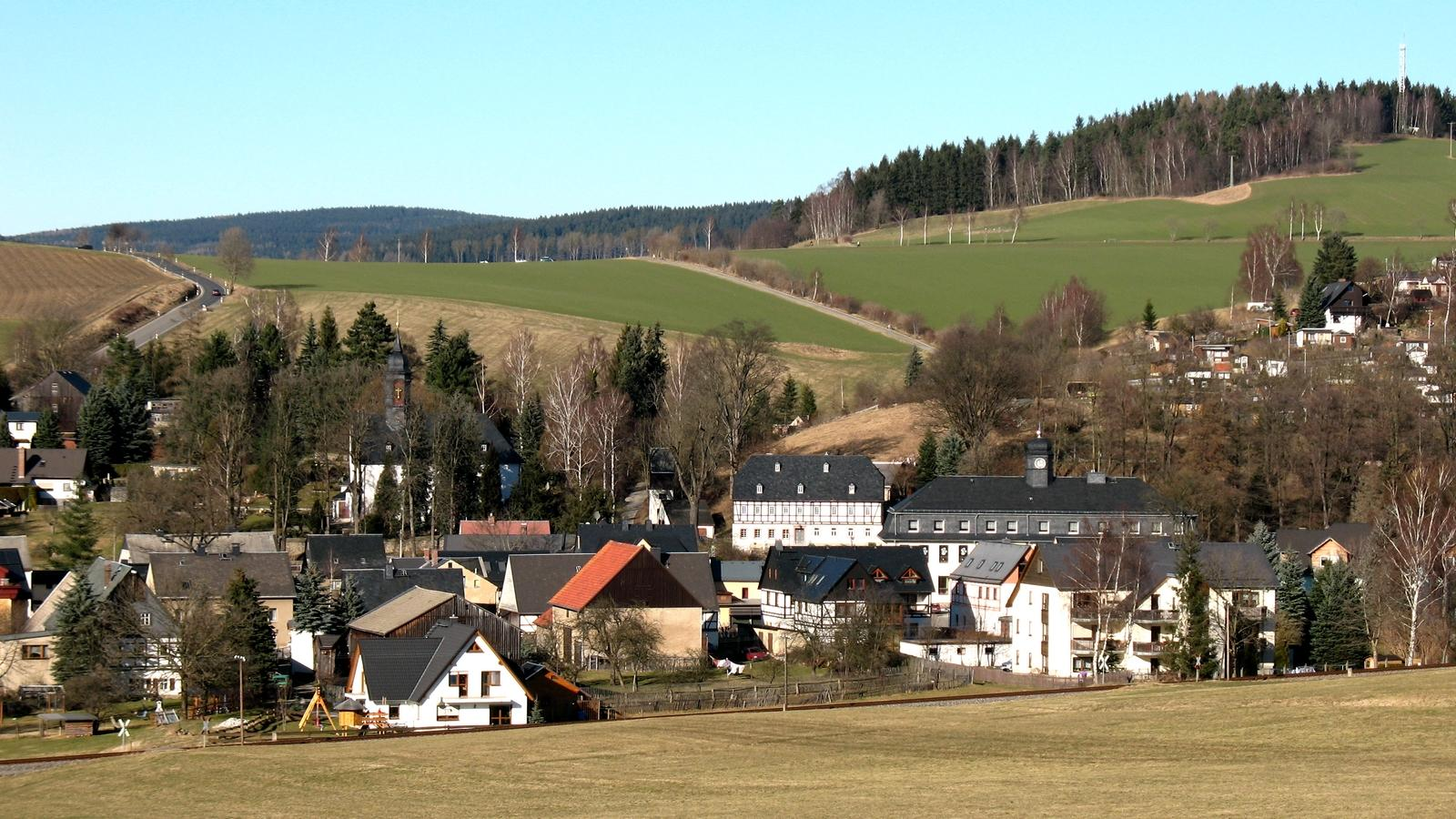
Central Raschau

In 1240, Raschau had its first documentary mention when it was donated along with nine surrounding villages to the Grünhain Monastery. Raschau was settled, presumably by Main Frankish farmers somewhat earlier, perhaps in the second half of the 12th century. It was laid out as a typical forest homestead village (Waldhufendorf). The first mill must have appeared a short time later, for as early as 1240, today's Süß-Mühle is mentioned in a document. An ironworks in Raschau is mentioned for the first time in 1401. In the time of the Reformation came the first sources giving a glimpse of the villagers, and so in 1531, history records, besides 30 landowners, nine crofters and cottagers whose family names are still to be found in the village, among them Teubner, Neubert and Ficker.

The 17th century in Raschau was shaped by two catastrophes, the Thirty Years' War and the plague, which last beset the village in 1680.

In the time following this, Raschau developed itself quite well; besides the flourishing mining industry at the lodes around the community, there was also lace tatting and the population swelled considerably. In the first half of the 19th century it had reached 2,000. The second half of the same century was characterized by industrialization. The first cork factory in the village, founded in 1859 by Wilhelm Merkel, was a product of this era. The Schwarzenberg-to-Annaberg railway line, dedicated in 1889, stopped at the community, and ever more, Raschauers earned their living working in the factories. The village's 20th century history went much as it did in other villages in Saxony. The past several years have been characterized by emigration and joblessness.

=== The Thirty Years' War ===
The Thirty Years' War did not stop even at Raschau and its inhabitants. The village was especially badly stricken in the summer of 1632 when the later field marshal Heinrich von Holk invaded Saxony. On 20 August he reached Raschau with his troops and burnt down Enoch Pöckel's heirs’ ironworks estate, which lay in Mittweida's lower end, right on the boundary with Raschau. After the attack on the ironworks, Holk ordered his men to encircle the village. To this end, he ordered 300 horses on the Emmler, and two further groups with over 100 horses at the village's eastern and southern ends, to thwart – and kill – any farmers who tried to flee. Ore Mountain chronicler Christian Lehmann (de) reports fights between Holk's troops and Raschau and Markersbach inhabitants stretching from the ironworks to Unterscheibe over a “small mile”.

The church books from both villages give information about losses among the villages’ own ranks. In Raschau it was the carpenter Heinrich Bach, Martin Ruder and Paul Weichel as well as Thomas Ficker’s farmhand “all of whom one day, by the emperor’s rapacious warriors who invaded on 20 August, were mown down”. On 24 August 1632, all four were buried at Raschau's graveyard. That not all the dead could be buried right away is shown in another entry in the church book. Only on 18 September was the Raschauer Heinrich Händel “(who was also shot by the foe on 20 August and afterwards found dead on 17 September on the supply road near Crotendorff in the bushes by a cowherd)” buried.

Also as the war wore on, enemy soldiers kept cropping up in Raschau, and so on 5 August 1633 Caspar Merkel “who was shot down by the emperor’s rapacious soldiers in his herb garden” was buried. In 1640, Peter Weigel's wife Barbara and their daughter Margaretha died while fleeing into the woods from the invading Swedes as most of the villagers did. One froze on her flight, and the other was lost and her remains – “a few bones and clothing remnants” – were found only months later and buried. From these and other examples, the unbearable circumstances of this time are clear. Only in the late 17th century did Raschauers get back on their feet economically, recovering slowly from the war's aftermath.

=== The Plague ===
After Holk's troops raided the village in 1632 there came the next year a further, much worse threat to the villagers. The year's first Plague death was Jacob Junghans. It was not, as commonly claimed, the retreating troops’ doing, but rather Jacob Junghans himself had brought the Black Death to town. He came back from a trip to Freiberg in March of that year and then died within three days. What followed was by far the village's worst ever epidemic. All together, by December, 33 people had died of the Plague; among them, whole families were wiped out. To thwart the epidemic's further spread, the dead were no longer buried at the graveyard, but rather in the woods.

The second wave of the Plague that beset Raschau in the 17th century reached the village in the autumn of 1640. It seems to have been brought by soldiers who stayed during the pullout in and around Raschau. This time 15 Raschauers died. Hans Weigel's family was the worst hit. After five of his children died within a fortnight, both he and his wife were then buried in early October.

There was one last outbreak of the Plague in the village in 1680. Within two months, 32 Raschauers died of it. Some of the dead were buried at the graveyard, others in the woods or on the meadow. To avoid being infected, neither the minister nor the gravedigger was willing to take on the job of burying the dead, often leaving the victims’ families to deal with the arrangements themselves. In the worst case, nobody was willing to bury the dead, and thus Euphrosina Neubert, who “died in the parish wood” on 23 September of that year, was “eaten by foxes and dogs”. In mid October, the Plague disappeared from Raschau as quickly as it had appeared.

=== Religion ===
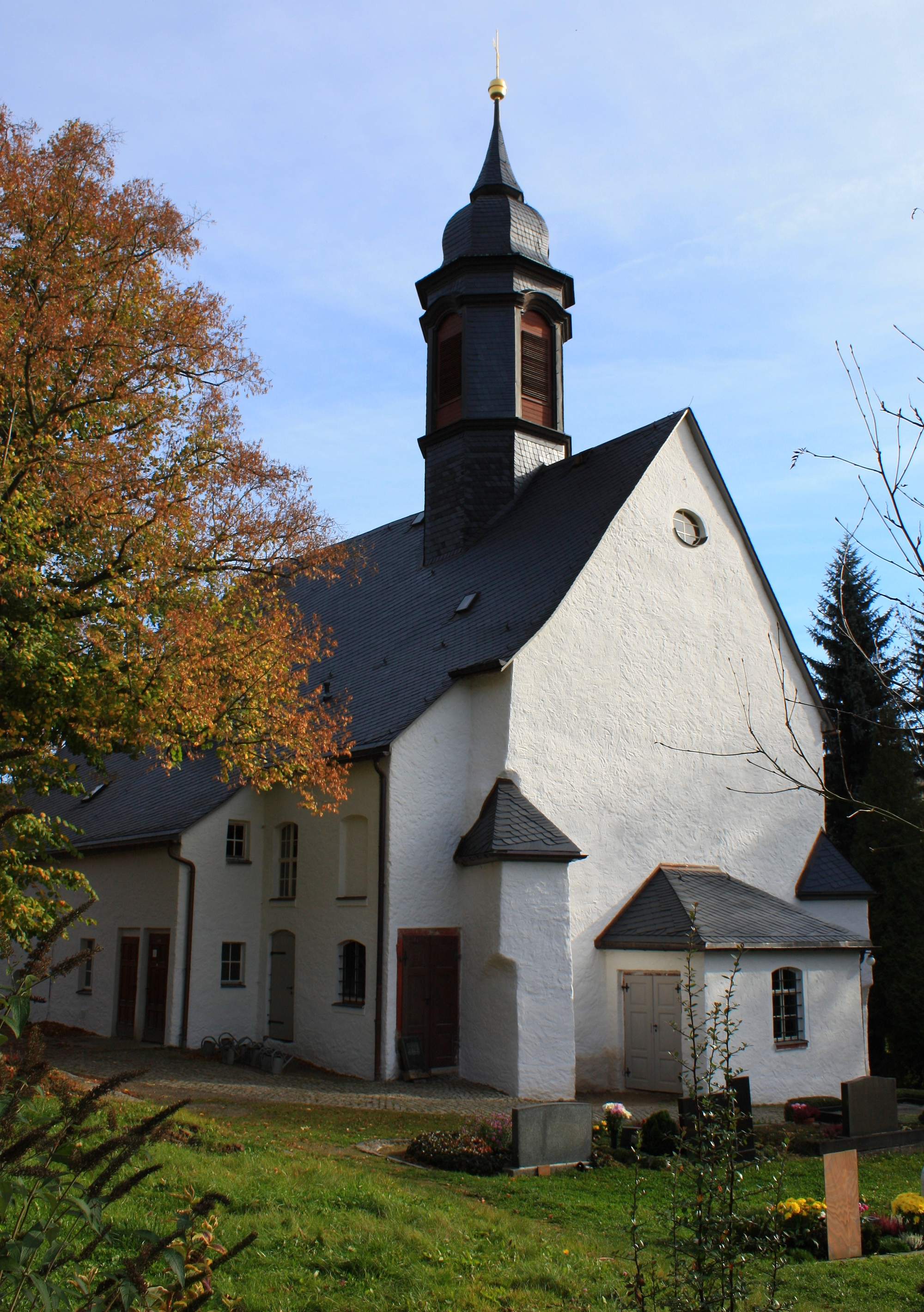
Raschau church

In the earliest centuries of settlement in the valley, the villagers had to go to Markersbach to attend church services. Even in Catholic times, however, Raschau must have acquired its own church, for in 1460, Raschau was described as a branch parish of Markersbach. As late as the early 16th century, the monks from the Grünhain Monastery were supplying church services before Raschau, in the course of the Reformation, acquired its own minister. The exact time when the Evangelical Allerheiligenkirche (“All Hallows’ Church”) arose is unknown. In 1925, 3,942 of the 3,777 inhabitants were adherents of the Lutheran faith, 26 were Catholic and 105 either held other beliefs or had none. Since 2001 Raschau has formed a parish with the St.-Annen-Kirchgemeinde (“Saint Anne’s Parish”) in Grünstädtel. Furthermore, since 2006, a sister church relationship has existed with the St.-Barbara-Kirchgemeinde in Markersbach. Raschau is also the local Evangelical Methodist Church region's namesake; this region includes Raschau, Markersbach and Scheibenberg. There is a Methodist church near the railway station.

=== Population development ===
Population growth reached its peak in the 1960s with a figure of 6,283 in 1964. In 1990, there were only 5,181 inhabitants reported in Raschau (source: Statistisches Landesamt). Through the 1990s, the population figure once again fell sharply, so that by 2005, it had fallen by roughly one fifth of the 1990 figure, to 4,090 (ibid. ). This has become a trend, and in the middle term, the population's average age is set to rise markedly.

Year	Inhabitants	Year	Inhabitants
about 1200	22 farming families	1910	3,171
1531	30 hereditary property owners, 9 further household heads, 5 housemates	1939	3,972
1628	35 hereditary landowners, 15 crofters, 34 cottagers as well as "Juncker Rudolff von Schmertzing an langen bergk"	1946	3,955
1764	41 hereditary landowners, 12 crofters, 57 cottagers	1950	5,395
1807	104 hereditary landowners, crofters and cottagers	1964	6,283
1834	2,132 Inhabitants	1990	5,181
1871	2,268	2006	3,952

=== Industrialization ===
The offshoots of industrialization reached Raschau only in the second half of the 19th century. In 1859, Wilhelm Merkel founded Raschau's first factory, a cork factory that can still be recognized from a distance, empty and forsaken though it now is. Merkel began with only five workers, but the cork factory developed quickly under his successor, becoming the community's main employer. By 1888, there were 100 employees, and by 1913 there were 350 earning their livings by manufacturing cork.

In the 1880s Emil Freitag's wood grinding shop came into being, soon coming to specialize in cardboard making. Within a few years, the factory expanded into two new works, and later to other communities. The business survived both world wars as well as East Germany, and is still in business today under the name Kartonagen Raschau.

Raschau's connection to the Schwarzenberg-Annaberg railway line in 1889 fostered the establishment of further factories. By the turn of the century there were, alongside the aforesaid factories, also a case factory, a stucco factory, a paper covering factory, a machine factory, a locksmith’s shop and an engine works.

== Politics ==
=== Mayor ===
Raschau’s chief mayor is Henry Solbrig (FWG Raschau), born in 1947, who was confirmed in office after receiving 97.2% of the vote in the mayoral election on 10 June 2001. No-one opposed his candidacy.

The town hall, which is today also the seat of the Raschau-Markersbach-Pöhla administrative community, was dedicated on 11 November 1907 under then mayor Max Jäger.

=== Coat of arms ===
How the community’s arms came to be is not known with any certainty, as no source can be authenticated. However, the arms might be heraldically described thus: In gules a horse springing argent upon a three-knolled hill (Dreiberg in German heraldry) vert. Quite likely the arms refer to Raschau’s history as a farming village; however, it is also possible that the arms suggest a name origin of "Ross-Au" ("Ross" is a German word for “horse” or “steed”). This possibility, however, is deemed unlikely today.

== Culture and sightseeing ==
=== Museums ===
Closely bound with Raschau's history is the village's oldest mill, which had a documentary mention as early as 1240. There are guided tours the year round, and once a year the mill is operated.

=== Buildings ===
- "Allerheiligenkirche"
- farmhouses built in half-timbered style, the oldest from 1687.

=== Education ===
The first report of a school in Raschau comes from the second half of the 16th century. The village's first teacher, Martin Mankrafft, could do no more than read and write. Whatever further development the educational landscape in Raschau underwent has hardly been researched. All that is known for sure is that, from the beginning, there was only ever one teacher. Only when the village's population began to swell markedly was the teacher in Raschau sent an assistant. Thus was the schoolteacher from Bernsbach, Immanuel Ficker active in Raschau for more than 50 years, being supported in his later years by a younger colleague from Hirschfeld. In 1836, there were a boys’ school and a girls’ school, in each of which one teacher had to teach classes with an average of more than 80 pupils. Since the two schoolhouses were no longer up to the task of handling the growing numbers of pupils, a third schoolhouse was procured in 1848 and the youngest pupils were to be taught by a newly hired third teacher. After the condition of the boys’ school no longer allowed for proper instruction in 1877, the construction of a new school was approved. This was built in 1883 and dedicated the following year. By the end of the century, Raschau counted five teachers who taught almost 600 pupils in all. In 1919 there were eight educators who nevertheless still had to manage enormous classes with 70 pupils. In the last few months of the Second World War, there was no more regular instruction. The schoolhouse had been taken over for quite a different purpose, namely to house refugees. On 1 September 1945, instruction provisionally began again. In the 1947–1948 school year, 13 new teachers, whose training had been fast-tracked for the occasion, were hired. In 1950, the Raschau elementary school was renamed Erweiterte Oberschule Bertolt Brecht. Through the 1950s, the school was continually expanded so that by 1958, a ten-class teaching system had been established. In 1973, the school was once again given a new name. It would now be called the Clara-Zetkin-Oberschule.

After many mineworkers began to convert their lodgings in the Siedlung des Friedens (“Peace Estate”) into family flats beginning in the 1950s, there arose the need for the estate's children to have their own school. This was first housed in a building whose use had until then been foreseen for Soviet military personnel and in the 1960s, owing to the ever-growing numbers of pupils, it was expanded. Finally, in the 1970s, a completely new school building was built, taking on its function in October 1973, and two years later being dubbed the Paul-Blechschmidt-Oberschule.

In the early 1990s, East Germany's school system was cast aside. Since then, the Clara-Zetkin-Oberschule has served as a primary school. The Mittelschule Raschau that had sprung from the former Paul-Blechschmidt-Oberschule was dissolved in the mid-2000s owing to low pupil numbers. Today's Grundschule Raschau is attended by pupils from Raschau, Langenberg and Markersbach.

== Famous people ==
=== Sons and daughters of the community ===
On 20 March 1786, Dorothea Friederica Peck, the then Raschau minister's daughter, was buried at Raschau's churchyard. She had been involved with the later educator and theologian Gustav Friedrich Dinter, for in her gravestone inscription can be seen the words Dinters Braut (“Dinter’s bride”). Still today, the Dinterkreuz can be found in Raschau, a cross that commemorates Dinter, who died in 1839.

=== Other celebrities connected with the community ===
- Ortrun Enderlein (b. 1943), two-time Women's World Champion and first women's Olympic gold medallist in luge (1964).
