= Grünhain-Beierfeld =

- Town
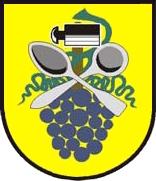
- Coat of arms

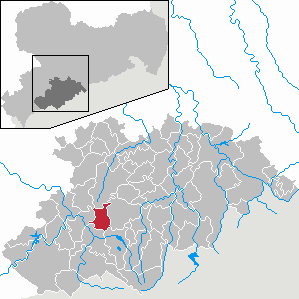
- Location of Grünhain-Beierfeld within Erzgebirgskreis district
- Interactive map of Grünhain-Beierfeld
- Location within Germany Location within Saxony
- Coordinates: 50°34′N 12°48′E
- Country: Germany
- State: Saxony
- District: Erzgebirgskreis
- Subdivisions: 3

Government
  - Mayor (2022–29): Mirko Geißler

Area
  - Total: 22.25 km^{2} (8.59 sq mi)

Population (2025-12-31)
  - Total: 5,483
  - Density: 246.4/km^{2} (638.2/sq mi)
- Time zone: UTC+01:00 (CET)
  - Summer (DST): UTC+02:00 (CEST)
- Postal codes: 08344
- Dialling codes: 03774
- Vehicle registration: ERZ, ANA, ASZ, AU, MAB, MEK, STL, SZB, ZP
- Website: www.gruenhain-beierfeld.de

Grünhain-Beierfeld (German pronunciation: [ˈɡʁyːnhaɪn ˈbaɪɐfɛlt]) is a town in the district of Erzgebirgskreis in Saxony, Germany lying 8 km east of Aue. It came into being on 1 January 2005 through the merger of the town of Grünhain and the community of Beierfeld.

== Geography ==
=== Location ===
The town lies in the northeast of the district. The highest point in the municipal area is the Spiegelwald (forest) at 738 m above sea level.

=== Neighbouring communities ===
In the north, the town borders on Zwönitz, in the east on Elterlein, in the south on Raschau, in the southwest on Schwarzenberg and in the west on Bernsbach and Lößnitz.

=== Constituent communities ===
Grünhain-Beierfeld has three of these:

- Beierfeld
- Grünhain
- Waschleithe

== History ==
=== Beierfeld ===
The area around Beierfeld was settled in the 12th century. As with most other places in the Ore Mountains, Beierfeld was laid out as a forest village (Waldhufendorf). The town's name hints at Bavarian colonists (the first two syllables, “Beier” are pronounced the same way as the German word Bayer, which means “Bavarian”). In 1233, Beierfeld became a monastic domain with Meinhard II of Wirbene's endowment of the Grünhain Monastery. The abbot at Grünhain thereby held jurisdiction over the community until the Reformation and he received rent and socage from it.

When mining came, however, the transition from a purely agricultural community to an industrially based one began. The cutlery makers’ rising fortunes in the 17th and 18th centuries, as well as the plating industry's in the 19th century, established the town's main fields of business. From beginnings in producing handmade house and kitchen machines grew factory production in large enterprises by the beginning of the 20th century.

=== Grünhain ===
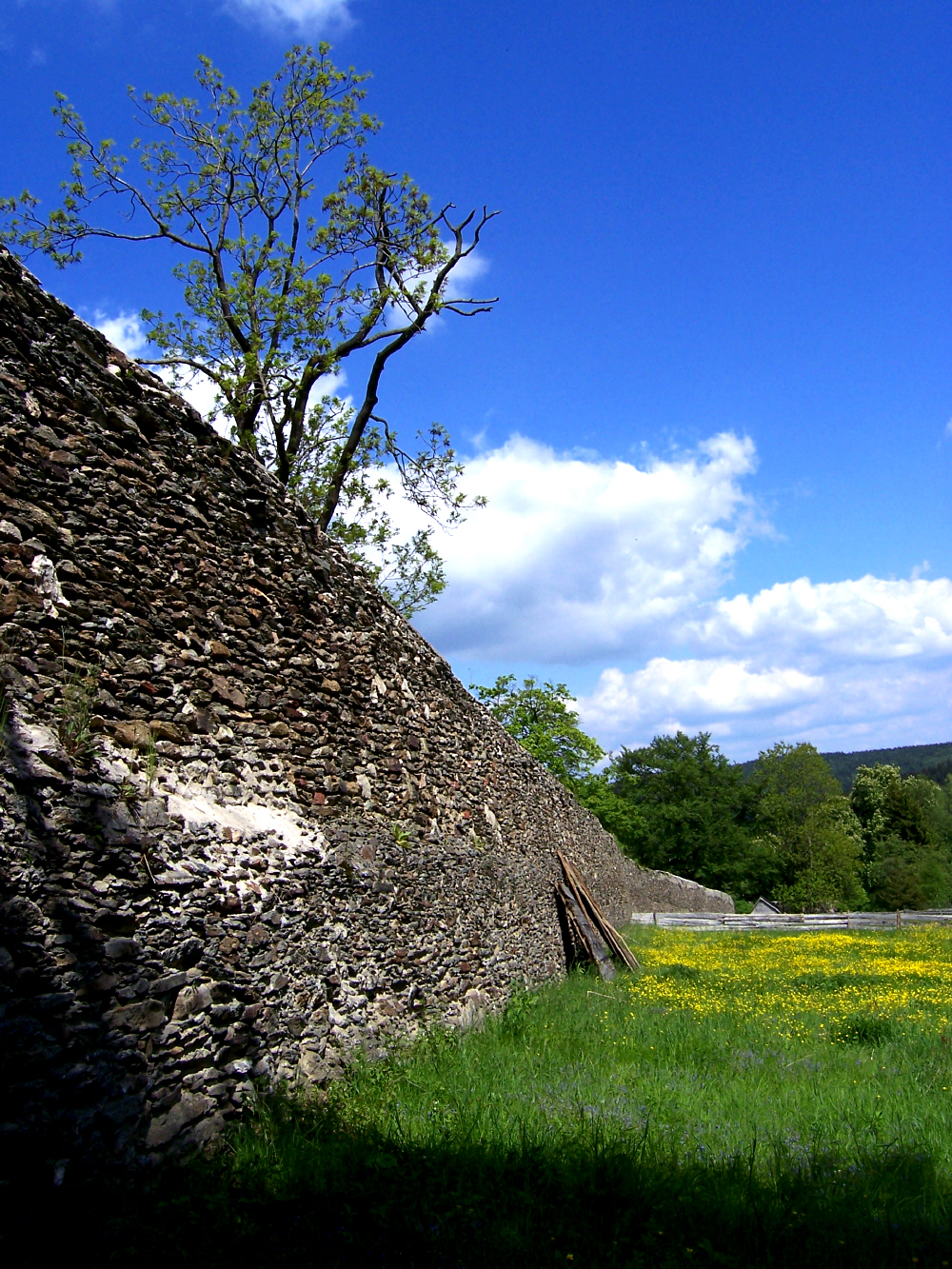
Monastery wall in Grünhain

Grünhain had its first documentary mention in 1150. The location on the salt road from Halle (Saale) to the Preßnitzer Pass and on to Bohemia convinced Cistercian monks to come and found a monastery here. In 1276, Grünhain was granted town rights. Until the 15th century, the monastery extended its sphere of influence, mainly through donations. At the onset of the Reformation, the monastery held sway over more than 56 villages and three towns. The Reformation and the Thirty Years' War were the monastery's downfall.

=== Waschleithe ===
Waschleithe had its first documentary mention in 1531. Already by the 13th century, mining had begun in the Oswald Valley, where Waschleithe lies. Besides silver, tin and iron, marble was also later quarried. Mining continued until 1920. Mining also yielded the place's name, which refers to an ore washing operation on a ridge.

=== Amalgamations ===
On 1 January 1999 came Waschleithe's amalgamation with Beierfeld.

On 1 January 2005 came Grünhain's and Beierfeld's amalgamation, along with a name change to Grünhain-Beierfeld.

== Culture and sightseeing ==
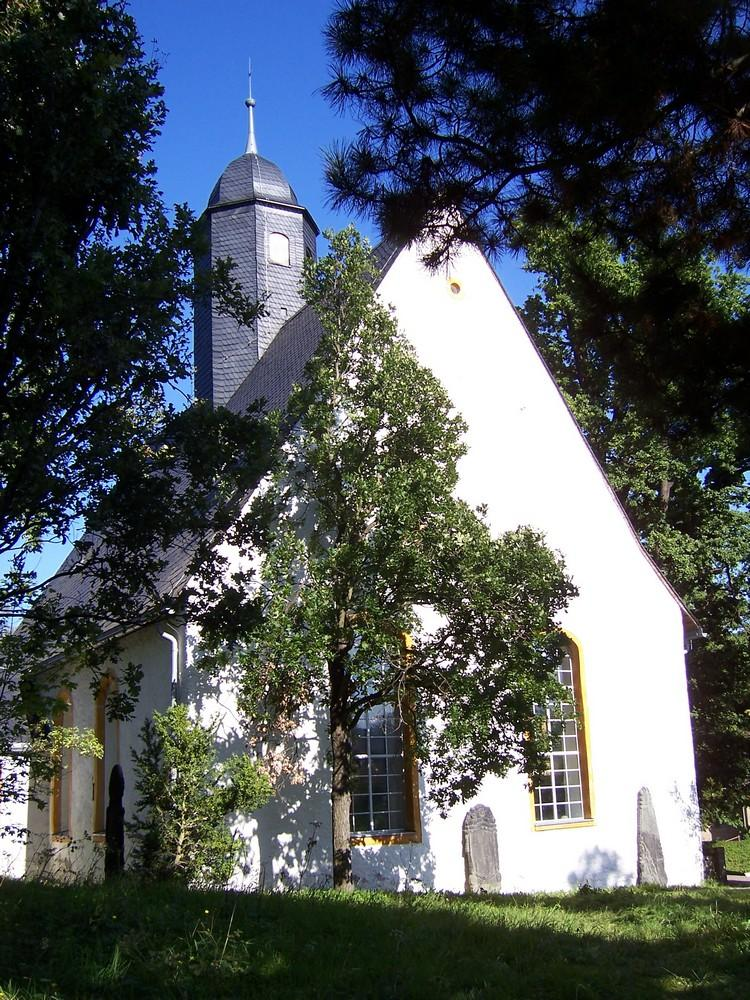
Peter-Pauls-Kirche in Beierfeld

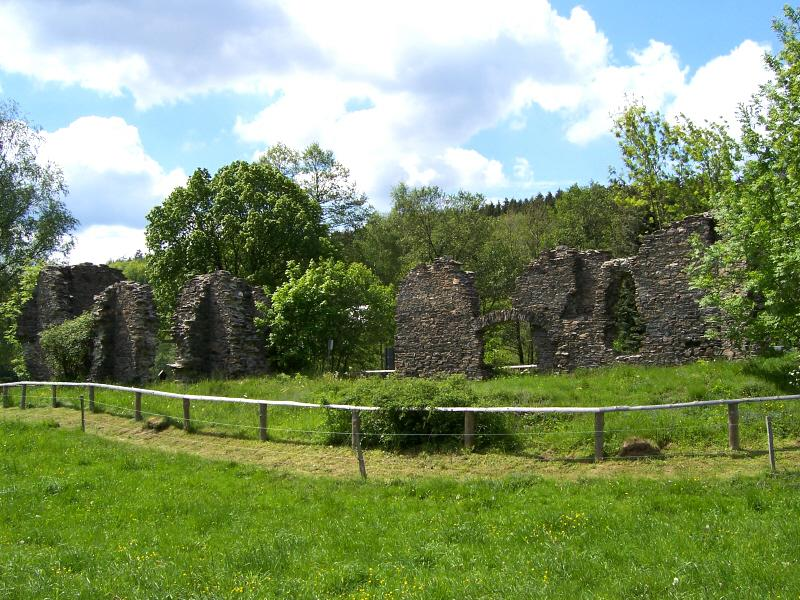
Ruins of the Dudelskirche in Waschleithe

=== Museums ===
- Zur Heimatecke exhibition in Waschleithe
- Herkules-Frisch-Glück demonstration mine in Waschleithe
- Beierfeld Red Cross Museum

=== Music ===
- Original Grünhainer Jagdhornbläser (“hunting horn blowers”)

=== Buildings ===
- Remains of the Grünhain Cistercian monastery
- Ruins of Saint Oswald's Church (Dudelskirche) in Waschleithe
- Peter-Pauls Kirche in Beierfeld
- St. Nicolai Kirche in Grünhain
- König-Albert-Turm (King Albert Tower)

=== Parks ===
- Natur- und Wildpark Waschleithe (nature and wilderness park)

=== Sport ===
- Naturbad Grünhain (“nature bath”)

=== Regular events ===
- Löffelmacherfest in Beierfeld (spoonmakers’ festival)
- Klosterfestspiele in Grünhain (“monastery festival games”)
- Harzerfest in Waschleithe

The three festivals are held in turn, one each year.

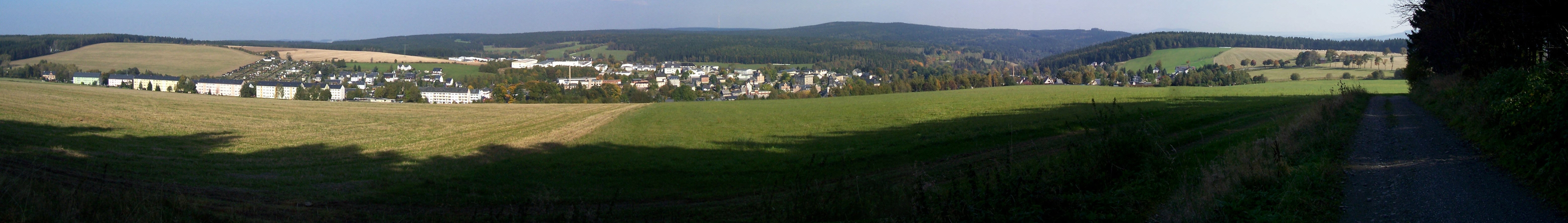
View from the Spiegelwald over Grünhain (In the background is the Schatzenstein.)

== Economy and infrastructure ==
=== Transport ===
Grünhain-Beierfeld is not connected to any other community by Federal Highway (Bundesstraße); however, the most important connections are the road to Schwarzenberg, near which runs the Bundesstraße 101, and the road to Zwönitz to a feeder road to the Bundesautobahn 72.

=== Media ===
- Kabel Journal

=== Education ===
- 2 primary schools
- 1 middle school
- 1 vocational school centre

== Famous people ==
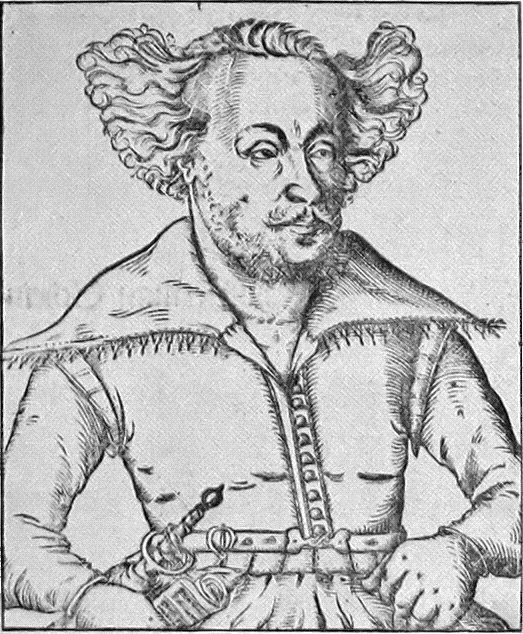
Johann Hermann Schein

=== Sons and daughters of the town ===
- Johann Hermann Schein (1586-1630), Thomanerchor Kantor, born in Grünhain
- Fritz Körner (1873-1930), Ore Mountain dialect poet, born in Waschleithe, died in Beierfeld
- Liselotte Pieser (1917-1998), economist and politician (CDU), Member of the Bundestag, born in Beierfeld

=== People with connections to the town ===
- Kunz von Kaufungen (ca. 1410-1455), mastermind of the Altenburg Princely Robbery, was caught near Waschleithe
- Johann Gabriel Löbel (1635–1696), glassworks owner and pig iron producer, died in Grünhain
- Thomas Köhler (1940- ), double Olympic medallist in luge, lived for a time in Beierfeld
- Ortrun Enderlein (1943- ), luge competitor, worked at the Beierfeld measuring instrument works
