= Lauter, Saxony =

Lauter
- Ortsteil of Lauter-Bernsbach
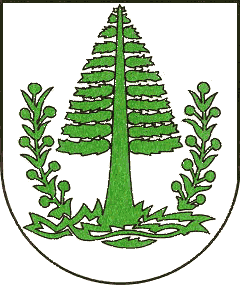
- Coat of arms
- Interactive map of Lauter
- Location within Germany Location within Saxony
- Coordinates: 50°34′N 12°44′E
- Country: Germany
- State: Saxony
- District: Erzgebirgskreis
- Town: Lauter-Bernsbach

Area
  - Total: 21.55 km^{2} (8.32 sq mi)
- Elevation: 480 m (1,570 ft)

Population (2011-12-31)
  - Total: 4,707
  - Density: 218.4/km^{2} (565.7/sq mi)
- Time zone: UTC+01:00 (CET)
  - Summer (DST): UTC+02:00 (CEST)
- Postal codes: 08312
- Dialling codes: 03771
- Vehicle registration: ERZ

Lauter (German: [ˈlaʊtɐ]) is a town in the district of Erzgebirgskreis in Saxony, Germany. It lies between the two towns of Aue and Schwarzenberg. It lies in the Ore Mountains, 4 km southeast of Aue, and 4 km northwest of Schwarzenberg, has about 4,700 inhabitants in an area of 21.55 km^{2} and belongs to the Town League of Silberberg (Städtebund Silberberg). Since 1 January 2013, it is part of the town Lauter-Bernsbach.

Through the town runs the Silver Road, the B 101. Lauter has a station on the Zwickau–Schwarzenberg railway and is served by Regionalbahn trains, operated by Erzgebirgsbahn (a subsidiary of Deutsche Bahn) between Zwickau and Johanngeorgenstadt.

== History ==
The town arose from a forest village (Waldhufendorf) established in the late 12th century on the western ridge of the Schwarzwasser Valley. The name is recorded over the centuries as Lawther (1460), Lawte (1501) and Lauttera (1590). The town draws this name from a brook called die Lauter, although this name is now no longer used for any waterway.

Besides agriculture and log driving, mining and basket making afforded the population livelihoods. When industrialization began in the 19th century, many machine factories, and metal- and woodworking businesses as well as an enamel factory set up shop in town. From 1952 to 1990, Lauter was part of the Bezirk Karl-Marx-Stadt of East Germany. Town rights were conferred in 1962.

In the early 1950s, the BSG Empor Lauter football club played successfully in the DDR-Oberliga, until it was delegated to Rostock in 1954. Its successor club Hansa Rostock played in the Bundesliga.

=== Population development ===
The following figures refer to 31 December in each given year.

1982 to 1988

- 1982 − 6778
- 1983 − 6659
- 1984 − 6567
- 1985 − 6457
- 1986 − 6299
- 1987 − 6200
- 1988 − 6107

1989 to 1995

- 1989 − 5880
- 1990 − 5589
- 1991 − 5442
- 1992 − 5399
- 1993 − 5328
- 1994 − 5499
- 1995 − 5401

1996 to 2002

- 1996 − 5303
- 1997 − 5283
- 1998 − 5255
- 1999 − 5185
- 2000 − 5199
- 2001 − 5135
- 2002 − 5103

2003 to 2006

- 2003 − 5066
- 2004 − 5007
- 2005 − 4968
- 2006 − 4927

Source: Statistisches Landesamt des Freistaates Sachsen

== Notable people ==
- Steffi Martin (1962–2017), luger, Olympic medalist; lived here
