= Bernsbach =

Village in Saxony, Germany

- Ortsteil of Lauter-Bernsbach
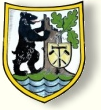
- Coat of arms
- Interactive map of Bernsbach
- Location within Germany Location within Saxony
- Coordinates: 50°35′N 12°46′E
- Country: Germany
- State: Saxony
- District: Erzgebirgskreis
- Town: Lauter-Bernsbach

Area
  - Total: 8.75 km^{2} (3.38 sq mi)
- Elevation: 394–728 m (1,293–2,388 ft)

Population (2011-12-31)
  - Total: 4,480
  - Density: 512/km^{2} (1,330/sq mi)
- Time zone: UTC+01:00 (CET)
  - Summer (DST): UTC+02:00 (CEST)
- Postal codes: 08315
- Dialling codes: 03774, 03771
- Vehicle registration: ERZ

Bernsbach (German pronunciation: [ˈbɛʁnsbax]) is a village and a former municipality in the district of Erzgebirgskreis in Saxony in Germany that together with its constituent community of Oberpfannenstiel has roughly 4,700 inhabitants. Since 1 January 2013, it is part of the town Lauter-Bernsbach.

== Geography ==
The community stretches from the valley of the river Schwarzwasser up to the Spiegelwald (forest) at 728 m above sea level, thereby offering a good view over the Ore Mountain towns of Aue and Schwarzenberg. This has led to Bernsbach’s nickname Balkon des Erzgebirges (“Ore Mountains’ Balcony”).

== History ==
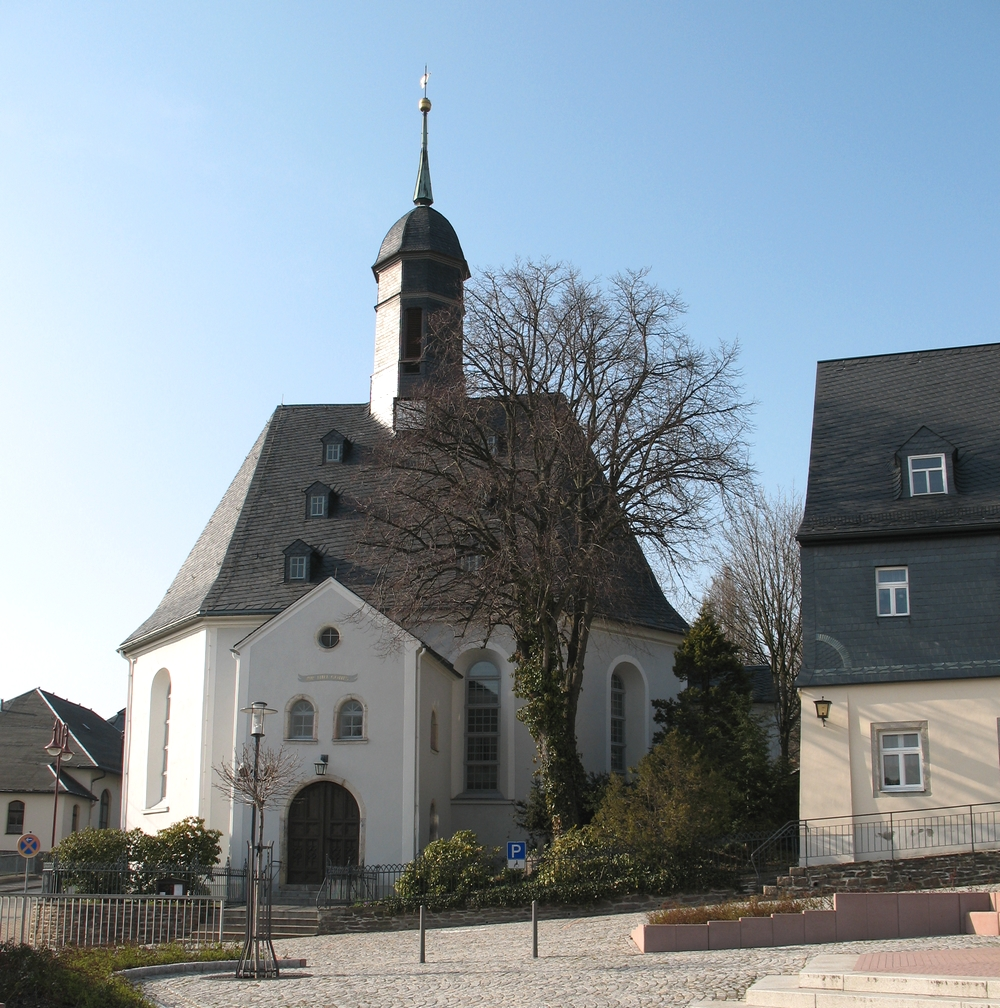
Bernsbach’s village square and church

It is believed that Bernsbach was founded about 1200 by Frankish settlers. It had its first documentary mention in 1240 under the name Wernhardispach. About 1460, it was named in the gazetteer compiled by the Zwickau Franciscans as Pernsbach. At this time, Bernsbach belonged to the Grünhain Monastery, after whose dissolution in 1536 it passed to the Amt of Grünhain. In 1874, the community was assigned to the Amt court of Schwarzenberg, and since 1950 it has belonged to the court district of Aue.

From 1679 to 1681, a church was built in the middle of the community, thereby splitting Bernsbach from the neighbouring community of Beierfeld, to whose parish it had hitherto belonged.

During the community’s mining heyday, the Ore Mountains yielded forth iron, silver and sulphur. The ores were processed at a smelter. About 1538, hammer millers and tinners settled in the upper village, thereby bringing their skills at crafting metal by hand to what was once purely a farming community. To supply the ovens with fuel, charburners, among others, came to town.

Further skilled trades had also set up shop in town by the 17th century, among them cutlers and lace tatters. In the years around 1800, there was also to be found in Bernsbach the craft of making official stamps and coats of arms. With the coming of the railway line from Zwönitz to Scheibenberg in 1900 also came another upswing in the resident economy.

The old traditions of making blackplate and tinplate as well as ironware manufacturing are still honoured in Bernsbach today.

From 1952 to 1990, Bernsbach was part of the Bezirk Karl-Marx-Stadt of East Germany. In 1987, the community celebrated 750 years of existence, based on a mention from the year 1237.

=== Population development ===
All following figures are for 31 December in the given year.

1982 to 1988

- 1982 − 5049
- 1983 − 4968
- 1984 − 4922
- 1985 − 4827
- 1986 − 4703
- 1987 − 4619
- 1988 − 4530

1989 to 1995

- 1989 − 4360
- 1990 − 4220
- 1991 − 4119
- 1992 − 4057
- 1993 − 4025
- 1994 − 4233
- 1995 − 4568

1996 to 2002

- 1996 − 4778
- 1997 − 4847
- 1998 − 4847
- 1999 − 4747
- 2000 − 4714
- 2001 − 4740
- 2002 − 4761

2003 to 2006

- 2003 − 4719
- 2004 − 4714
- 2005 − 4632
- 2006 − 4562

Source: Statistisches Landesamt des Freistaates Sachsen

== Partner towns ==
- (Germany) Vohenstrauß, Bavaria

== Clubs ==
- SV Saxonia Bernsbach
- TV 1864 Bernsbach (gymnastic club)
- Bernsbacher Musikanten e. V. (wind instrument club)

== Famous people ==
- Karl Wolf, German national football player for the East Germany national football team
- Siegfried Wolf, German national football player for the East Germany national football team
- Armin Härtel, first bishop of the United Methodist Church in East Germany from 1970 to 1986.
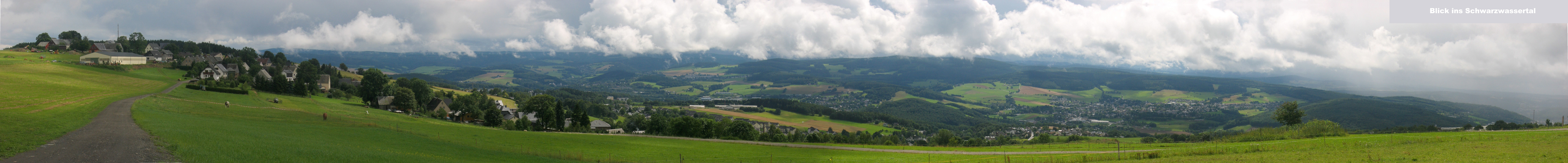
