= Wolfgang Uhle =

German Lutheran priest

Wolfgang Uhle (1512 in Elterlein – 7 April 1594, in Breitenbrunn) was a German Lutheran priest, known as "the Plague Pastor of Annaberg" (Pestpfarrer von Annaberg).

== Life ==
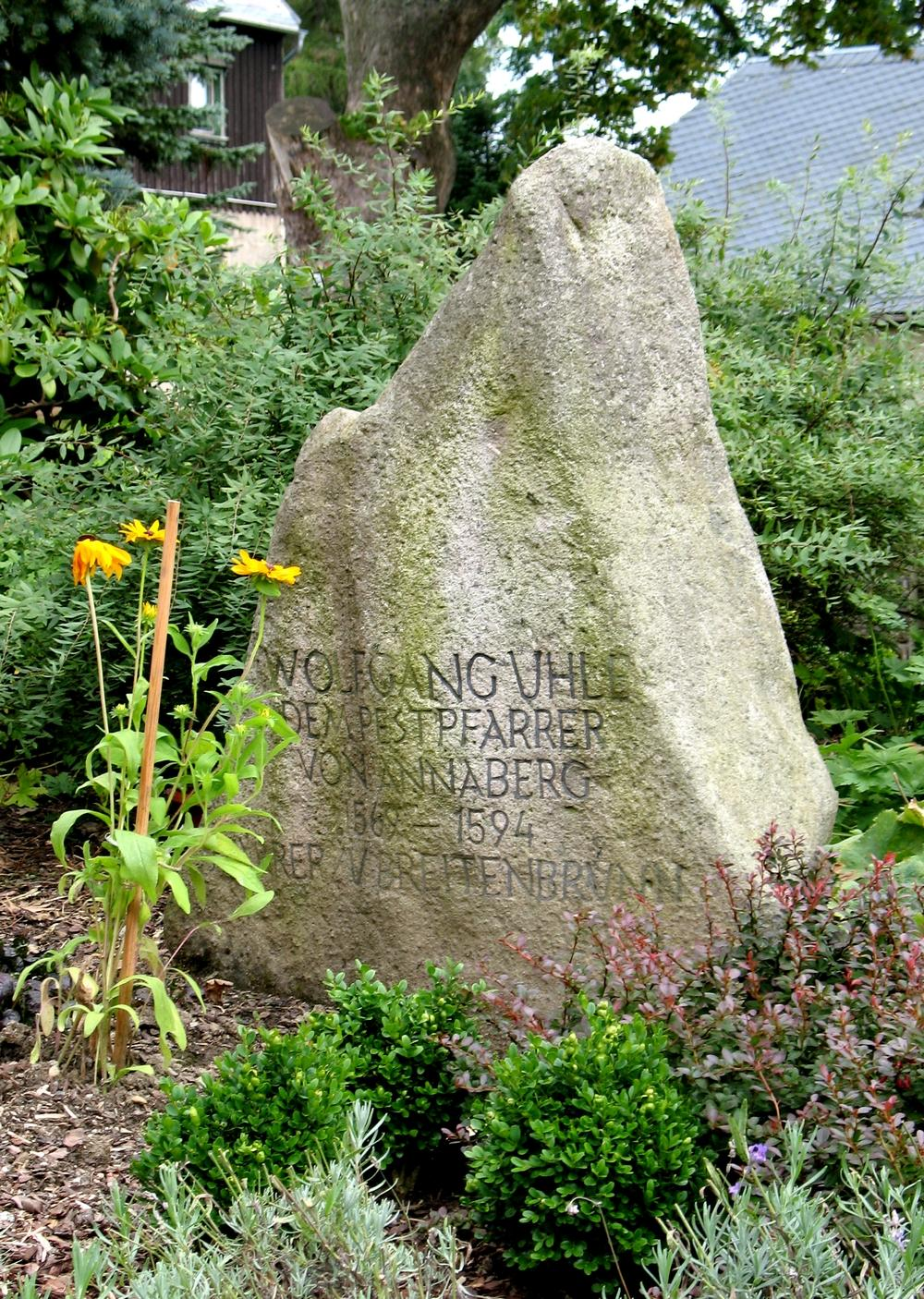
Memorial stone at the Breitenbrunn Church

Wolfgang Uhle was born in 1512 in Elterlein. He was brought up as the son of a burgher in the little town of Elterlein. After finishing school he studied theology at Leipzig and came in contact with the doctrines of the Reformation. In 1542 he was ordained in Wittenberg and took over the deacon's post in Neustädtel (Schneeberg). Thereafter he was the Evangelical pastor in Lauterbach, Stollberg and Oberlungwitz. In 1558 he became pastor in Clausnitz, where his family bought an estate in 1561.

Legend has it that, during this time, a dispute arose between Uhle and the Clausnitz's corrupt judge, Ortsrichter Georg Biber, which escalated in 1563. The pastor, who had had a tendency to become angry since he was young, slew the judge and then fled into the woods to the Bohemian side of the Ore Mountains. In the absence Uhle was sentenced to death for murder by the court (Halsgericht).

Existing sources, however, show no evidence either of the relationship between the minister and the judge, nor the outcome of the judicial process. What is known is that Bieber was killed on 10 July 1563, as Uhle's successor noted in the Clausnitz's parish records.

In the year 1563, on 10 July, which was the Saturday after St. Kilian's, the Clausnitz judge, George Bieber, was killed with a pointed hammer, which was the judge's, by the minister, Mr Wolff Ulen by name, in the lower part of the village near the smelting works. (Im 1563 Jare, den 10 July, welcher war der Sonabent nach Kiliani, ist der Richter zur Clausnitz George Bieber von dem Pfarrer daselbst, Herr Wolff Ulen genant, mit einem spitzigen husserischem Hammer, welcher des Richters gewesen, erschlagen worden, unten im Dorff bey der Schmelzhütten.)

The pastor was clearly named as the accused. He initially escaped a "short trial" and then asked for safe conduct from the prince-elector to face a "proper trial". Whether Uhle was convicted of murder at the end of the trial is doubtful. He may have been convicted of manslaughter, or the death of the judge may have been viewed as a case of self-defense or even an accident.

In 1565 the plague broke out in Annaberg. From Uhle's autobiography published by Gertrude Busch (see below) it is possible that, the following year, but certainly by 1568, Wolfgang Uhle was in Annaberg as the "plague pastor" (Pestpfarrer). Legend has it that Uhle offered to work in the town in this role on condition that he was pardoned. The town accepted his offer, as scarcely any other pastor would come forward voluntarily to work in the town which was hit by the disease, and they pleaded on his behalf with the prince-elector. After his pardon by Augustus, Wolfgang Uhle took up his post.

Indeed, the accounts show that Uhle worked from October 1566 until the end of April 1568 in three periods in Annaberg as a pastor caring for the "poisoned people". Despite his constant contact with those infected, nursing and providing spiritual care to the dying, Uhle was clearly not affected by the disease. Likewise, his successor, Petrus Schüler (or Schiller), who began in 1568, was spared even though, during his time, the epidemic reached its peak.

His remarkable survival was probably seen as a form of judgement by God on Uhle. Uhle's credibility had been restored and confirmed. Certainly his sacrificial deeds were well-known beyond the town itself, so it was probably not difficult, after having held the office of plague pastor for him to resume a normal job again as a parish priest. From 1568 until his death Uhle worked for 25 years as a pastor in Breitenbrunn which was, at that time, dominated by mining and forestry. There he lived, initially with his wife, who died about 1577/78 after 48 years of marriage. He took care of all the parochial interests and was one of the few in the village who could read and write, he also taught their children.

On 7 April 1594, the first Sunday after Easter, Uhle suffered a stroke by the altar and died around one o'clock. Whether he was buried in the Breitenbrunn Church or in its associated cemetery is not known. At the edge of the churchyard in Breitenbrunn there is a stone in memory of Wolfgang Uhle. At the site near Clausnitz where the judge died there is also a Pastor Uhle Stone (Pfarrer-Uhle-Stein).

== Sources ==
- Gertrud Busch: Der Pestpfarrer von Annaberg, Schwarzenberg 1939 (a novel)
- Karl-Hans Pollmer: "Das Halsgericht...zu dreien Malen..." - Wolfgang Uhle, der Pestpfarrer von Annaberg/Dichtung und Wahrheit In: Erzgebirgische Heimatblätter 4/1980, pp. 93–95, ISSN 0232-6078
- Hans Burkhardt: Wolfgang Uhle, Pestpfarrer aus Annaberg, Leipzig 1995
- Gert Weidhas: Wolfgang Uhle, Zeugnisse und Mutmaßungen, Leipzig 2000 (Quellenstudium)
- Joachim Mehnert: Haltet den Pfaffen!, Vom Halsgericht am Purschenstein zur Pesthölle von Annaberg, Annaberg 2007
- Stephan Schmidt-Brücken: Neues vom Annaberger Pestpfarrer Wolfgang Uhle. In: Erzgebirgische Heimatblätter, 30 (2008), H. 2, pp. 24–26.
