= Markersbach viaduct =

Railway bridge in Saxony, Germany

Coordinates: 50.5359°N 12.8662°E

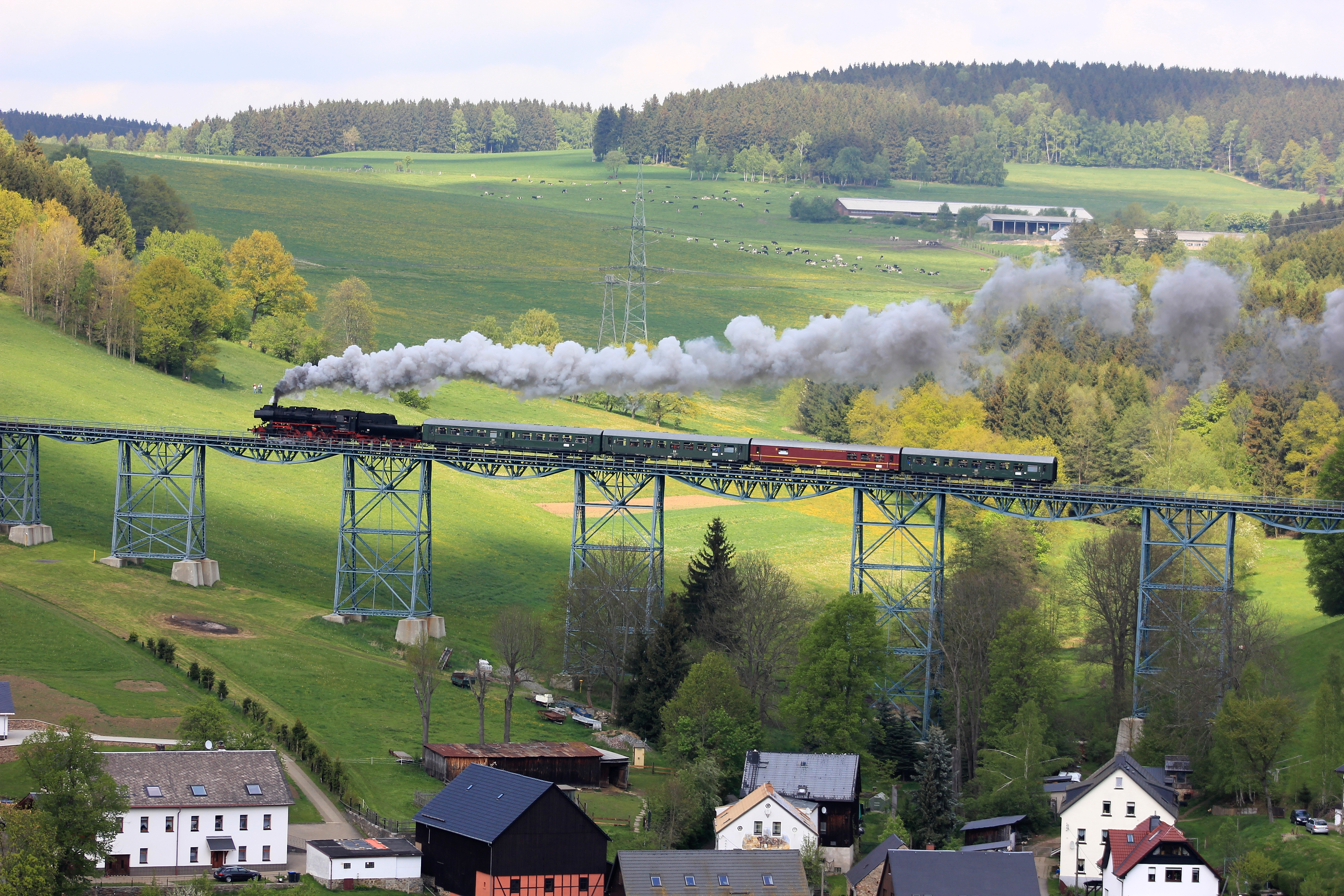
Historic steam locomotive pulling a train over the viaduct.

The Markersbach viaduct is an historic railway bridge located in Raschau-Markersbach, Germany.

Also known as the 'Matchstick Bridge', it is 236.5 m in length and 36.5 m in height.
