= Thomas Thumm =

German politician (born 1977)

Member of the Landtag of Saxony
- Incumbent
- Assumed office 1 October 2019
- Preceded by: Alexander Krauß
- Constituency: Erzgebirge 3

Personal details
- Born: 1977 (age 48–49)
- Party: Alternative for Germany

Thomas Thumm (born 1977) is a German politician serving as a member of the Landtag of Saxony since 2019. He has served as deputy chairman of the Alternative for Germany in the Erzgebirgskreis since 2022.
