= Markersbach Pumped Storage Power Plant =

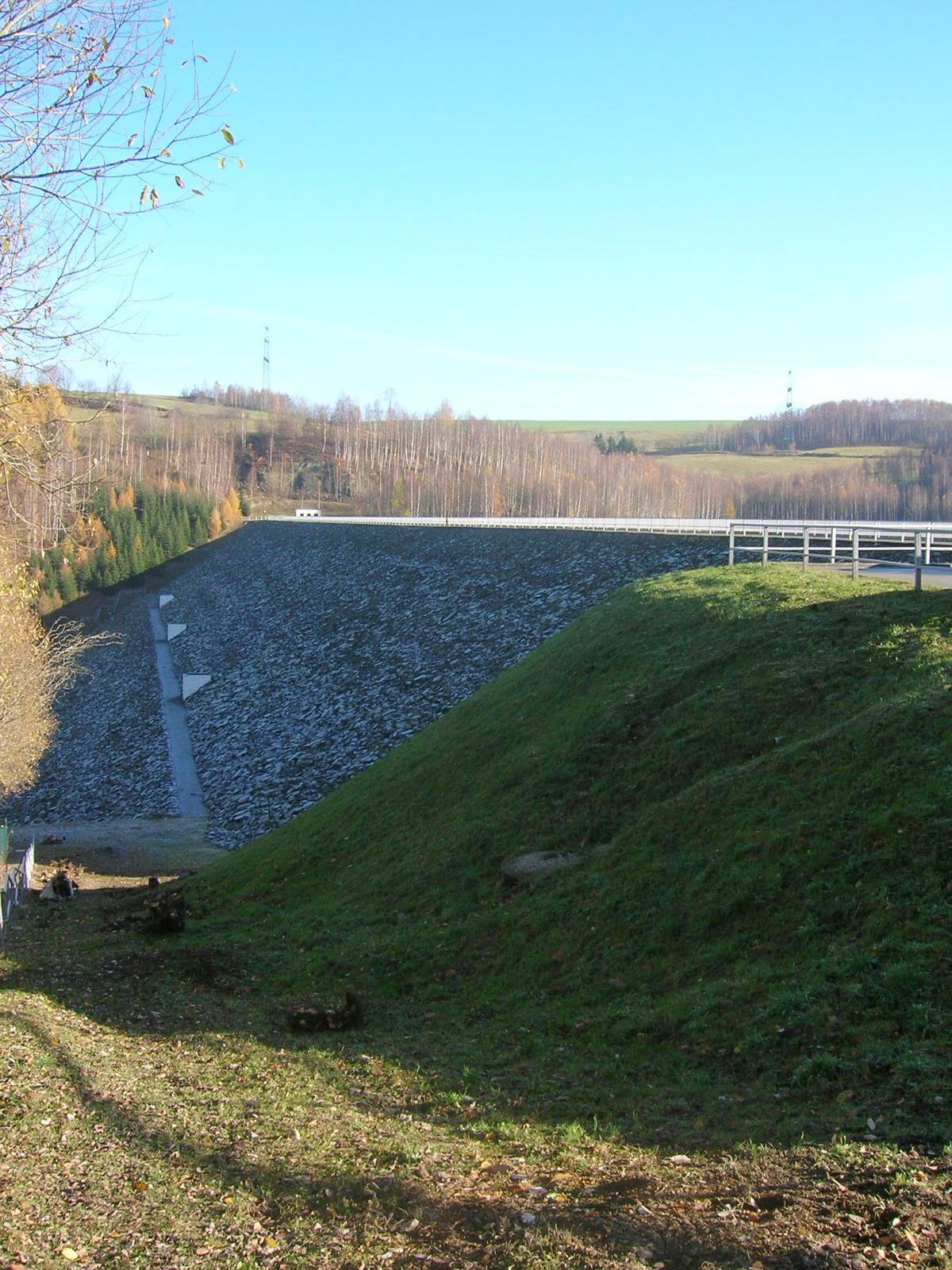
- The lower reservoir's dam
- Official name: Pumpspeicherwerk Markersbach
- Country: Germany
- Location: Markersbach
- Coordinates: 50°31′03″N 12°52′50″E
- Status: Operational
- Construction began: 1970
- Opening date: 1979; 46 years ago
- Owner(s): Vattenfall

Reservoir
- Creates: Markesbach Upper
- Total capacity: 6,300,000 m^{3} (5,107 acre⋅ft) (upper)

Power Station
- Hydraulic head: 288 m (945 ft)
- Turbines: 6 × 174.25 MW Francis pump turbine
- Installed capacity: 1,045 MW
- Annual generation: 980 GWh

The Markersbach Pumped Storage Power Plant is a hydroelectric power station utilizing pumped-storage technology in Markersbach, Saxony, Germany. The installed capacity of the power plant is 1,045 MW. It is Germany's second largest Pumped Storage Power Plant.

It is owned and operated by Vattenfall (Vattenfall Wasserkraft GmbH).

== History ==
Planning for the power plant began in 1961, construction began in 1970 and the generators were commissioned in 1979. The power station generates electricity by moving water between an upper and lower reservoir. During periods of low energy demand, water is pumped from the lower reservoir at an elevation of 563 m (1,847 ft) to an upper reservoir at 850 m (2,789 ft). When energy demand is high, the water is released back down towards the lower reservoir and fed through six 174.25 MW reversible Francis pump turbines, the same machines that pumped the water to the upper reservoir. The installed capacity of the power plant is 1,045 MW.

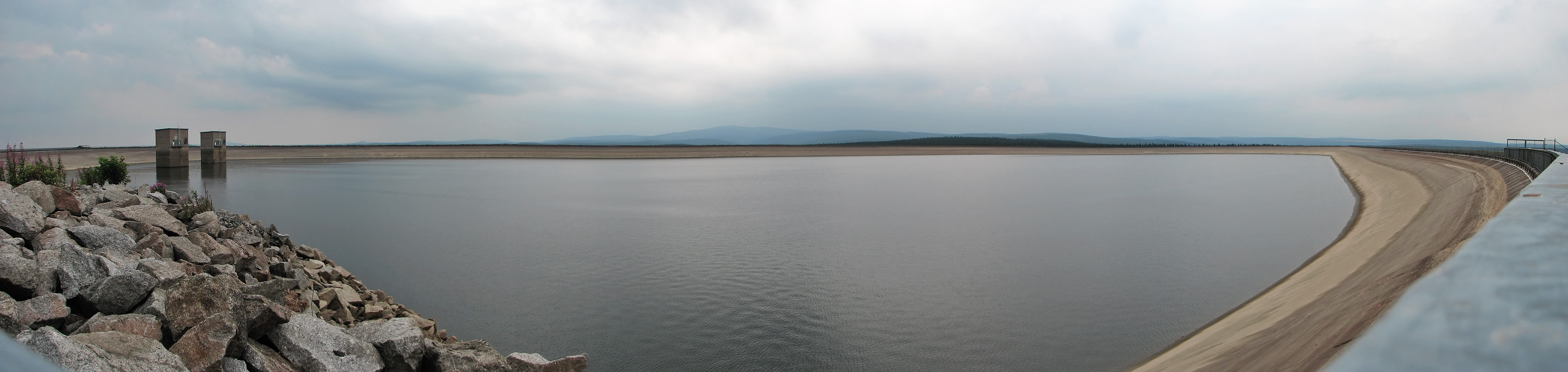
A panorama of the upper reservoir
