= Raschau-Markersbach =

- Municipality
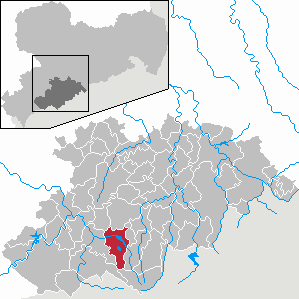
- Location of Raschau-Markersbach within Erzgebirgskreis district
- Interactive map of Raschau-Markersbach
- Location within Germany Location within Saxony
- Coordinates: 50°31′56″N 12°52′17″E
- Country: Germany
- State: Saxony
- District: Erzgebirgskreis

Government
  - Mayor (2022–29): Frank Tröger

Area
  - Total: 39.52 km^{2} (15.26 sq mi)
- Elevation: 420–830 m (1,380–2,720 ft)

Population (2025-12-31)
  - Total: 4,688
  - Density: 118.6/km^{2} (307.2/sq mi)
- Time zone: UTC+01:00 (CET)
  - Summer (DST): UTC+02:00 (CEST)
- Postal codes: 08352
- Dialling codes: 03774
- Vehicle registration: ERZ, ANA, ASZ, AU, MAB, MEK, STL, SZB, ZP
- Website: www.markersbach.de

Raschau-Markersbach is a municipality in the district of Erzgebirgskreis in Saxony, Germany. It was formed on 1 January 2008, by the merger of the former municipalities Markersbach and Raschau.

== Gallery ==
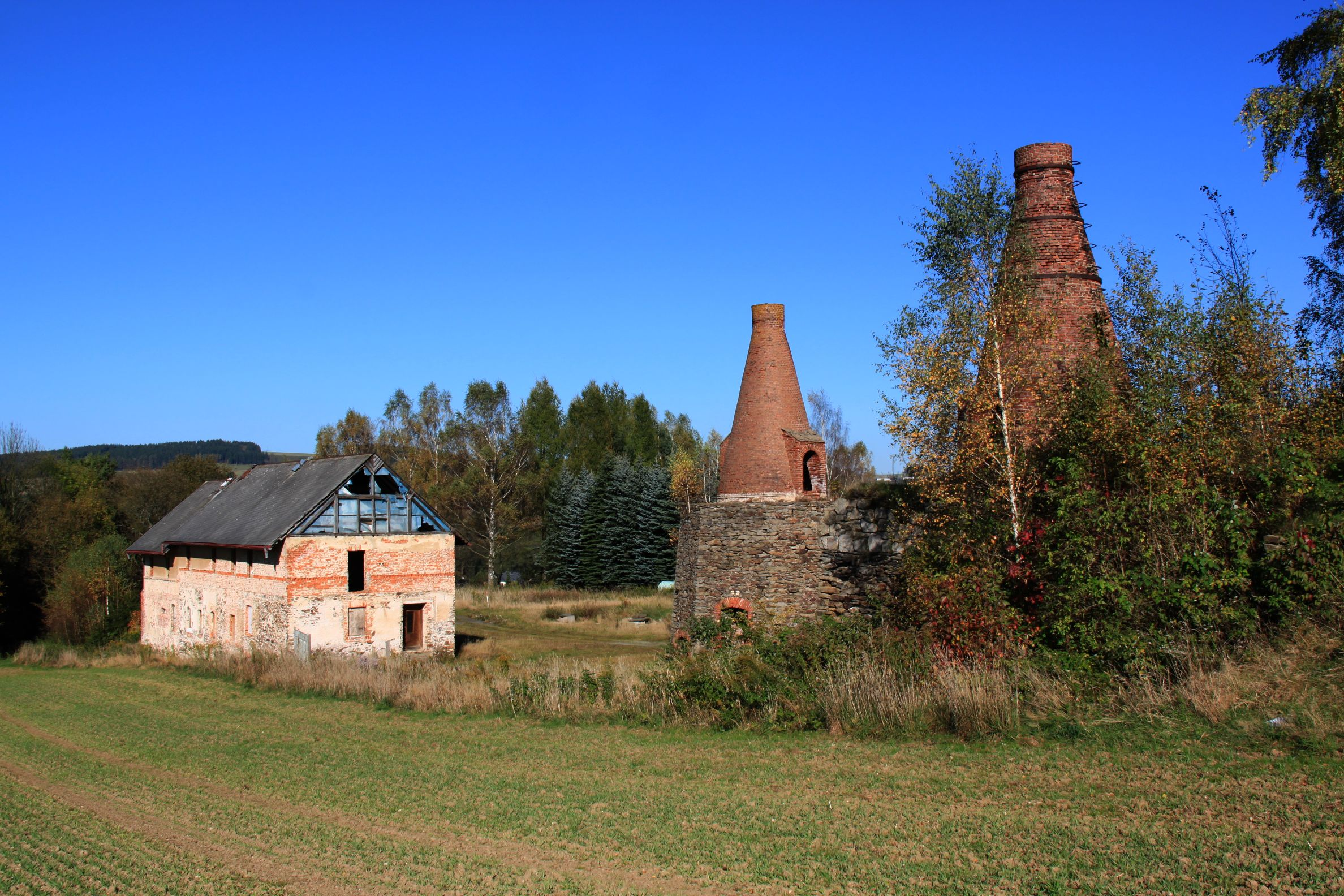
Ruins of the lime plant

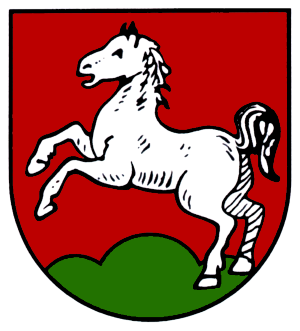

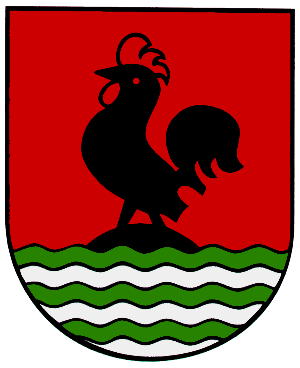

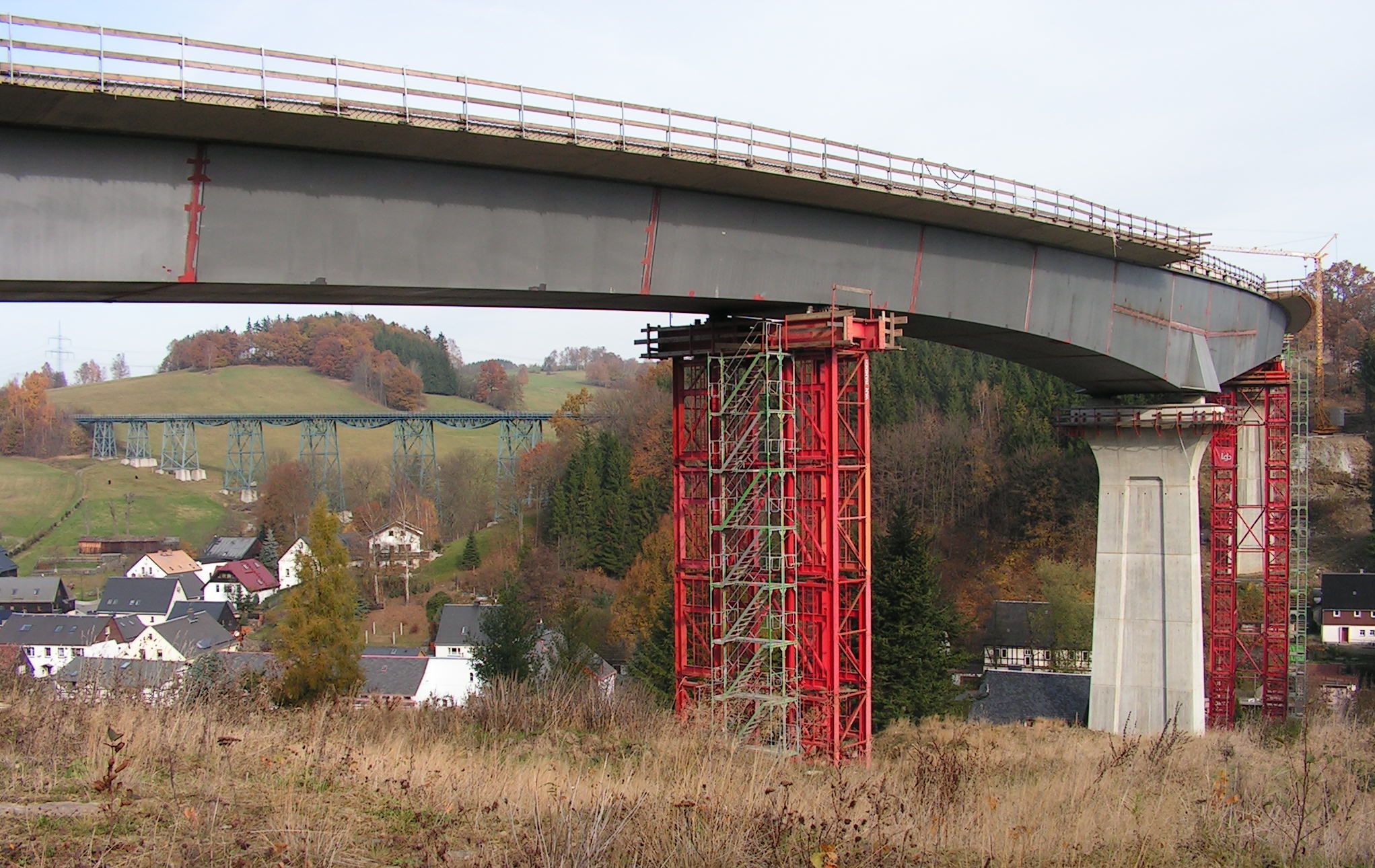
Looking through the bridge under construction of the bypass stream marker (B101) on the marker Bacher Viaduct

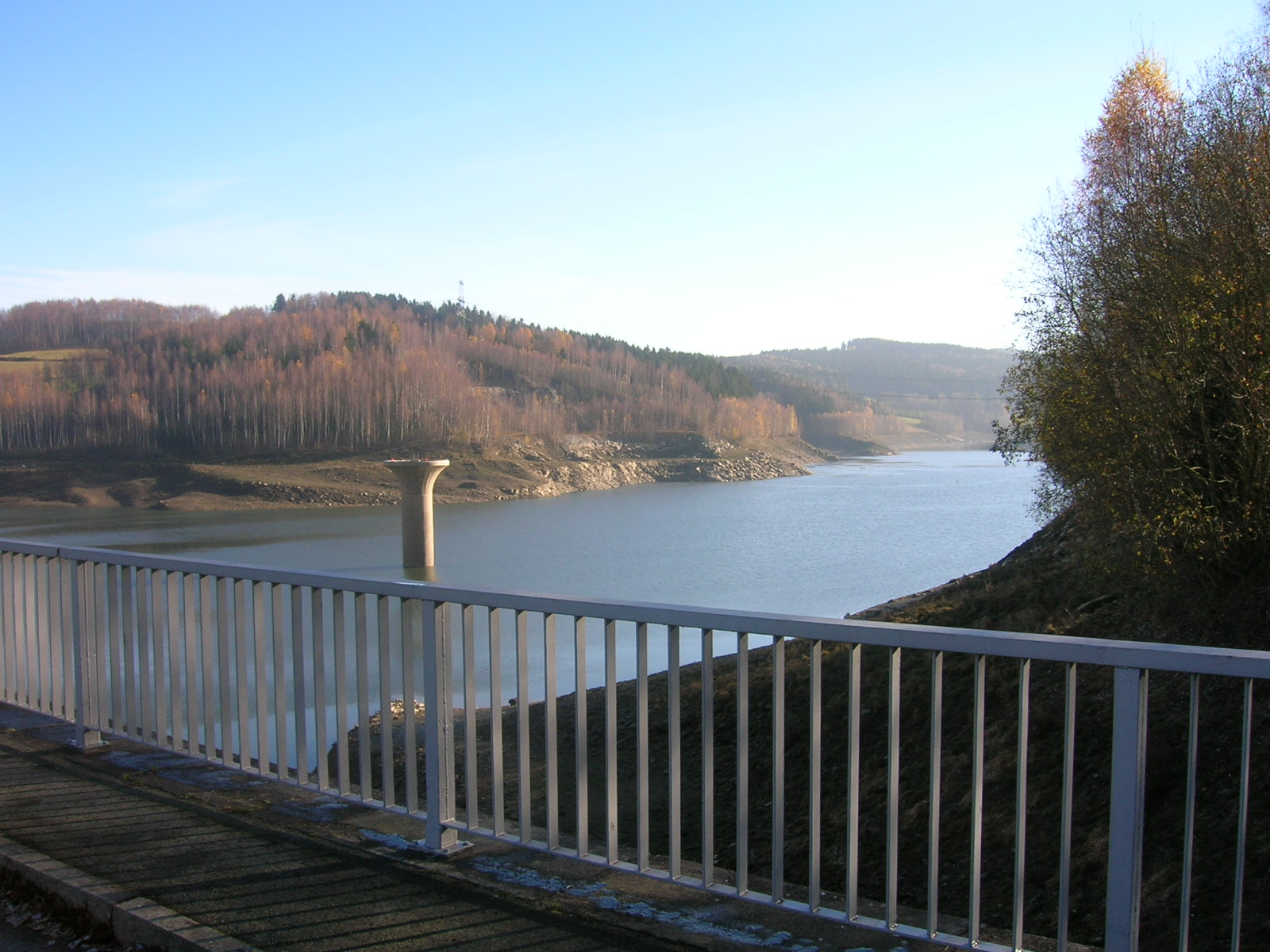
Pumped storage plant markers (Bach Dam)

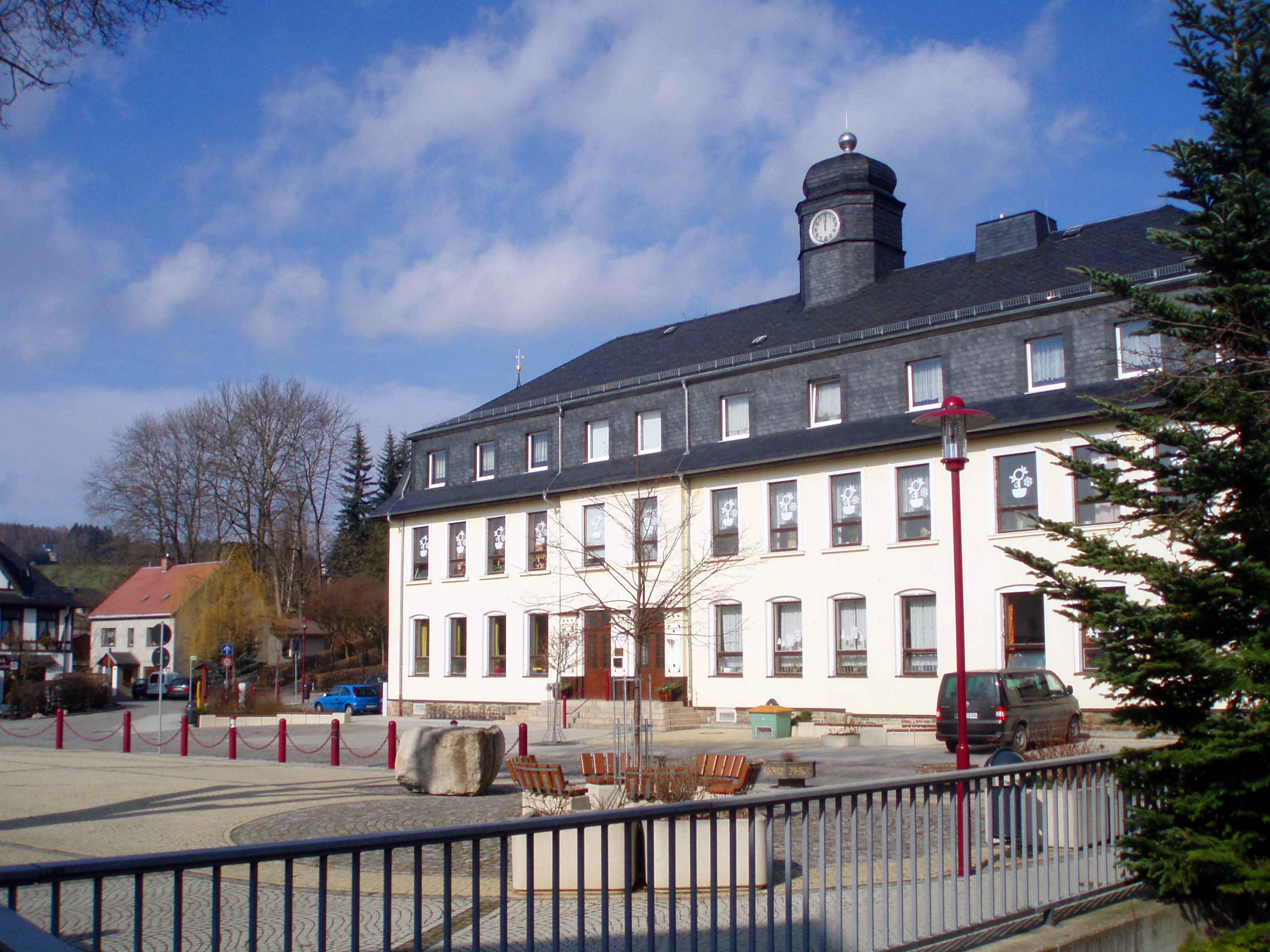
Elementary school

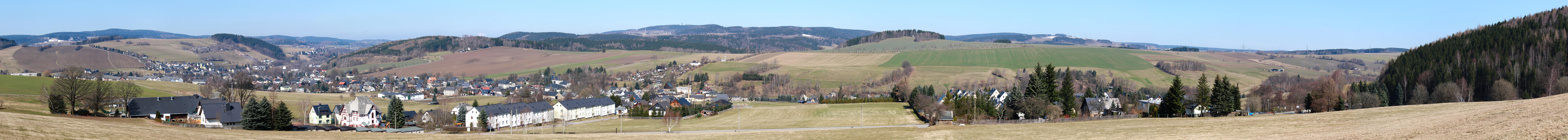

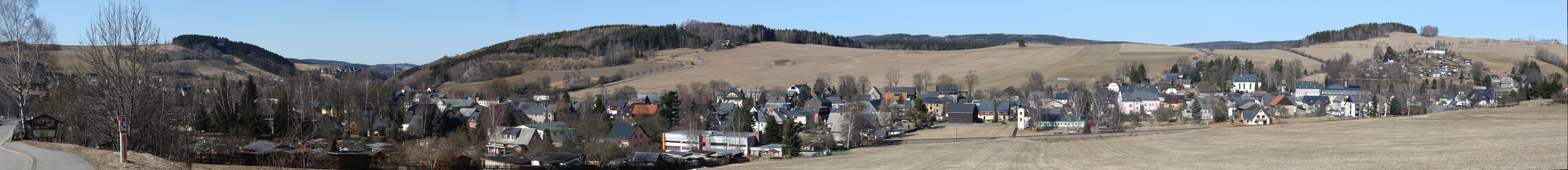

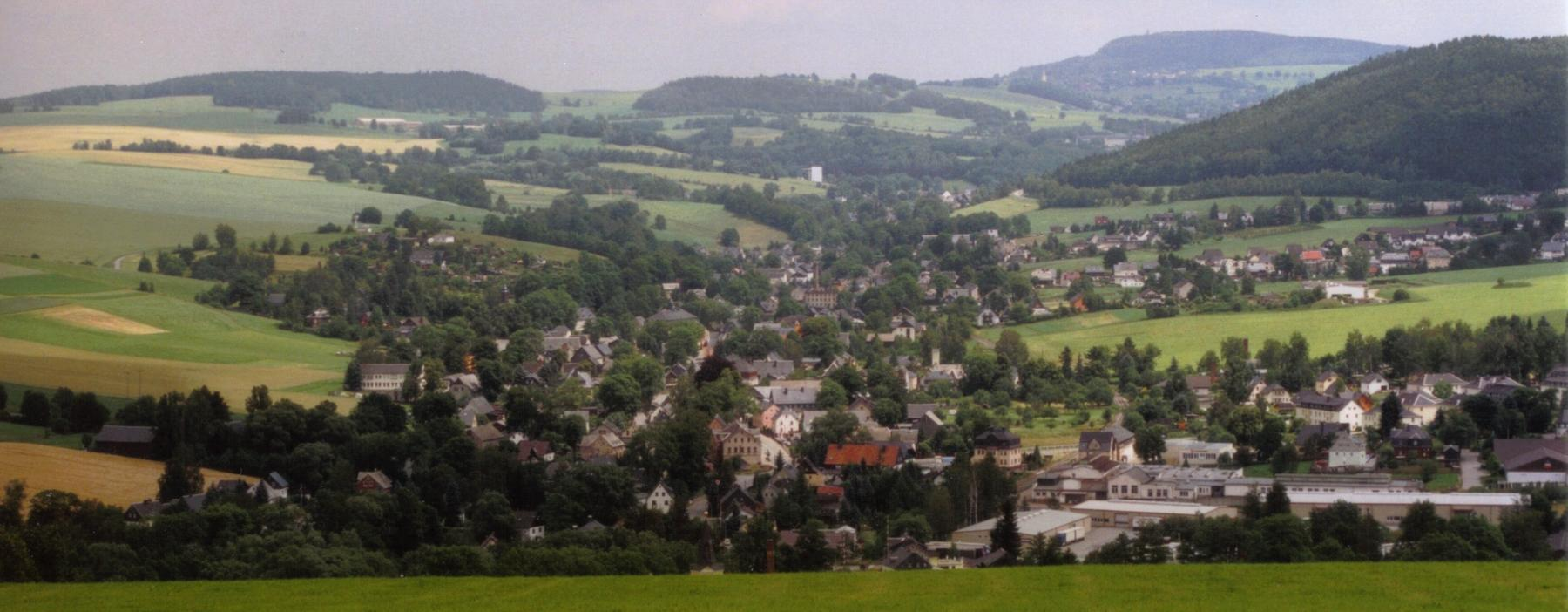
