= Ortrun Enderlein =

Former East German luger

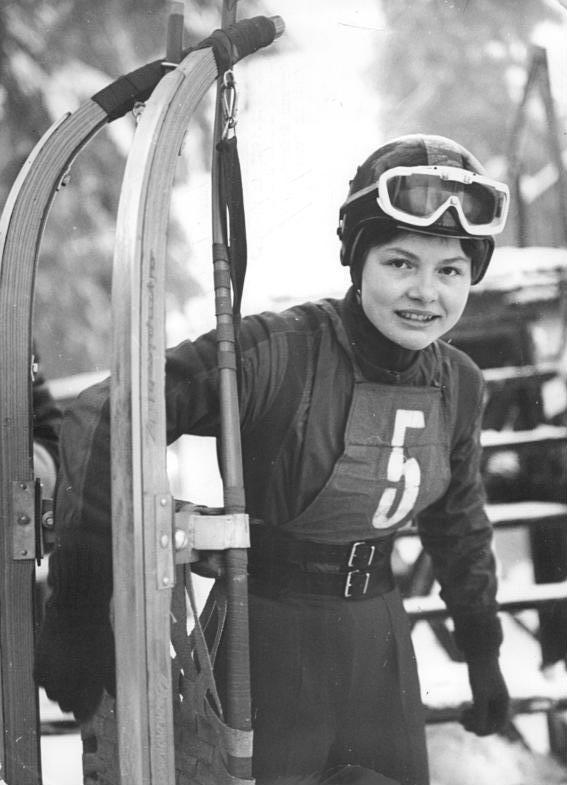
- Ortrun Enderlein at the German Luge Championships, in Oberhof, 14 February 1965

Medal record

Women's luge

Representing Germany

Olympic Games
Gold medal – first place	1964 Innsbruck	Singles

Representing East Germany

Olympic Games
Disqualified	1968 Grenoble	Singles

World Championships
Gold medal – first place	1965 Davos	Singles
Gold medal – first place	1967 Hammarstrand	Singles

Ortrun Zöphel-Enderlein (born 1 December 1943) is a former East German (GDR) luger, and one of the most successful lugers in the 1960s. Enderlein started her working career at the SC Traktor Oberwiesenthal, and was first introduced to luge in her home village of Raschau in the Ore Mountains. In the 1964 Winter Olympic Games in Innsbruck, she became the first female luger to win gold at the Olympics. and won the World Cup in 1965 in Davos and 1967 in Hammarstrand. The athletic achievements of the lugers Thomas Köhler and Enderlein were celebrated and politicised in the GDR during the Cold War when the GDR was not recognised by West Germany, and athletic events in either part of Germany with athletes from both countries were not permitted because of the Hallstein Doctrine.

The controversial disqualification of Enderlein and two other GDR sportswomen at the 1968 Winter Olympic Games in Grenoble, involving the alleged heating of runners before the race start, was believed by GDR officials to be a staged incident against the first official GDR luge team. After her sports career, Enderlein worked as a sales engineer and later presidium member of the Luge and Bobsleigh Association of the GDR and member of the National Olympic Committee of the GDR.

== Personal life and career ==
Ortrun Enderlein was born to forester Willy Enderlein and Hertha, née Müller. Her father came from Hammerunterwiesenthal, part of Oberwiesenthal, and worked mainly in Reichstein, Oberwiesenthal, Mittweida and Trünzig. After World War II, the family relocated to Raschau in the Ore Mountains. Her older brother is motorcyclist Klaus Enderlein.

Enderlein trained as a mechanic in the Volkseigener Betrieb (VEB) Meßgerätewerk Beierfeld, where she was also active. During her sports career she completed a distance learning course in mechanical engineering with a focus on manufacturing engineering. She later worked as a sales engineer in the VEB Meßgerätewerk Beierfeld. She is married to Bernd Zöphel, the former manager of KUKA Werkzeugbau Schwarzenberg GmbH.

== Sports career ==
=== Beginning ===
Enderlein began her sporting career in as a handball player for the eight division BSG Rotation Raschau, sometimes playing as goalkeeper in 1964. She was introduced to luge in 1961 in a section coached by Gotthold Meinhold. The section for luge at SC Traktor Oberwiesenthal was founded in 1962 and included Thomas Köhler, Michael Köhler, Klaus-Michael Bonsack and Ilse Geisler. Enderlein said that her fast breakthrough as a top driver was the result of the team, her coach and her training as a mechanic.

=== Domestic and international competition ===
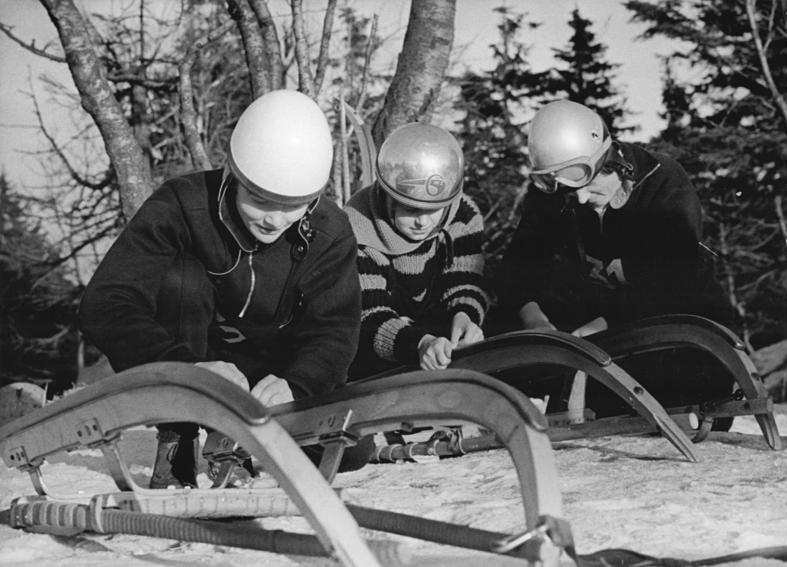
Enderlein (centre), preparing her sleigh before the Fichtelbergrennen (January 1962)

Enderlein competed in five races in the winter of 1961 to 1962 and finished fifth at the German Junior Championships. She debuted at the FIL World Luge Championships 1963 in Imst, but achieved only 24th place after a fall, while her teammate Ilse Geisler won. A few days later, Enderlein finished second behind Geisler, at the international event for the "Ehrenpreis der Stadt Innsbruck" on the newly created Bob-Rodel Igls run in Innsbruck-Igls. Her first major win in a national competition was at the GDR Championships in Oberbärenburg in February 1963; Helga Meusinger, who had previously won at the European Junior Championships in 1961 and 1962 finished second, while Ilse Geisler did not reach the top three because of two falls.

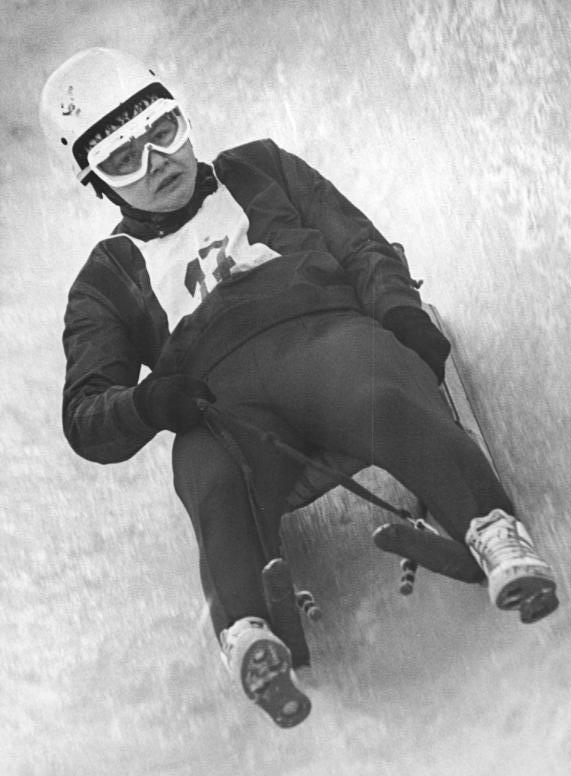
Ortrun Enderlein in 1964

Enderlein debuted and won at the 1964 Winter Olympics in Innsbruck with the best time in all four heats, each on 30, 31 January and 4 February, with a 0.75 second advantage over Ilse Geisler and Austrian Helene Thurner. She set a new record of 50.87 seconds. During the closing ceremony on 9 February 1964, she was awarded the honour of being flag carrier for the United Team of Germany. Enderlein defended her title at the GDR Championships in Friedrichroda on 21 to 22 February 1964 against Ilse Geisler, and defeated Geisler at the Mitropa Cup. In June 1964, together with Thomas Köhler, who was also victorious at the Olympics, Enderlein was awarded the Patriotic Order of Merit in Silver in celebration of the Week of Youth and Sports. The GDR politicised its athletic achievements in its fight for recognition as an independent country and for the right to field its own teams at future Olympic Games. Following that, Enderlein was part of the delegation to the Women's Congress in Berlin from 25 to 27 June 1964.

Enderlein luged at the FIL World Luge Championships 1965 on 6 and 7 February in Davos and won her first World Championship title with an advantage of over one second after four heats, ahead of Petra Tierlich, Ilse Geisler and Barbara Winter. A week later at the 1965 GDR Championships in Oberhof she won with a one-second advantage ahead of Petra Tierlich and Ilse Geisler, despite disqualification in the second heat – only two of the three heats were counted. Because of her consistent achievements, Enderlein was ranked third in the vote for East German Sportswoman of the Year, behind Hannelore Suppe and Gabriele Seyfert. The 1966 Luge Championships on the Spießbergbahn in Friedrichroda was cancelled due to föhn winds and the associated thaw; there were also no national championships that year. Enderlein inaugurated a new open-air public bath in Raschau on 22 June 1966.

Enderlein defended her title at the FIL World Luge Championships 1967 in Hammarstrand, achieving the best time in all four heats on 18 and 19 February and achieved a position 1.39 seconds ahead of Petra Tierlich and Helene Thurner. She also set a new luge record of 50.93 seconds. Because of the Hallstein Doctrine, the East German lugers were not permitted to compete at the FIL European Luge Championships 1967 at Königssee. As this was the only European Luge Championships which took place between 1963 and 1969, Enderlein never participated in any. At the GDR Championships in Oberhof that year she finished second behind Anna-Maria Müller.

=== Controversy ===
Enderlein, who at that time was named the "world's most perfect female luger", won at the January 1968 Alpine Cup Race in Imst as the fastest in the three heats. She was a favourite to win at the 1968 Winter Olympics in Grenoble. After the final third heat on a run in Villard-de-Lans on 11 and 13 February 1968, she was 0.02 seconds ahead of her teammate Anna-Maria Müller, but was disqualified because when Lucjan Świderski, supervisor and vice president of the International Luge Association, tested the runners of the GDR sleighs with snow, the snow allegedly "hissed and vapourised". He concluded that the runners had been illegitimately heated. The second-placed Anna-Maria Müller and the fourth-placed Angela Knösel were also disqualified. Italian Erika Lechner was awarded first place. East German Horst Hörnlein was disqualified for the same reason at the 1967 World Championships, although it was caused by the heating in the tent where he prepared his sleigh for the start, and the runners had not fully cooled.

The allegation of illegitimate heating caused an Olympic scandal, which was especially significant because of the Cold War. While the West German media alleged race fixing, the GDR sports officials under Manfred Ewald blamed the West German Luge Association for staging the incident against the GDR lugers. In the aftermath, the eliminated GDR lugers signed a notarised affidavit in which Enderlein pledged her innocence. According to Stasi documents which came to light in 2006, Świderski had allegedly been bribed by the Federal Republic of Germany and Austria to make the allegation. The question of whether the GDR lugers really cheated remains unresolved, although even the contemporary mainstream media in Germany maintain that the GDR team did not cheat in Grenoble. The president of the Fédération Internationale de Luge de Course, Josef Fendt, refused a revaluation of the incident during his term.

=== Retirement ===
After the Olympic Games in Grenoble, Enderlein took first place in three out of five runs at the GDR Championships in Friedrichroda on 24 and 25 February 1968, ahead of Angela Knösel and Anna-Maria Müller. She was again awarded the Silver Patriotic Order of Merit in August 1968 for her athletic achievements and her "special merits for the increase of the international reputation of the GDR". Enderlein's performance suffered because of a shoulder injury. She finished sixth at the FIL World Luge Championships 1969 at Königssee, although she won the last heat, Petra Tierlich was first. A week before, Enderlein had won the 1969 Luge Alpine Cup in Imst, ahead of Lechner and Knösel. At the 1969 GDR Championships in Friedrichsroda, she finished outside the top three and fully retired from luge. Enderlein was named a "Verdienter Meister des Sports" (Deserved Master of Sport) and was awarded the Artur Becker Medal.

Enderlein was a member of the East German National Olympic Committee from 1970 to 1990, and was awarded the "Ehrenpreis" (Honorary Award) in March 1969 and the "Goldene Ehrennadel" (Golden Honorary Needle) in November 1985. She was also a presidium member of the Luge and Bobsleigh Association of the GDR, and a member of the National Front.
