= Lauter-Bernsbach =

- Municipality
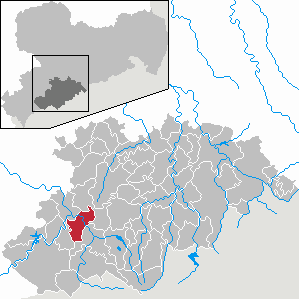
- Location of Lauter-Bernsbach within Erzgebirgskreis district
- Interactive map of Lauter-Bernsbach
- Location within Germany Location within Saxony
- Coordinates: 50°34′N 12°45′E
- Country: Germany
- State: Saxony
- District: Erzgebirgskreis

Area
  - Total: 30.28 km^{2} (11.69 sq mi)

Population (2025-12-31)
  - Total: 8,107
  - Density: 267.7/km^{2} (693.4/sq mi)
- Time zone: UTC+01:00 (CET)
  - Summer (DST): UTC+02:00 (CEST)
- Postal codes: 08312, 08315
- Dialling codes: 03771, 03774
- Vehicle registration: ERZ, ANA, ASZ, AU, MAB, MEK, STL, SZB, ZP

Lauter-Bernsbach (German pronunciation: [ˈlaʊtɐ ˈbɛʁnsbax]) is a town in the Erzgebirgskreis district, in Saxony, Germany. It was formed on 1 January 2013 by the merger of the former town Lauter and municipality Bernsbach.
