= Elterlein =

- Town
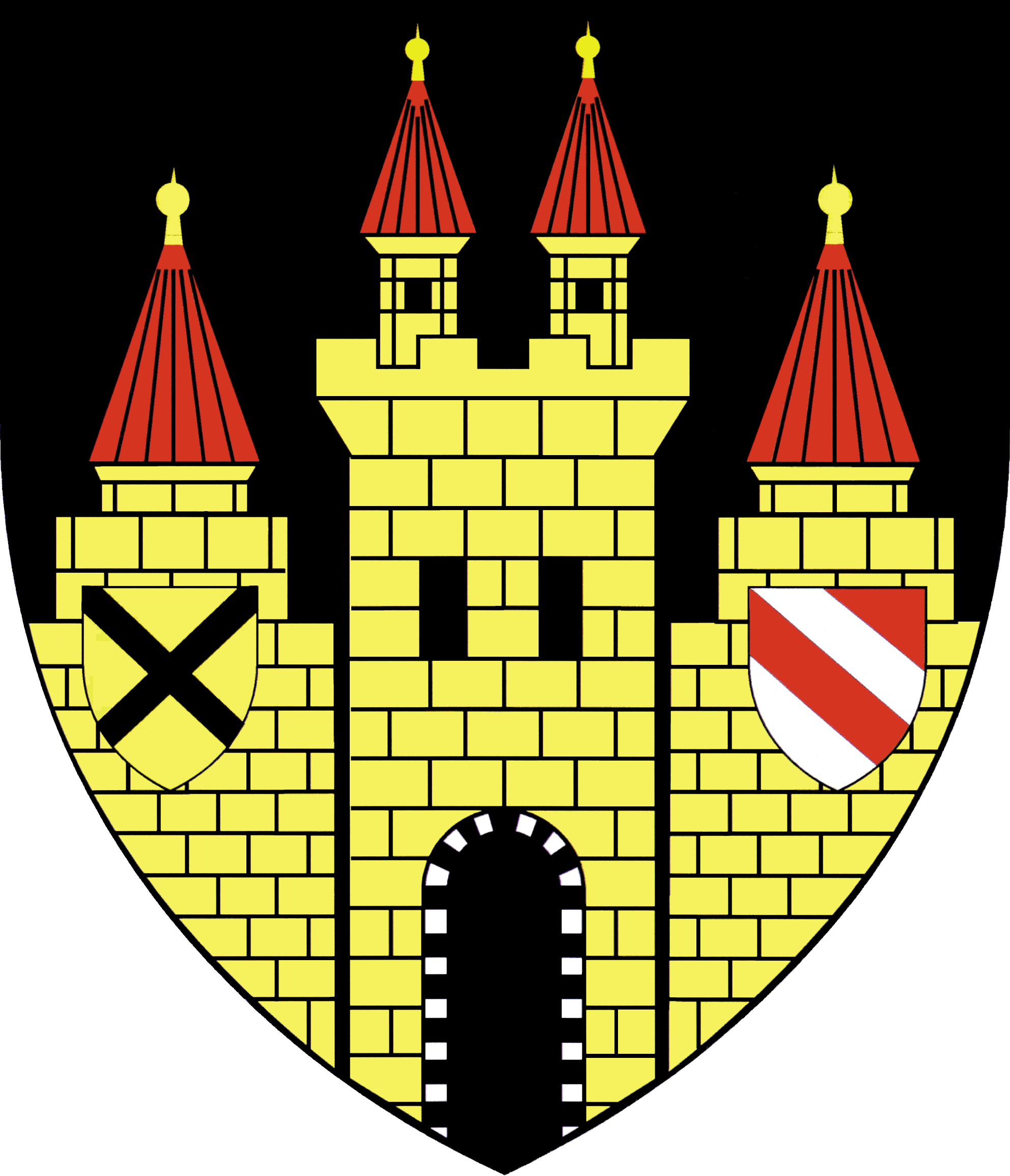
- Coat of arms

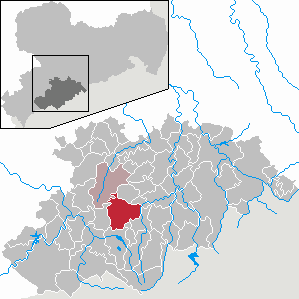
- Location of Elterlein within Erzgebirgskreis district
- Interactive map of Elterlein
- Location within Germany Location within Saxony
- Coordinates: 50°34′37″N 12°52′2″E
- Country: Germany
- State: Saxony
- District: Erzgebirgskreis
- Subdivisions: 3

Government
  - Mayor (2023–30): Annette Ficker

Area
  - Total: 45.74 km^{2} (17.66 sq mi)
- Elevation: 620 m (2,030 ft)

Population (2025-12-31)
  - Total: 2,614
  - Density: 57.15/km^{2} (148.0/sq mi)
- Time zone: UTC+01:00 (CET)
  - Summer (DST): UTC+02:00 (CEST)
- Postal codes: 09481
- Dialling codes: 037349
- Vehicle registration: ERZ, ANA, ASZ, AU, MAB, MEK, STL, SZB, ZP
- Website: www.elterlein-stadt.de

Elterlein (German pronunciation: [ˈɛltɐlaɪ̯n]) is a town in the district of Erzgebirgskreis, in Saxony, Germany. It is situated in the Ore Mountains, 10 km west of Annaberg-Buchholz. It consists of the divisions Elterlein, Hermannsdorf and Schwarzbach.

== History ==
From 1952 to 1990, Elterlein was part of the Bezirk Karl-Marx-Stadt of East Germany.

== Notable people ==
- Wolfgang Uhle (1512–1594), known as the plague priest of Annaberg
