= Scheibenberg =

- Town
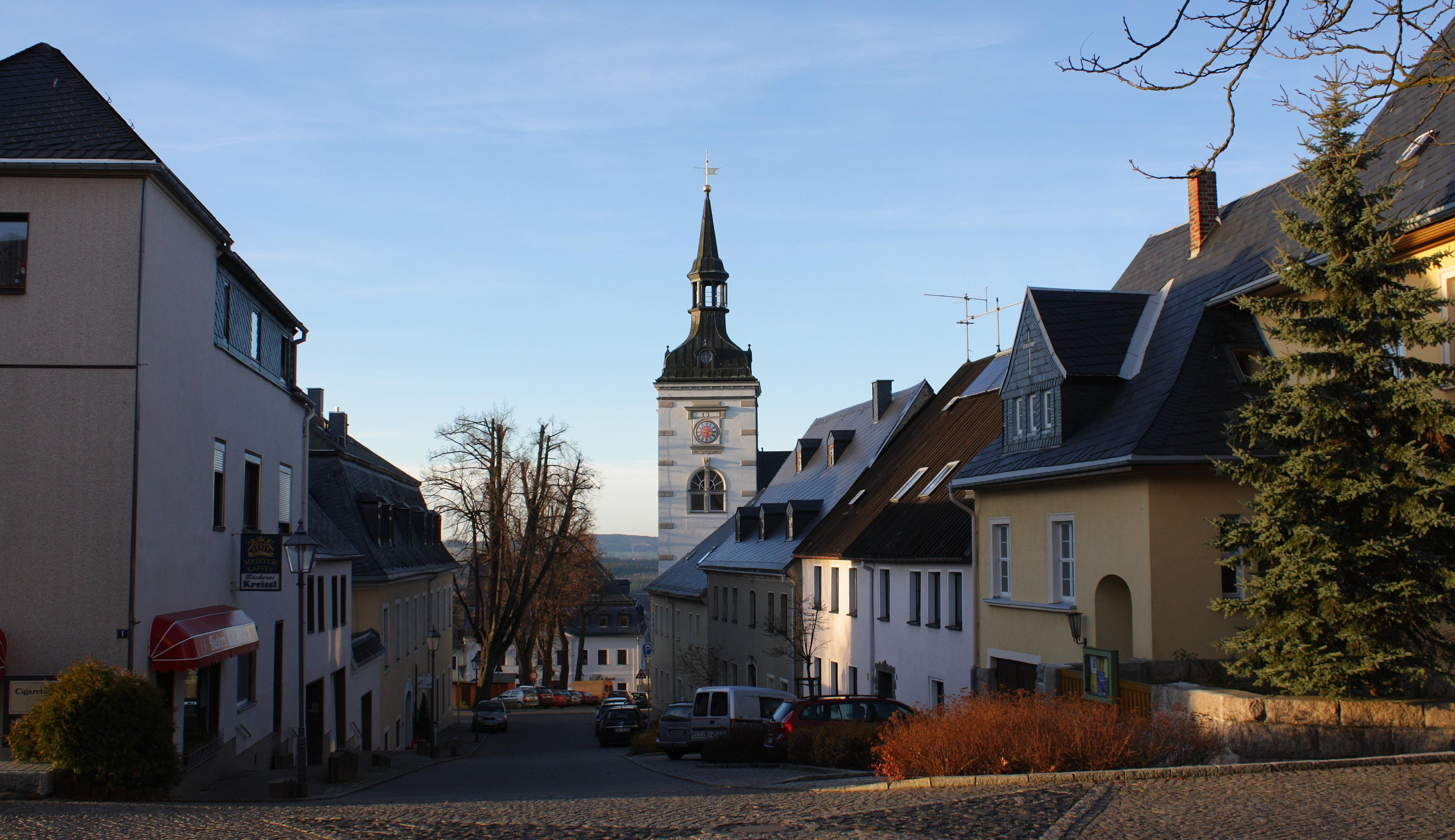
- Scheibenberg. Kirchgasse. View towards marketplace.

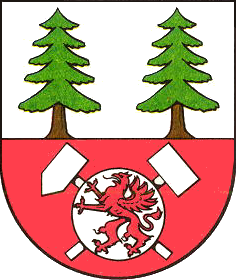
- Coat of arms

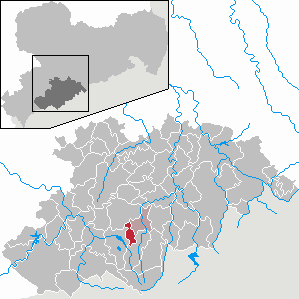
- Location of Scheibenberg within Erzgebirgskreis district
- Interactive map of Scheibenberg
- Location within Germany Location within Saxony
- Coordinates: 50°32′27″N 12°54′45″E
- Country: Germany
- State: Saxony
- District: Erzgebirgskreis

Government
  - Mayor (2022–29): Michael Staib

Area
  - Total: 9 km^{2} (3.5 sq mi)
- Elevation: 600–800 m (2,000–2,600 ft)

Population (2025-12-31)
  - Total: 1,978
  - Density: 220/km^{2} (570/sq mi)
- Time zone: UTC+01:00 (CET)
  - Summer (DST): UTC+02:00 (CEST)
- Postal codes: 09481
- Dialling codes: 037349
- Vehicle registration: ERZ, ANA, ASZ, AU, MAB, MEK, STL, SZB, ZP
- Website: www.scheibenberg.de

Scheibenberg (German pronunciation: [ˈʃaɪbn̩ˌbɛʁk]) is a town in the district of Erzgebirgskreis in Saxony in Germany. It is situated in the Ore Mountains, 8 km southwest of Annaberg-Buchholz, and 9 km east of Schwarzenberg.

== History ==
From 1952 to 1990, Scheibenberg was part of the Bezirk Karl-Marx-Stadt of East Germany.
