= Friedrichroda =

Town in Gotha, Thuringia, Germany

- Town
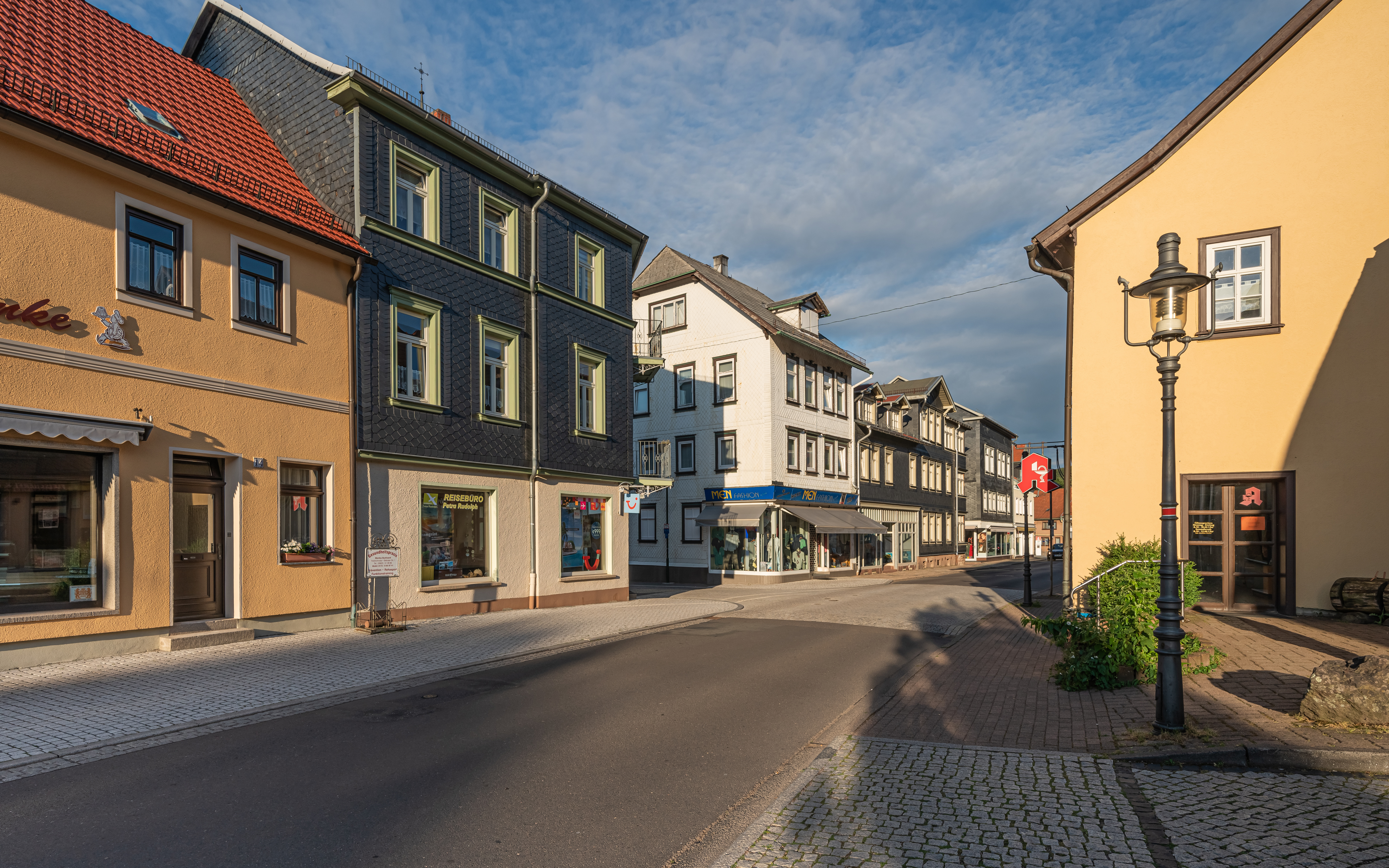
- Market street

- Coat of arms

- Location of Friedrichroda within Gotha district
- Interactive map of Friedrichroda
- Location within Germany Location within Thuringia
- Coordinates: 50°52′N 10°34′E
- Country: Germany
- State: Thuringia
- District: Gotha

Government
  - Mayor (2024–30): Kay Brückmann

Area
  - Total: 36.88 km^{2} (14.24 sq mi)
- Elevation: 430 m (1,410 ft)

Population (2025-12-31)
  - Total: 7,352
  - Density: 199.3/km^{2} (516.3/sq mi)
- Time zone: UTC+01:00 (CET)
  - Summer (DST): UTC+02:00 (CEST)
- Postal codes: 99892–99894
- Dialling codes: 03623
- Vehicle registration: GTH
- Website: www.friedrichroda.de

Friedrichroda (German pronunciation: [fʁiːdʁɪçˈʁoːda]) is a town in the district of Gotha, Thuringia, Germany. It is situated at the north foot of the Thuringian Forest, 21 km by rail southwest of the town of Gotha. It is surrounded by fir-clad hills and possesses numerous handsome villa residences, a Kurhaus and a sanatorium. In the immediate neighborhood is the beautiful ducal hunting seat of Reinhardsbrunn, built out of the ruins of the famous Benedictine monastery founded in 1085. On 1 December 2007, the former municipalities Ernstroda and Finsterbergen were incorporated by Friedrichroda.

== History ==
Within the German Empire (1871–1918), Friedrichroda was part of the Duchy of Saxe-Coburg and Gotha.

== Development of first jet flying wing aircraft ==
During the late years of World War II, Friedrichroda was the site of manufacture of the mock-up production of the double-seat, all-weather fighter version of the Horten Ho 229 V4 and V5 (Versions 4 and 5) flying wing jet aircraft. The only surviving example of the Horten jet is the Horten Ho 229 V3. In December 2011, the Horten V3 was transferred to the Smithsonian Institution's Paul E. Garber Restoration Facility in Suitland, MD.

== Gallery ==
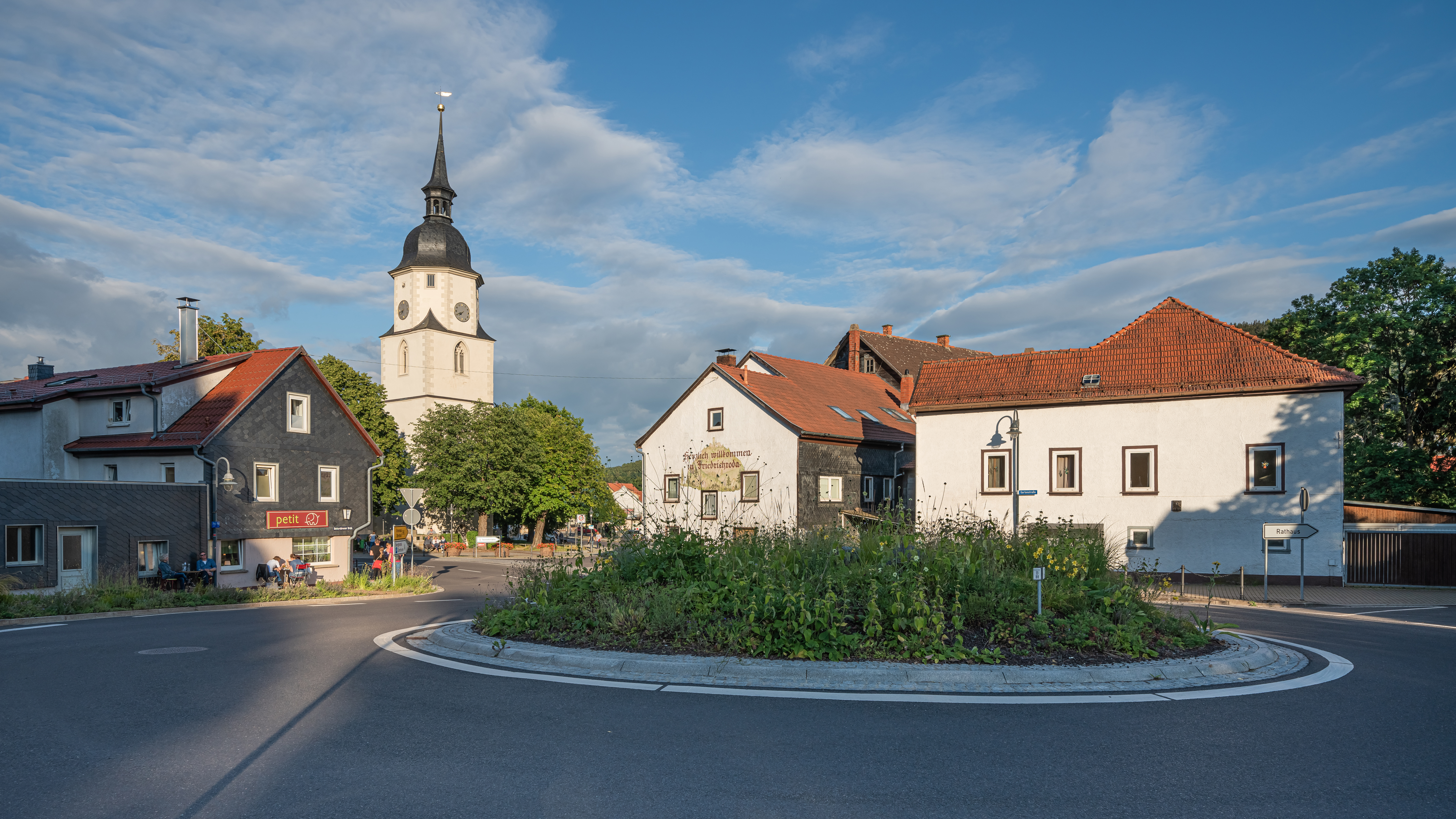
Friedrichroda "Blasius" church

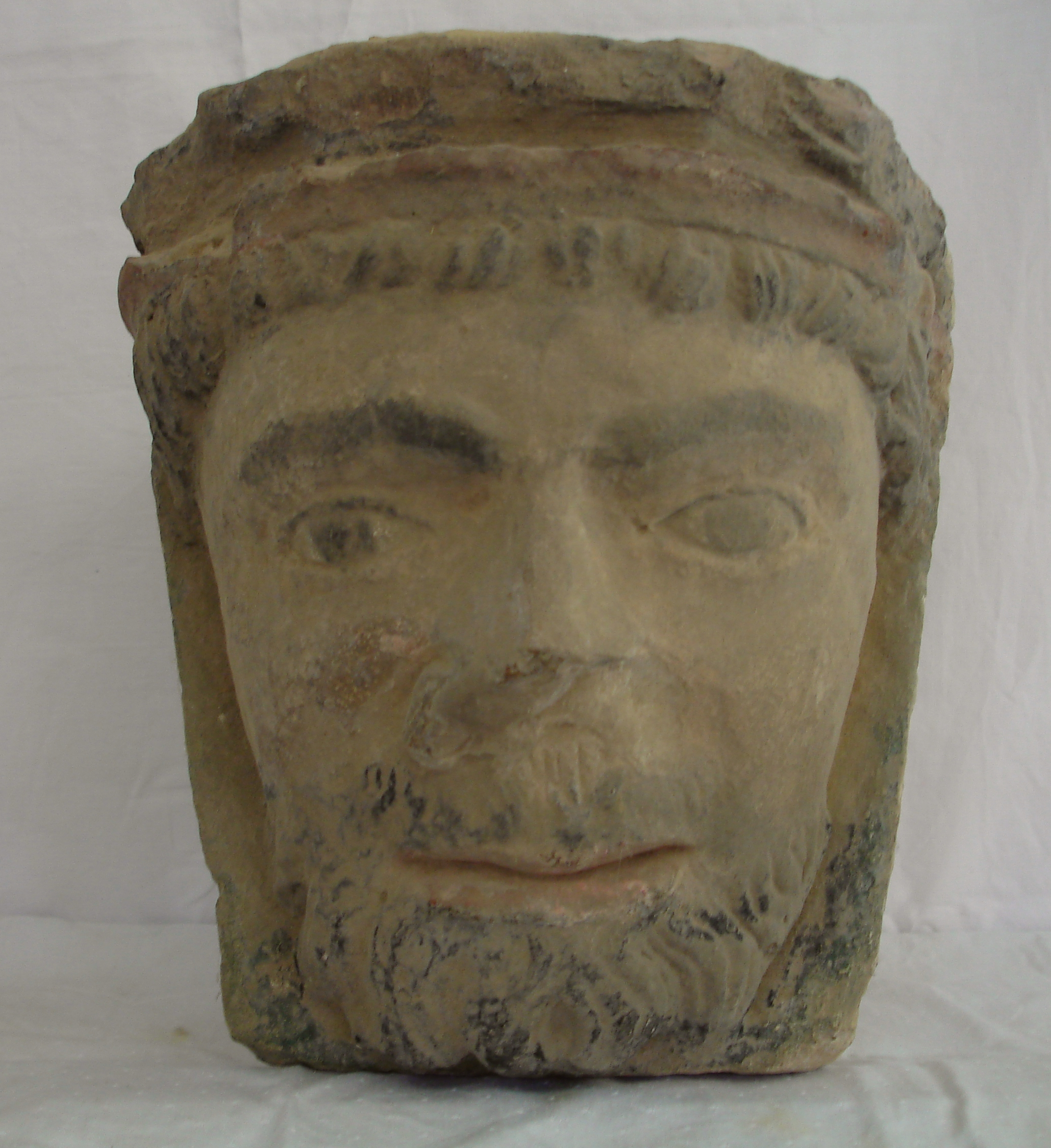
Stone head

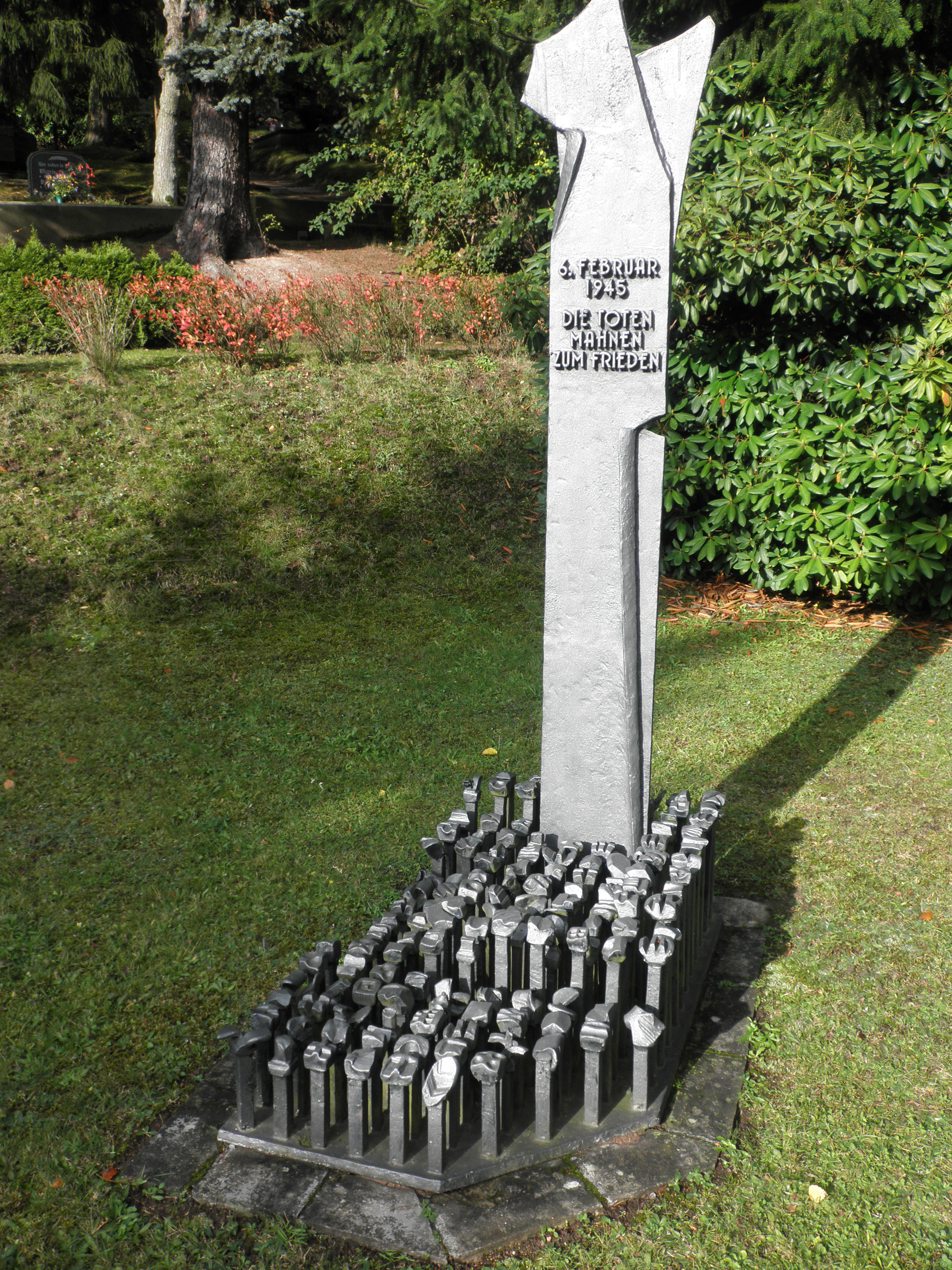
Memorial for victims of an air raid in Friedrichroda

== Notable people ==
- Karsten Albert (born 1968), luger
- Marko Baacke (born 1980), Nordic combiner
- Ilona Brand (born 1958 as Ilona Oeckel), luger
- Christian Friedrich Ludwig Buschmann (1805–1864), musical instrument maker (Terpodion, Harmonium)
- Käte Duncker (1871–1953), politician, women's lawyer, visited the Higher School of Daughters
- Johann Georg Eccarius (1818–1889), worker activist and trade unionist
- Katrin Göring-Eckardt (born 1966 as Katrin Dagmar Eckardt), politician (The Greens) and Vice Bundestag president 2005–2013
- Ralph Gebstedt (born 1971), ski jumper
- Tatjana Hüfner (born 1983), luger, 2010 Olympic champion
- Sandra Hüller (born 1978), actress, grew up in Friedrichroda
- Philipp Klewin (born 1993), footballer
- Helene Lange (1848–1930), teacher and pioneer of women's education
- Max Langenhan (born 1999), luger, 2026 Olympic champion
- Anna-Maria Müller (1949–2009), luger
- Caspar Schmalkalden (1616-1673), traveler
- Auguste Schmidt (1833–1902), teacher and writer
- Melitta Sollmann (born 1958), luger
- Marion Thees (born 1984), skeleton pilot

== See also ==
- Reinhardsbrunn
