= FIL European Luge Championships 1984 =

The FIL European Luge Championships 1984 took place in Olang, Italy for the third time after hosting the event previously in 1975 and 1980.

== Men's singles ==
Medal	Athlete	Time
Gold	Paul Hildgartner (ITA)	
Silver	Norbert Huber (ITA)	
Bronze	Ernst Haspinger (ITA)	

Haspinger earned his third straight bronze medal in this event at the championships.

== Women's singles ==
Medal	Athlete	Time
Gold	Monika Auer (ITA)	
Silver	Heike Popel (GDR)	
Bronze	Cerstin Schmidt (GDR)	

== Men's doubles ==
Medal	Athlete	Time
Gold	Italy (Helmut Brunner, Walter Brunner)	
Silver	West Germany (Hans Stangassinger, Franz Wembacher)	
Bronze	Italy (Hansjörg Raffl, Norbert Huber)	

== Medal table ==
Rank	Nation	Gold	Silver	Bronze	Total
1	Italy (ITA)	3	1	2	6
2	East Germany (GDR)	0	1	1	2
3	West Germany (FRG)	0	1	0	1
Totals (3 entries)		3	3	3	9
