= Miroslav Zajonc =

American luger (born 1960)

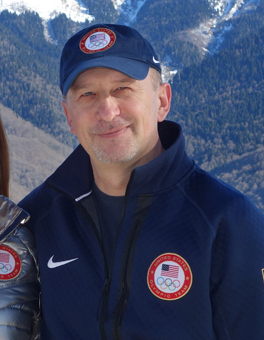
- Zajonc in 2014

Personal information
- Nationality: American
- Born: 10 June 1960 (age 66) Spišská Stará Ves, Czechoslovakia
Medal record
Luge
Representing Canada
World Championships
Gold medal – first place	1983 Lake Placid	Men's singles

Miroslav "Miro" Zajonc (or Zayonc; born 10 June 1960) is an American luger who competed for Czechoslovakia, Canada, and the United States. Competing for Canada, he won the gold medal in the men's singles event at the 1983 FIL World Luge Championships in Lake Placid, New York, in four record breaking runs. He represented the United States at the 1988 Winter Olympics.

== Personal life ==
Zajonc was born on 10 June 1960, in Spišská Stará Ves, Czechoslovakia. He grew up in the Tatra Mountains in the town of Stary Smokovec in Slovakia. In 1995, he changed the spelling of his surname to Zayonc to aid with pronunciation. He became a U.S. citizen in 1986.

== Career ==
=== As a competitor ===
Zajonc started training in luge in 1971 and competed for Czechoslovakia until his defection to the United States in 1981. He was unable to compete for the U.S. until 1985 due to the U.S. luge citizenship qualification policy.

Zajonc was allowed to compete for Canada and he won the World Championships in 1983. He defeated world champion Sergey Danilin (Soviet Union), Olympic champion Paul Hildgartner (Italy), and 1980 Olympic champion Bernhard Glass (Germany). Although Zajonc lacked a large support staff like the dominant German, Italian, and Soviet teams, the Italian luger Hansjörg Raffl gave him one of his new speed suits just before the competition to help him be competitive with the best teams. His victory created problems for the Soviet coaching staff as he defeated Danilin on a Soviet-built sled purchased from them just months prior to the race.

Despite sliding his best at the time, Zajonc was unable to compete at the 1984 Winter Olympics in Sarajevo, due to not having US citizenship. After 1985, he represented the United States and was named in the U.S. team to the 1988 Winter Olympics in Calgary. He qualified despite breaking his right foot in a training accident five weeks prior to the Olympics. Zajonc suffered an open fracture and was missing part of his heal bone after hitting his foot at 65 mph 2×6 wall extension that was left square with the bottom of his foot. His injury prevented him from competing in singles and he would finish 11th in the men's doubles event for the US team, sliding with a special cast on his right foot. He used crutches to get to the start. The East German team requested to inspect Zayonc's injury, thinking he might be faking it to gain a competitive advantage using the pointed cast. He retired from competition in 1988.

=== As a coach ===
Zajonc joined the USA luge team's coaching staff in 1990. He served as head coach of the junior national team from 1991–2011. His athletes won 15 World Championship titles and many overall World Cup victories. He also coached the US Olympic luge teams in 1992, 1994, 1998, 2002, 2006, 2010 and 2014, winning five Olympic medals. In September 2012, Zayonc was named U.S. senior national head coach heading for Sochi. At the Olympics, Erin Hamlin won a bronze medal, the first-ever US Olympic medal in singles luge.

In May 2017, Zajonc stepped down as head coach due to Parkinson's disease. USA Luge CEO Jim Leahy stated that Zayonc would remain active in the organization.
