= Leina (river) =

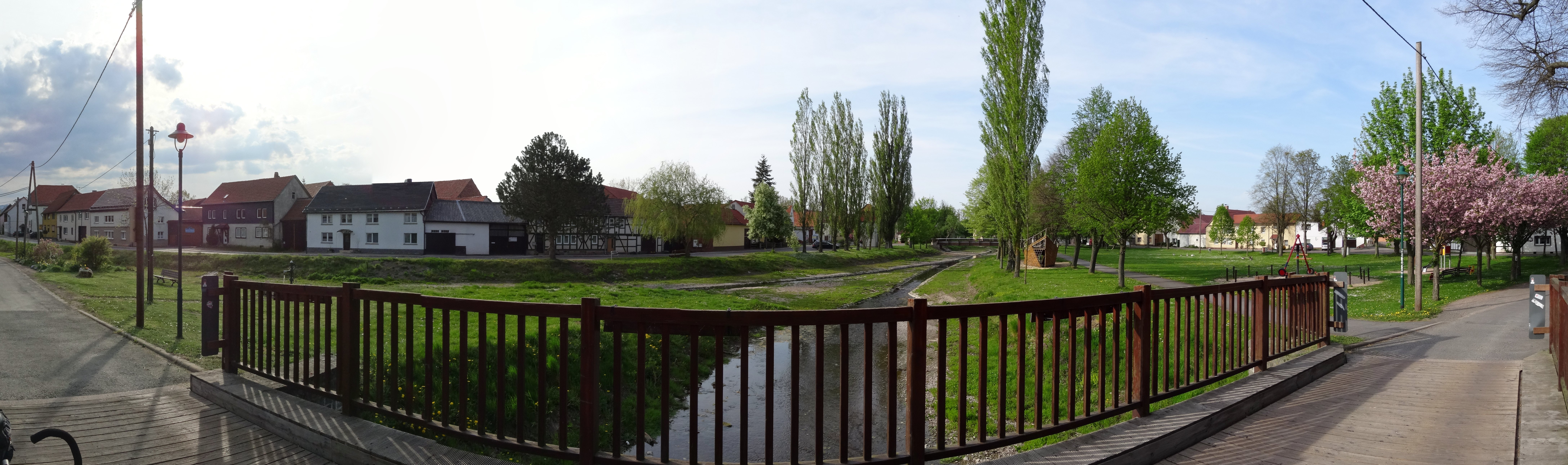

Location
- Country: Germany
- State: Thuringia

Physical characteristics
- Mouth
  - location: Hörsel
  - coordinates: 50°54′9″N 10°37′54″E

Basin features
- Progression: Hörsel→ Werra→ Weser→ North Sea

Leina (German pronunciation: [ˈlaɪna]) is a river of Thuringia, Germany. It flows into the Hörsel in the village Leina.

== Description ==
The Leina river has its source at Leinaborn in the Thuringian Forest. After about 2.5 kilometres the course of the stream is dammed by the Brandleiteteich pond - an early modern mining and smelting complex was located here in the 15th century .

Further tributaries in the Finsterbergen meadow significantly strengthen the stream. Therefore in the Leinengrund area, there were about five sawmills and hammer mills over a distance of four kilometres. A weir created in the 14'th century diverts most of its water into the Leina Canal. The Leina itself flows as Wilde Leina (also known as Kleine Leina) in its original river bed as far as Schönau vor dem Walde, a short distance from the Leina Canal. At the confluence with the Altenwasser in the village of Leina, the Wilde Leina becomes the Hörsel.

== Tributaries ==
The following river are tributaries of the Leina.

| Name | Zufluss- seite | Länge [km] | Einzugs- gebiet [km²] | Mündungs- höhe [m. ü. NN] | Mündungs- ort (*: bei) | DGKZ |
|---|---|---|---|---|---|---|
| Großer Frosch | left | 2,1 | | 514 | | 416-11? |
| Rösenbach | left | 2,1 | | 458 | oberh. Finsterbergens | 416-11? |
| Körnsbergwasser | left | 2,9 | 3,1 | 440 | unterh. Finsterbergens | 416-11? |
| Sulzbach | right | 1,8 | | 390 | Engelsbach von Catterfeld | 416-11? |
| Schilfwasser | left | 11,2 | 14,3 | 338 | Ernstroda* | 416-12 |
| Cumbach | left | 3,9 | 7,3 | 326 | Cumbach* | 416-1? |
| Altenwasser | right | 7,3 | 8,5 | 317 | Leina | 416-1? |

== See also ==
- List of rivers of Thuringia
