= Handrich =

Handrich is a surname of German origin. Notable people with the surname include:

- Alvin A. Handrich (1892–1981), American farmer, businessman, and politician
- Melvin O. Handrich (1919–1950), American World War II and Korean War veteran
- Uwe Handrich (born 1959), East German luger
- Dia Handrich also known as Dia Mirza, a German-Indian actress
