= Hans Einn =

German luger

Medal record

Luge

European Championships
Silver medal – second place	1982 Winterberg	Men's doubles

Hans Einn was an East German luger who competed in the early 1980s. He won the silver medal in the men's doubles event at the 1982 FIL European Luge Championships in Winterberg, West Germany.
