= Monika Auer =

Italian luger

Medal record

Luge

European Championships
Gold medal – first place	1984 Olang	Women's singles

Monika Auer (born 21 April 1957 in Welschnofen) is an Italian luger who competed from the late 1970s to the mid-1980s. She is best known for the second-place overall Luge World Cup finish in women's singles in 1980-1.

Competing in two Winter Olympics, Auer earned her best finish of 13th in the women's singles event at Sarajevo in 1984. She won the gold medal in the women's singles event in the 1984 FIL European Luge Championships in Olang, Italy.
