= Heike Popel =

German luger

Medal record

Luge

European Championships
Silver medal – second place	1984 Olang	Women's singles

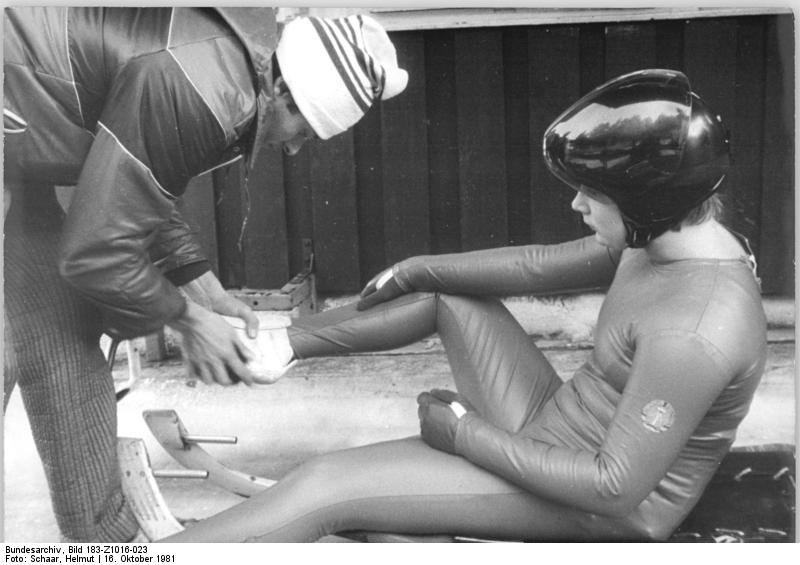
Popel preparing for start at a 1981 race

Heike Popel was an East German luger who competed during the 1980s. She won the silver medal in the women's singles event 1984 FIL European Luge Championships in Olang, Italy.
