= Helmut Brunner =

Helmut Brunner may refer to:

- Helmut Brunner (luger)
- Helmut Brunner (politician)
