= FIL European Luge Championships 1980 =

The FIL European Luge Championships 1980 took place in Olang, Italy for the second time after previously hosting the event in 1975. It also marked the last time the championships would be hosted in consecutive years, a tradition started in 1970. Beginning at these championships, the event would be hosted in even-numbered years, a tradition that continued until 2012.

== Men's singles ==
Medal	Athlete	Time
Gold	Karl Brunner (ITA)	
Silver	Paul Hildgartner (ITA)	
Bronze	Ernst Haspinger (ITA)	

The Italians sweep the medals in this event after the East Germans did it the previous year.

== Women's singles ==
Medal	Athlete	Time
Gold	Melitta Sollmann (GDR)	
Silver	Marie-Luise Rainer (ITA)	
Bronze	Ilona Brand (GDR)	

== Men's doubles ==
Medal	Athlete	Time
Gold	East Germany (Hans Rinn, Norbert Hahn)	
Silver	East Germany (Bernd Hahn, Ulrich Hahn)	
Bronze	West Germany (Hans Brandner, Balthasar Schwarm)	

== Medal table ==
Rank	Nation	Gold	Silver	Bronze	Total
1	East Germany (GDR)	2	1	1	4
2	Italy (ITA)	1	2	1	4
3	West Germany (FRG)	0	0	1	1
Totals (3 entries)		3	3	3	9
