= Sollman =

Sollman or Sollmann is a surname of German origin. Notable people with the surname include:

- Janeen Sollman, American politician
- Melitta Sollmann (born 1958), East German luger
- Scott Sollmann, American attorney and former Notre Dame football & baseball player
- Wilhelm Sollmann (1881-1951), German politician
