= Bernd Oberhoffner =

East German luger

Medal record

Luge

World Championships
Silver medal – second place	1981 Hammarstrand	Men's doubles

European Championships
Gold medal – first place	1979 Oberhof	Men's doubles

Bernd Oberhoffner was an East German luger who competed in the early 1980s. He won the silver medal in the men's doubles event at the 1981 FIL World Luge Championships in Hammarstrand, Sweden.

Oberhoffner also won a gold medal in the men's doubles event at the 1979 FIL European Luge Championships in Oberhof, East Germany.

Oberhoffner also worked as a stuntman for winter sports, working on many films, including the ski sequences in the James Bond film For Your Eyes Only.
