= Hans Stangassinger =

German luger (born 1960)

Medal record

Men's luge

Representing West Germany

Olympic Games
Gold medal – first place	1984 Sarajevo	Men's doubles

World Championships
Bronze medal – third place	1981 Hammarstrand	Men's doubles
Bronze medal – third place	1983 Lake Placid	Men's doubles

World Cup Championships
Silver medal – second place	1982-83	Men's doubles
Bronze medal – third place	1980-81	Men's doubles

European Championships
Silver medal – second place	1984 Olang	Men's doubles
Bronze medal – third place	1982 Winterberg	Men's doubles

Hans Stangassinger (born 5 January 1960 in Berchtesgaden, Bavaria) was a West German luger who competed in the early 1980s. He won the gold medal in the men's doubles event at the 1984 Winter Olympics in Sarajevo.

Stangassinger also won two bronze medals in the men's doubles event at the FIL World Luge Championships (1981, 1983). At the FIL European Luge Championships, he also won two medals in the men's doubles event with a silver in 1984 and a bronze in 1982.

Stangassinger's best overall Luge World Cup finish was second in men's doubles in 1982-3.
