= FIL World Luge Championships 1981 =

The FIL World Luge Championships 1981 took place in Hammarstrand, Sweden for the third time. Hammarstrand had hosted the event previously in 1967 and 1975. It also marked the last time the event took place on a natural track until 2000 with events now moving to the FIL World Luge Natural Track Championships which debuted in 1979.

== Men's singles ==
Medal	Athlete	Time
Gold	Sergey Danilin (URS)	
Silver	Michael Walter (GDR)	
Bronze	Ernst Haspinger (ITA)	

== Women's singles ==
Medal	Athlete	Time
Gold	Melitta Sollmann (GDR)	
Silver	Cerstin Schmidt (GDR)	
Bronze	Vera Zozula (URS)	

== Men's doubles ==
Medal	Athlete	Time
Gold	East Germany (Bernd Hahn, Ulrich Hahn)	
Silver	East Germany (Bernd Oberhoffner, Jörg-Dieter Ludwig)	
Bronze	West Germany (Hans Stangassinger, Franz Wembacher)	

== Medal table ==
Rank	Nation	Gold	Silver	Bronze	Total
1	East Germany (GDR)	2	3	0	5
2	Soviet Union (URS)	1	0	1	2
3	Italy (ITA)	0	0	1	1
3	West Germany (FRG)	0	0	1	1
Totals (4 entries)		3	3	3	9
