= Caspar Schmalkalden =

17th-century German traveler

Caspar Schmalkalden (c. 1616 – 1673) was a German traveler who journeyed through South America and Asia as a soldier in Dutch service. After returning in 1652, Schmalkalden wrote a travelogue comprising nearly 500 handwritten pages, recording geographical, ethnological, and biological observations of the flora and fauna of the regions he visited. Although the exact background of his travels remains unknown, Schmalkalden's report is one of several similar 17th-century travelogues. While it revealed no new discoveries from a European perspective, his notes remain a valuable addition to contemporary historical sources.

== Life ==
=== Origin ===
Caspar Schmalkalden's exact year of birth is unknown. When he joined the Dutch army, he was about twenty-five years old, suggesting he was born around 1617 or shortly before. His father, Liborius Schmalkalden, was mayor of the small town of Friedrichroda on the edge of the Thuringian Forest. The earliest surviving register of souls from the Protestant parish of St. Blasius in Friedrichroda, dating from 1632, contains the first mention of Caspar. The register also lists his mother, Magdalena Schmalkalden, and his siblings: two brothers, Christophorus and Liborius, and four sisters, Anna, Dorothea, Martha, and Susanna.

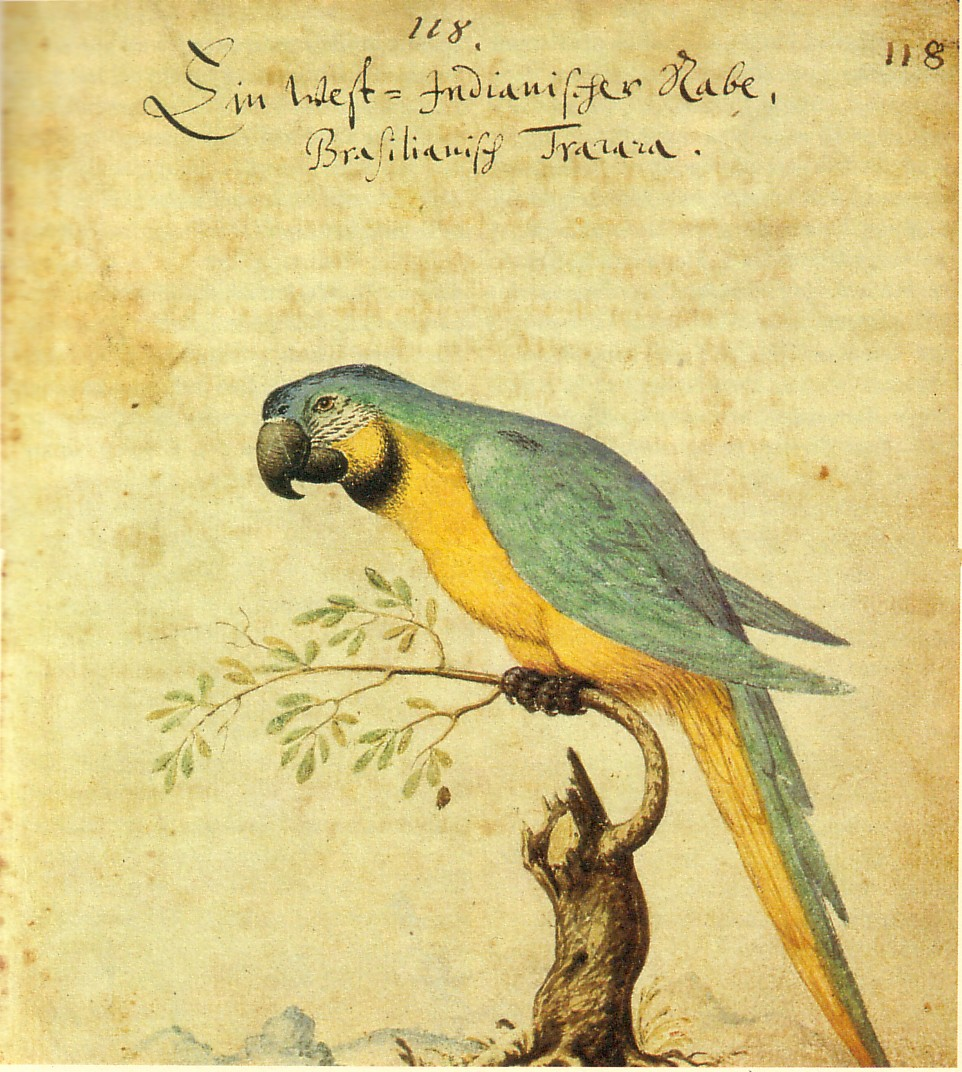
A West Indian raven, Brazilian Tracaca (Araraura)

=== First voyage: Brazil and Chile (1642–1645) ===
==== Crossing to Brazil ====
It is not known how Caspar Schmalkalden came to serve as a soldier in the Dutch West India Company. To advance their overseas expansion, the Dutch relied on sailors, soldiers, surgeons, and other skilled workers from other countries. Schmalkalden mentions a comrade from Scotland and a commander from Courland on his first voyage.

On 16 October 1642, Schmalkalden boarded the merchant ship Elephant on the island of Texel with 36 other soldiers and four women. At that time, Texel was a key starting point for shipping routes to the Dutch colonies. The ship set sail on 4 November. The fleet, originally consisting of 97 ships, gradually separated, with only three setting course for Brazil. Two days after crossing the equator on 6 December, the travellers sighted the island of Fernando de Noronha and reached the mainland on 11 December. The next day, Schmalkalden and the other soldiers went ashore in Pernambuco.

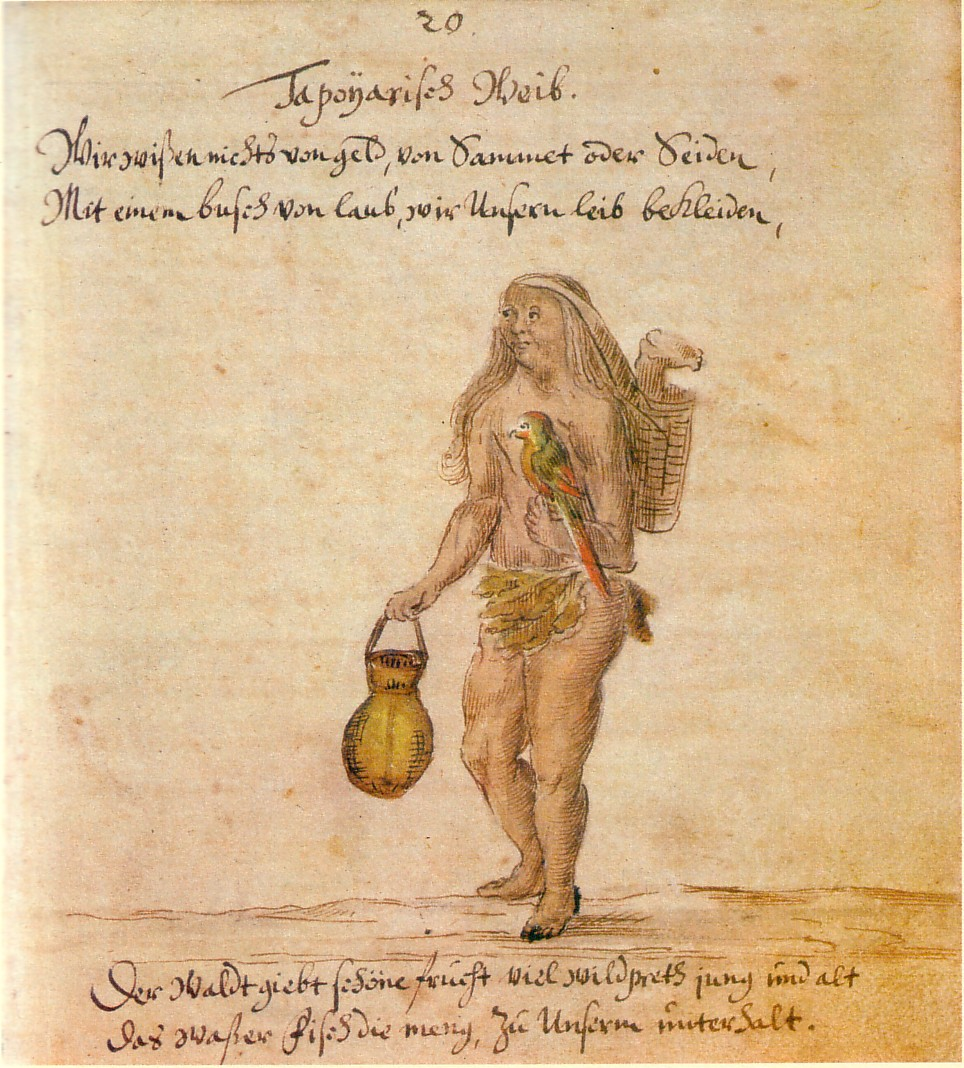
Tapuya woman

==== Stay in Dutch Brazil and expedition to Chile ====
The colony of New Holland (or Dutch Brazil) was founded in 1630 by the Dutch West India Company. In July 1642, the Dutch signed a ten-year truce with Portugal, halting fighting in the region but limiting Dutch expansion in Brazil. Seeking new opportunities in the southwest of the continent, the experienced admiral Hendrik Brouwer was sent to Chile to negotiate secret trade agreements. He set sail on 12 January 1643 with a fleet of five ships, including the vice-admiral's ship, the Vlyssingen, on which Caspar Schmalkalden served.

After rounding Cape Horn, the fleet sighted Chile on 28 April and landed on Chiloé on 10 May. On 20 May, an armed conflict broke out with the Spanish. Dutch negotiators secured an alliance with local inhabitants against the Spanish. However, after Admiral Hendrik Brouwer's death on 7 August and a threatened mutiny by Dutch soldiers in mid-October due to dwindling rations, the new admiral, Elias Herckmans, decided to return to Brazil, a journey lasting from 28 October to 29 December 1643.

During Schmalkalden's stay in Chile, tensions grew between Governor Johann Moritz von Nassau-Siegen and the West India Company in Dutch Brazil. In May 1644, Johann Moritz left Brazil, marking the beginning of the colony's decline as the Portuguese mobilized to recapture it.

==== Return journey ====
Caspar Schmalkalden set sail from Recife on 27 May 1645 aboard the ship Groningen to return to Europe. However, on 17 June, while the fleet was anchored off Paraíba, news arrived that Cape St. Augustine (approximately 30 km south of Recife) had been surrendered to the Portuguese. Consequently, Schmalkalden and other soldiers returned to shore and stayed at Fort Margaretha temporarily. The ship Morian was sent ahead to the Netherlands, and the assistant preacher of the Groningen, Johannes Hasselbeck, travelled with it, appointing Schmalkalden as administrator of his property left on the Groningen. The fleet remained in Paraíba until early July, when orders arrived to sail to Recife on 4 July. Due to northward ocean currents, this proved impossible, and the fleet instead headed to the fortress of Ceulenburg in the province of Rio Grande do Norte. On 6 August, news arrived by land from Recife, permitting the fleet to sail for the Netherlands.

On 7 August, the ships set sail. Four days later, Schmalkalden crossed the equator for the second time. At the end of August or early September, he crossed the Sargasso Sea, which he called the "Gruß-See" (Greeting Sea), describing the characteristic seaweed he referred to as Gruß (greeting).

The crossing was eventful. Schmalkalden reported a soldier's death on the night of 4 September, and on 9 September, he wrote:

The night before, almost all of our ship's officers had drunk themselves silly, causing great commotion, shame, abuse, and quarrelling on the ship, which ended in a brawl that lasted until morning. The guilty ones were locked in the forecastle, and the others went to rest.

Unfavourable winds in the English Channel forced the ship to anchor near Newport on the Isle of Wight for nearly four weeks (13 October to 8 November). As the voyage resumed, the ship ran aground on a sandbank while leaving the harbour, taking half an hour to free itself. On 13 November, after more than three years away, Schmalkalden reached the city of Groningen and traveled overland to Amsterdam, arriving on 23 November.

=== Second voyage: Java, Taiwan, and Japan (1646–1652) ===
==== Crossing and stay at the Cape of Good Hope ====
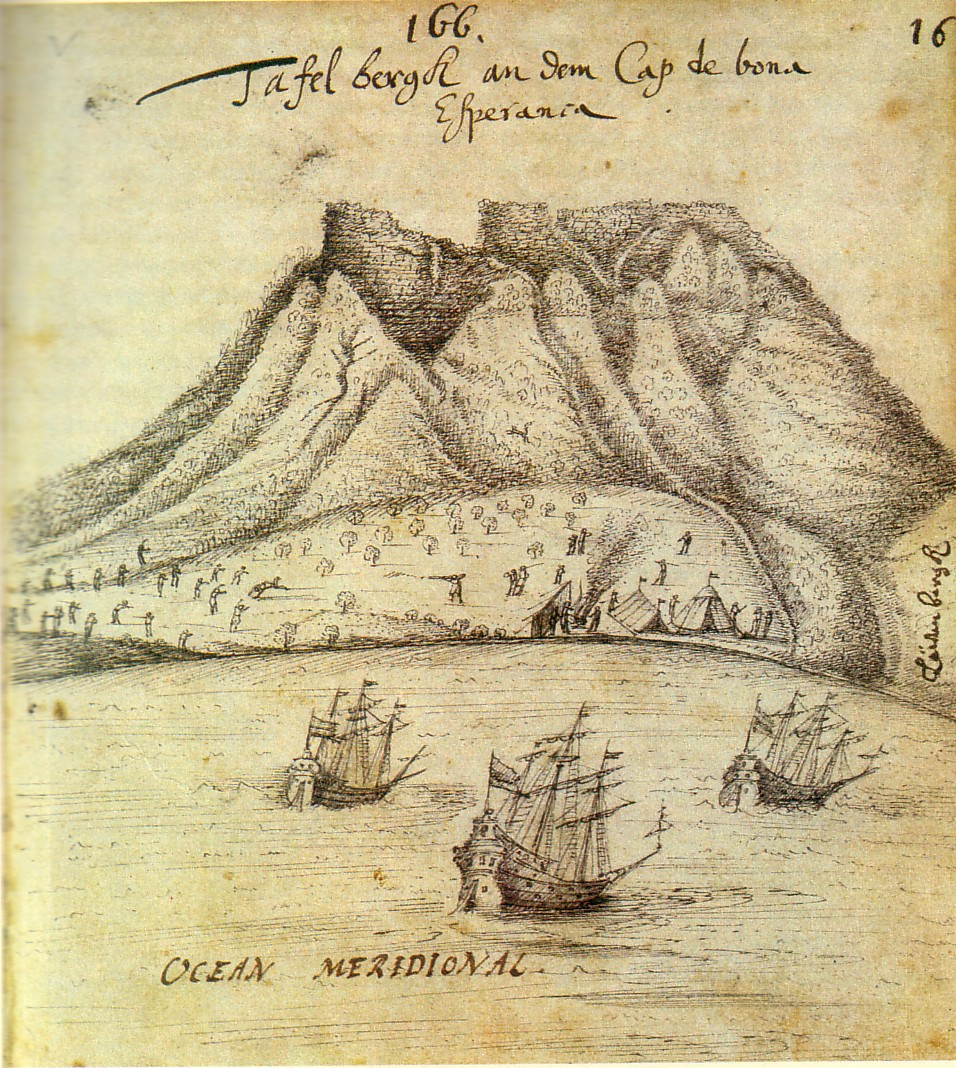
Sign at Cap de Bona Esperanca

On 6 April 1646, Caspar Schmalkalden set sail from Texel on his second voyage, bound for the Dutch East Indies via the Cape of Good Hope. He traveled on the ship König David with a fleet of three other ships. After spending several weeks in Dover due to unfavorable winds, the fleet continued in early May, following an incident in which the König David was struck by another ship and nearly broke apart.

On 24 May, the travelers passed the Canary Islands. Schmalkalden described Pico del Teide (which he called Pico Teneriffa or Pico de Terraira): "It is considered the highest mountain in the whole world, can be seen sixty miles out to sea, and its peaks are said to rise three miles above the clouds".

On 4 June, they reached the Cape Verde Islands, spending six days in Santiago. Schmalkalden noted frequent conflicts with the predominantly Spanish population, whom he described as bandits and reckless rabble. After crossing the equator for the third time on 5 July, the fleet sailed past the Abrolhos on 8 August and Tristan da Cunha on 5 September. That day, at the admiral's request, the ship Patientia was directed to sail to India, while the Elephant and König David transferred half their fresh water to the Patientia and landed at the Cape of Good Hope on 19 September.

During their nearly three-week stay in Table Bay, where Cape Town would be founded six years later, the crews bartered with the Khoi Khoi. Schmalkalden reported an incident on 22 September, when a Dutch guard accidentally shot a local, prompting demands for the soldier's execution. The admiral had the soldier bound and taken aboard a ship to appease the locals, but he was later released. On 28 September, Schmalkalden and seventeen others climbed Table Mountain, lighting a fire at the summit and drinking wine. Schmalkalden believed they were the first Europeans to reach the summit, though Portuguese explorer António de Saldanha had done so in 1503. On 7 October, the fleet continued, sighting St. Paul on 31 October and reaching the Sunda Strait on 5 December. After sighting Sumatra and Krakatau, they went ashore in Batavia on 11 December.

==== Dutch East Indies ====
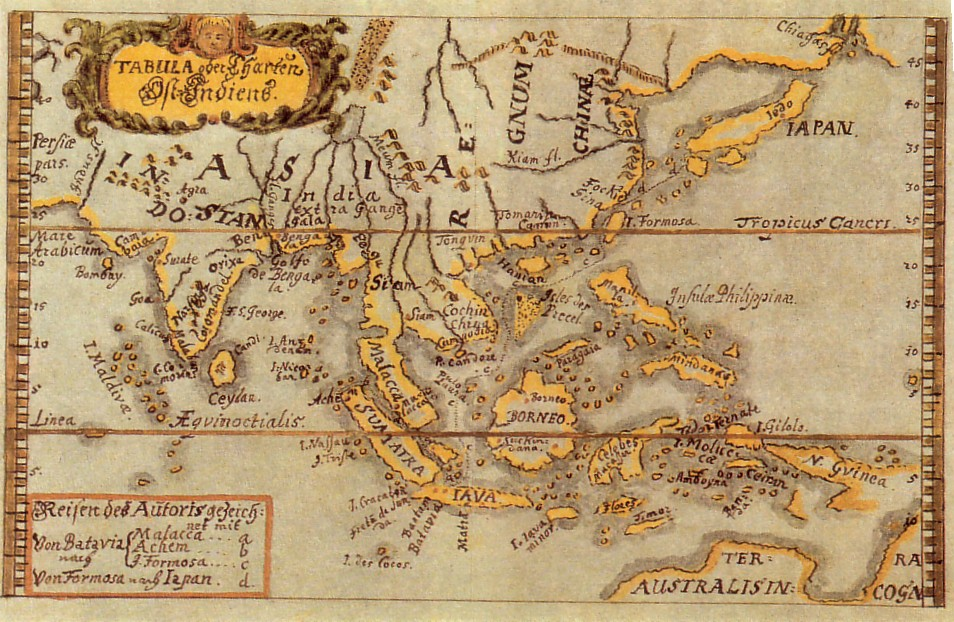
Tabula or Charten Ost-Indiens – Map of Southeast Asia with Caspar Schmalkalden's travel routes

Batavia, founded in 1619 by the Dutch East India Company, was the center of Dutch activities in Asia. Schmalkalden's stay coincided with a relatively peaceful period, as a truce had been agreed between the Portuguese and Dutch in 1642. Armed conflicts resumed later with uprisings in 1648 on Ambon and in 1650 on Ternate. Schmalkalden likely had opportunities to engage with Batavia's history and inhabitants.

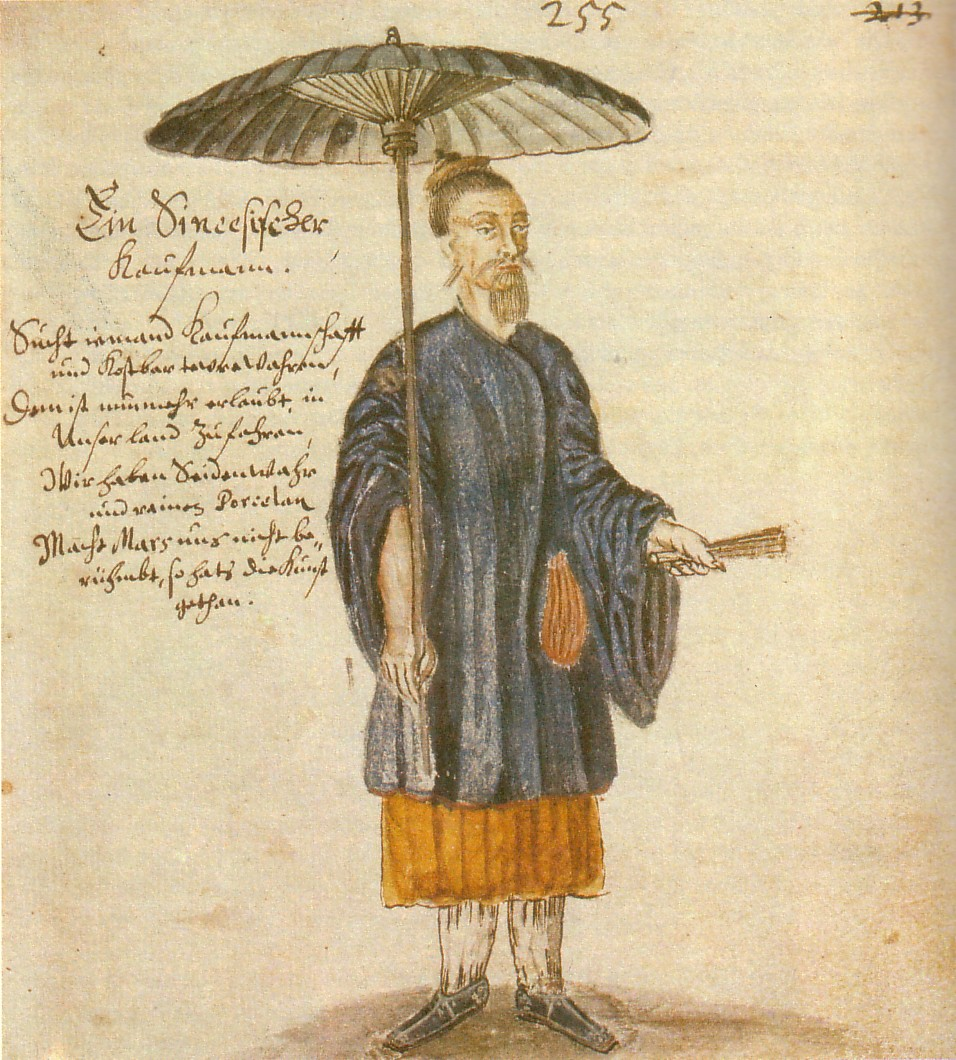
'A Sineesischer Kaufmann' (Chinese merchant)

After about seven months on Java, Schmalkalden accompanied the Dutch envoy Joan van Deutecom on a diplomatic mission to Aceh in the summer of 1647. He set off from Batavia on 11 July, reaching Banda Aceh on 5 August after a two-day stopover in Malacca, under Dutch rule since 1641.

On 22 August, the Queen of Aceh ceremoniously received the envoy, with animal fights involving elephants and buffaloes, which Schmalkalden described vividly. The queen met the envoy weekly until Ramadan began on 28 September, pausing meetings for a month. The delegation returned to Batavia on 24 November.

==== Taiwan ====
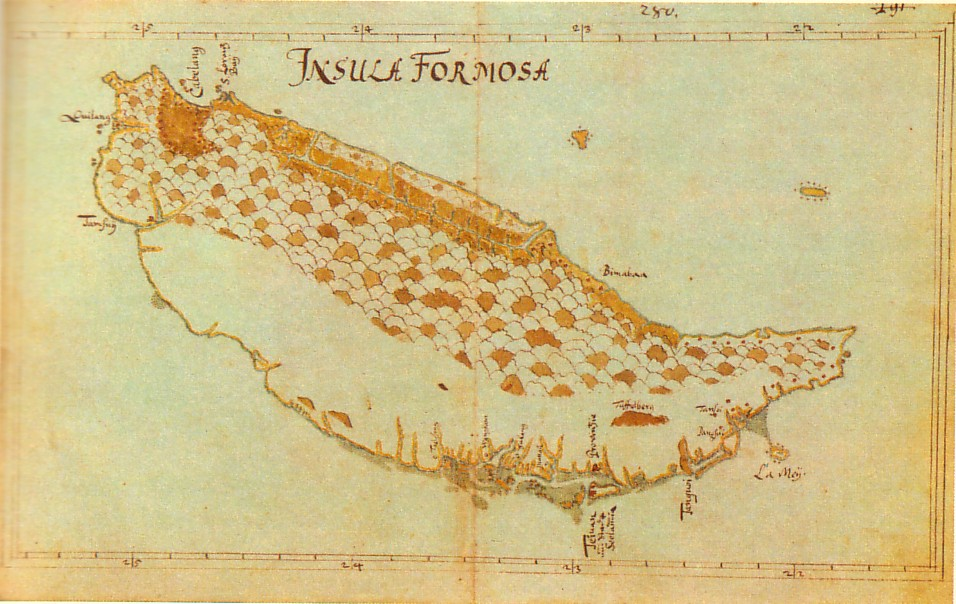
Insula Formosa (Taiwan)

In 1624, the Dutch established control over southwestern Taiwan, known as "Ilha Formosa," with their main base at Fort Zeelandia in Taiwan Bay (now part of Tainan). On 28 April 1648, Schmalkalden sailed for Zeelandia aboard the Patientia, traveling via Pulau Laut, Con Dao, the Paracel Islands, Cochinchina, and Hainan, arriving on 19 June.

On 27 July, Schmalkalden transitioned from soldier to land surveyor, remaining in Taiwan for about two years, studying its geography and culture. His travelogue's map details the Dutch-known areas of the island. Dutch rule, ending in 1661 with expulsion by Koxinga, disrupted indigenous tribes through Chinese immigration, village chief appointments, Dutch-run schools, and promotion of the Latin alphabet. Schmalkalden's travelogue documents these changes.

==== Japan ====
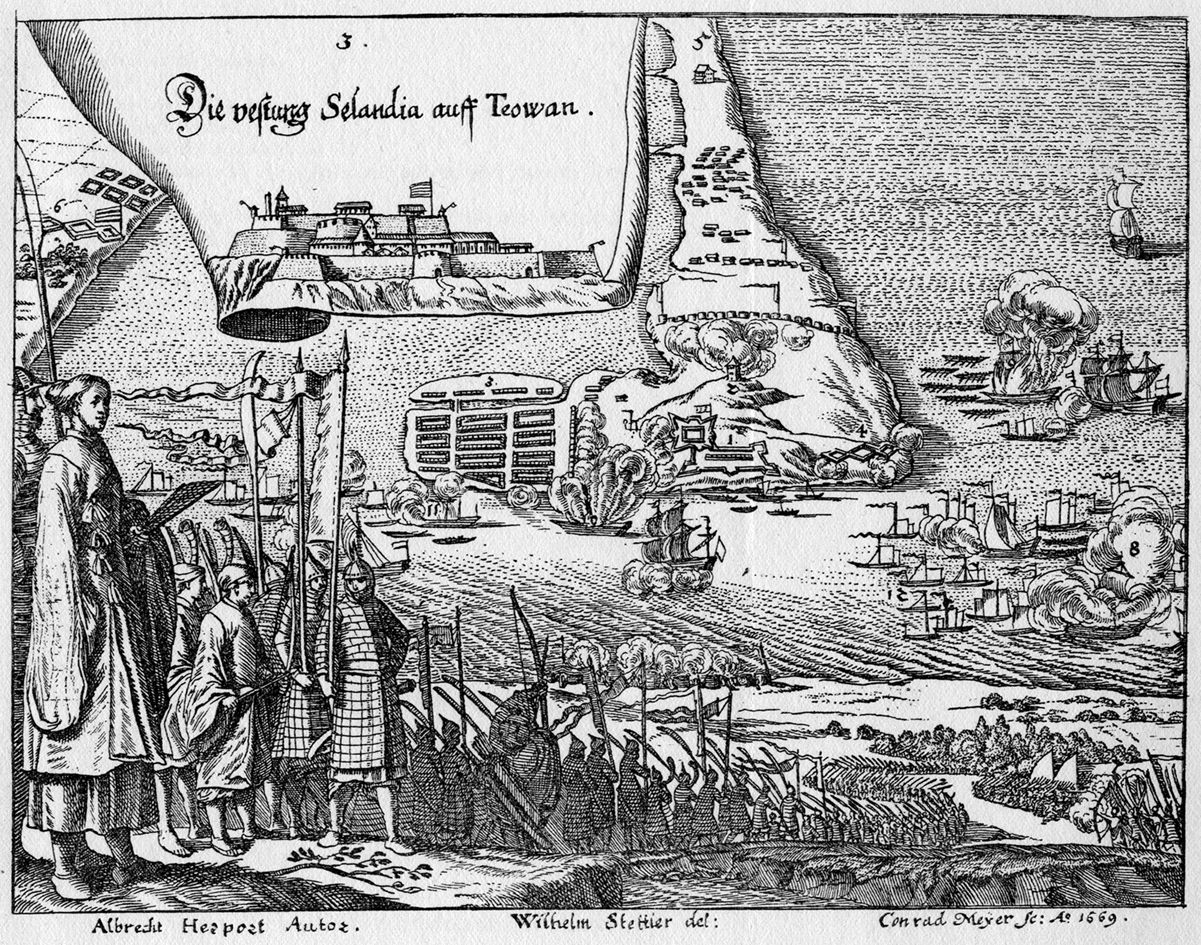
'The Fortress of Selandia on Teowan' during the siege by Koxinga. From: Albrecht Herport: Eine kurtze Ost-Indianische Reiß-Beschreibung (1669)

On 8 June 1650, after nearly two years in Taiwan, Schmalkalden sailed for Japan aboard the Patientia. On 22 June, the ship entered Nagasaki Bay, anchoring near Dejima. Japan restricted European trade, allowing only the Dutch to land at Dejima under strict regulations. Schmalkalden described the arrival:

All ship's crew were ordered to hand over and pack away all books on religious matters, spiritual paintings, and European coins. They were also forbidden, on pain of corporal punishment, to discuss anything related to religion with the Japanese, let alone to outwardly display any papist ceremonies. [...] The following day, several Japanese, including a Bonjos [= high official], came on board. They searched everything on the ship, including the pieces that were still loaded. Each man had to state his name, age, and rank, which was all diligently written down. Finally, they closed the ship and sailed back to land.

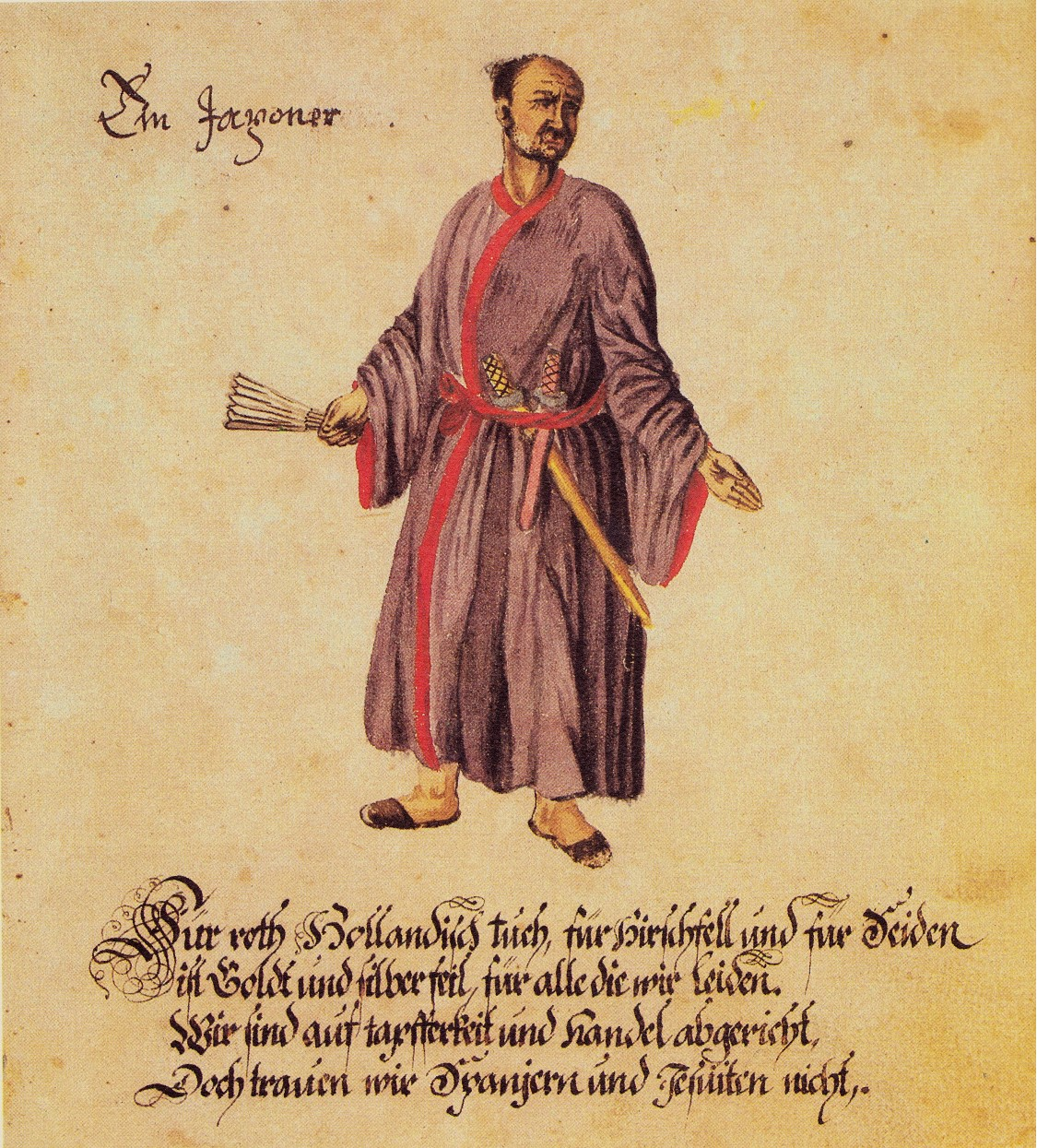
'A Japanese man'

Schmalkalden's description of Japan is brief, covering Nagasaki, Dejima, and the Japanese people. Service logs from Dejima suggest his 1650 date is incorrect, as the Patientia did not sail to Japan that year. If he visited, it was likely as a crew member, restricted to the ship during unloading, with his drawing of Nagasaki supporting a brief stay.

==== Return journey from East India ====
Schmalkalden remained in Taiwan until autumn 1651. When two ships were set to sail for Batavia, he requested discharge from the Dutch governor, who expressed surprise, noting Schmalkalden's recent promotion and potential for increased wages. Schmalkalden insisted on returning to his homeland, citing his vow to leave if he remained healthy:

The same person, having reviewed my request, replied that he was surprised that I was seeking dismissal, given that fortune had now smiled upon me. If I were to recommit myself, my wages and board would be increased once again. I therefore thanked him officially and remained firm in my resolution, considering that I had long since made a vow that if God kept me healthy in my service for the appointed time, I would not remain in India any longer, but would return to my fatherland, where the true Christian doctrine is practised in its purity, as soon as possible.

Few details survive of his return journey, as pages of his report are lost. He likely traveled to Batavia (Jakarta), possibly staying there or on Mauritius for four months, or visiting the Spice Islands, as suggested by illustrations of Fort Victoria on Ambon and Taluco on Ternate. In May 1652, he reached St. Helena, where the crew poached horses. The fleet likely sailed around the British Isles due to the First Anglo-Dutch War, arriving in Texel on 15 August 1652.

=== Further life ===
After over a decade in Dutch service, Schmalkalden settled in Gotha, Thuringia. He donated a bellows from a great paradise bird and self-made compasses and geometric instruments to the ducal art chamber of Ernst the Pious. Unlike many soldiers, he amassed a modest fortune, owning a house in Schwabhäuser Gasse, Gotha.

On 30 January 1655, he married Susanna Christina Kirchberger, daughter of Antonius Günther Kirchberger, in St. Margarethen's Church, Gotha. They had three children:

- Johann, born 9 November 1656
- Christian Günther, born 19 February 1659
- Adolphus Gottfriedus, born 18 November 1661

Schmalkalden's death circumstances are unknown. He appears in Gotha resident registers of 1665 and 1668 but not in 1675; he died in 1673.

== Travelogue ==
=== Manuscript ===
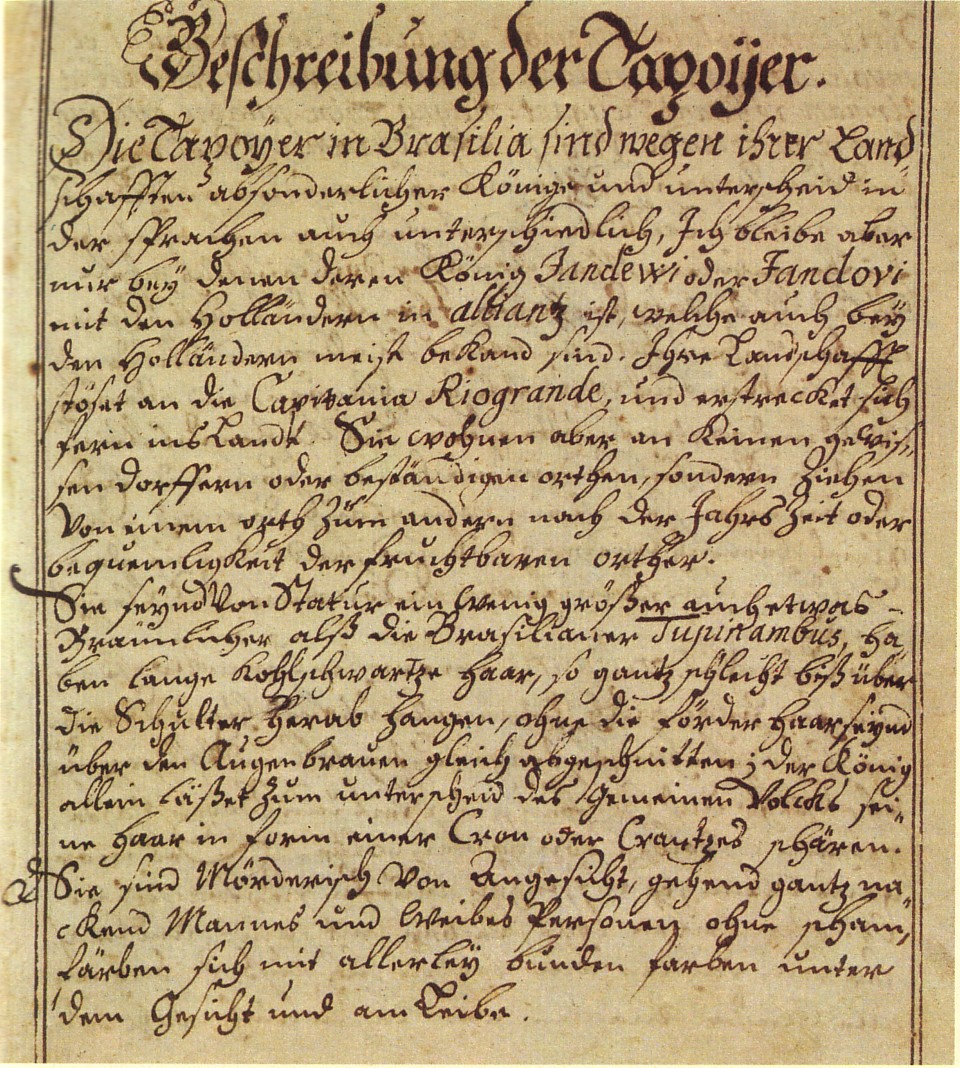
Description of the Tapoyer – page from Caspar Schmalkalden's travelogue

Schmalkalden's handwritten travelogue comprises 489 pages with 128 mostly colored pen-and-ink drawings. Some pages are missing. The manuscript features two handwritings: Schmalkalden's delicate script, confirmed by a 1665 family register entry, and a larger, unattributed script, possibly his son Christian Günther's. The report is factual, realistic, and entertaining, avoiding exaggerated language or mythical tales.

=== History ===
Schmalkalden likely compiled his travelogue in Thuringia after returning, drawing on notes and a German translation of Caspar van Baerle's work on Dutch Brazil. The manuscript was acquired by Johann Friedrich Blumenbach at a Gotha auction in the 18th century and added to Friedenstein Castle's library on 14 September 1790 (reference Chart B 533). In 1967, it was restored with Japanese paper. In 1983, Wolfgang Joost published it as Die wundersamen Reisen des Caspar Schmalkalden nach West- und Ostindien, adapting spelling and punctuation, and republished it in 2002 as Mit Kompass und Kanonen.

=== Contents ===
Schmalkalden's travelogue is structured:

- A chronological summary of the journey's stops and events.
- Geographical descriptions of destinations, detailing nature and culture.
- Descriptions of indigenous populations' culture and appearance.
- Accounts of notable animal and plant species, with illustrations.

This structure varies slightly, with brief information for short stops like the Cape of Good Hope. Schmalkalden relied on personal observations but included hearsay anecdotes for entertainment.

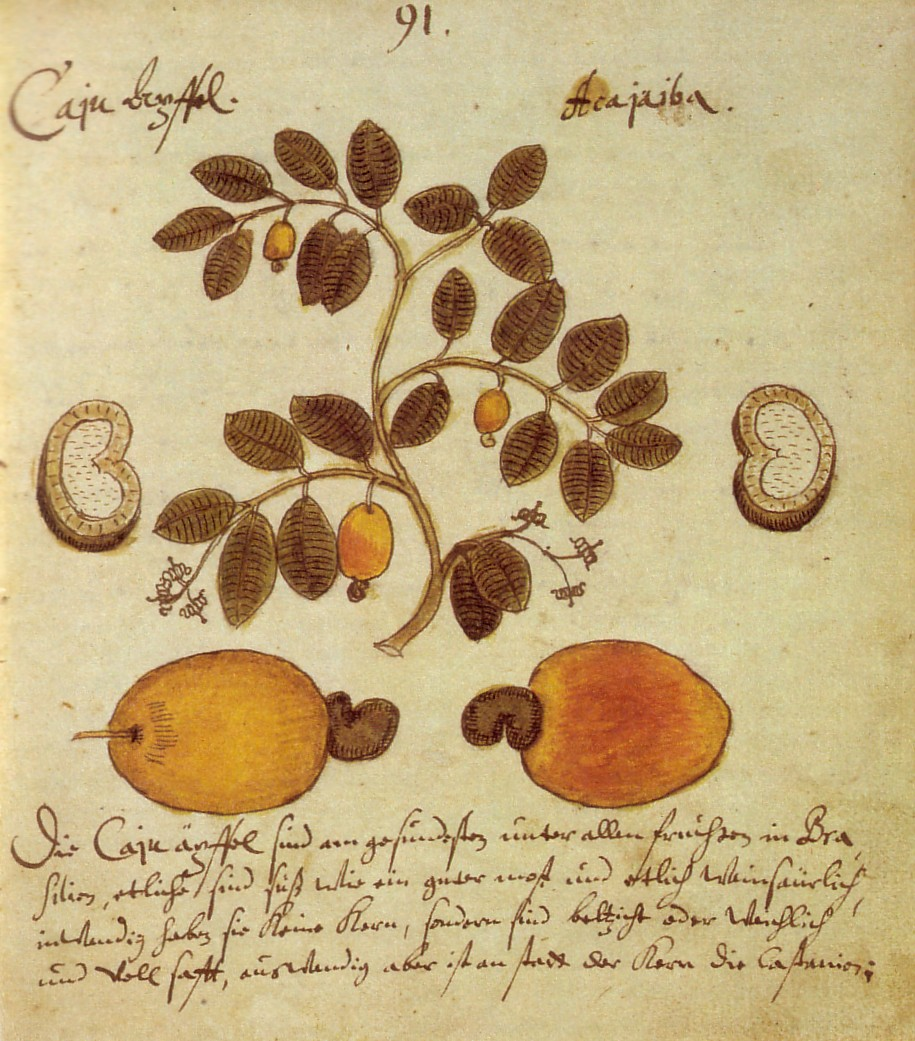
Cashew nuts

=== Ethnic descriptions ===
Schmalkalden's ethnographic accounts reflect 17th-century ethnocentrism, attributing non-Christian beliefs to ignorance of the "true God." He generalised groups like "Brazilians" and "Tapoyans" but aimed for objectivity, showing astonishment rather than rejection. His illustrations of ethnic groups include four-line verses, such as for a Brazilian woman:

As often as my husband travels, I quickly follow him,

Burdened with bags and luggage, and with a child in tow,

On the way back, I walk ahead, he follows behind,

That nothing befalls me, armed with a weapon of war.

He focused on gender roles, religion, customs, diet, and clothing, describing Chinese, Formosans, Japanese, and others, with particular detail on the Chinese in Batavia and Taiwan.

=== Significance ===
Although Schmalkalden's travelogue revealed no new European discoveries, it is a key historical source, especially for Taiwan and Japan. His high-quality drawings provide realistic depictions. His work aligns with reports by Georg Marggraf, Zacharias Wagner, and others, contributing to German travel literature on Dutch colonies.

== Bibliografia ==
- Michel, Wolfgang (1985). "Japan in Caspar Schmalkaldens Reisebuch" [Japan in Caspar Schmalkalden's travel book]. Dokufutsu Bungaku Kenkyû (in German) (35). Fukuoka: Kyushu University: 41–84.
- Michel, Wolfgang (2007). Schmalkalden, Caspar (in German). Vol. 23. Berlin: Duncker & Humblot. pp. 119–120. ISBN 978-3-428-11204-3.
- Schmalkalden, Caspar (2002). Mit Kompass und Kanonen. Abenteuerliche Reisen nach Brasilien und Fernost 1642–1652 [With compass and cannons. Adventurous voyages to Brazil and the Far East, 1642–1652] (in German). Edition Erdmann. ISBN 3-86503-109-9.
- Michel, Wolfgang (1986). "Ein frühes deutsch-japanisches Glossar aus dem 17. Jahrhundert" [An early German-Japanese glossary from the 17th century]. Kairos (in German) (24): 1–26.
