= Norbert Huber =

Italian luger (born 1964)

Medal record

Men's Luge

Representing Italy

Olympic Games
Silver medal – second place	1994 Lillehammer	Men's doubles
Bronze medal – third place	1992 Albertville	Men's doubles

World Championships
Gold medal – first place	1989 Winterberg	Mixed team
Gold medal – first place	1990 Calgary	Men's doubles
Silver medal – second place	1983 Lake Placid	Men's doubles
Silver medal – second place	1989 Winterberg	Men's doubles
Silver medal – second place	1990 Calgary	Mixed team
Silver medal – second place	1993 Calgary	Men's doubles
Bronze medal – third place	1991 Winterberg	Men's doubles
Bronze medal – third place	1991 Winterberg	Mixed team
Bronze medal – third place	1993 Calgary	Mixed team
Bronze medal – third place	1999 Königssee	Men's singles

World Cup Championships
Gold medal – first place	1984-85	Men's singles
Gold medal – first place	1984-85	Men's doubles
Gold medal – first place	1985-86	Men's singles
Gold medal – first place	1985-86	Men's doubles
Gold medal – first place	1986-87	Men's singles
Gold medal – first place	1988-89	Men's doubles
Gold medal – first place	1989-90	Men's doubles
Gold medal – first place	1990-91	Men's doubles
Gold medal – first place	1991-92	Men's doubles
Gold medal – first place	1992-93	Men's doubles
Silver medal – second place	1983-84	Men's singles
Silver medal – second place	1997-98	Men's singles
Bronze medal – third place	1983-84	Men's singles
Bronze medal – third place	1986-87	Men's singles
Bronze medal – third place	1987-88	Men's singles

European Championships
Gold medal – first place	1992 Winterberg	Men's doubles
Gold medal – first place	1994 Königssee	Men's doubles
Gold medal – first place	1994 Königssee	Mixed team
Silver medal – second place	1984 Olang	Men's singles
Silver medal – second place	1988 Königssee	Men's doubles
Silver medal – second place	1990 Igls	Men's doubles
Silver medal – second place	1992 Winterberg	Men's singles
Silver medal – second place	1998 Oberhof	Mixed team
Bronze medal – third place	1984 Olang	Men's doubles
Bronze medal – third place	1986 Hammarstrand	Men's doubles
Bronze medal – third place	1988 Königssee	Mixed team
Bronze medal – third place	1990 Igls	Mixed team
Bronze medal – third place	1992 Winterberg	Mixed team
Bronze medal – third place	1998 Oberhof	Men's singles

Norbert Huber (born 3 September 1964) is an Italian former luger who competed from the early 1980s to the late 1990s.

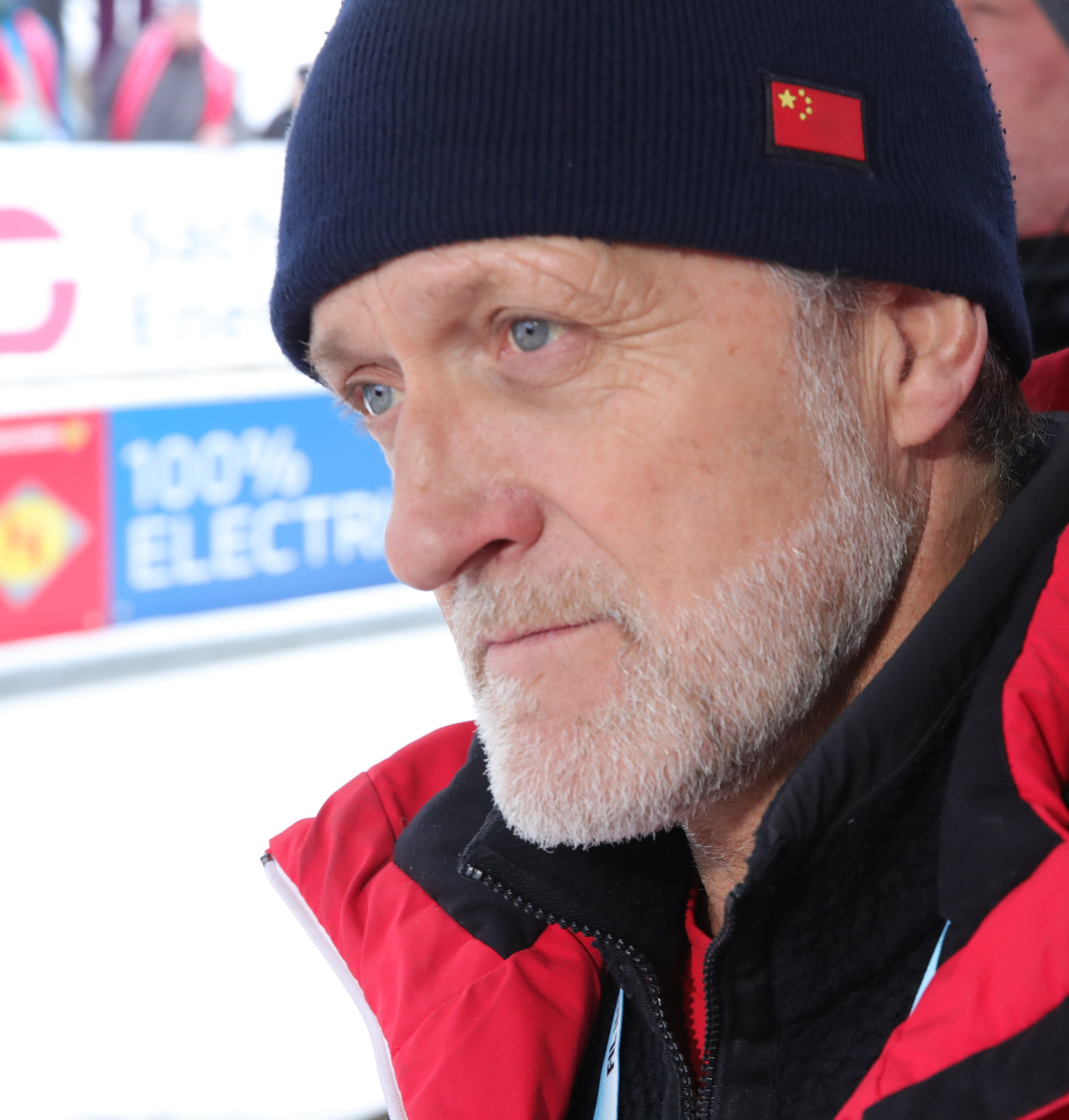

Huber was born in Bruneck, South Tyrol. Competing in four Winter Olympics, he won two medals in the men's doubles event with a silver in 1994 and a bronze in 1992.

Huber also won ten medals at the FIL World Luge Championships in with two gold (Mixed team: 1989, Men's doubles: 1990), four silvers (Men's doubles: 1983, 1989, 1993; Mixed team: 1990), and four bronzes (Men's singles: 1999, Men's doubles: 1991, Mixed team: 1991, 1993).

He also won fourteen medals in the FIL European Luge Championships with three gold (Men's doubles: 1992, 1994; Mixed team: 1994), five silvers (Men's singles: 1984, 1992; Men's doubles: 1988, 1990; Mixed team: 1998), and six bronzes (Men's singles: 1998, Men's doubles: 1984, 1986; Mixed team: 1988, 1990, 1992).

Huber also won 26 World Cup races and ten overall Luge World Cup titles (men's singles: 1984-5, 1985-6, 1986-7; men's doubles: 1984-5, 1985-6, 1988-9, 1989–90, 1990-1, 1991-2, 1992-3).
