= Luge at the 1984 Winter Olympics =

Luge at the XIV Olympic Winter Games
- Venue: Sarajevo Olympic Bobsleigh and Luge Track
- Dates: 9–12 February 1984
- Competitors: 81 from 17 nations

Luge at the 1984 Winter Olympics consisted of three events at Sarajevo Olympic Bobsleigh and Luge Track. The competition took place between 9 and 12 February 1984.

== Medal summary ==
=== Medal table ===
Rank	Nation	Gold	Silver	Bronze	Total
1	East Germany	1	1	2	4
2	Italy	1	0	0	1
2	West Germany	1	0	0	1
4	Soviet Union	0	2	1	3
Totals (4 entries)		3	3	3	9

East Germany led the medal table with four medals, one gold.

=== Events ===
Event	Gold		Silver		Bronze	
Men's singles	Paul Hildgartner; Italy	3:04.258	Sergey Danilin; Soviet Union	3:04.962	Valery Dudin; Soviet Union	3:05.012
Women's singles	Steffi Walter-Martin; East Germany	2:46.570	Bettina Schmidt; East Germany	2:46.873	Ute Oberhoffner-Weiß; East Germany	2:47.248
Doubles	West Germany; Hans Stanggassinger; Franz Wembacher	1:23.620	Soviet Union; Yevgeny Belousov; Aleksandr Belyakov	1:23.660	East Germany; Jörg Hoffmann; Jochen Pietzsch	1:23.887

== Participating NOCs ==
Seventeen nations participated in Luge at the Sarajevo Games. Puerto Rico and Yugoslavia made their Olympic luge debuts.

- Austria (7)
- Canada (2)
- West Germany (8)
- Great Britain (4)
- East Germany (10)
- Italy (9)
- Japan (5)
- Liechtenstein (1)
- Norway (2)
- Puerto Rico (1)
- Romania (3)
- Sweden (2)
- Czechoslovakia (3)
- Chinese Taipei (3)
- Soviet Union (10)
- United States (9)
- Yugoslavia (3)
