= Reinhardsbrunn (Verwaltungsgemeinschaft) =

Coordinates: 50°52′N 10°34′E

Reinhardsbrunn was a Verwaltungsgemeinschaft ("collective municipality") in the district of Gotha, in Thuringia, Germany. The seat of the Verwaltungsgemeinschaft was in Friedrichroda. It consisted of the following municipalities:

1. Ernstroda
2. Finsterbergen
3. Friedrichroda

The Verwaltungsgemeinschaft was disbanded on 1 December 2007. The municipalities Ernstroda and Finsterbergen were incorporated by Friedrichroda.
