= Helmut Brunner (luger) =

Italian luger (born 1961)

Medal record

Luge

European Championships
Gold medal – first place	1984 Olang	Men's doubles

Helmut Brunner (born 8 May 1961 in Stilfs) is an Italian luger who competed in the early 1980s. He won the gold medal in the men's doubles event at the 1984 FIL European Luge Championships in Olang, Italy.
