= Ernst Haspinger =

Italian luger (born 1955)

Medal record

Luge

World Championships
Bronze medal – third place	1981 Hammarstrand	Men's singles

European Championships
Bronze medal – third place	1980 Olang	Men's singles
Bronze medal – third place	1982 Winterberg	Men's singles
Bronze medal – third place	1984 Olang	Men's singles

Ernst Haspinger (born 2 July 1955, in Welsberg-Taisten) was an Italian luger who competed during the late 1970s and early 1980s. He won a bronze medal in the men's singles event at the 1981 FIL World Luge Championships in Hammarstrand, Sweden.

Haspinger also won three bronze medals in the men's singles event at the FIL European Luge Championships (1980, 1982, 1984).

He competed in three Winter Olympics, earning his best finish of seventh in the men's doubles event at Innsbruck in 1976.

He won the overall Luge World Cup title in men's singles three times (1979–80, 1980-1 (tied with compatriot Paul Hildgartner), and 1981-2).
