= Bettina Schmidt =

East German luger (1960–2019)

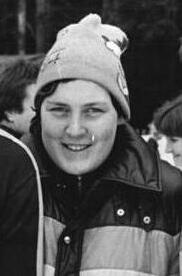
- Schmidt in 1984
Medal record
Women's Luge
Representing German Democratic Republic
Olympic Games
Silver medal – second place	1984 Sarajevo	Women's singles
World Cup Championships
Gold medal – first place	1983-84	Women's singles
Silver medal – second place	1979-80	Women's singles
European Championships
Gold medal – first place	1982 Winterberg	Women's singles

Bettina Schmidt (2 June 1960 – 28 April 2019) was an East German luger who competed during the mid-1980s. She was born in Staßfurt, Saxony-Anhalt. She won the silver medal in the women's singles event at the 1984 Winter Olympics in Sarajevo. Schmidt also won a gold medal in the women's singles event at the 1982 FIL European Luge Championships in Winterberg, West Germany. She tied for the overall Luge World Cup championship in women's singles in 1983–4 with fellow East German Steffi Martin.
