= Steffi Martin =

East German luger

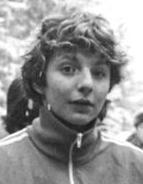
- Martin at the 1985 World championships in Oberhof, East Germany

Personal information
- Citizenship: Germany
- Born: 17 September 1962 Lauter, Saxony, East Germany
- Died: 21 June 2017 (aged 54)

Sport
- Country: Germany
- Sport: Luge
Medal record
Women's Luge
Representing East Germany
Olympic Games
Gold medal – first place	1984 Sarajevo	Women's singles
Gold medal – first place	1988 Calgary	Women's singles
World Championships
Gold medal – first place	1983 Lake Placid	Women's singles
Gold medal – first place	1985 Oberhof	Women's singles
World Cup Championships
Gold medal – first place	1983–84	Women's singles
European Championships
Silver medal – second place	1982 Winterberg	Women's singles
Silver medal – second place	1986 Hammarstrand	Women's singles

Steffi Martin Walter (17 September 1962 – 21 June 2017) was a German luger who competed during the 1980s, representing East Germany. She won two Olympic gold medals in the women's singles event, two gold medals at FIL World Luge Championships, one gold medal at FIL World Luge Championships, and two silver medals at FIL European Luge Championships.

== Personal life ==
Martin was born in Lauter, Saxony, on 17 September 1962. After marriage, she lived in Großdubrau with her husband and had three children. After their first child was born, she took a break from sports but returned later. She quit active sports due to family and health issues and worked as a physiotherapist. She completed her studies in law and worked in county administration. She was named an honorary citizen of Lauter in 1998.

== Career ==
Martin participated and won her first silver medal at the FIL European Luge Championships of 1982 held at Winterberg in Women's Single where Bettina Schmidt took the gold. She won the silver again in 1986 at Hammarstrand (Cerstin Schmidt won the gold.)

Martin won two gold medals in the women's singles event at the FIL World Luge Championships of 1983 at Lake Placid, New York, and of 1985 at Oberhof, Germany.

Martin was overall Luge World Cup champion in women's singles in 1983–84 shared with fellow East German Bettina Schmidt.

She won gold medal in the women's singles event, first at Sarajevo, Yugoslavia, at the 1984 Winter Olympics under her maiden name Martin. She then became the first woman to repeat as Olympic champion at Calgary, Alberta, Canada, in the 1988 Winter Olympics; now under her married name Walter. She completed the events in 2:46:570 and 3:03:973 respectively. Her record was equaled by Sylke Otto by winning gold in 2002 and 2006.

== Death ==
Martin died on 21 June 2017 from cancer. She had been diagnosed in October 2016.
