= Paul Hildgartner =

Italian luger (born 1952)

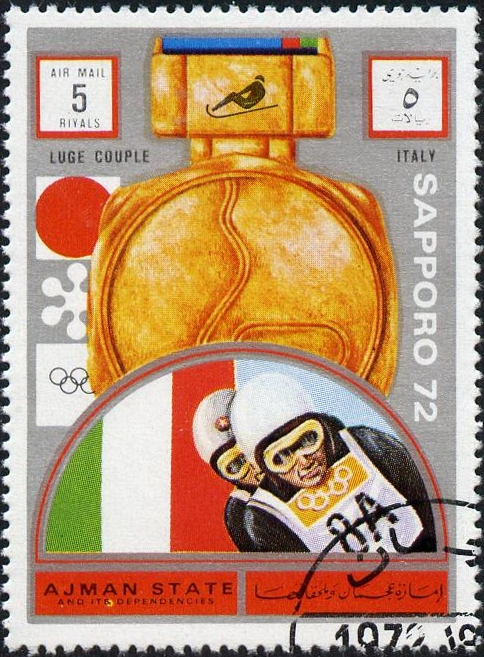
- Hildgartner and Walter Plaikner depicted on a 1972 postage stamp

Medal record

Men's luge

Representing Italy

Olympic Games
Gold medal – first place	1972 Sapporo	Men's doubles
Gold medal – first place	1984 Sarajevo	Men's singles
Silver medal – second place	1980 Lake Placid	Men's singles

World Championships
Gold medal – first place	1971 Olang	Men's doubles
Gold medal – first place	1978 Imst	Men's singles
Bronze medal – third place	1973 Oberhof	Men's doubles
Bronze medal – third place	1979 Königssee	Men's singles
Bronze medal – third place	1983 Lake Placid	Men's singles

European Championships
Gold medal – first place	1971 Imst	Men's doubles
Gold medal – first place	1974 Imst	Men's doubles
Gold medal – first place	1978 Hammarstrand	Men's singles
Gold medal – first place	1984 Olang	Men's singles
Silver medal – second place	1979 Oberhof	Men's singles
Bronze medal – third place	1988 Königssee	Mixed team

Paul Hildgartner (born 8 June 1952) is an Italian former luger who competed from the early 1970s to the late 1980s. He represented Italy at five Winter Olympic Games and won multiple medals. He was also a flag-bearer for Italy twice.

== Biography ==
Hildgartner was born in Chienes on June 8, 1952.

Hildgartner won five medals at the FIL World Luge Championships with two golds (Men's singles: 1978, Men's doubles: 1971) and three bronzes (Men's singles: 1979, 1983; Men's doubles: 1973). Additionally, he won six medals at the FIL European Luge Championships with four golds (Men's singles: 1978, 1984; Men's doubles: 1971, 1974), one silver (Men's singles: 1979), and one bronze (Mixed team: 1988). He also won the Luge World Cup overall title in men's singles in 1978-9, 1980-81 (tied with compatriot Ernst Haspinger), and 1982-3.

Hildegartner competed in five Winter Olympic Games from 1972 to 1988. He won gold medals in the 1972 Games and the 1984 Games and won a silver medal at the 1980 Games. He was Italy's flagbearer for the opening ceremonies in 1984 and 1988.

Winter Olympics
Preceded by Gustav Thöni	Flag bearer for Italy; 1984 Sarajevo 1988 Calgary	Succeeded by Alberto Tomba
