= Jörg-Dieter Ludwig =

East German luger

Medal record

Luge

World Championships
Silver medal – second place	1981 Hammarstrand	Men's doubles

European Championships
Gold medal – first place	1979 Oberhof	Men's doubles
Silver medal – second place	1982 Winterberg	Men's doubles

Jörg-Dieter Ludwig was an East German luger who competed in the early 1980s. He won the silver medal in the men's doubles event at the 1981 FIL World Luge Championships in Hammarstrand, Sweden.

Ludwig also won two medals in the men's doubles event at the FIL European Luge Championships with a gold in 1979 and a silver in 1982.
