= Leinatal =

- Municipality
- Coat of arms
- Interactive map of Leinatal
- Location within Germany Location within Thuringia
- Coordinates: 50°54′N 10°38′E
- Country: Germany
- State: Thuringia
- District: Gotha
- Disbanded: 2019

Area
  - Total: 36.02 km^{2} (13.91 sq mi)
- Elevation: 360 m (1,180 ft)

Population (2018-12-31)
  - Total: 3,581
  - Density: 99.42/km^{2} (257.5/sq mi)
- Time zone: UTC+01:00 (CET)
  - Summer (DST): UTC+02:00 (CEST)
- Postal codes: 99894
- Dialling codes: 03622; 036253; 03623
- Vehicle registration: GTH

Leinatal (German pronunciation: [ˈlaɪnaˌtaːl], lit. 'Leina Valley') is a former municipality in the district of Gotha, in Thuringia, Germany. Since December 2019, it is part of the municipality Georgenthal.
