= FIL European Luge Championships 1979 =

The FIL European Luge Championships 1979 took place in Oberhof, East Germany.

== Men's singles ==
Medal	Athlete	Time
Gold	Hans Rinn (GDR)	
Silver	Detlef Günther (GDR)	
Bronze	Bernhard Glass (GDR)	

== Women's singles ==
Medal	Athlete	Time
Gold	Melitta Sollmann (GDR)	
Silver	Ilona Brand (GDR)	
Bronze	Margit Schumann (GDR)	

== Men's doubles ==
Medal	Athlete	Time
Gold	East Germany (Bernd Oberhoffner, Jörg-Dieter Ludwig)	
Silver	East Germany (Hans Rinn, Norbert Hahn)	
Bronze	Italy (Karl Brunner, Peter Gschnitzer)	

== Medal table ==
Rank	Nation	Gold	Silver	Bronze	Total
1	East Germany (GDR)	3	3	2	8
2	Italy (ITA)	0	0	1	1
Totals (2 entries)		3	3	3	9
