= Karsten Albert =

German luger (born 1968)

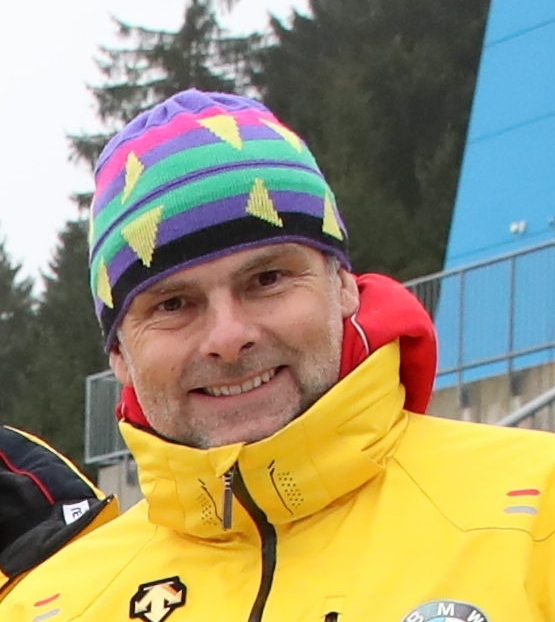
- Karsten Albert, German Luge Championships Oberhof 2019

Medal record

Luge

World Championships
Silver medal – second place	2001 Calgary	Mixed team

European Championships
Gold medal – first place	1998 Oberhof	Mixed team
Silver medal – second place	1998 Oberhof	Men's singles
Silver medal – second place	2000 Winterberg	Mixed team

Karsten Albert (born 13 October 1968) is a German luger who competed from 1998 to 2003. He won a silver medal in the mixed team event at the 2001 FIL World Luge Championships in Calgary, Alberta, Canada.

Albert also won three medals at the FIL European Luge Championships with one gold (Mixed team: 1998) and two silvers (Men's singles: 1998, Mixed team: 2000. Albert also finished sixth in the men's singles event at the 2002 Winter Olympics in Salt Lake City.
