= FIL World Luge Championships 1983 =

The FIL World Luge Championships 1983 took place in Lake Placid, New York, United States. It marked the first time that the championships took place outside Europe.

== Men's singles ==
Medal	Athlete	Time
Gold	Miroslav Zajonc (CAN)	
Silver	Sergey Danilin (URS)	
Bronze	Jens Müller (GDR)	

Zanjonc becomes the first non-European champion of the event. He is the first Canadian to medal at the World Championships.

== Women's singles ==
Medal	Athlete	Time
Gold	Steffi Martin (GDR)	
Silver	Melitta Sollmann (GDR)	
Bronze	Ute Weiss (GDR)	

== Men's doubles ==
Medal	Athlete	Time
Gold	East Germany (Jörg Hoffmann, Jochen Pietzsch)	
Silver	Italy (Hansjorg Raffl, Norbert Huber)	
Bronze	West Germany (Hans Stangassinger, Franz Wembacher)	

== Medal table ==
Rank	Nation	Gold	Silver	Bronze	Total
1	East Germany (GDR)	2	1	2	5
2	Canada (CAN)	1	0	0	1
3	Italy (ITA)	0	1	0	1
3	Soviet Union (URS)	0	1	0	1
5	West Germany (FRG)	0	0	1	1
Totals (5 entries)		3	3	3	9
