= Uwe Handrich =

German luger (born 1959)

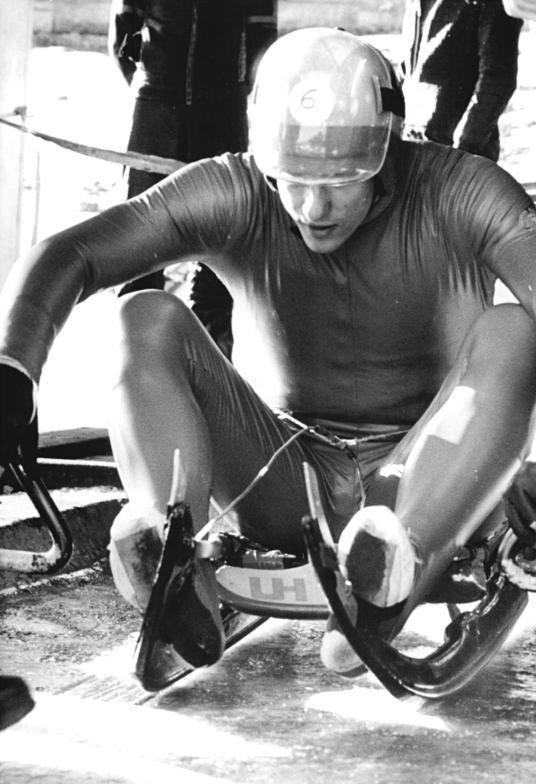
- Uwe Handrich in 1982

Medal record

Luge

European Championships
Gold medal – first place	1982 Winterberg	Men's singles

Uwe Handrich (born 26 April 1959 in Elgersburg) is a former East German luger who competed during the early 1980s. He won the gold medal in the men's singles event at the 1982 FIL European Luge Championships in Winterberg, West Germany.
