= FIL European Luge Championships 1982 =

The FIL European Luge Championships 1982 took place in Winterberg, West Germany.

== Men's singles ==
Medal	Athlete	Time
Gold	Uwe Handrich (GDR)	
Silver	Sergey Danilin (URS)	
Bronze	Ernst Haspinger (ITA)	

== Women's singles ==
Medal	Athlete	Time
Gold	Bettina Schmidt (GDR)	
Silver	Steffi Martin (GDR)	
Bronze	Melitta Sollmann (GDR)	

== Men's doubles ==
Medal	Athlete	Time
Gold	Austria (Günther Lemmerer, Reinhold Sulzbacher)	
Silver	East Germany (Hans Rinn, Jörg-Dieter Ludwig)	
Bronze	West Germany (Hans Stangassinger, Franz Wembacher)	

== Medal table ==
Rank	Nation	Gold	Silver	Bronze	Total
1	East Germany (GDR)	2	2	1	5
2	Austria (AUT)	1	0	0	1
3	Soviet Union (URS)	0	1	0	1
4	Italy (ITA)	0	0	1	1
4	West Germany (FRG)	0	0	1	1
Totals (5 entries)		3	3	3	9
