= Ernstroda =

- Village of Friedrichroda
- Coat of arms
- Interactive map of Ernstroda
- Location within Germany Location within Thuringia
- Coordinates: 50°52′N 10°37′E
- Country: Germany
- State: Thuringia
- District: Gotha
- Town: Friedrichroda

Area
  - Total: 10.88 km^{2} (4.20 sq mi)
- Elevation: 360 m (1,180 ft)

Population (2006-12-31)
  - Total: 1,026
  - Density: 94.30/km^{2} (244.2/sq mi)
- Time zone: UTC+01:00 (CET)
  - Summer (DST): UTC+02:00 (CEST)
- Postal codes: 99894
- Dialling codes: 03623

Ernstroda is a former municipality in the district of Gotha, in Thuringia, Germany. Since 1 December 2007, it is part of the town Friedrichroda.

== See also ==
- Reinhardsbrunn
