= Bernhard Glass =

East German luger (born 1957)

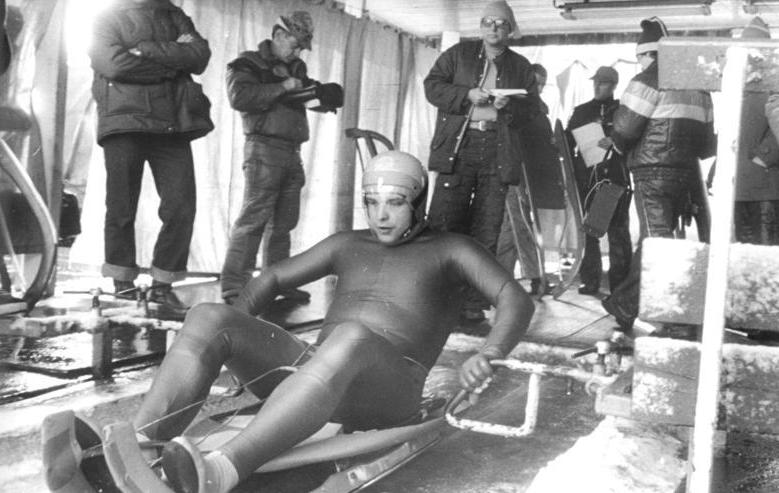
- Glass at a race in 1981

Personal information
- Born: 6 November 1957 (age 68)
Medal record
Men's luge
Representing East Germany
Olympic Games
| Gold medal – first place | 1980 Lake Placid | Men's singles |
European Championships
| Bronze medal – third place | 1979 Oberhof | Men's singles |

Bernhard Glass (born 6 November 1957) is an East German former luger who competed in the late 1970s and early 1980s. He won the gold medal in the men's singles event at the 1980 Winter Olympics in Lake Placid, New York.

Glass also won a bronze medal in the men's singles event at the 1979 FIL European Luge Championships in Oberhof, East Germany.

After his retirement from luge as an athlete, Glass became a luge coach. Among his famous pupils in luge were Silke Kraushaar, Tatjana Hüfner, and David Möller while others who started in luge, but later went to bobsleigh included André Lange and Sandra Kiriasis. In July 2010, Glass became a coach of the Canadian Luge Association.
