= Ilona Brand =

German luger

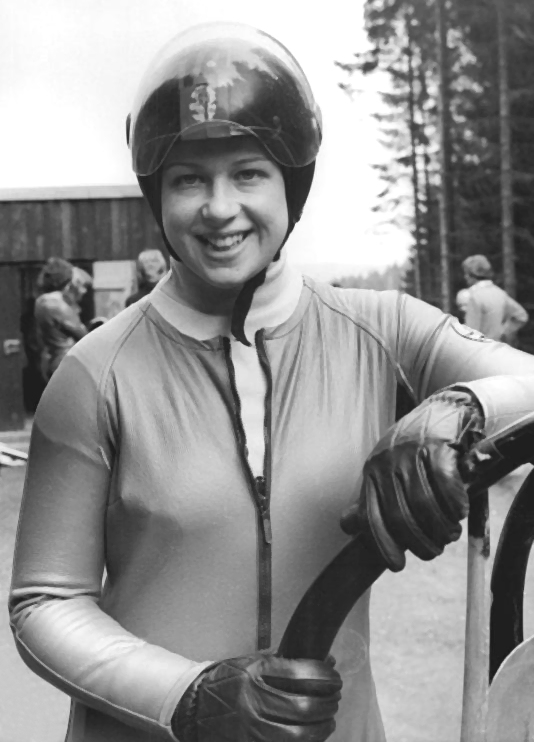
- Ilona Brand.

Medal record

Luge

European Championships
Silver medal – second place	1979 Oberhof	Women's singles
Bronze medal – third place	1980 Olang	Women's singles

Ilona Brand (born 17 April 1958) is an East German luger who competed during the late 1970s and early 1980s. She won two medals in the women's singles event at the FIL European Luge Championships with a silver in 1979 and a bronze in 1980.

Brand also finished fifth in the women's singles event at the 1980 Winter Olympics in Lake Placid.
