= Finsterbergen =

- Village of Friedrichroda
- Coat of arms
- Interactive map of Finsterbergen
- Location within Germany Location within Thuringia
- Coordinates: 50°50′N 10°35′E
- Country: Germany
- State: Thuringia
- District: Gotha
- Town: Friedrichroda

Area
  - Total: 7.57 km^{2} (2.92 sq mi)
- Elevation: 495 m (1,624 ft)

Population (2006-12-31)
  - Total: 1,426
  - Density: 188/km^{2} (488/sq mi)
- Time zone: UTC+01:00 (CET)
  - Summer (DST): UTC+02:00 (CEST)
- Postal codes: 99898
- Dialling codes: 03623
- Website: www.finsterbergen.de

Finsterbergen is a former municipality in the district of Gotha, in Thuringia, Germany. Since 1 December 2007, it is part of the town Friedrichroda.

== See also ==
- Reinhardsbrunn
