= Melitta Sollmann =

East German luger (born 1958)

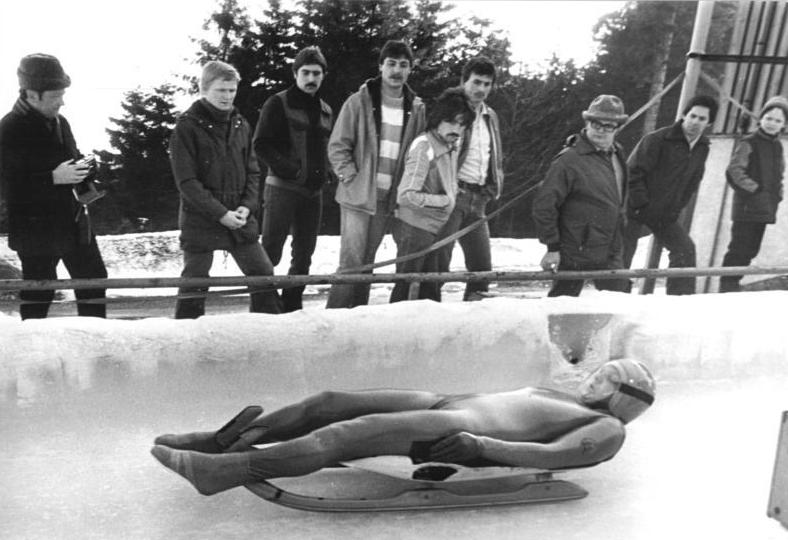
- Melitta Sollmann in 1981.
Medal record
Women's Luge
Representing East Germany
Olympic Games
| Silver medal – second place | 1980 Lake Placid | Women's singles |
World Championships
| Gold medal – first place | 1979 Königssee | Women's singles |
| Gold medal – first place | 1981 Hammarstrand | Women's singles |
| Silver medal – second place | 1983 Lake Placid | Women's singles |
European Championships
| Gold medal – first place | 1979 Oberhof | Women's singles |
| Gold medal – first place | 1980 Olang | Women's singles |
| Bronze medal – third place | 1982 Winterberg | Women's singles |

Melitta Sollmann (born 20 August 1958 in Gotha, Thuringia) is an East German luger who competed from the late 1970s to the mid-1980s. She won the silver medal in the women's singles event at the 1980 Winter Olympics in Lake Placid, New York.

Sollmann also won three medals in the women's singles event at the FIL World Luge Championships with two golds (1979, 1981) and one silver (1983). She also won three medals in the women's singles event at the FIL European Luge Championships with two golds (1979, 1980) and one bronze (1982).

Sollmann's best overall Luge World Cup finish was third in 1982-3.
