= Olang =

- Comune
- Gemeinde Olang; Comune di Valdaora
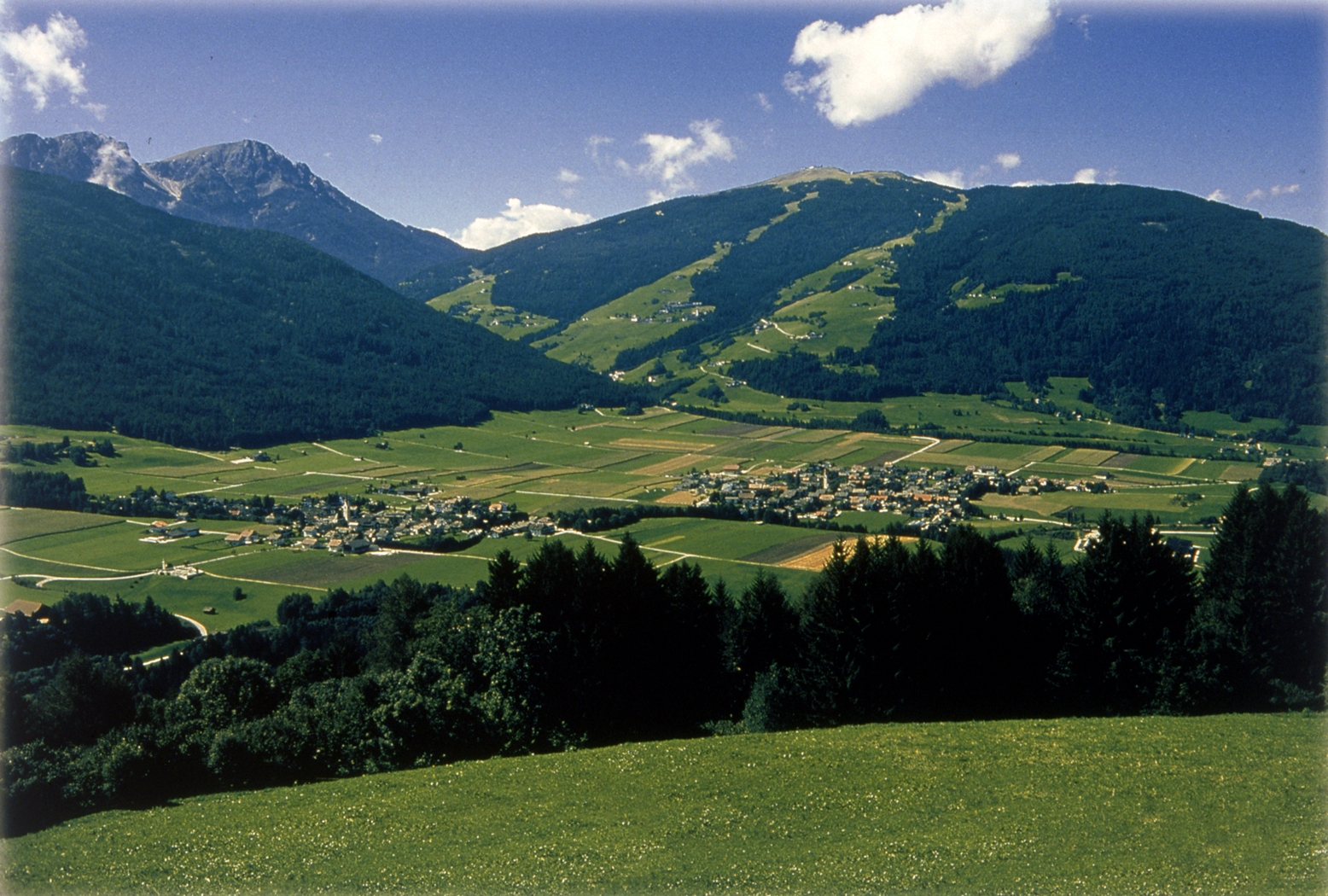
- View of Olang

- Location within Italy Location within Trentino-Alto Adige/Südtirol
- Coordinates: 46°46′N 12°2′E
- Country: Italy
- Region: Trentino-Alto Adige/Südtirol
- Province: South Tyrol (BZ)
- Frazioni: Geiselsberg (Sorafurcia), Mitterolang (Valdaora di Mezzo), Niederolang (Valdaora di Sotto), Oberolang (Valdaora di Sopra)

Government
  - Mayor: Lukas Schnarf

Area
  - Total: 49.0 km^{2} (18.9 sq mi)

Population (Dec. 2015)
  - Total: 3,132
  - Density: 63.9/km^{2} (166/sq mi)
- Demonym(s): German: Olanger; Italian: di Valdaora
- Time zone: UTC+1 (CET)
  - Summer (DST): UTC+2 (CEST)
- Postal code: 39030
- Dialing code: 0474
- Website: Official website

Olang (German pronunciation: [ˈoˑlaŋ]; Italian: Valdaora [valˈdaːora]) is a comune (municipality) in South Tyrol in northern Italy, located about 60 kilometres (37 mi) northeast of the city of Bolzano.

== Geography ==
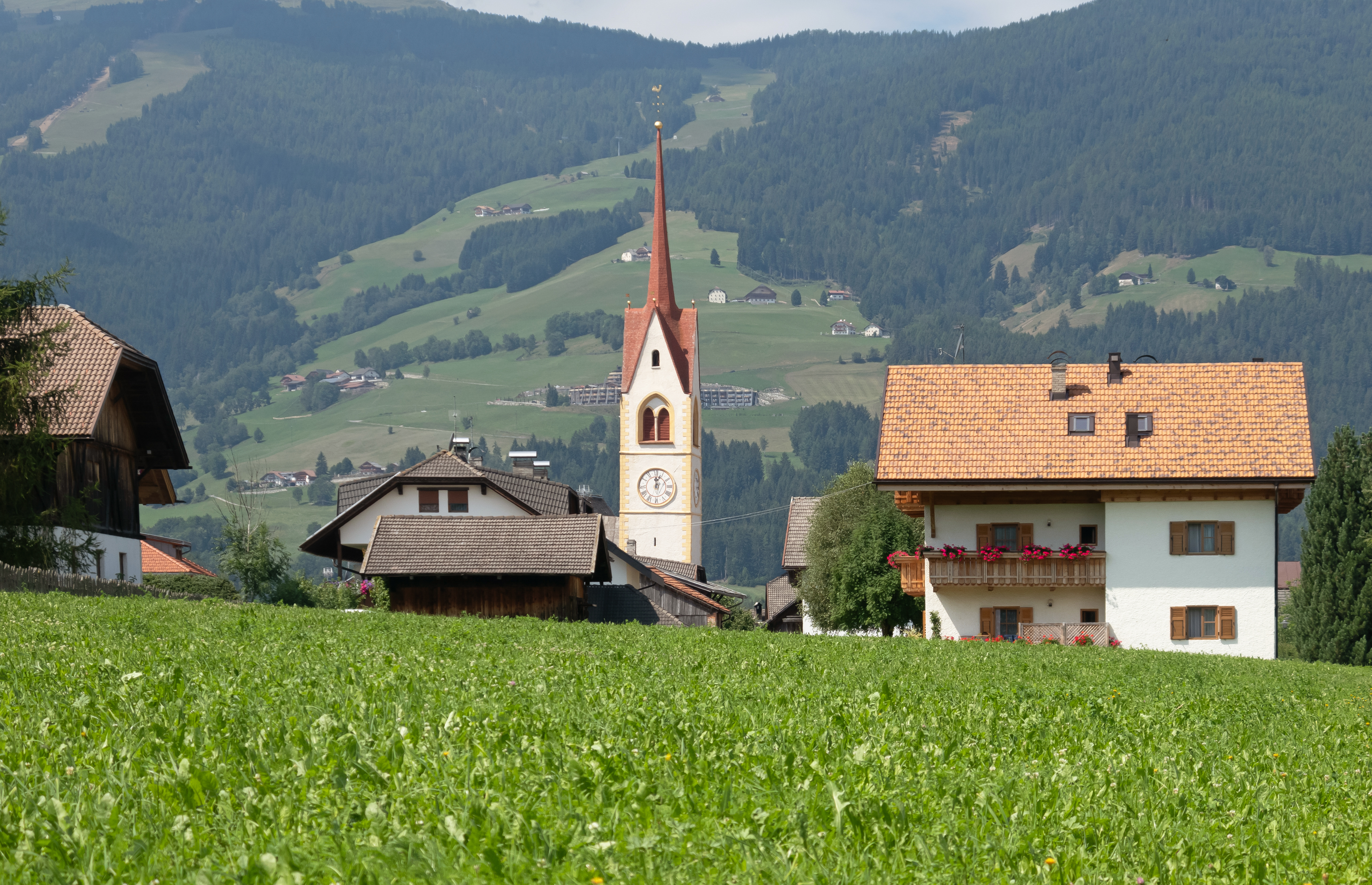
Parish Church in Oberolang

As of 31 December 2015, it had a population of 3,132 and an area of 49.0 square kilometres (18.9 mi^{2}).

Olang borders the following municipalities: Bruneck, Mareo, Prags, Rasen-Antholz, and Welsberg-Taisten.

=== Frazioni ===
The municipality of Olang contains the frazioni (subdivisions, mainly villages and hamlets) Geiselsberg (Sorafurcia), Mitterolang (Valdaora di Mezzo), Niederolang (Valdaora di Sotto) and Oberolang (Valdaora di Sopra).

== History ==
=== Coat-of-arms ===
The emblem is argent a bend vert on which are represented three cart’s wheels. The wheels symbolize the villages of Mitterolang, Oberolang and Niederolang and their disposition in the valley. The emblem was granted in 1968.

== Society ==
=== Linguistic distribution ===
According to the 2024 census, 95.64% of the population speak German, 3.89% Italian and 0.47% Ladin as first language.

=== Demographic evolution ===
Historical population

Year	Pop.	±%
1861	?	—
1871	?	—
1881	?	—
1901	?	—
1911	?	—

Year	Pop.	±%
1921	1,524	—
1931	1,633	+7.2%
1936	1,771	+8.5%
1951	1,816	+2.5%
1961	1,941	+6.9%

Year	Pop.	±%
1971	2,096	+8.0%
1981	2,300	+9.7%
1991	2,591	+12.7%
2001	2,797	+8.0%

Source: Data from ISTAT

== Notable people ==
- Hansjörg Raffl, an Italian luger, two-time Olympic medalist
