= Kittelsthal Dripstone Cave =

Cave in the Thuringian Forest

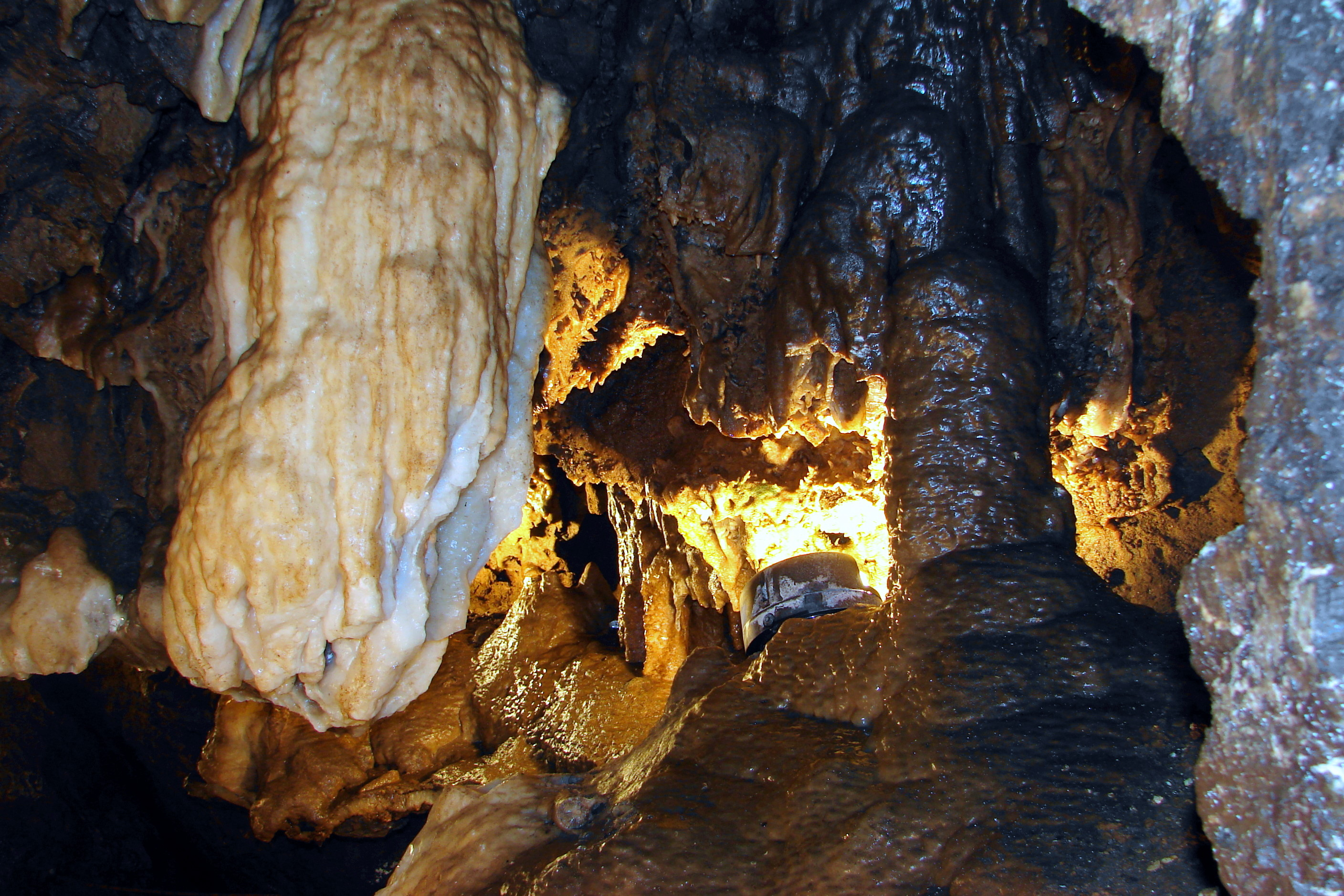
- Pyramid in the Big Grotto

- Location within Germany
- 50°55′23.3″N 10°23′33.7″E
- Location: Thuringian Forest
- Country: Germany

Specifications
- Capacity: 726 metres (2,382 ft)
- Length: 158 metres (518 ft)

Kittelsthal Dripstone Cave (German: Kittelsthaler Tropfsteinhöhle) is a cave in the Thuringian Forest. It is located in the Kittelsthal district of the town of Ruhla in the Wartburg district. The cave is accessible via a former mine. The total length is 726 meters; during guided tours it is walked along a length of 158 meters. One reaches the cave, which is 48 meters lower, via 228 steps. The first natural cavities were discovered in 1888. In 1894 it was turned into a show cave and opened in 1896. Between 1968 and 1992 there were no guided tours in the cave.

== Location ==
The cave is located in the Ruhla district of Kittelsthal in Wolfsberg, a small mountain (348 m.a.s.l.) on the northeast slope of the northwestern Thuringian Forest and in the northwestern part of the Thuringian Forest Nature Park. The village center of Kittelsthal is southwest of the Wolfsberg, and Erbstrom, the Hörsel tributary, flows by to the east.

== History ==
=== Natural caves ===
The area around Thal is particularly rich in natural caves and columns. The Ritterhöhle, the Hohle Stein, the Backofenloch and some others were already visited by people in the Middle Age; the legends about Venediger are particularly numerous in the region.

=== Mining ===
In the Kittelsthal area, mining has been practiced with varying success since the late Middle Ages; this is still evidenced by numerous pits and hollow ways in the forest terrain from the Spitzigen Stein, at the Zange forestry site in the direction of Mosbach and Ruhla. There are also so-called farmer's shafts in the open terrain, on the southern edge of the village. Copper ore was initially mined here. The mining of gypsum at Kittelsthal was of particular importance, because in the 18th century gypsum was a valuable building material; Kittelsthal gypsum was supplied as far away as Weimar.

Since the 19th century, the copper ore deposits have been considered mined; the local miners now mainly searched for barite (barytes) and fluorite (fluorspar). Until the beginning of the 20th century, there were several barite mines at Wolfsberg with shafts leading vertically downwards. This second phase of the local mining history, however, was of little importance for Kittelsthal and, except for barite mining, had little success. In 1924, mining in Wolfsberg came to a halt for economic reasons.

=== Discovery and exploration of the dripstone cave ===
In 1888, natural cavities in the Wolfsberg I mine were mentioned for the first time. The mining official Henninger from Elgersburg depicted the Big Grotto in a vertical course profile. During excavations, miners repeatedly discovered parts of the cave. However, these were mostly small in size, covered with sediments and in a condition not worth preserving. The cavities were therefore partially filled with overburden in most mining areas. In the beginning, this also happened to some extent with the cave in Kittelsthal. After the mine owners recognized its show value, the backfilling was stopped. In 1894, more cavities were discovered in Wolfsberg, so it was decided to develop the cave as a show cave.

=== Show cave ===
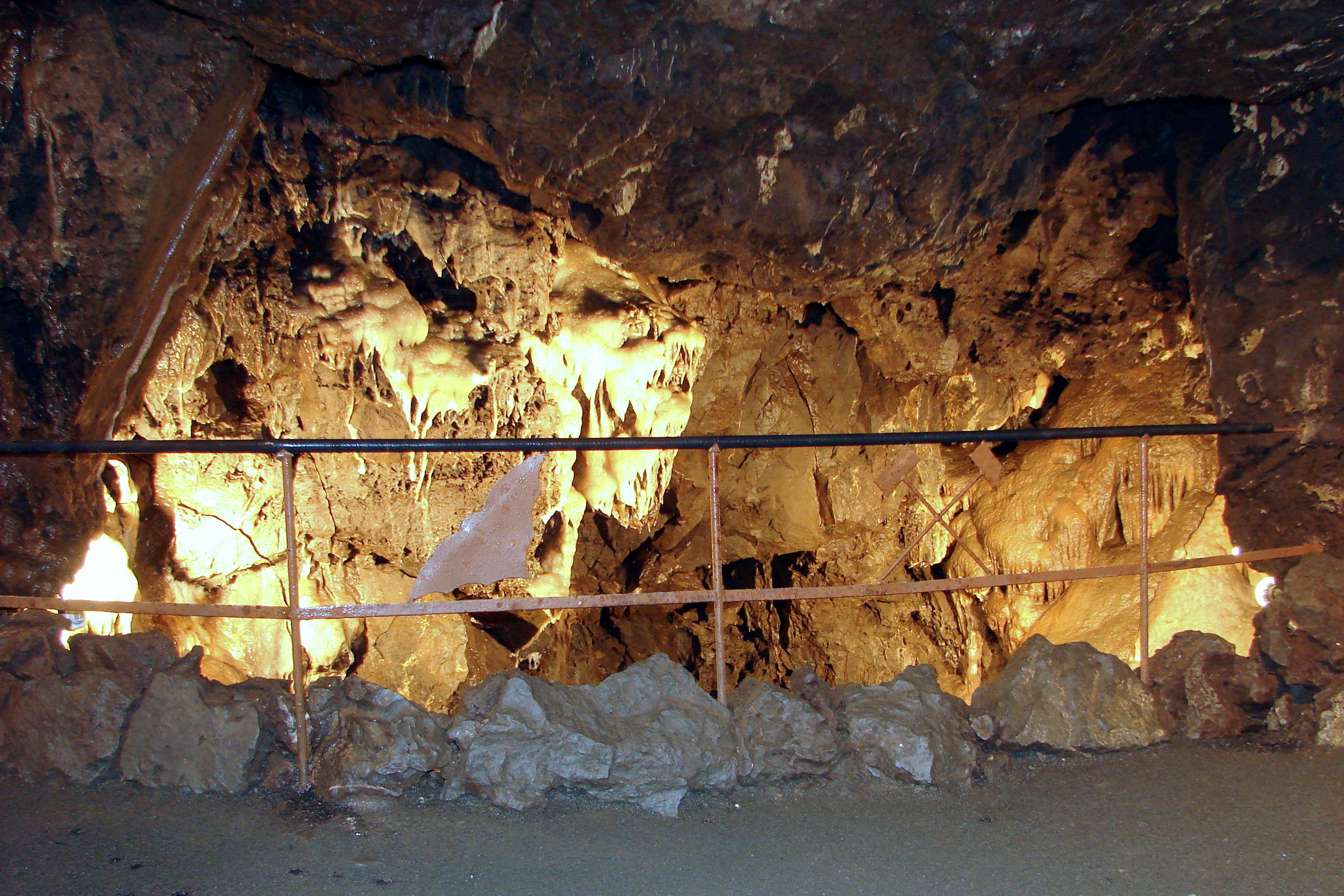
Wolfsschlucht

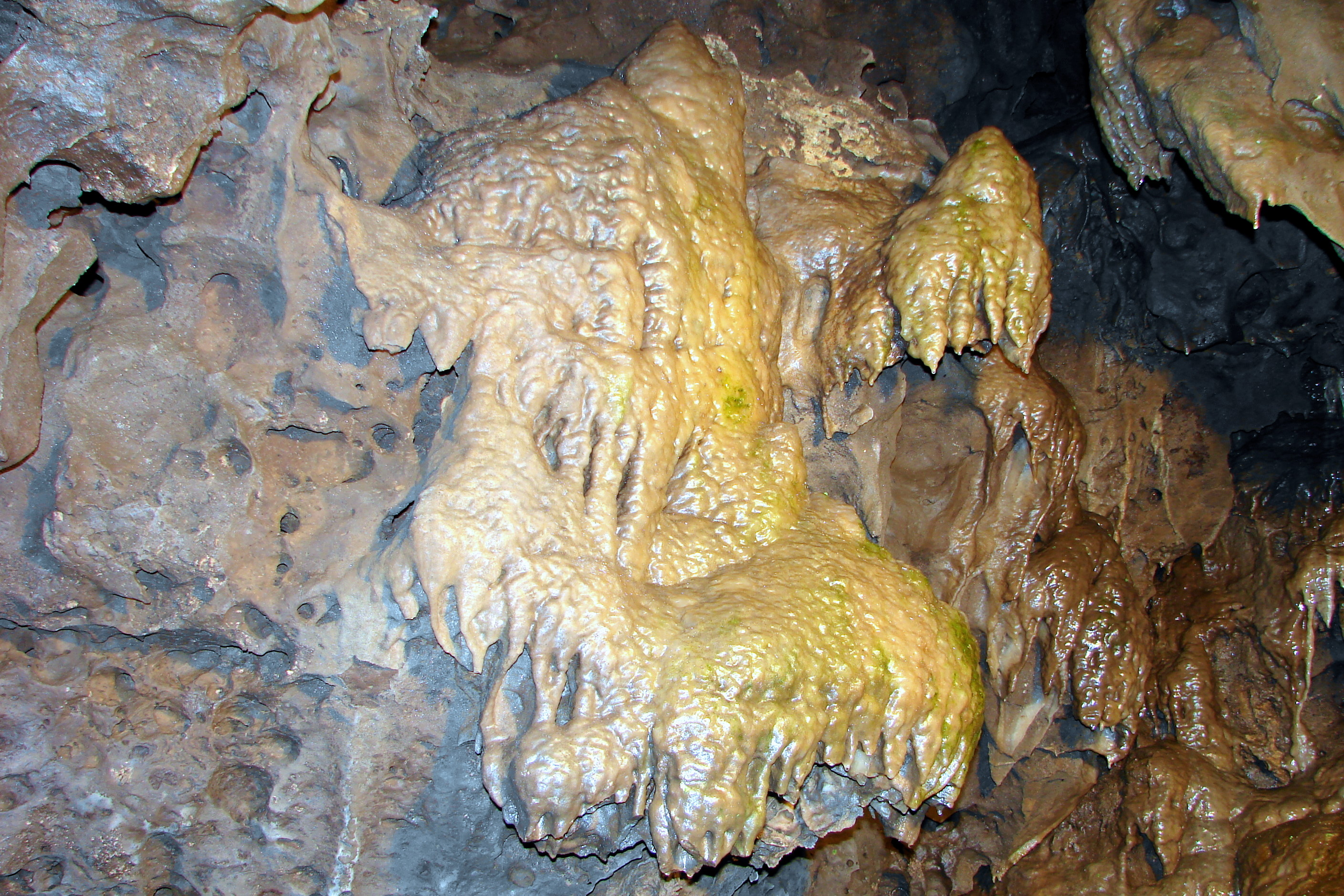
Dripstones at the lowest point

A large part in the development and expansion of the cave from 1894 to 1896 was played by the operator of the mining facility, Steiger Hess from Kittelsthal. An inclined gallery with stairs was created, the current access to the cave, which connects the mining cavities of shafts 1 and 2. In 1895, the first guided tours of the cave took place, and it was ceremoniously opened in 1896 with a sermon on the mountain. Steiger Hess was the first cave guide. The former material building and the washroom of the mining facility were transformed into the restaurant Zur Tropfsteinhöhle. The cave entrance was built over and a ticket office with a lounge and souvenir sale was erected. In the first years of the show cave operation, the cave was illuminated with gas. At the beginning of the 20th century, speleologists were looking for new cavities. In 1918, according to other sources already from 1913/1914, electric lighting with colored lamps was installed in sections and the cave was decorated with green plants and garden gnomes. The lighting was redesigned several times until 1936. The designation of the cave varied until World War II. In the publications of the Thuringian Cave Society it appeared as Thaler Tropfsteinhöhle or Tropfsteinhöhle bei Thal. Since the end of the war it has been called exclusively Kittelsthal Dripstone Cave. The entire show cave and parts of the remaining cave area are located in the Kittelsthal district. In the 1960s, the Eisenach District Council invested 18,000 marks in safety work in the access gallery and in the Big Grotto by the Quent company from Farnroda. In 1954, the guide service, which had been discontinued in 1945, was resumed. A cave guide and a salesperson were employed on an hourly basis. In 1966, the Raimund family sold the cave to the community of Kittelsthal. In the last full year of operation, about 4000 people visited the cave, half of whom were school children. The fee for guided tours from the beginning of June to the end of September was 0.80 Mark for adults and 0.50 Mark for children. In the spring of 1968 there was a mining ceiling. As a result, the cave was closed for safety reasons.

=== Resting phase ===
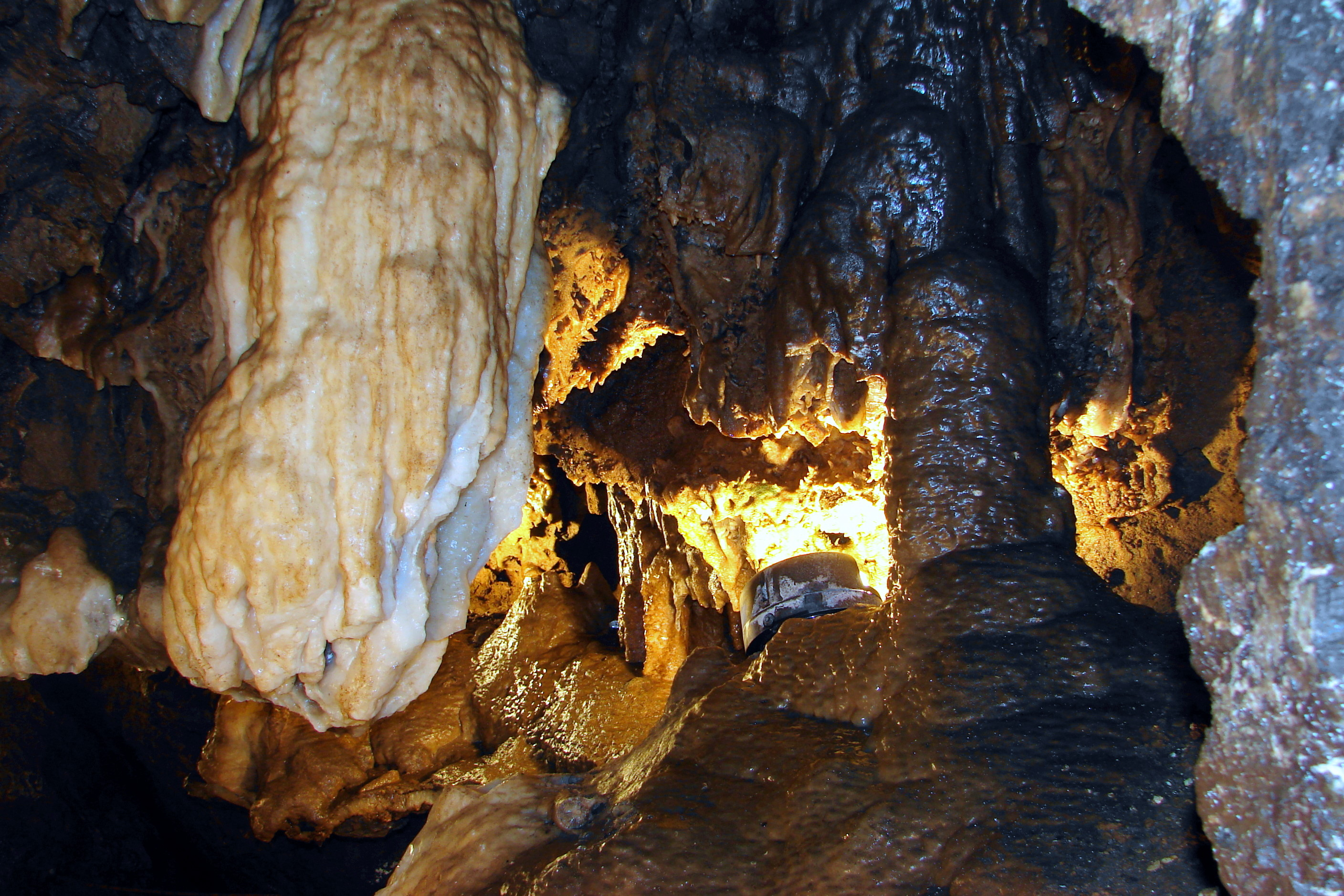
Dripstones at the Drei Gleichen

The fallen ridge section had been in a clay pocket, which may have become loose due to heavy moisture penetration. A crooked steel girder in the Big Grotto, which had also been listed as a reason for closure, had already been deformed when it was brought into the cave. Because the risks were difficult to assess and because of rather low visitor numbers, there was not much interest in continuing show cave operations. In addition, the installation facilities in the cave were in a relatively poor condition. Since no one declared himself responsible for the protection of the cave, there was considerable destruction, for example in the area of the Drei Gleichen, in the Wolfsschlucht and in the Big Grotto. Thus, some of the stalactites were broken off and stolen. In the Big Grotto, the top of the pyramid was cut off. The thief was convicted; the top was recovered and put back on. Water from the ceiling was diverted so that it dripped onto the replaced spire. This should allow for re-growth over time. The cave entrance was closed with a massive door to prevent further destruction. From then on, the cave was accessible only to organized speleologists. A longer period of research began in the cave. Still in 1968, the Suhler Grotto had been discovered in the course of the investigations because of the danger of the cave. This could be reached through a several meters wide, but only 0.5 meters high sinkhole. The speleologists E. Roscher and V. Nemitz discovered the Schlammgrotte on October 3, 1971. Subsequently, with an extension of 50 by 12 and an average height of 10 meters, the largest room, the Saal der Titanen, and in its perimeter other rooms, including the Lehmdom, were discovered. The Kittelsthal Cave Research Group, founded in December 1975, continued the research in the cave. The last major discovery was in 1981, the Silbermanngrotte with the Kristallsee, the only small body of water in the cave.

=== Securing work ===
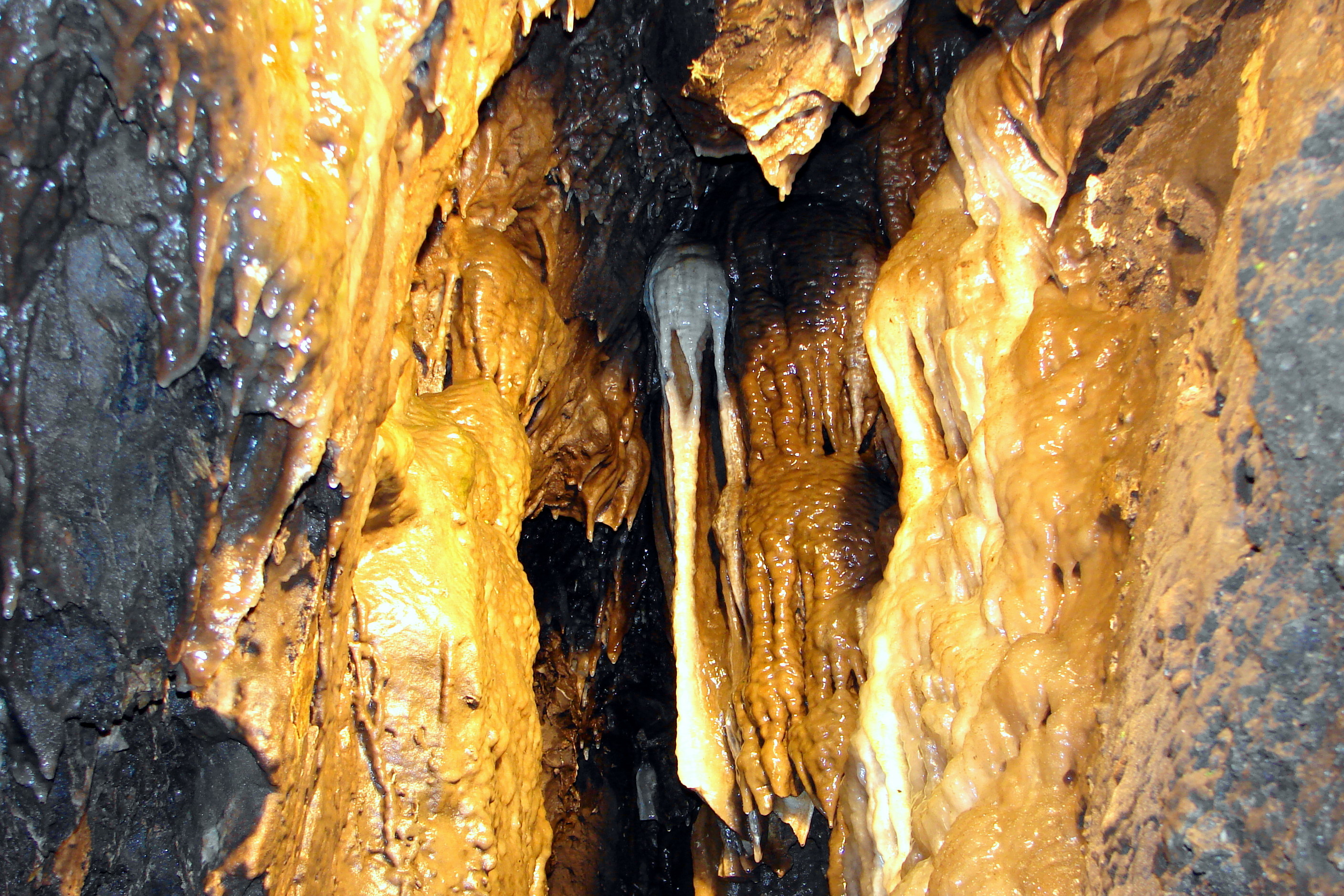
Gerberkammer

Over time, the wooden stairs in the entrance gallery and the electrical installation deteriorated. In order to counteract further deterioration of the cave, Bergsicherung Ilfeld carried out safety measures in the cave and the mining sections above it from 1980 onwards, after a mining section collapsed right next to the cave restaurant. Some of the old shafts were excavated; the accessible parts of the old galleries and mining areas were filled in. Concrete seals were placed in the ridge area of the Big Grotto and the access gallery. At a fissure in Shaft I, a large rock slab came loose and was secured with anchor bolts. In the vicinity of the cave, other old mining facilities were backfilled or their entrance areas were secured. The securing work was completed in 1990.

=== Reopening ===
After the ten years of securing work and the German reunification, the municipality intended to reopen the show cave as its biggest attraction. The restoration of the cave began on May 2, 1991 with ABM workers and small financial resources. A new concrete staircase was poured in the access tunnel, the ascent and descent were secured with railings, and grit was applied to the cave passages. The old entrance house and the cavers' accommodation were demolished, and the entrance area was partially leveled. A bungalow built by the mining safety department now serves as accommodation for the cave guides and as a ticket office. Dirt that had fallen in due to open mining shafts was removed and the old cave lighting was replaced. The cave walls were cleared of clay, and since then the baryte and sinter surfaces have shone in new splendor. The cave was reopened with a ceremony on September 11, 1992, after the work was completed. From 1992 to 2019, Kittelsthal Dripstone Cave was open continuously from April to October. Due to the Corona pandemic as well as the retirement of the cave guide for health reasons, the cave was closed from November 1, 2019 to October 2, 2022. The ceremonial reopening of Kittelsthal Dripstone Cave took place on October 3, 2022.

== Geology ==
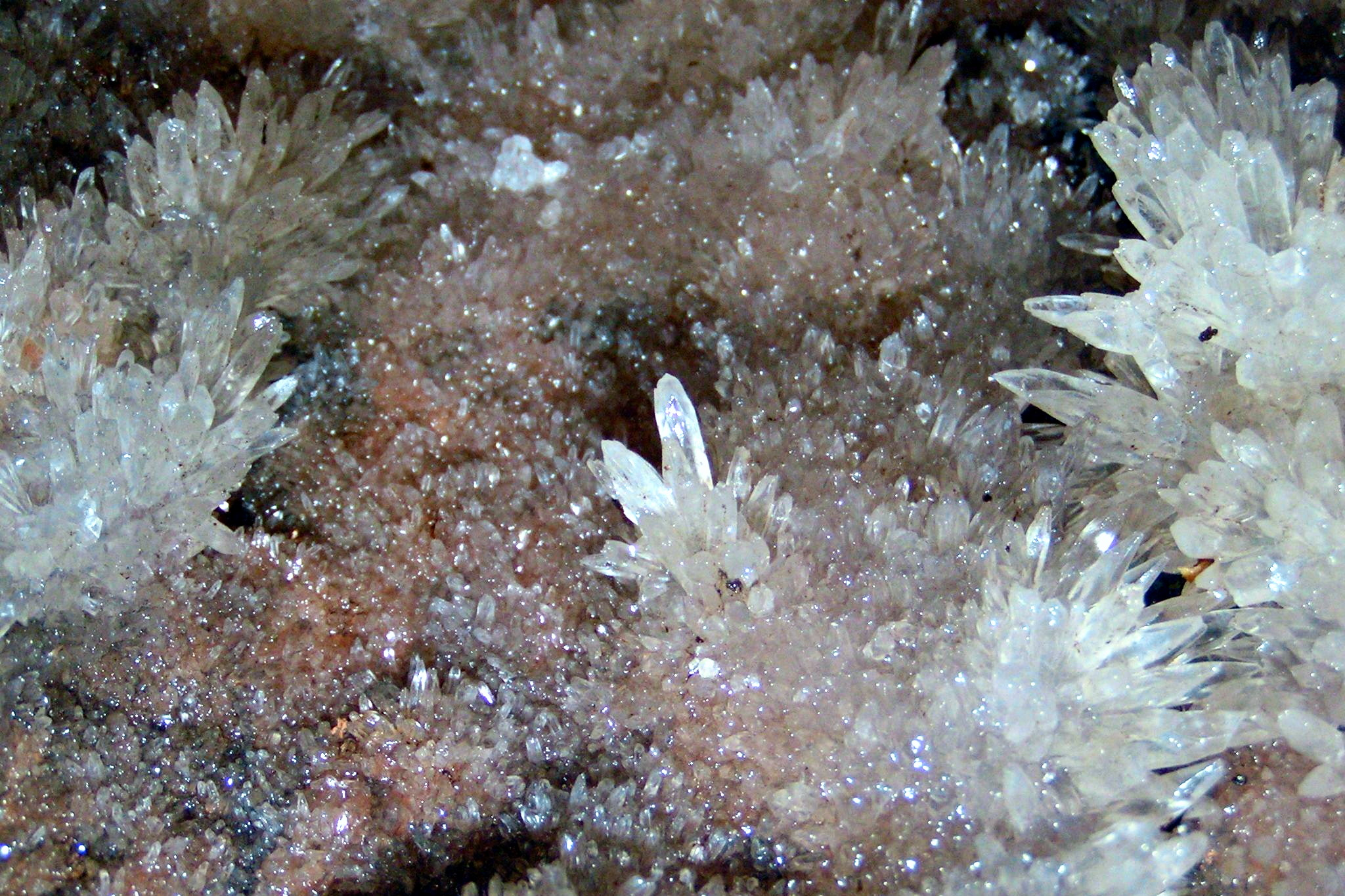
Lime crystals in the Gerberkammer

The cave is located in the Thal-Kittelsthal karst complex, a former Zechstein reef. This region was in a threshold position at the beginning of the Zechstein period; Thuringia was covered by the Zechstein Sea, which had only a shallow water depth in this threshold region. In these shallow water areas, favored by the climatic conditions, many calcareous coral reef found a habitat. These reef-builders died off under increasingly inhospitable living conditions and were gradually covered by sediments of the higher Zechstein. The Thuringian Forest was uplifted by Saxonian fracture block tectonics; to a lesser extent this also affected areas of the foreland such as the Kittelsthal region, parts of which were later eroded again. This provided favorable conditions for karstification. Water sank over fissures and ponors in the reef complex and the dripstone caves began to form. In larger cavities, the dissolution of the limestone by carbonic acid formed stalactites, stalagmites and stalagnates of various sizes and shapes. In the cave there are also sporadic eccentrics, sideways or upward curved outgrowths of a few centimeters in length, independent of gravity.

=== Guideway ===
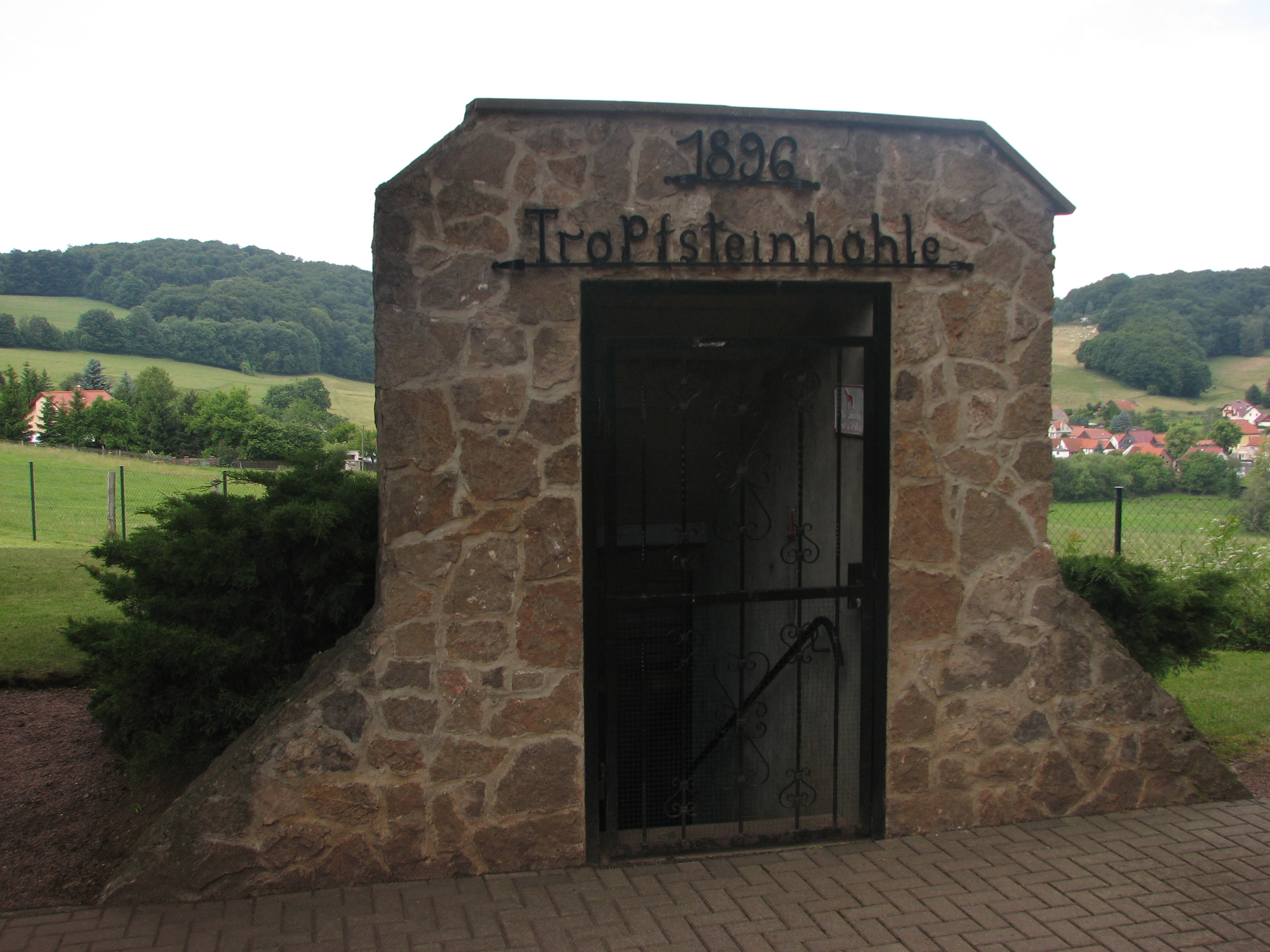
Entrance to the Show Cave

A sloping tunnel about 90 meters long leads through old mining parts through which the dripstone cave was discovered. Via 87 steps it goes down to a small platform. Above this is an 18 meter high shaft that led to the open air. For safety reasons, it was sealed with a concrete seal by the mining safety department. Through this shaft, the mined barite was probably conveyed into the mine workings by means of a niddy-noddy. Further down, after about 20 meters, follows the narrowest part of the old mine workings. Here, the barite vein has a thickness of only 0.30 meters, with the adit being barely man-high. Since no mining had been profitable in this area, the passage was only created with the development of the show cave. Further down, large bright white barite areas can be seen on the walls, especially on the right buttress. These mining cavities belong to Shaft II of the mine. There, numerous black limestone fragments are contained in the barite.

After another 40 meters through quite narrow passages, the first natural cavity is reached at a depth of 40 meters, the Big Grotto. There, the approximately 80 meter thick barite passage, which has been mined far beyond the cavity, forms the northern boundary of the room. The grotto is about 10 by 12 meters in size and 5 meters high. Above an artificial lake of only a few square meters to the right of the entrance to the Big Grotto are sections of intensely corroded limestone. The pyramid in the western part of the cavity is one of the most beautiful dripstones in the cave. It reaches a height of about 3.5 meters. In the southern part of the Big Grotto there is a walled concrete pillar and a steel girder to secure it. A wooden bracing and a concrete seal above the grotto are intended to protect against incoming material from Shaft III, the main haulage shaft of the old mine.

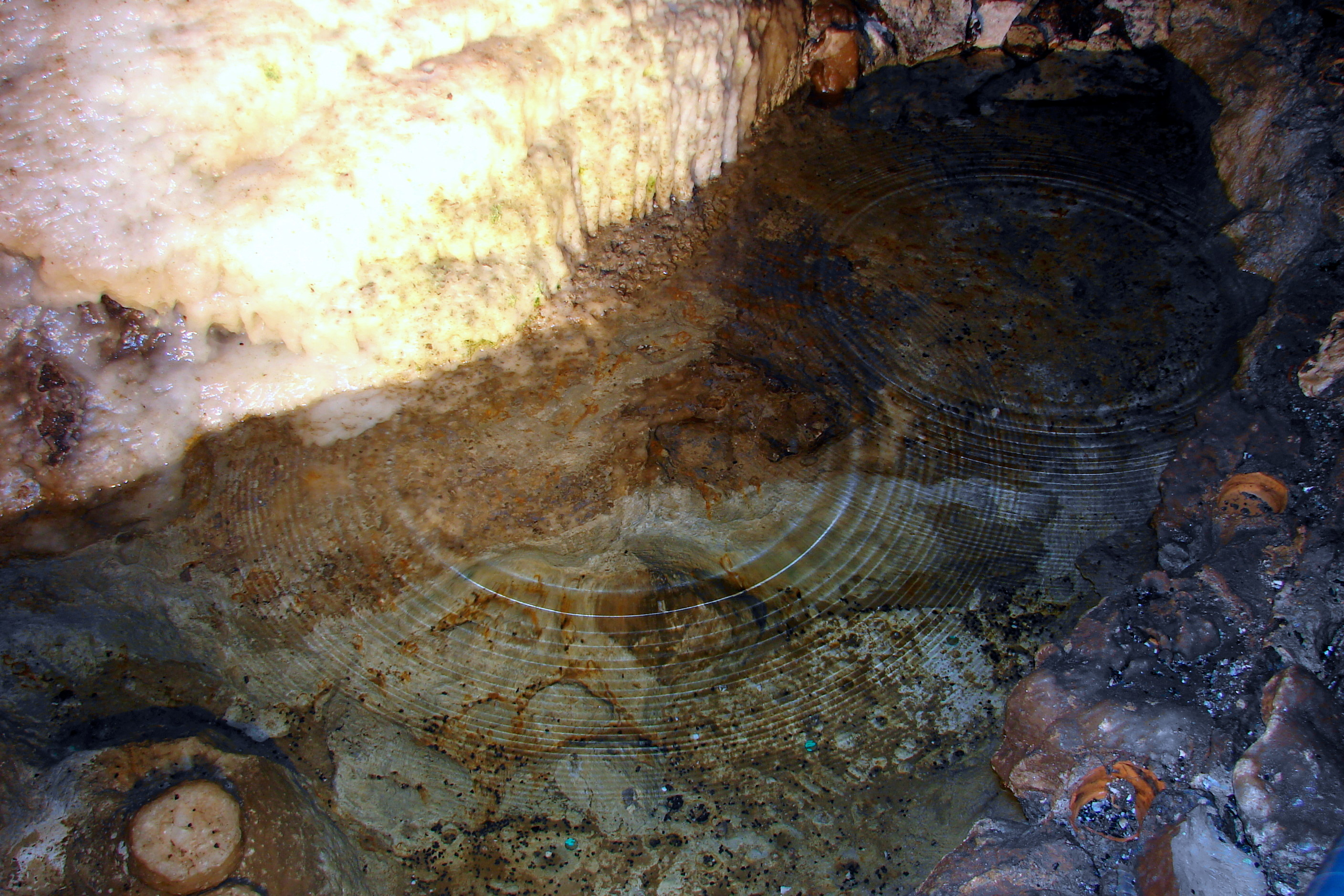
Water pool in the Big Grotto

From the Big Grotto, descend a few steps to the Drei Gleichen area. Of the stalactites that give the cave its name, only stumps remain, as they fell victim to vandalism before the cave was closed. Massive, coarsely crystalline sinter surfaces and several small eccentrics hidden in wall niches can be seen. These grow seemingly without any regularity, even against gravity, in all directions and are often strangely curved. Chemically they are identical with the dripstones. Further steps lead to the Domgrotte, an elongated cavity, in the ridge area of which the baryte passage is visible again, which was left for a short time. There, besides the barite, there are also yellowish to greenish fluorite crystals, maximum one centimeter thick. The fluorite dissolves much faster than the barite, that's why partly only the negatives of the crystals are left. In the rear part of the cathedral grotto there is the tanning chamber with numerous corrosion forms on the walls, which are due to the chemical dissolution of the limestone by the cave waters. The further continuation of the cave in this area is filled with clay. There, 48 meters below the earth's surface, the deepest point of the show cave section is reached.

On the way back, we enter the Wolfsschlucht, the only known cavity of the cave north of the baryte passage. The floor is covered by several fracture blocks, which close a possible continuation of the cave. In addition to sinter formations on the cavity walls, dark brown limestones, thin bands and single crystals of baryte are present. This is due to the different solubility of calcite and barite. The walls are also covered with millimeter thick calcite turf, some of which is water clear. From there, the entrance path leads back to the cave entrance.

=== New cave parts ===
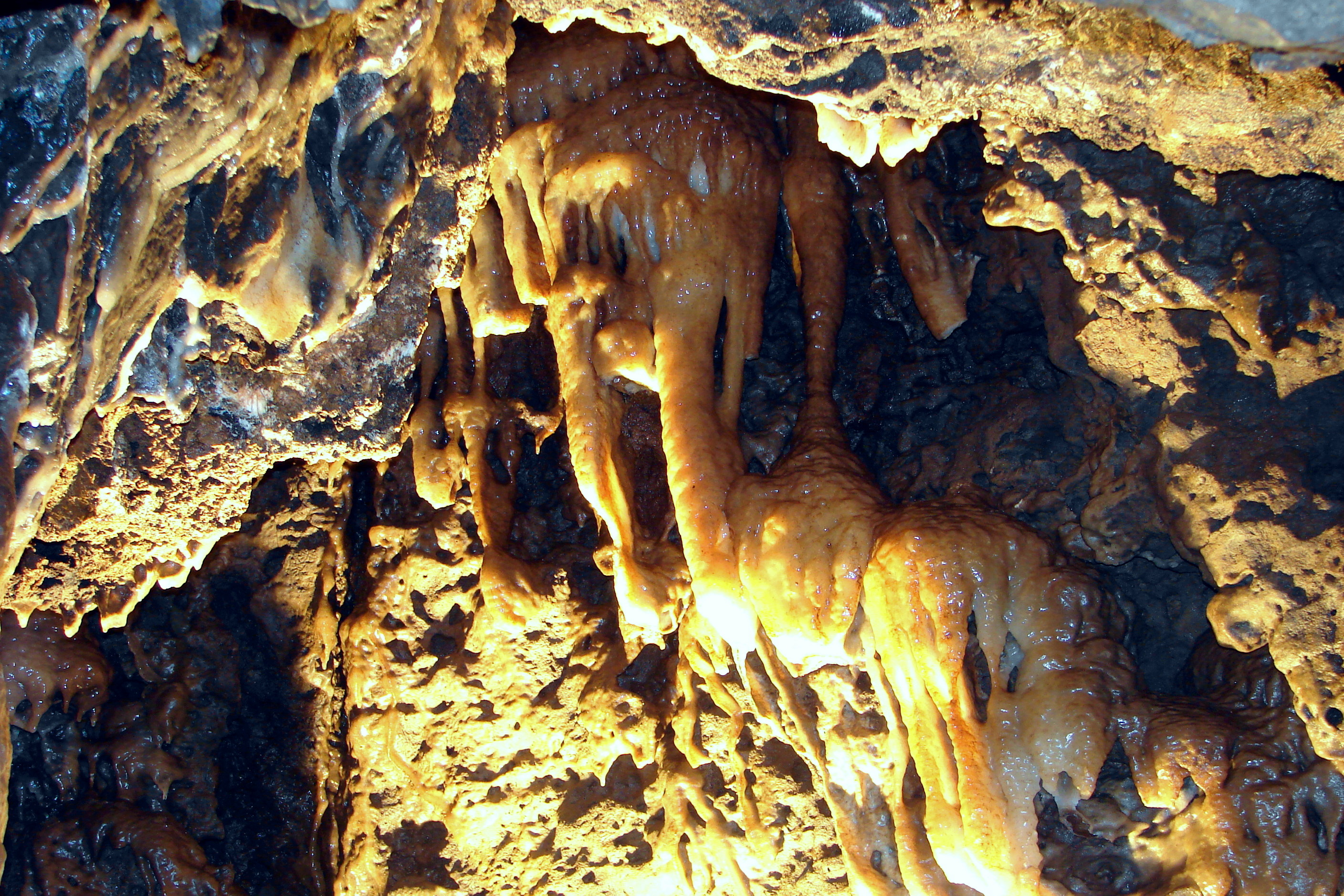
Dripstones at the Drei Gleichen

In the southern part of the Big Grotto, a passage leads to the Saal der Titanen, discovered in 1971, which is not visited during guided tours. It is partially covered with huge blocks of debris. To the west, there is a rock block measuring about 18 by 32 meters and about 10 meters high, which has detached from the ceiling. Its mass is estimated at about 13,500 tons. The Saal der Titanen, together with the subsidence joint created by the lowering of the block, has an area of about 1600 square meters. The rock block is still in minor movement due to the presence of numerous fresh cracks in sintered surfaces and broken stalagnates between the block and the ceiling. There are other cavities in the vicinity of the great hall. The quantity and beauty of the stalactites in these parts of the cave sometimes surpass those accessible during guided tours. The fact that these stalactites are hardly destroyed is due to the fact that very few people enter these parts of the cave. The largest stalactite in this area is the so-called Möhre, a stalactite with a length of 2.5 meters. The largest sinter curtain is about 4 meters long. Due to financial constraints, the development of these parts of the cave is currently not possible, since, among other things, a tunnel would have to be blasted through the rock and extensive safety measures would be necessary.

== Fauna and Flora ==
=== Fauna ===
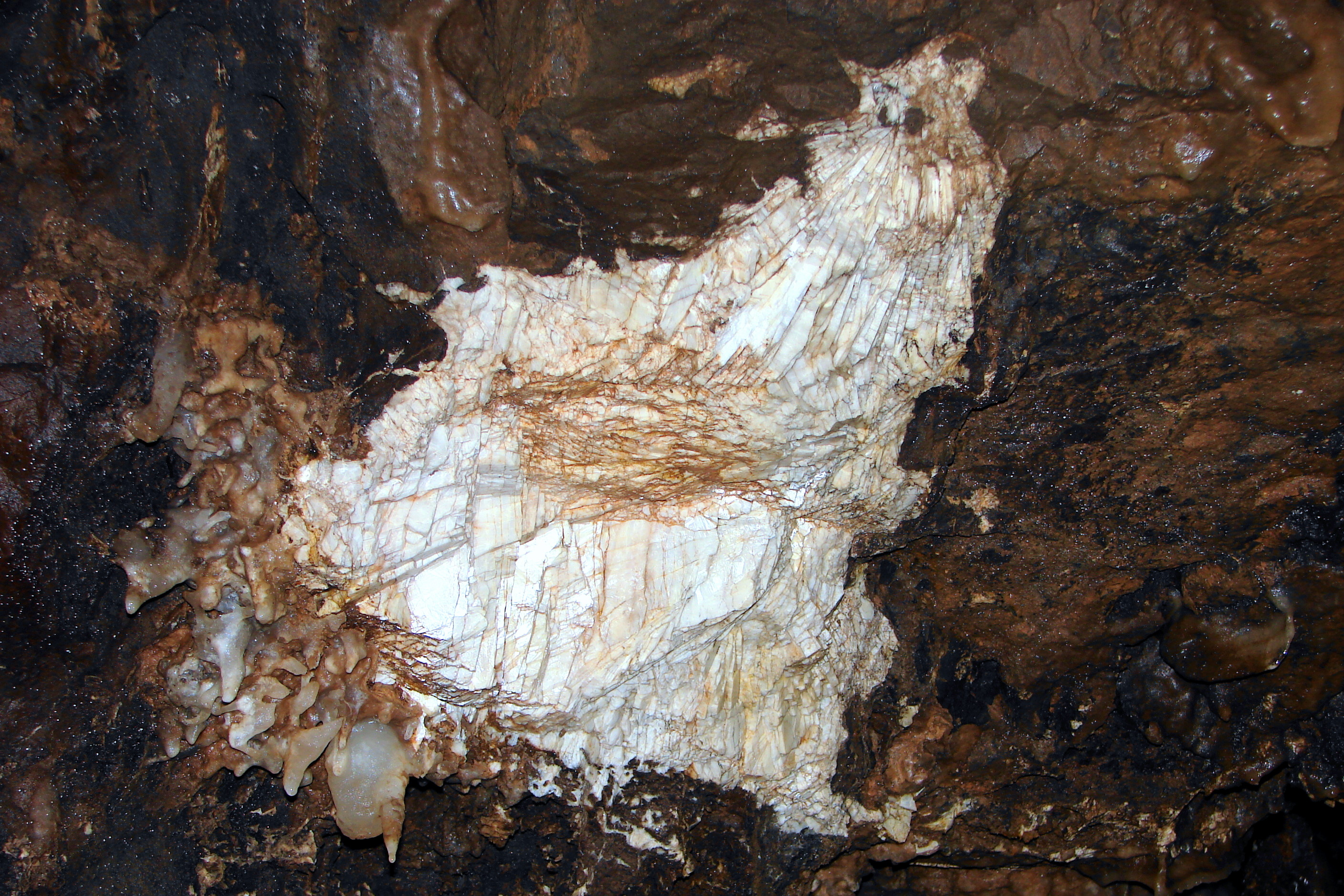
Barite at the Drei Gleichen

The cave fauna was investigated in 2001 by Ronald Bellstedt and Stefan Zaenker. Numerous records of worms, spiders, insects (including beetles, bipeds and butterflies) and other arthropods were found, indicating a great diversity of species.

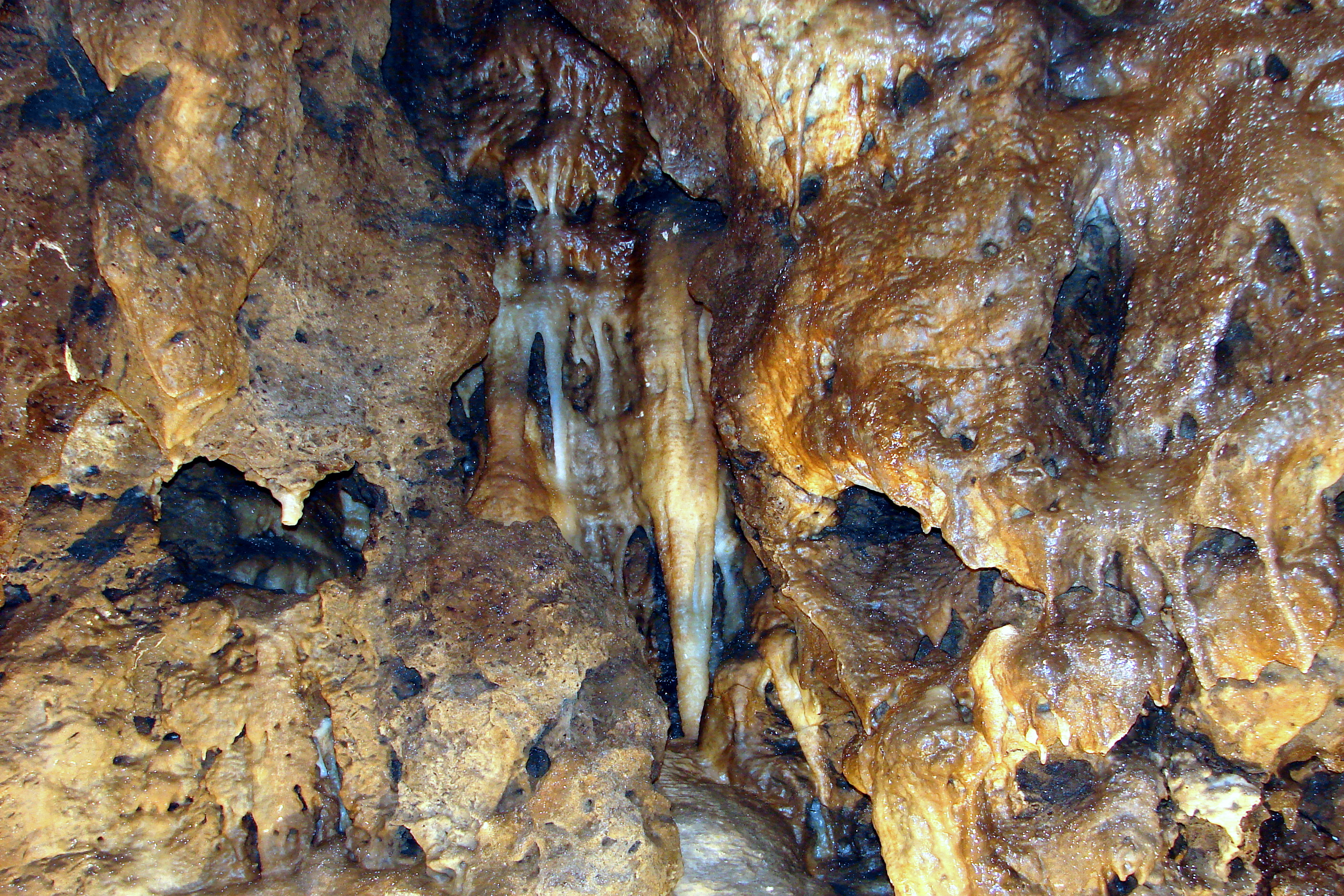
Dripstones above the water basin

Spiders are found preferentially in the entrance and transition areas, such as the troglophilous species Lepthyphantes pallidus from the Linyphiidae and Nesticus cellulanus, a cave spider. Permanent cave dwellers have adapted to the conditions there. They are blind and pigmentless like the cave isopod (Proasellus cavaticus) or the well shrimps (Niphargus). Eyeless springtails (Collembola) are also found in the cave.

Among the two-winged midge species (Diptera), a fungus gnat species found only in the area, which was identified by Frank Menzel in 1990, deserves special mention. In summer, the Limoniidae Limonia nubeculosa occurs, furthermore, mosquito species from the families of fungus gnats (Mycetophilidae), butterfly gnats (Psychodidae), fungus gnats (Sciaridae) and winter gnats (Trichoceridae) show up. In flies, species from the families of dung flies (Sphaeroceridae) and caddisflies (Trichoptera) were noted. Among butterfly species, there are the cave moth (Triphosa dubitata) and the Herald (moth) (Scoliopteryx libatrix).

Various species of microbats hibernate in the cave, such as the greater mouse-eared bat (Myotis myotis) and the whiskered bat (Myotis mystacinus).

=== Lampenflora ===
In the Kittelsthal Dripstone Cave, a distinctive plant community known as lampenflora has developed in the light of the lamps. In the area of the light sources mainly algae, mosses, fungi and fern plants settle. These are mostly stunted forms that could not survive in absolute darkness without artificial lighting. The plants are not evenly distributed. It depends on which spores enter the cave with the leachate from the earth's surface through fissures. Cave visitors also contribute to the distribution of plants. In some cave areas, little or no lamp flora could develop due to drought conditions.

== Tourism ==
Since the reopening of the Dripstone Cave on October 3, 2022, guided tours are held from April through October on Thursdays and Fridays from 10 am - 6 pm and Saturdays, Sundays & holidays from 1 pm - 6 pm and from March through November on Thursdays through Saturdays from 10 am - 6 pm. Group tours are available by appointment on Wednesdays throughout the year. The cave is not accessible without a guided tour. The route leads along easily accessible paths into the individual parts of the cave, past the stalactite formations. There are 228 steps to reach a depth of over 48 meters, covering a distance of 158 meters. The temperature in the cave is constantly about eleven degrees Celsius with a humidity of over 95 percent.

In 1993, the first after the reopening, 10,242 people visited the cave. After that, the number of visitors decreased and leveled off at 4000 to 6000 annually. In 2012, 4795 people visited the cave. Since the reopening of the cave, approximately 109,000 people visited the cave through 2012. From 2008 to 2012, the average number of visitors was 4954, putting it in the lower range of show caves in Germany.

== See also ==
- List of show caves in Germany
- List of caves

== Bibliography ==
- Klaus & Anita Schöllhorn, G. Malcher (2006), Stadtverwaltung Ruhla (ed.), Die Kittelsthaler Tropfsteinhöhle (4. überarbeitete ed.), Ruhla: Verlag + Druckerei Löhr, Ruhla 2006.
- Redaktion Ina Pustal, Textbeitrag Ronald Bellstedt et al.: . Hrsg.: Thüringer Landesanstalt für Umwelt und Geologie, Jena. Druckhaus Gera, Gera 2005, ISBN 3-9806811-4-9
- Geyer; Jahne; Storch (1999), Landratsamt Wartburgkreis, Untere Naturschutzbehörde (ed.), "Geologische Sehenswürdigkeiten des Wartburgkreises und der kreisfreien Stadt Eisenach", Naturschutz im Wartburgkreis, vol. Heft 8, Eisenach und Bad Salzungen: Druck- und Verlagshaus Frisch
- Hans Binder, Anke Lutz, Hans Martin Lutz: Schauhöhlen in Deutschland. Hrsg. v. Aegis Verlag, Ulm 1993 ISBN 3-87005-040-3
- Stephan Kempe Welt voller Geheimnisse – Höhlen. Reihe: HB Bildatlas Sonderausgabe. Hrsg. v. HB Verlags- und Vertriebs-Gesellschaft, 1997 ISBN 3-616-06739-1
