= Hörsel =

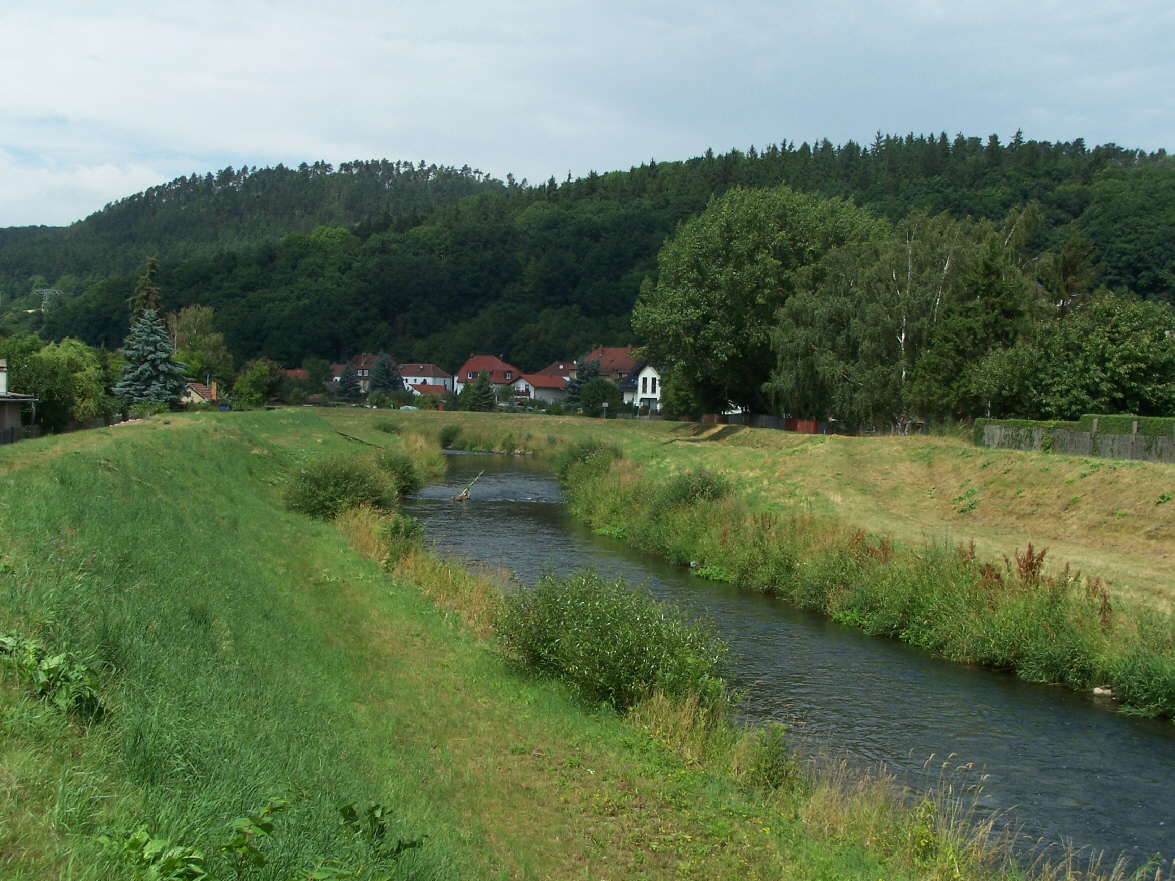
- The river Hörsel

Location
- Country: Germany

Physical characteristics
- Source
  - location: Thuringian Forest
- Mouth
  - location: Werra
  - coordinates: 51°0′30″N 10°13′45″E
- Length: 56 km (35 mi)

Basin features
- Progression: Werra→ Weser→ North Sea

The Hörsel (German pronunciation: [ˈhœʁzl̩]) is a 56 km (35 mi) long river in Thuringia, Germany, right tributary of the Werra. It is formed by the confluence of two smaller rivers in Leinatal, at the northern edge of the Thuringian Forest. The Hörsel flows generally northwest through the towns Hörselgau, Wutha-Farnroda and Eisenach. It flows into the Werra in Hörschel, a village near Eisenach.

== Course ==
As with many rivers, the name of the middle and lower reaches of the Hörsel was only extended to the upper reaches in the 20th century.

=== Kleine Leina und (Wilde) Leina ===
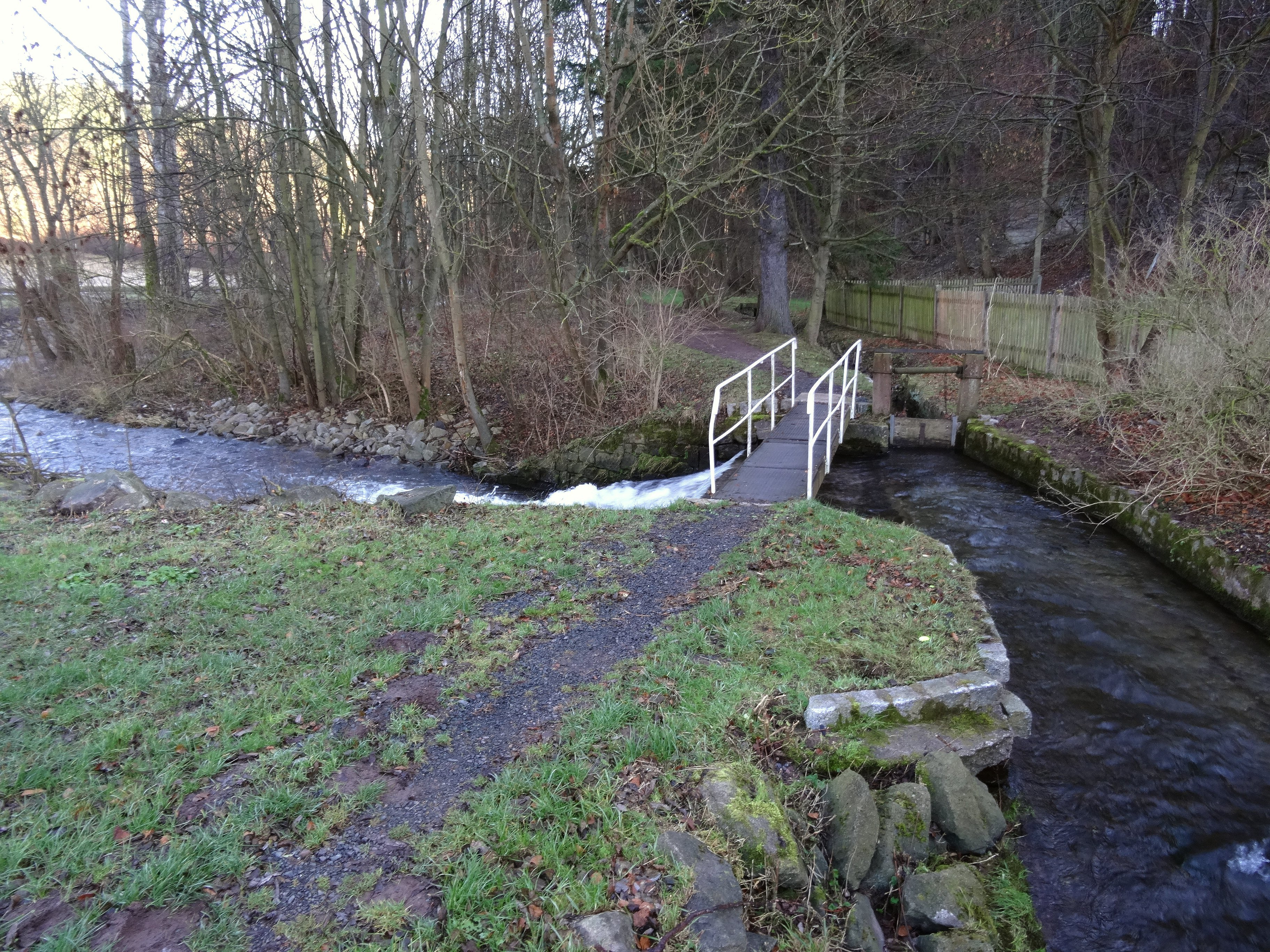
branch of the Leina Channel between Engelsbach and Schönau v. d. Walde

The Hörsel has its source as Kleine Leina in the Thuringian Forest in the immediate vicinity of the Rennsteig south of the 749 metre high Spießberga at the southern community border of Finsterbergen to Georgenthal. (both district of Gotha). The stream flows first to the northeast and passes different parts of Georgenthal.

After 8.4 kilometers of flow distance in the district Schönau vor dem Walde the Leinakanal branches off to the right. Shortly after, streams flow in from both sides. From Schönau vor dem Walde the small river turns to the north. In maps from the beginning of the 20th century the name Wilde Leina is written here. After the inflow of the Cumbach from Cumbach the name Leina-Hörsel. In the further course to the north the Schilfwasser coming from Ernstroda flows in from the left.

=== Hörsel ===
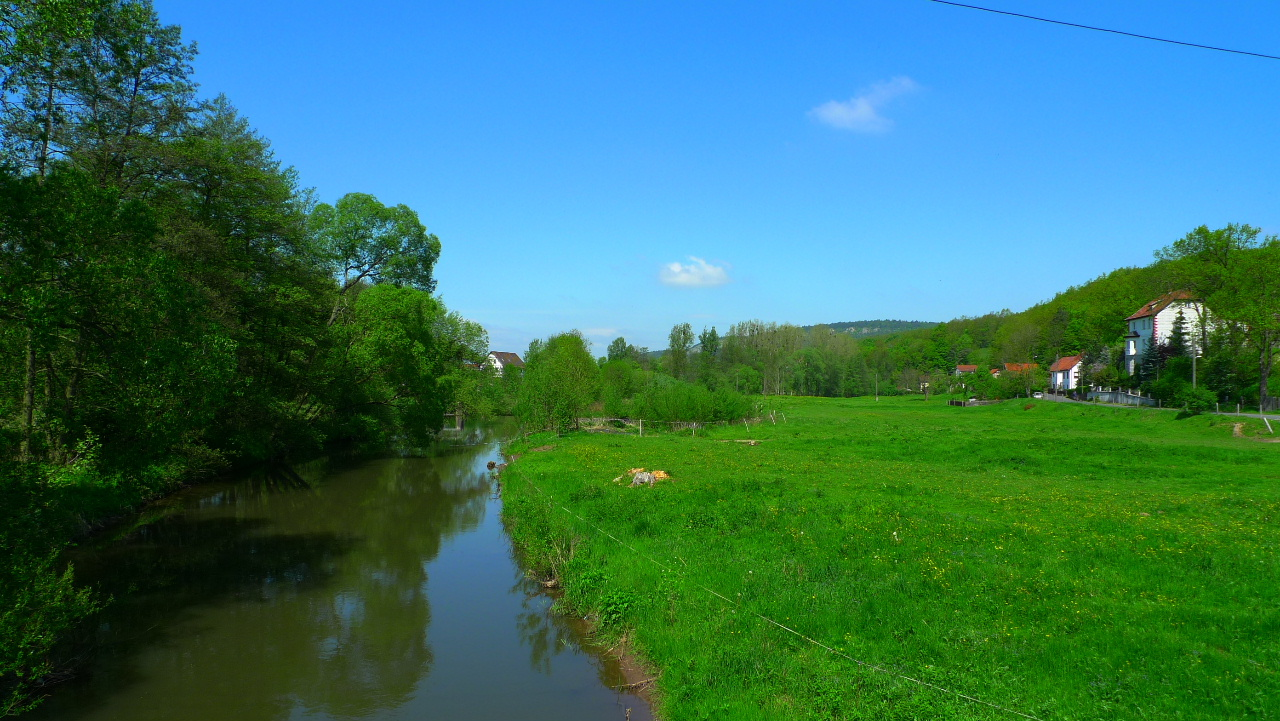
The Hörselaue in Schönau (Wutha-Farnroda)

In Leinatal-Leina after 16.3 kilometres with the inflow of the Altenwasser (also: Altes Wasser, from right) the name Leina ends completely. From here the river is called Hörsel and its course turns to the northwest.

In Wahlwinkel and Hörselgau the Badewasser flows in two arms from left. After passing Fröttstädt, the Asse flows into Teutleben from the right. The Hörsel takes over the direction of flow to the west and, after the inflow of the Laucha, the Asse flows into the Laucha. Mechterstädt

When reaching the Wartburgkreises the river crosses under the Bundesautobahn 4, flows south past the Hörselbergen through the communities Hörselberg-Hainich (district Sättelstädt with the left-sided tributary Emse) and Wutha-Farnroda, where the Erbstrom flows into Wutha from the left.

Then the Hörsel reaches Eisenach, where it takes in from the right the approximately equally strong Nesse and the much smaller Michelsbach, from the left the Löbersbach and the Roten Bach. Further west, in the Eisenach district of Hörschel - - the place of origin of the Rennsteigs - is its estuary (waters) into the Werra.

The total length of the river "Kleine Leina-Hörsel" is 48.5 km, over the 52.6 km long Nesse the Hörsel is even about 62 km long.

== Tributaries ==
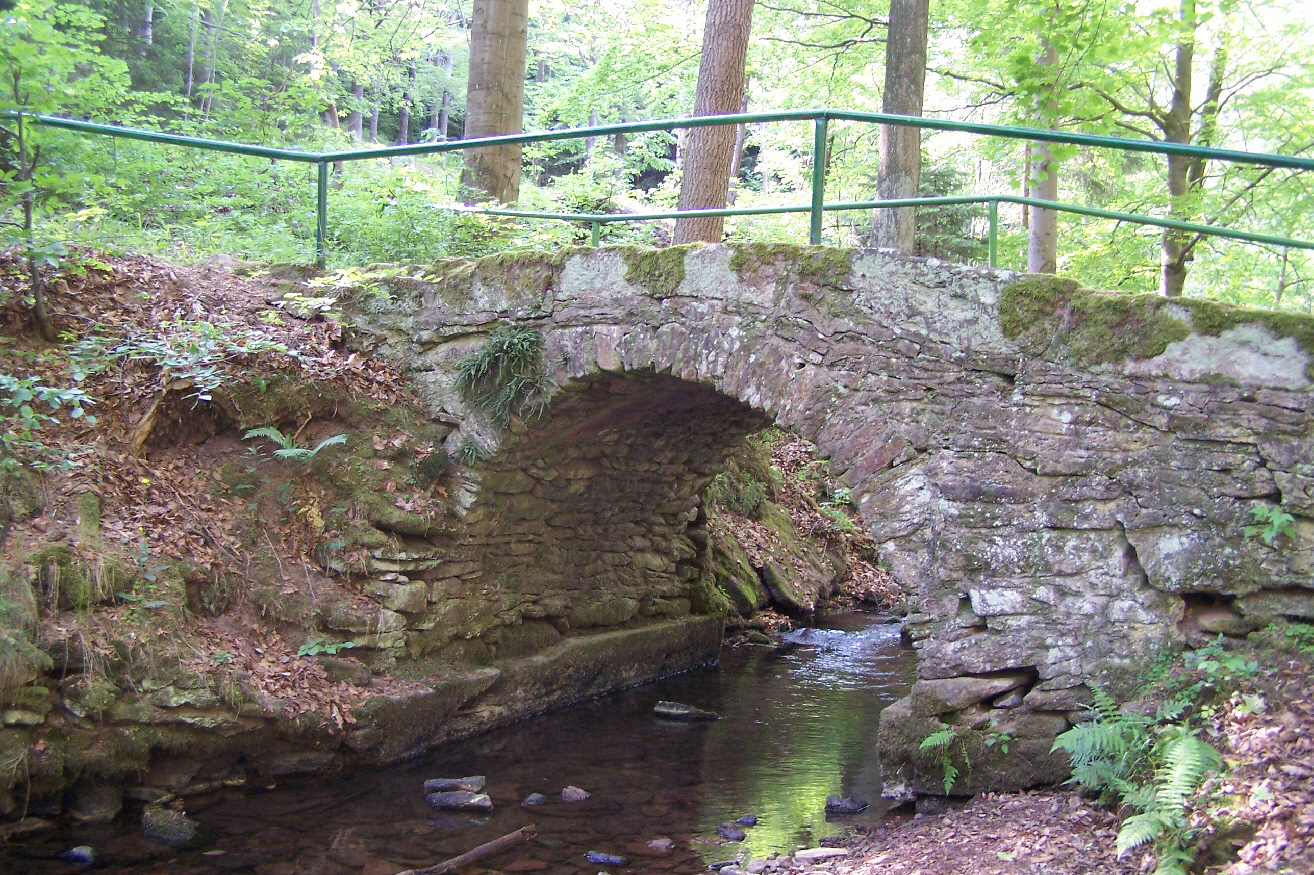
The so-called Bridge Totenbrücke over the Leina (Finsterbergen)

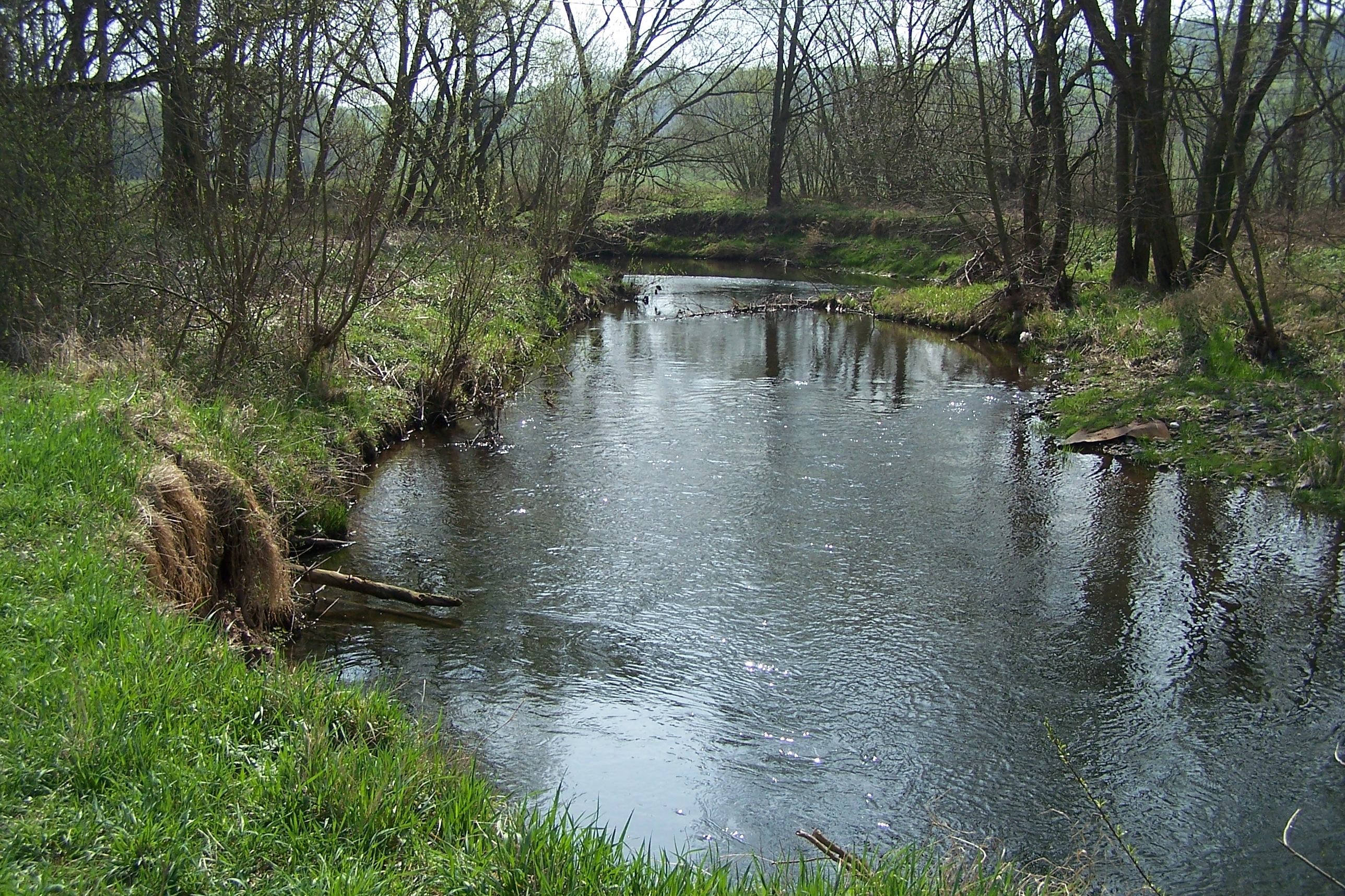
The Hörsel near Eisenach

The catchment area of the Hörsel is divided into two major landscapes. The headwaters Leina and left tributaries come from the Thuringian Forest, while all right tributaries come from the Thuringian Basin and its edge plates. Correspondingly, the upper reaches of the left tributaries are typical low mountain streams with deep gorges and a large bottom gradient, while the right tributaries are mostly lowland rivers with a small gradient, almost all of them flowing into the Hörsel via the Nesse. Today, their courses are mostly straightened and integrated into a system of drainage ditches.

The catchment area of the Nesse comprises 426.3 km^{2}, 54.4% of the total catchment area of the Hörsel and 139.5% of the Hörsel catchment area above the Nesse estuary (305.6 km^{2}). Thus, the Nesse brings about the same amount of water (3.14 m^{2}/s) to unite with the Hörsel as the Hörsel itself (3.11 m^{2}/s).

A pipeline from the Leina - and the (upper) Apfelstädt from the system Gera/Unstrut/Saale/Elbe - to the subsystem of the Nesse is the Leinakanal, which was already built in the Middle Ages to supply the city Gotha with water from the Thuringian Forest. The flow distance of the Hörsel over the upper reaches of the Leina, the Leina Canal, the Wilden Graben from the Leina Canal, the Nesse (middle and lower reaches) and the Hörsel Lower reaches is 8.4 + 29.5 + 9.8 + 26.0 = 73.3 km.

name	inflow- side	length [km]	catchment area [km^{2}]	Mouth elevation [m. above NN]	Mouth location (*: near)	DGKZ
Großer Frosch	left	2.1		514		416-11?
Rösenbach	left	2.1		458	above Finsterbergen	416-11?
Körnsbergwasser	left	2.9	3.1	440	under Finsterbergen	416-11?
Sulzbach	right	1.8		390	Engelsbach	416-11?
Schilfwasser	left	11.2	14.3	338	Ernstroda*	416-12
Cumbach	left	3.9	7.3	326	Cumbach*	416-1?
Altenwasser	right	7.3	8.5	317	Leina	416-1?
Badewasser	left	10.7	24.1	302	Wahlwinkel	416-2
Dormbach	right	4.8		294	Fröttstädt	416-31?
Asse (Hörsel)	right	6.0	14.2	287	Teutleben	416-32
Laucha	left	13.9	30.4	277	Laucha*	416-4
Suelzenbach	left	4.2		273	Mechterstädt	416-51?
Nußbach	right	2.7		262	Hörselberg-Hainich-Burla*	416-51?
Emse	left	14.2	42.2	260	Sättelstädt	416-52
Deubach.	left	3.9		247	Wutha-Farnroda-Schönau	416-5?
Burbach	right	1.4		240	Wutha-Farnroda-Kahlenberg	416-5?
Erbstrom	left	13.7	58.4	234	Wutha-Farnroda	416-6
Fischbach	left	3.5	3.1	228	Rothenhof (Eisenach-Ost)	416-72
Nesse	right	54.5	426.3	215	Eisenach	416-8
Löbersbach	left	5.8			Eisenach	416-91?
Roter Bach	left	5.4			Eisenach	416-94?
Rauchenbach	left	2.8			Industrial area Eisenach-West	416-95?
Borntal	left	3.8	3.9		Stedtfeld	416-96

== See also ==
- List of rivers of Thuringia
