= Wutha station =

Railway station in Thuringia, Germany

Wutha
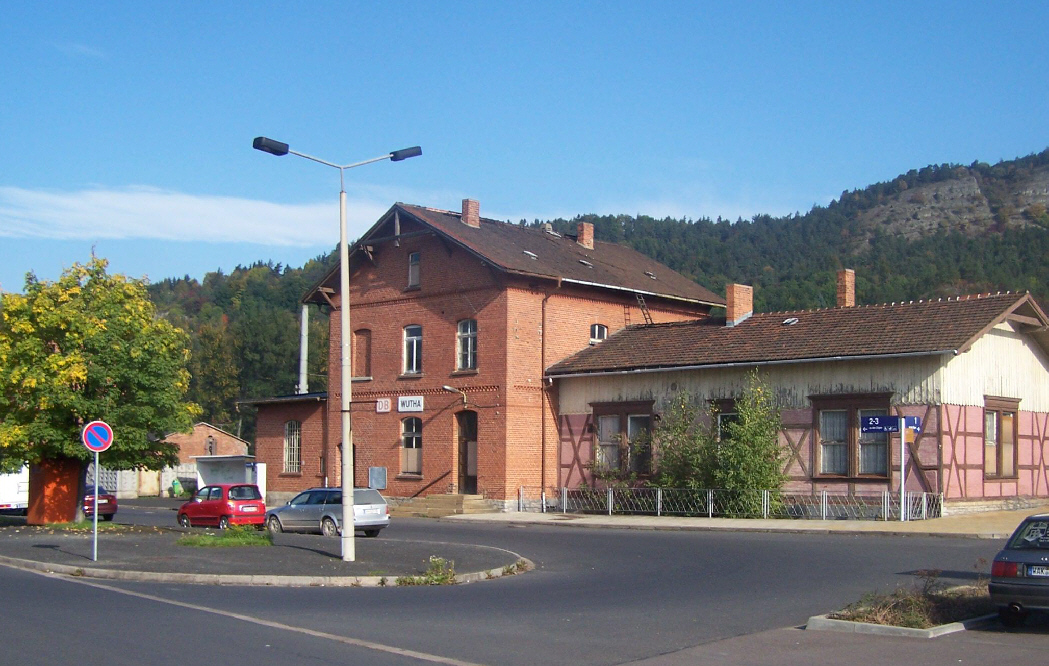
- Entrance building

General information
- Location: Bahnhofsplatz 1, Wutha, Wutha-Farnroda, Thuringia; Germany
- Coordinates: 50°57′26″N 10°23′48″E
- Owner: Deutsche Bahn
- Operator: DB Station&Service
- Lines: Halle–Bebra railway; Wutha–Ruhla railway (closed)
- Platforms: 3

Construction
- Accessible: Yes

Other information
- Station code: 6963
- DS100 code: UWU
- IBNR: 8013366
- Category: 6
- Website: www.bahnhof.de

History
- Opened: 1854

Services
Preceding station	Abellio Rail Mitteldeutschland	Following station
Eisenach Terminus	RB 20	Schönau (Hörsel) towards Leipzig Hbf
Location
- Location within Thuringia Location within Germany Location within Europe

Wutha station is a through station on the Halle–Bebra railway in the town of Wutha, part of the municipality of Wutha-Farnroda in the German state of Thuringia. It was opened on 1854 and Deutsche Bahn assigns it to category 6.

== History ==
It was not until 1854 that a halt (Haltestelle) was established for the municipality of Wutha on the Halle–Bebra railway (Thuringian Railway), which had opened in 1847. It originally had a "house" and an island platform, as well as a waiting room built by the municipality. In 1873, this building was replaced by an entrance building built by the Thuringian Railway Company (Thüringische Eisenbahn-Gesellschaft). As a result of the construction of the Wutha–Ruhla railway, the halt was reclassified as a station in 1879/80 and a freight shed and a loading road were built. With the opening of a branch line, which was known as the Rühler Bimmel ("Ruhla jingle"), the station became a Keilbahnhof ("wedge station", that is, it had a platform built between the diverging lines). Following the closure of the Rühler Bimmel on 24 September 1967, the station maintained its operational importance, as an industrial spur ran from it and the Eisenach freight yard had to be relieved of traffic as a result of its increasing motor car loading operations.

To the east of Wutha station, there were already at this time the loading ramps of the VEB Petkus Wutha. This plant mainly exported technical facilities for seed cleaning and grain silos to other Communist countries. For this purpose, a roofed goods handling building was built. Further east was the ACZ Wutha agrochemical centre, which was founded in the 1970s, with several feed and fertiliser storage halls. The storage and timber loading yard of the Eisenach state forestry company (Staatlicher Forstbetrieb Eisenach), which had its own loading bridge for long logs, took up even more space.

After 1980, intensive preparations took place in the residential areas for the building of prefabricated flats in the Mölmen estate on the outskirts of Wutha-Farnroda and in the Am Stein and Friedrich-Engels-Straße estates in Seebach. The transport of all industrially prefabricated panels took place exclusively via the industrial spur line from Wutha. A central concrete plant was built at Rehhof and supplied with cement, sand and gravel from the Bad Salzungen area. To the east of Rehhof, a lignite-powered heating plant was built for the district heating supply of Wutha and Seebach; this was also supplied by rail.

Until the introduction of ticket machines in 1994, Wutha entrance building was used to its full extent. There were office and lounge rooms for rail staff in the building and on the ground floor, there was a ticket office, a waiting room and a busy station restaurant.

On 6 June 2004, a display of local culture was opened at Eisenacher Straße, near the town hall. It provides detailed information about Wutha station and the Wutha–Ruhla railway on three display boards. Visitors can also inspect original parts and structural remains of the Erbstrom bridge.

== Platforms ==
The platforms and heights are as follows:

Platform	Length in m	Height in cm
1	135	38
2	147	38
3	147	38

== Services ==
Wutha station is served hourly by the regional service RB 20 (Eisenach – Wutha – Gotha – Erfurt – Weimar – Naumburg – Leipzig).
