= Laucha =

Laucha may refer to the following places in Germany:

- Laucha an der Unstrut, a town in the Burgenlandkreis, Saxony-Anhalt
- Laucha, Thuringia, a municipality in the district of Gotha, Thuringia
- Laucha (Hörsel), a river of Thuringia, tributary of the Hörsel
