= Laucha (Hörsel) =

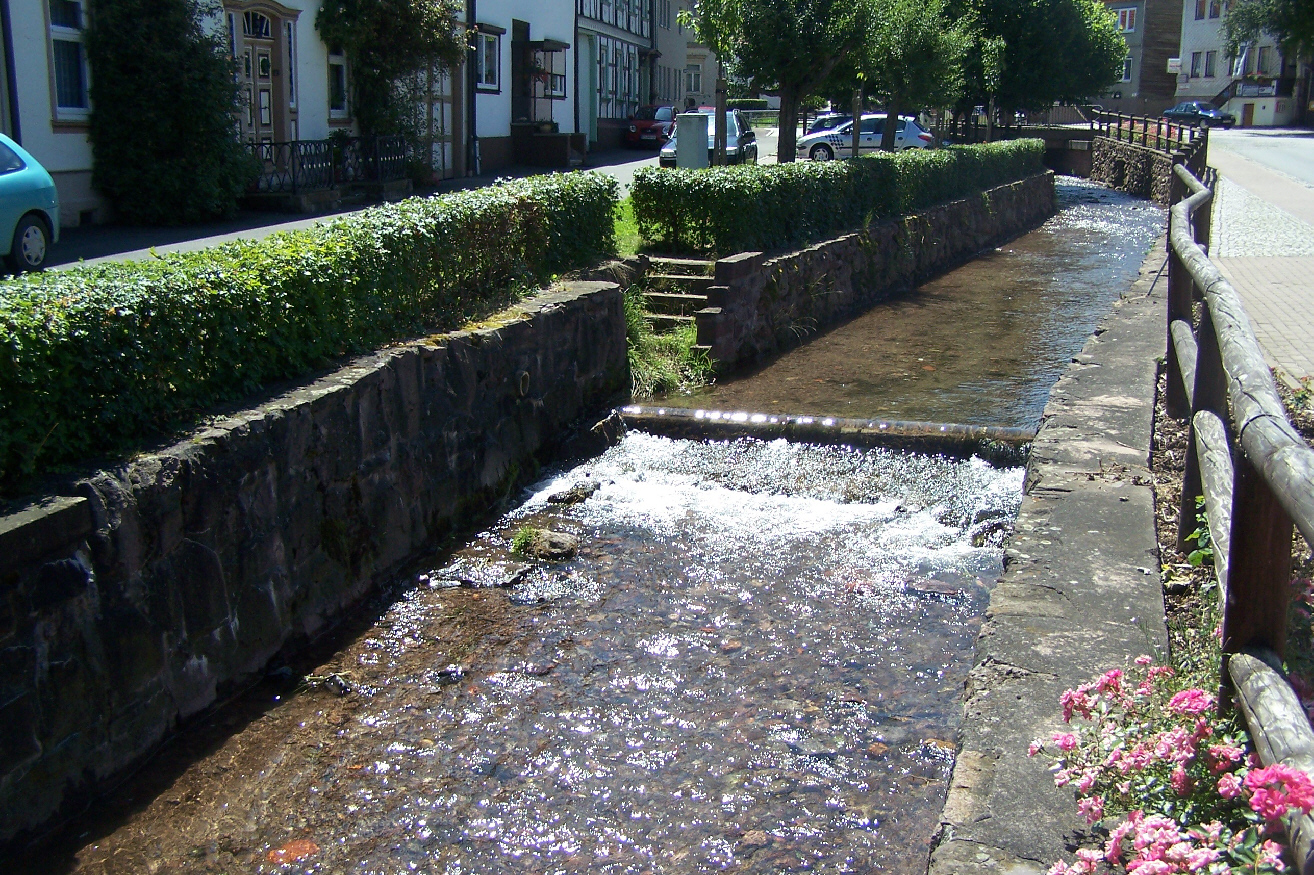

Location
- Country: Germany
- States: Thuringia

Physical characteristics
- Mouth
  - location: Hörsel
  - coordinates: 50.9417°N 10.5390°E

Basin features
- Progression: Hörsel→ Werra→ Weser→ North Sea

Laucha (German pronunciation: [ˈlaʊxa]) is a river of Thuringia, Germany. It flows into the Hörsel near Mechterstädt.

== Name ==
The river was first recorded in 1039 as super rivulum Louchaha.

The original hydronym Lauchaha is thought to have been derived from the leek plant. The municipality of Laucha takes its name from the river. In a work by August Beck, the stream was referred to as Louffa in 1868.

== See also ==
- List of rivers of Thuringia
