= Weingarten, Thuringia =

Weingarten
- Ortsteil of Hörsel
- Interactive map of Weingarten
- Location within Germany Location within Thuringia
- Coordinates: 50°58′27″N 10°32′20″E
- Country: Germany
- State: Thuringia
- District: Gotha
- Municipality: Hörsel

Area
  - Total: 4.02 km^{2} (1.55 sq mi)
- Elevation: 350 m (1,150 ft)

Population (2010-12-31)
  - Total: 157
  - Density: 39.1/km^{2} (101/sq mi)
- Time zone: UTC+01:00 (CET)
  - Summer (DST): UTC+02:00 (CEST)
- Postal codes: 99869
- Dialling codes: 03622

Weingarten (German pronunciation: [ˈvaɪnɡaʁtn̩]) is a village and a former municipality in the district of Gotha in Thuringia, Germany. Since 1 December 2011, it is part of the municipality Hörsel.

The total area of the Weingarten district is 402 hectares.

== History ==
Within the German Empire (1871–1918), Weingarten was part of Saxe-Coburg and Gotha.
