= Metebach =

- Ortsteil of Hörsel
- Interactive map of Metebach
- Location within Germany Location within Thuringia
- Coordinates: 50°58′13″N 10°36′33″E
- Country: Germany
- State: Thuringia
- District: Gotha
- Municipality: Hörsel

Area
  - Total: 5.63 km^{2} (2.17 sq mi)
- Elevation: 315 m (1,033 ft)

Population (2010-12-31)
  - Total: 185
  - Density: 32.9/km^{2} (85.1/sq mi)
- Time zone: UTC+01:00 (CET)
  - Summer (DST): UTC+02:00 (CEST)
- Postal codes: 99880
- Dialling codes: 03622

Metebach is a village and former municipality in the district of Gotha in Thuringia, Germany. Since 1 December 2011, it is part of the municipality Hörsel. It lies 7 km (4.3 mi) north-west from the district capital, Gotha.

== History ==
Within the German Empire (1871–1918), Metebach was part of Saxe-Coburg and Gotha.
