= Aspach, Thuringia =

Aspach
- Ortsteil of Hörsel
- Interactive map of Aspach
- Location within Germany Location within Thuringia
- Coordinates: 50°57′9″N 10°35′48″E
- Country: Germany
- State: Thuringia
- District: Gotha
- Municipality: Hörsel

Area
  - Total: 5.88 km^{2} (2.27 sq mi)
- Elevation: 320 m (1,050 ft)

Population (2010-12-31)
  - Total: 413
  - Density: 70.2/km^{2} (182/sq mi)
- Time zone: UTC+01:00 (CET)
  - Summer (DST): UTC+02:00 (CEST)
- Postal codes: 99880
- Dialling codes: 03622

Aspach (German pronunciation: [ˈaspax]) is a village and a former municipality in the district of Gotha in Thuringia, Germany. Since 1 December 2011, it is part of the municipality of Hörsel.

== History ==
Within the German Empire (1871–1918), Aspach was part of Saxe-Coburg and Gotha.
