= Trügleben =

- Ortsteil of Hörsel
- Interactive map of Trügleben
- Location within Germany Location within Thuringia
- Coordinates: 50°57′2″N 10°37′52″E
- Country: Germany
- State: Thuringia
- District: Gotha
- Municipality: Hörsel

Area
  - Total: 6.07 km^{2} (2.34 sq mi)
- Elevation: 350 m (1,150 ft)

Population (2010-12-31)
  - Total: 363
  - Density: 59.8/km^{2} (155/sq mi)
- Time zone: UTC+01:00 (CET)
  - Summer (DST): UTC+02:00 (CEST)
- Postal codes: 99880
- Dialling codes: 03621
- Vehicle registration: GTH

Trügleben is a village and a former municipality in the district of Gotha in Thuringia, Germany. Since 1 December 2011, it is part of the municipality Hörsel.

== History ==
Within the German Empire (1871–1918), Trügleben was part of Saxe-Coburg and Gotha.
