= Hörsel, Thuringia =

Hörsel
- Municipality
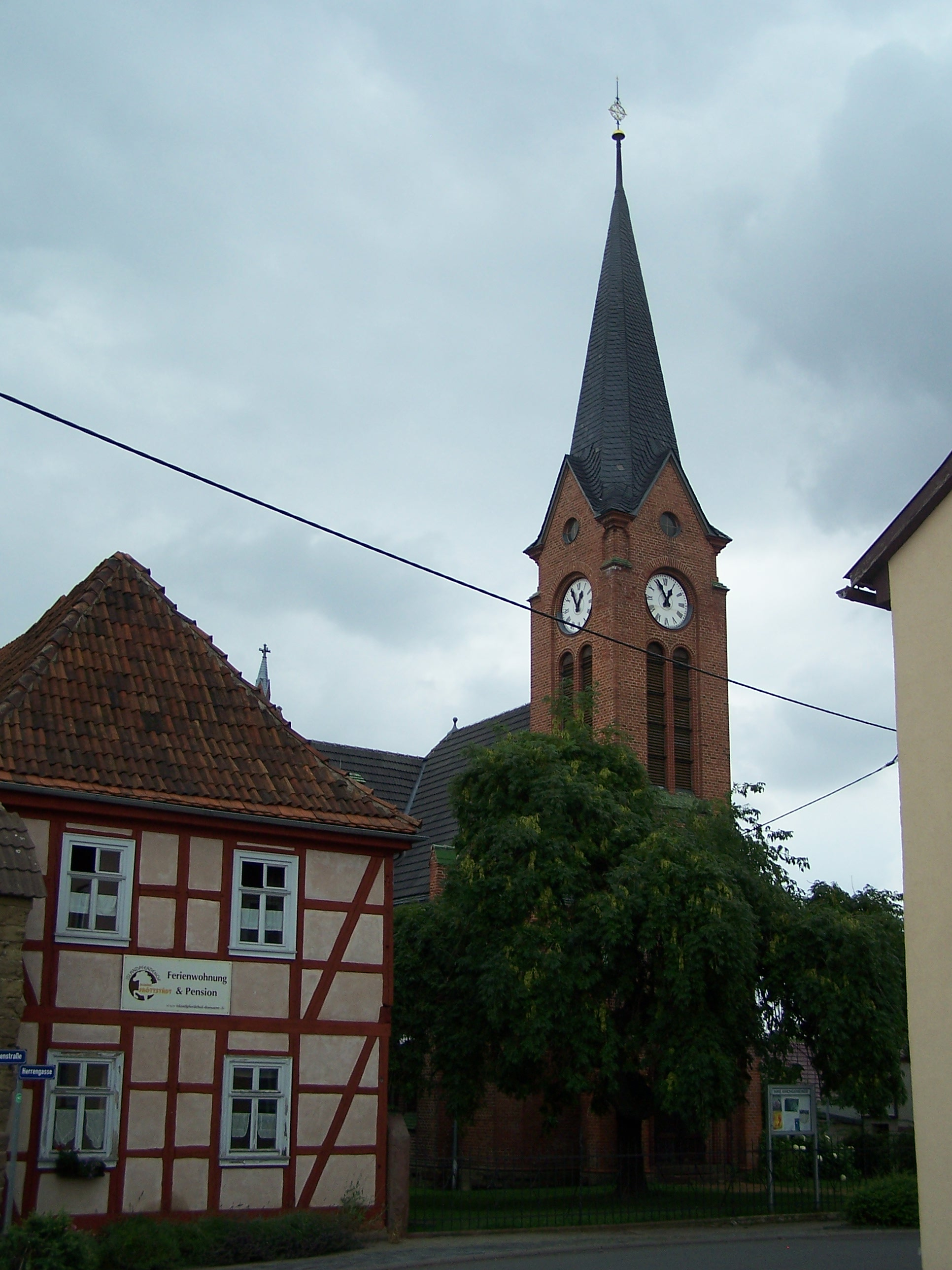

- Location of Hörsel within Gotha district
- Interactive map of Hörsel
- Location within Germany Location within Thuringia
- Coordinates: 50°55′N 10°35′E
- Country: Germany
- State: Thuringia
- District: Gotha

Government
  - Mayor (2023–29): Florian Seitz

Area
  - Total: 70.44 km^{2} (27.20 sq mi)
- Elevation: 300 m (980 ft)

Population (2025-12-31)
  - Total: 4,636
  - Density: 65.81/km^{2} (170.5/sq mi)
- Time zone: UTC+01:00 (CET)
  - Summer (DST): UTC+02:00 (CEST)
- Postal codes: 99880
- Dialling codes: 03622
- Vehicle registration: GTH

Hörsel (German pronunciation: [ˈhœʁzl̩]) is a municipality in the district of Gotha, in Thuringia, Germany. It was named after the river Hörsel, that flows through the municipality. It was formed on 1 December 2011 by the merger of the former municipalities Aspach, Ebenheim, Fröttstädt, Hörselgau, Laucha, Mechterstädt, Metebach, Teutleben, Trügleben and Weingarten. Since March 1994, these municipalities had cooperated in the Verwaltungsgemeinschaft ("collective municipality") Hörsel. This Verwaltungsgemeinschaft was disbanded on 1 December 2011. The seat of the municipality and of the former Verwaltungsgemeinschaft is in Hörselgau.
