= Emse =

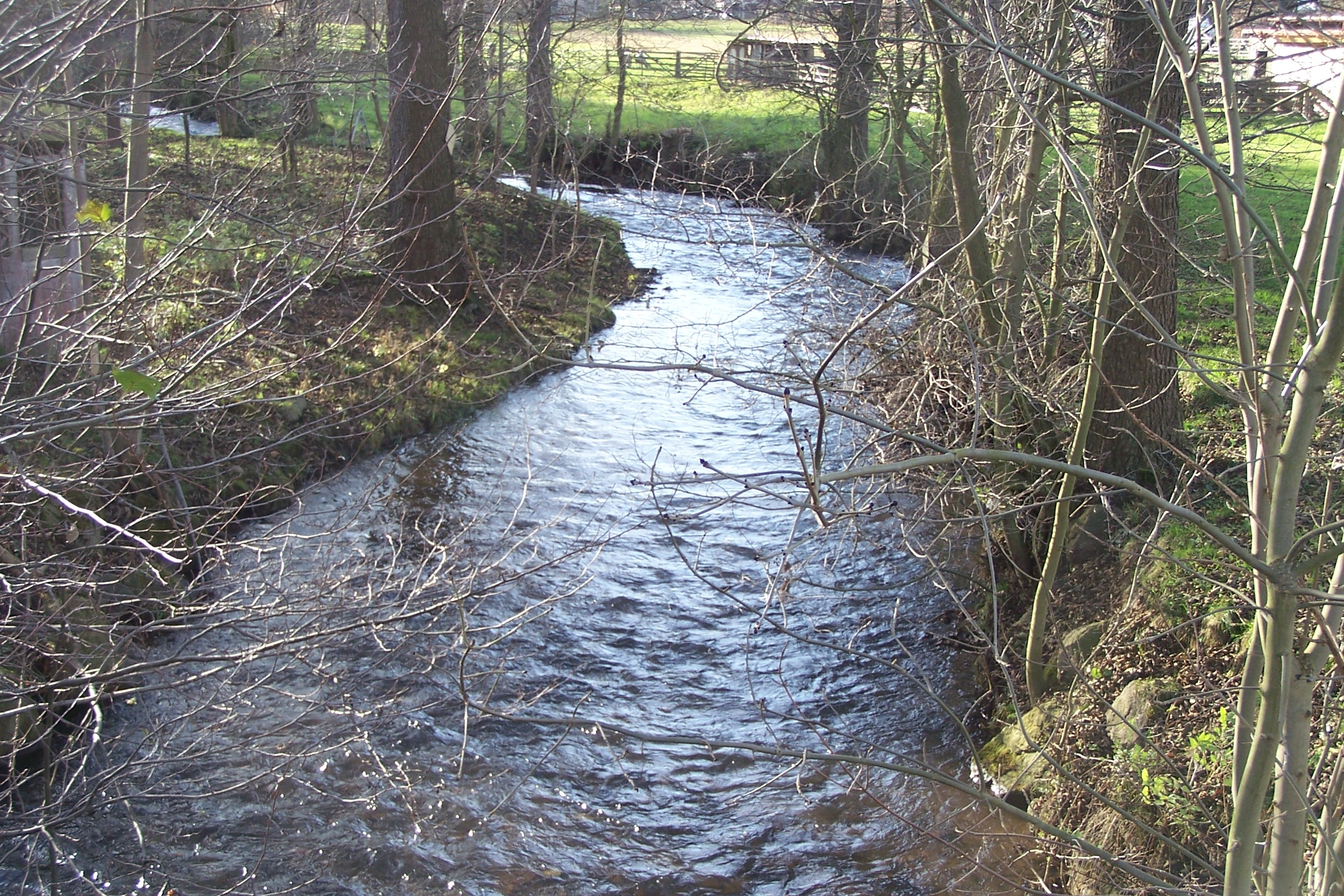

Location
- Country: Germany
- State: Thuringia

Physical characteristics
- Mouth
  - location: Hörsel
  - coordinates: 50°56′43″N 10°29′1″E

Basin features
- Progression: Hörsel→ Werra→ Weser→ North Sea

Emse (German pronunciation: [ˈɛmzə]) is a river of Thuringia, Germany. It is a left tributary of the Hörsel, which it joins in Sättelstädt.

== See also ==
- List of rivers of Thuringia
