= Ebenheim =

- Ortsteil of Hörsel
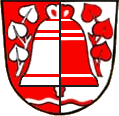
- Coat of arms
- Interactive map of Ebenheim
- Location within Germany Location within Thuringia
- Coordinates: 50°58′N 10°31′E
- Country: Germany
- State: Thuringia
- District: Gotha
- Municipality: Hörsel

Area
  - Total: 6.45 km^{2} (2.49 sq mi)
- Elevation: 335 m (1,099 ft)

Population (2010-12-31)
  - Total: 239
  - Density: 37.1/km^{2} (96.0/sq mi)
- Time zone: UTC+01:00 (CET)
  - Summer (DST): UTC+02:00 (CEST)
- Postal codes: 99869
- Dialling codes: 036254
- Website: www.ebenheim.de

Ebenheim is a village and a former municipality in the district of Gotha in Thuringia, Germany. Since 1 December 2011, it is part of the municipality Hörsel.

== History ==
Within the German Empire (1871–1918), Ebenheim was part of Saxe-Coburg and Gotha.
