= Teutleben =

- Ortsteil of Hörsel
- Interactive map of Teutleben
- Location within Germany Location within Thuringia
- Coordinates: 50°56′43″N 10°33′45″E
- Country: Germany
- State: Thuringia
- District: Gotha
- Municipality: Hörsel

Area
  - Total: 7.82 km^{2} (3.02 sq mi)
- Elevation: 290 m (950 ft)

Population (2010-12-31)
  - Total: 356
  - Density: 45.5/km^{2} (118/sq mi)
- Time zone: UTC+01:00 (CET)
  - Summer (DST): UTC+02:00 (CEST)
- Postal codes: 99880
- Dialling codes: 03622

Teutleben is a village and a former municipality in the district of Gotha in Thuringia, Germany. Since 1 December 2011, it is part of the municipality Hörsel.

== History ==
Within the German Empire (1871–1918), Teutleben was part of Saxe-Coburg and Gotha.
