= Erbstrom =

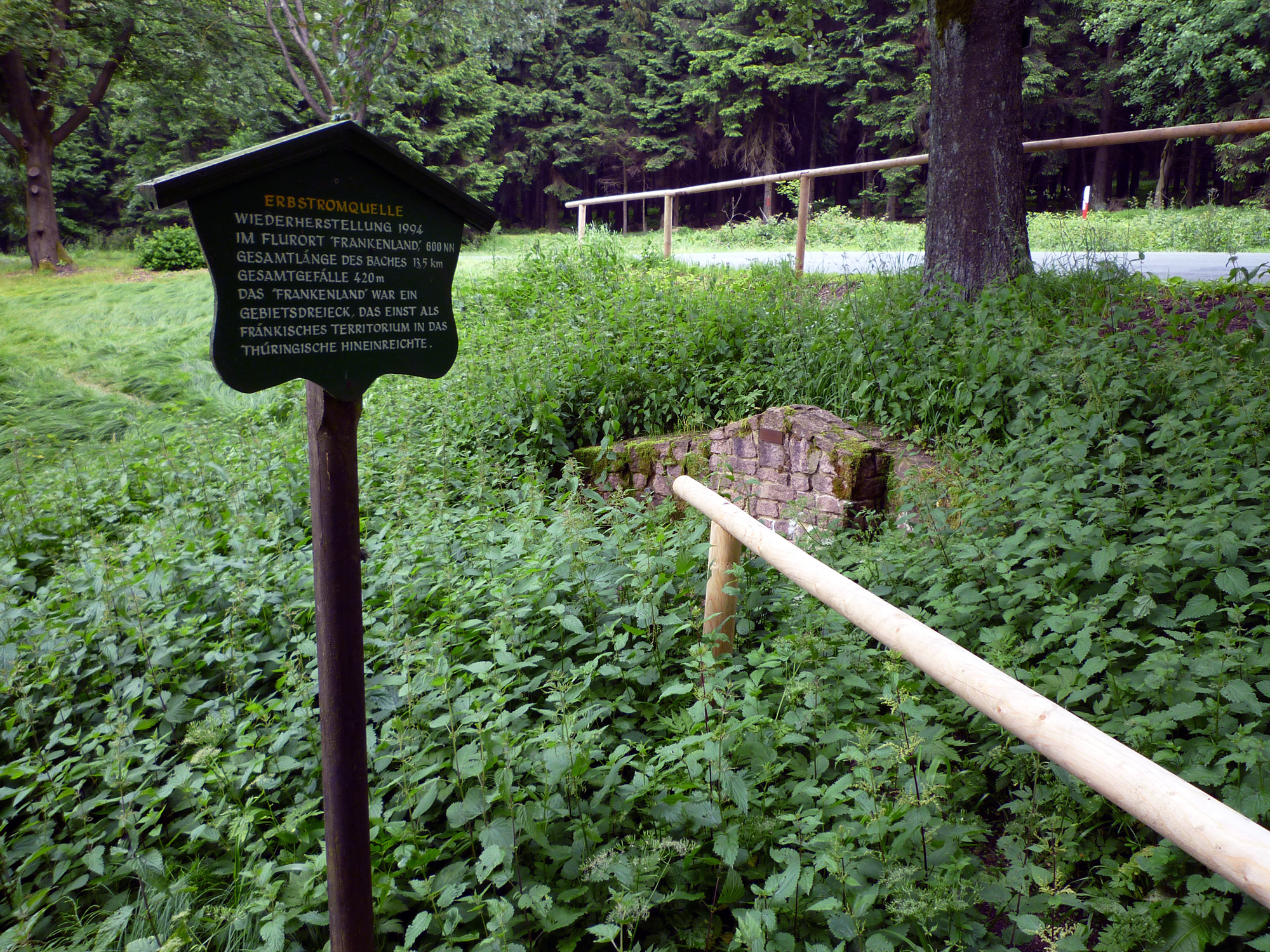

Location
- Country: Germany
- State: Thuringia

Physical characteristics
- Mouth
  - location: Hörsel
  - coordinates: 50.9592°N 10.3951°E

Basin features
- Progression: Hörsel→ Werra→ Weser→ North Sea

Erbstrom is a river of Thuringia, Germany. It flows into the Hörsel in Wutha.

== See also ==
- List of rivers of Thuringia
