= Hörselgau =

- Ortsteil of Hörsel
- Coat of arms
- Interactive map of Hörselgau
- Location within Germany Location within Thuringia
- Coordinates: 50°55′39″N 10°32′36″E
- Country: Germany
- State: Thuringia
- District: Gotha
- Municipality: Hörsel

Area
  - Total: 11.53 km^{2} (4.45 sq mi)
- Elevation: 300 m (980 ft)

Population (2010-12-31)
  - Total: 1,203
  - Density: 104.3/km^{2} (270.2/sq mi)
- Time zone: UTC+01:00 (CET)
  - Summer (DST): UTC+02:00 (CEST)
- Postal codes: 99880
- Dialling codes: 03622

Hörselgau (German pronunciation: [ˈhœʁzl̩ˌɡaʊ]) is a village and a former municipality in the district of Gotha in Thuringia, Germany. Since 1 December 2011 it is part of the municipality Hörsel.

== History ==
Within the German Empire (1871–1918), Hörselgau was part of Saxe-Coburg and Gotha.
