= Laucha, Thuringia =

Laucha
- Ortsteil of Hörsel
- Coat of arms
- Interactive map of Laucha
- Location within Germany Location within Thuringia
- Coordinates: 50°55′38″N 10°32′37″E
- Country: Germany
- State: Thuringia
- District: Gotha
- Municipality: Hörsel

Area
  - Total: 6.65 km^{2} (2.57 sq mi)
- Elevation: 300 m (980 ft)

Population (2010-12-31)
  - Total: 549
  - Density: 82.6/km^{2} (214/sq mi)
- Time zone: UTC+01:00 (CET)
  - Summer (DST): UTC+02:00 (CEST)
- Postal codes: 99880
- Dialling codes: 03622

Laucha (German pronunciation: [ˈlaʊxa]) is a village and a former municipality in the district of Gotha in Thuringia, Germany. Since 1 December 2011, it is part of the municipality Hörsel.

== History ==
Within the German Empire (1871–1918), Laucha was part of Saxe-Coburg and Gotha.
