= Mechterstädt =

- District of Hörsel
- Coat of arms
- Interactive map of Mechterstädt
- Location within Germany Location within Thuringia
- Coordinates: 50°56′30″N 10°31′24″E
- Country: Germany
- State: Thuringia
- District: Gotha
- Municipality: Hörsel

Area
  - Total: 12.42 km^{2} (4.80 sq mi)
- Elevation: 274 m (899 ft)

Population (2010-12-31)
  - Total: 1,035
  - Density: 83.33/km^{2} (215.8/sq mi)
- Time zone: UTC+01:00 (CET)
  - Summer (DST): UTC+02:00 (CEST)
- Postal codes: 99880
- Dialling codes: 03622
- Website: www.mechterstaedt.de

Mechterstädt is a village and a former municipality in the district of Gotha in Thuringia, Germany. Since 1 December 2011, it is part of the municipality Hörsel.

== History ==
Within the German Empire (1871–1918), Mechterstädt was part of Saxe-Coburg and Gotha. In 1920, 15 striking workers were murdered (see Morde von Mechterstädt) by right-wing student activists near the village
