= Wutha-Farnroda =

- Municipality
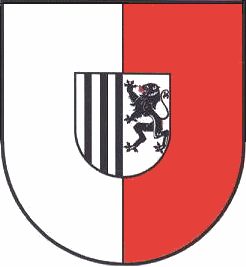
- Coat of arms

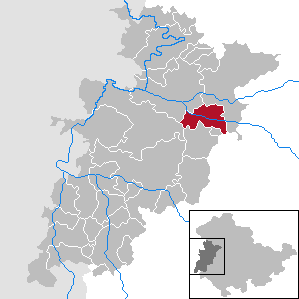
- Location of Wutha-Farnroda within Wartburgkreis district
- Interactive map of Wutha-Farnroda
- Location within Germany Location within Thuringia
- Coordinates: 50°56′48″N 10°23′41″E
- Country: Germany
- State: Thuringia
- District: Wartburgkreis

Government
  - Mayor (2020–26): Jörg Schlothauer

Area
  - Total: 36.55 km^{2} (14.11 sq mi)
- Elevation: 232–470 m (761–1,542 ft)

Population (2025-12-31)
  - Total: 6,268
  - Density: 171.5/km^{2} (444.2/sq mi)
- Time zone: UTC+01:00 (CET)
  - Summer (DST): UTC+02:00 (CEST)
- Postal codes: 99848
- Dialling codes: 036921
- Vehicle registration: WAK
- Website: www.wutha-farnroda.de

Wutha-Farnroda is a municipality in the Wartburgkreis district of Thuringia, Germany.

Wutha station is located on the Halle–Bebra railway.

== Population development ==
For almost two decades from 1994 on, the population of the town declined by almost 2,500. Since 2012 the population has stabilised, numbering approximately 6,250-6,400 people.

- 1994: 8,770
- 2000: 7,794
- 2004: 7,405
- 2010: 6,560
- 2012: 6,312
- 2013: 6,297
- 2014: 6,360
- 2015: 6,340
- 2016: 6,278
- 2017: 6,369
- 2018: 6,382
- 2019: 6,335
- 2020: 6,278
- 2021: 6,271
- 2022: 6,374
- 2023: 6,315
- 2024: 6,268
- 2025: 6,232

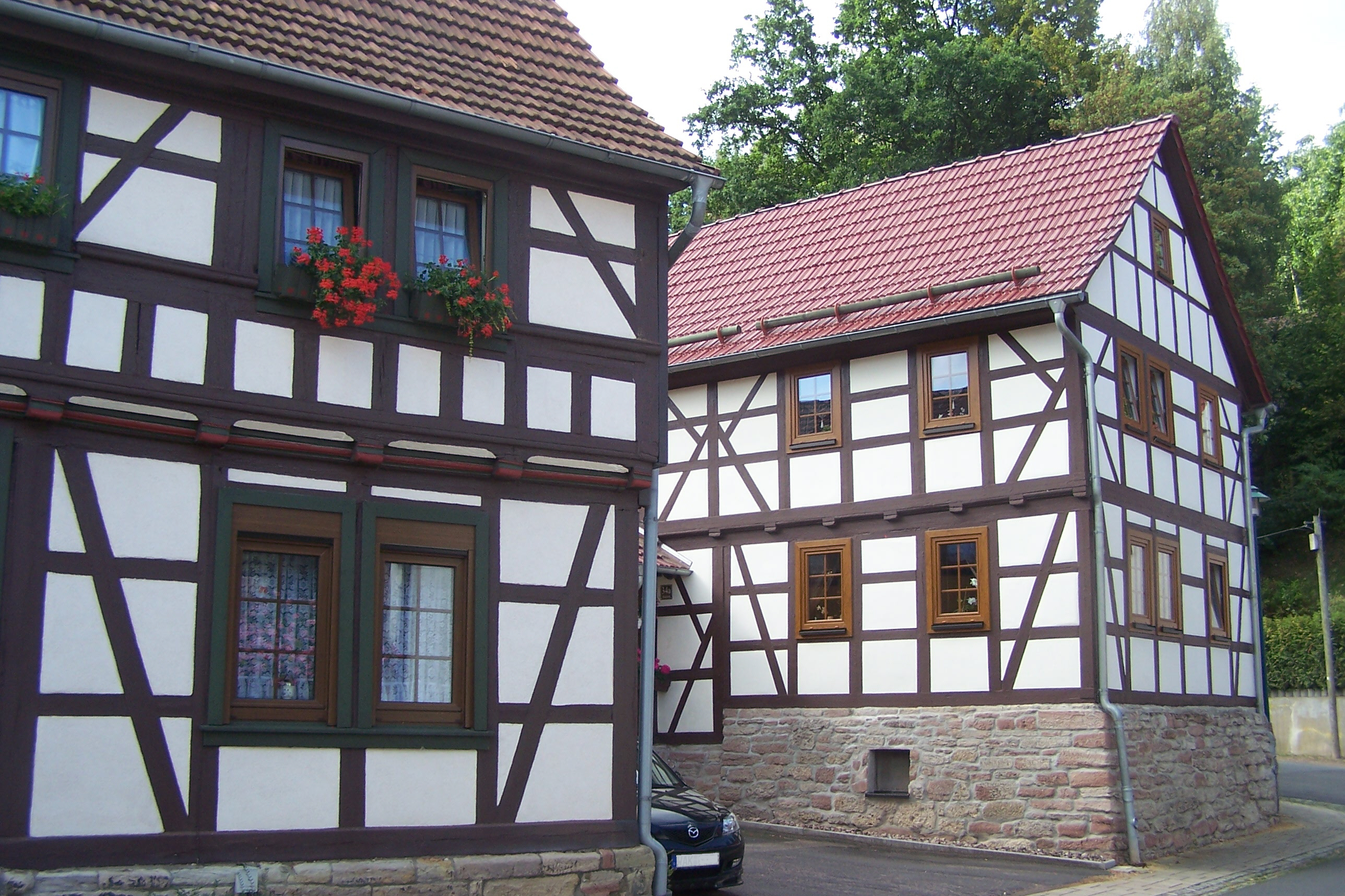
Half-timbered houses
