= Zelle (disambiguation) =

Zelle is a money transfer service in the United States.

Zelle may also refer to:

== Entities ==
- Anti-Imperialist Cell (German: Antiimperialistische Zelle), leftist militant group that carried out bombings in Germany in 1995

== Film ==
- The Glass Cell (film) (German: Die gläserne Zelle), 1978 West German crime film

== Language ==
- Jere language (also Zelle), Nigerian dialect cluster

== Music ==
- Zelle (band), a Filipino alternative pop/rock band

== People ==
- Margaretha Zelle, known as the spy Mata Hari
- Sebastian Zelle, member of the bands NEXX and Supernatural

== Places ==
- Bloße Zelle, highest elevation on the Hils in Germany
- Zelle, village in the borough of Aue in the German federal state of Saxony
  - Zelle Abbey, former Augustinian monastery in the village

== See also ==
- Zele (disambiguation)
- Zell (disambiguation)
- Zella (disambiguation)
