= Zel =

Zel may refer to:

- Zel (novel), a retelling of Rapunzel by Donna Jo Napoli
- Zel (sheep), a breed of sheep
- Bella Bella (Campbell Island) Airport (IATA:ZEL), British Columbia, Canada
- Zero-length launch
- The twelfth letter in the Ottoman Turkish alphabet

== People ==
- Mr. Zel (born 1985), Turkish Cypriot singer
- Zel Fischer (born 1963), judge on the Supreme Court of Missouri
- Denzel Curry, South Florida hip-hop artist

== See also ==
- Zell (disambiguation)
- Zelle (disambiguation)
