= St. Nicholas' Church, Aue =

Coordinates: 50°35′07″N 12°42′19″E

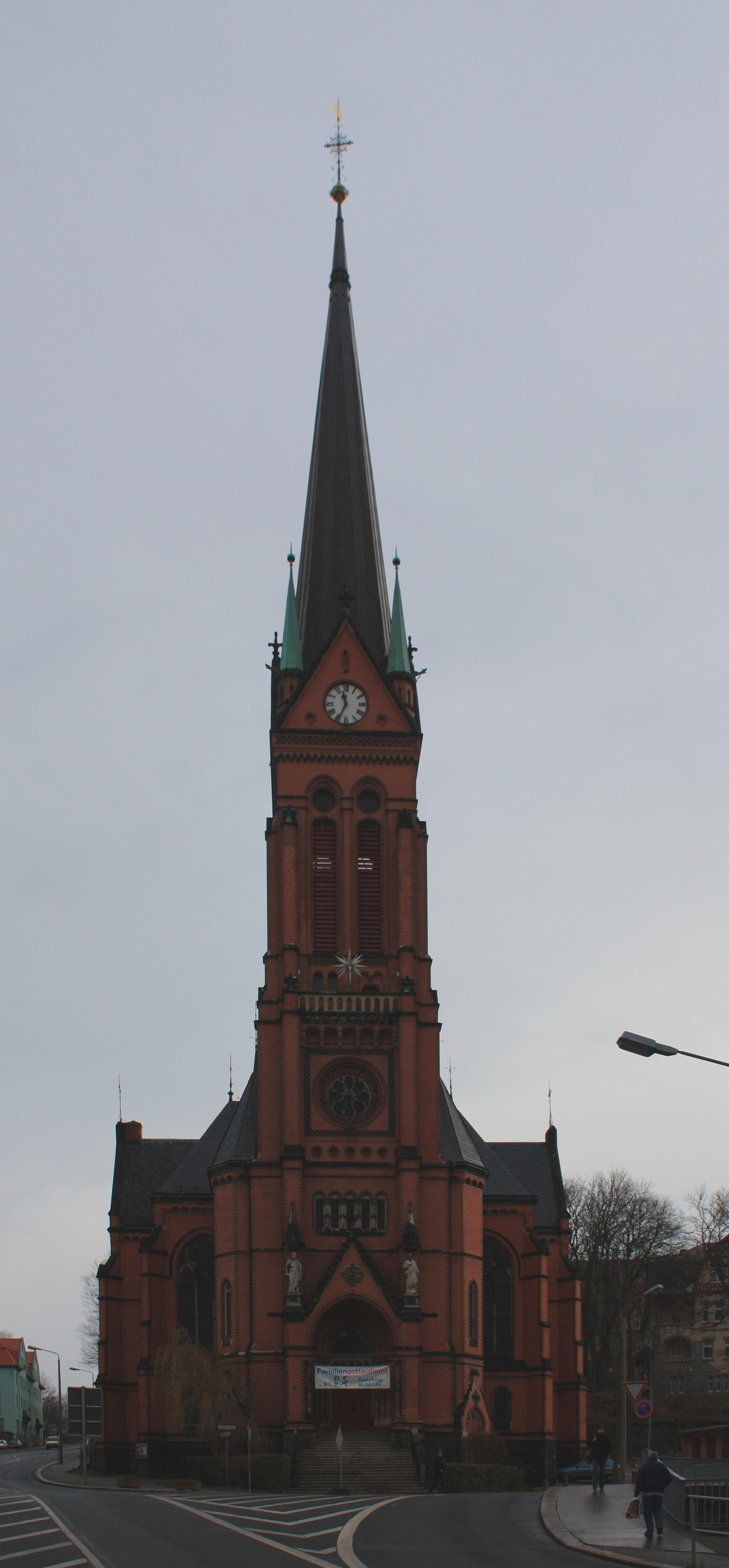
St. Nicholas' Church: west tower and main door

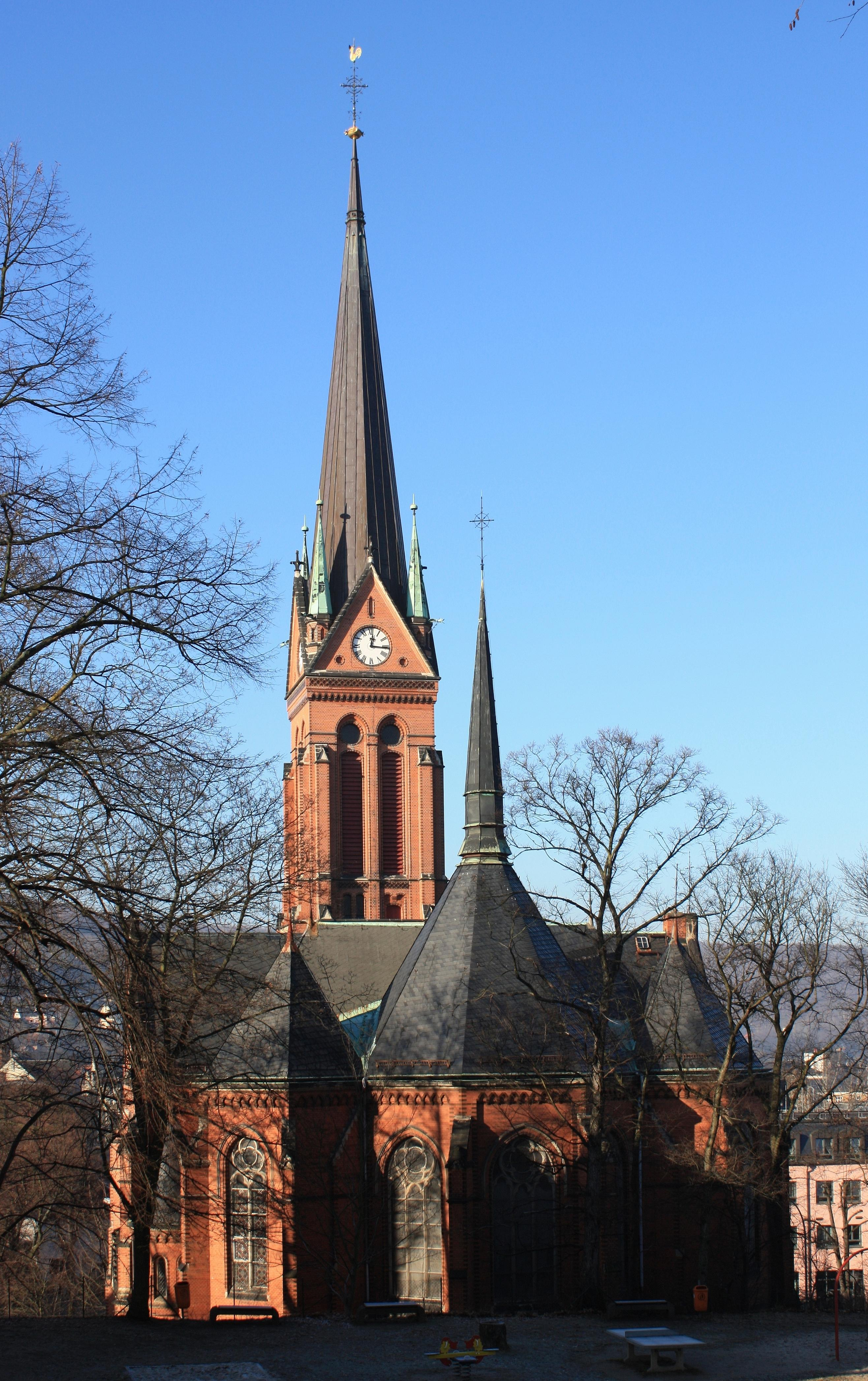
East side: Choir and ridge turret

The Evangelical-Lutheran parish church of St. Nicholas (German: Pfarrkirche St. Nikolai) in Aue is a Neo-Gothic hall church of the Evangelical Lutheran State Church of Saxony in the Saxon Ore Mountains and the tallest building in the town.

== History ==
Aue, whose origin is closely linked to the abbey of abbey of Zelle founded in 1173, was first mentioned as an independent church parish in 1286 and was looked after by Augustinian canons regular until the Reformation. The first church building, of which no details have been passed down, was located on the former church square, the Kirchplatz (the present Neumarkt), and was replaced by a new building between 1625 and 1628. On 4 August 1633 this building, together with a large part of the town, was destroyed in a raid by imperial troops. By 1636 the church had been temporarily rebuilt. In 1639 the new pulpit was consecrated and, in 1643, the new bells. In 1648 the church was given a new baptismal font as a present from a married couple from Auerhammer. In the following year the townsfolk of Aue donated a new altar table. Its first organ was installed around 1654. When the old St. Nicholas' Church fell into disrepair at the end of the 19th century and became too small for the rapidly growing population, the parish council decided to have a new church built and had the old building demolished in 1895. The area was grassed and planted with chestnut trees. A stone ball that had adorned the entrance of the old building, was placed on a stele and was given a place in the Luther Park, the former churchyard behind the new building.

After the parish of Aue had donated 27,500 marks (ℳ) in 1885 for the new St. Nicholas' Church and after protracted negotiations, a site was chosen in 1889 that dominated all other buildings in the town. This proved to be difficult from an engineering perspective because the nature of the soil was partly rocky and partly sandy and there were old mineshafts and a gallery, part of an old mine, under the site.

The ceremonial laying of the foundation stone took place on 27 July 1891 with the participation of a large number of the population and, a year later, the Hebefeier was celebrated. On 4 December 1892 the three bells in B flat major, cast by G. A. Jauck in Leipzig and which weighed together 5,055 kg, were inaugurated. The bells from the old St. Nicholas' Church were exchanged for them in payment. After the interior had been completed the church was opened on 2 September 1893.

== Historic views ==
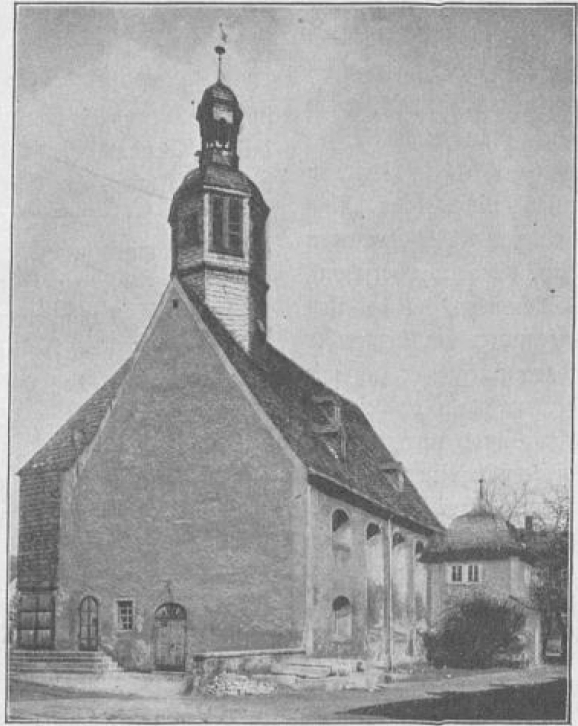
Old St. Nicholas' Church (demolished in 1895)

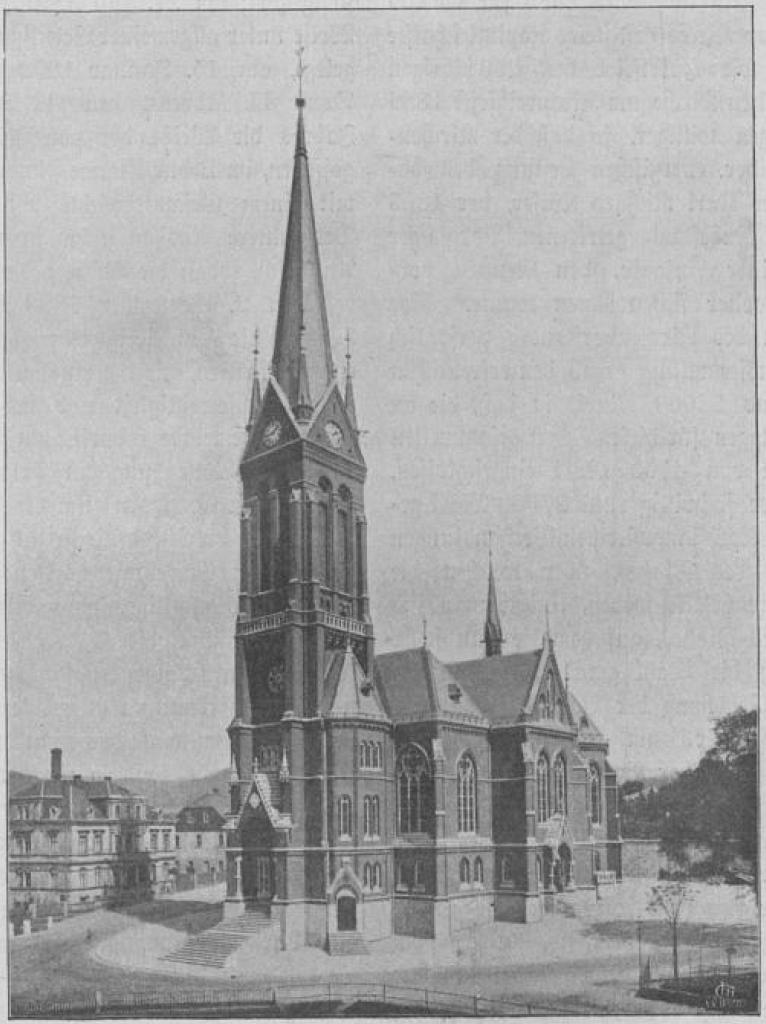
New church around 1900

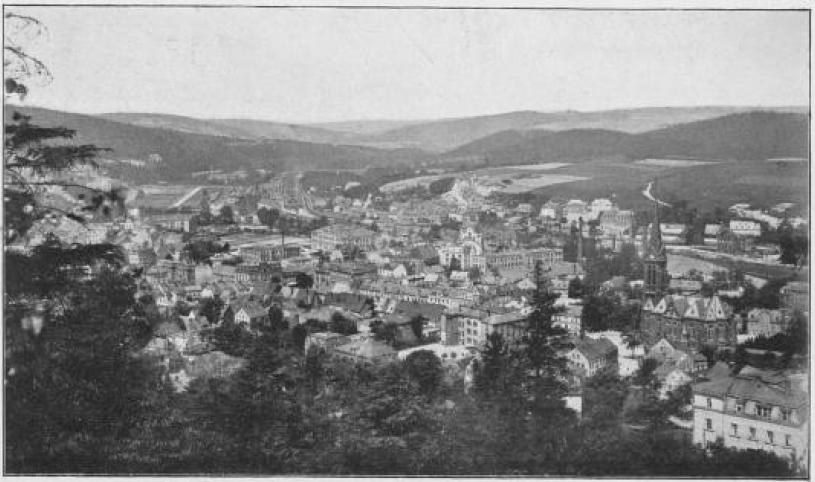
Site of the new church above the old town around 1900

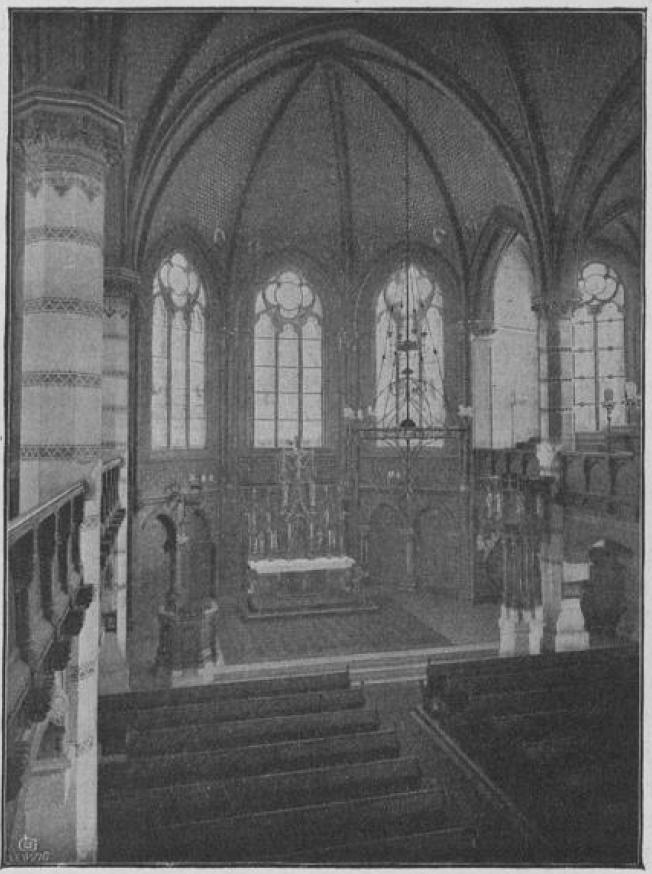
Interior around 1900

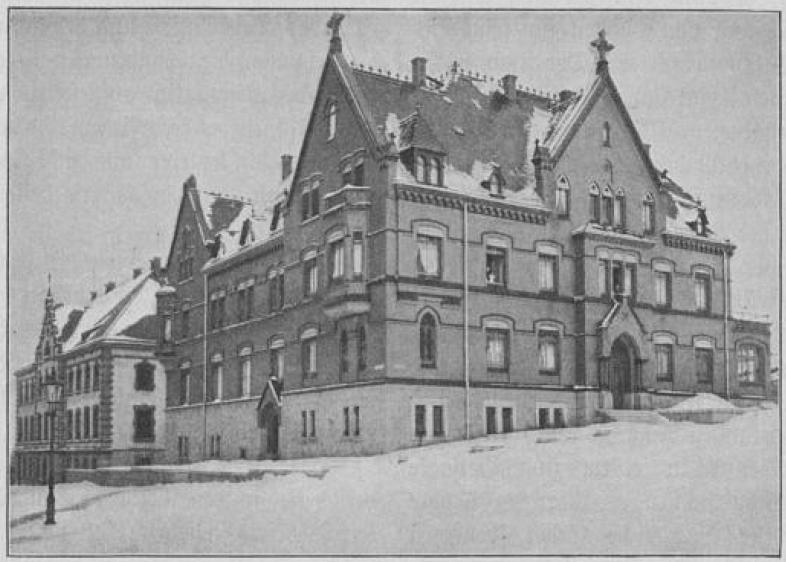
New vicarge around 1900

== Construction details ==
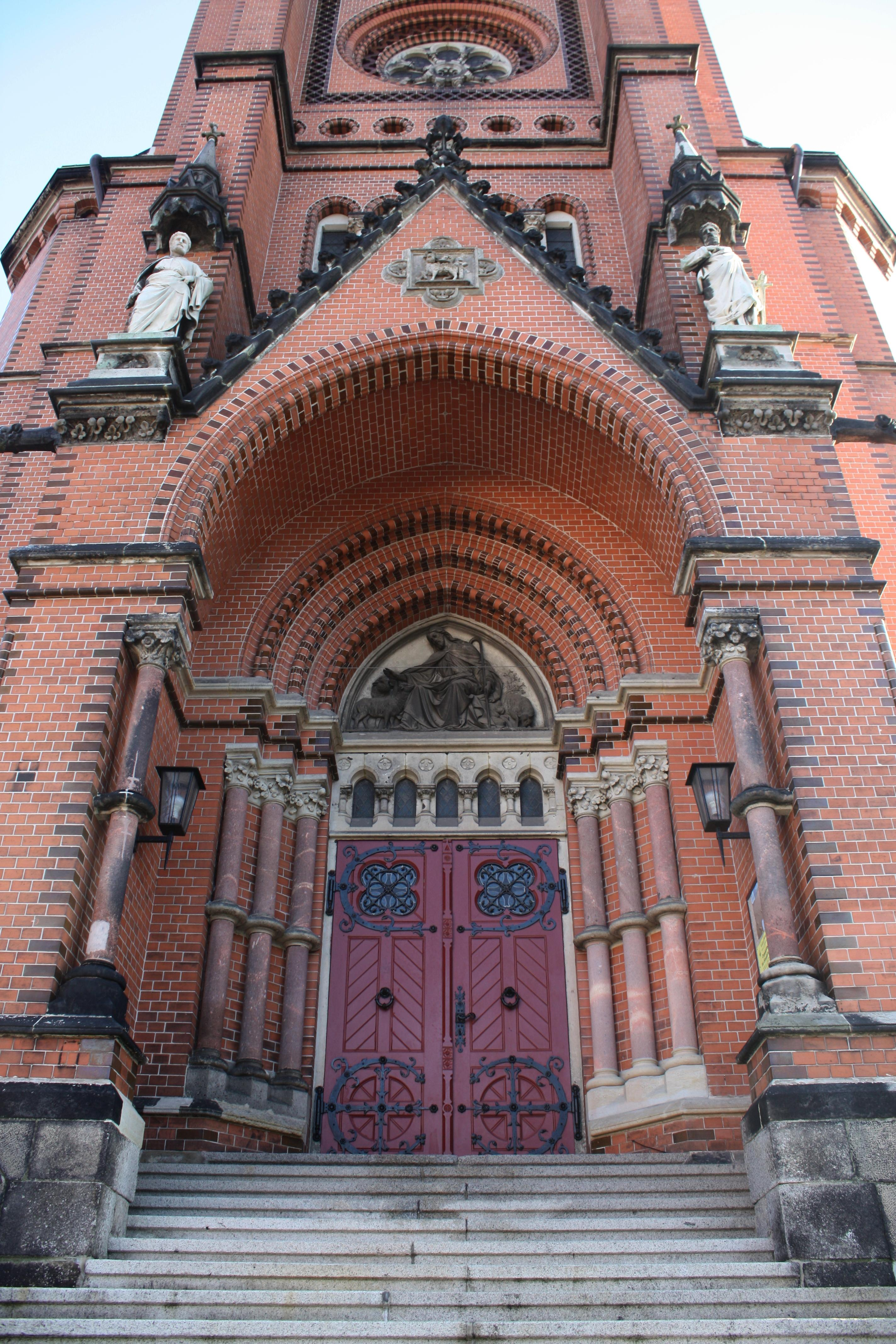
Main door

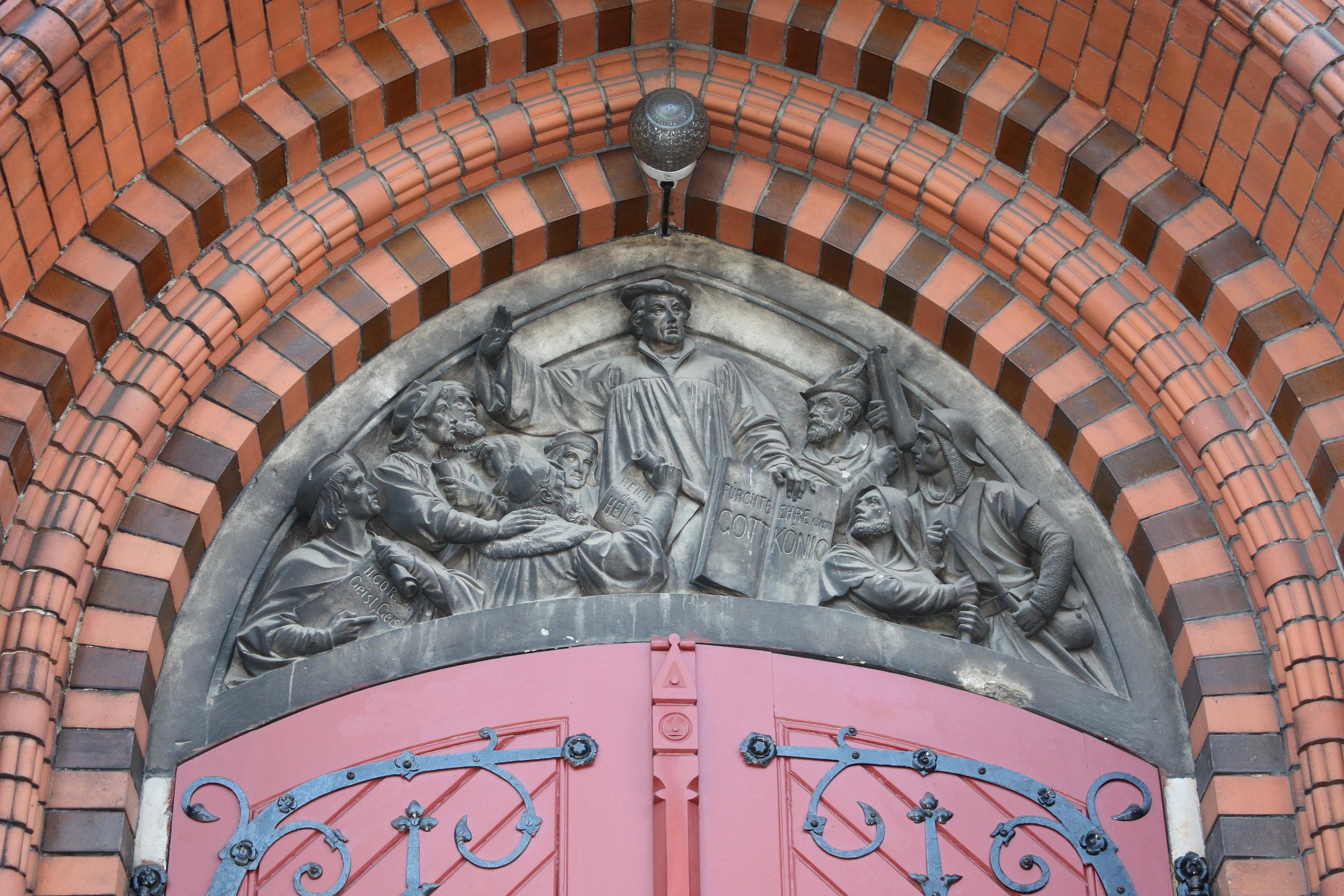
Lunette over the northern side door

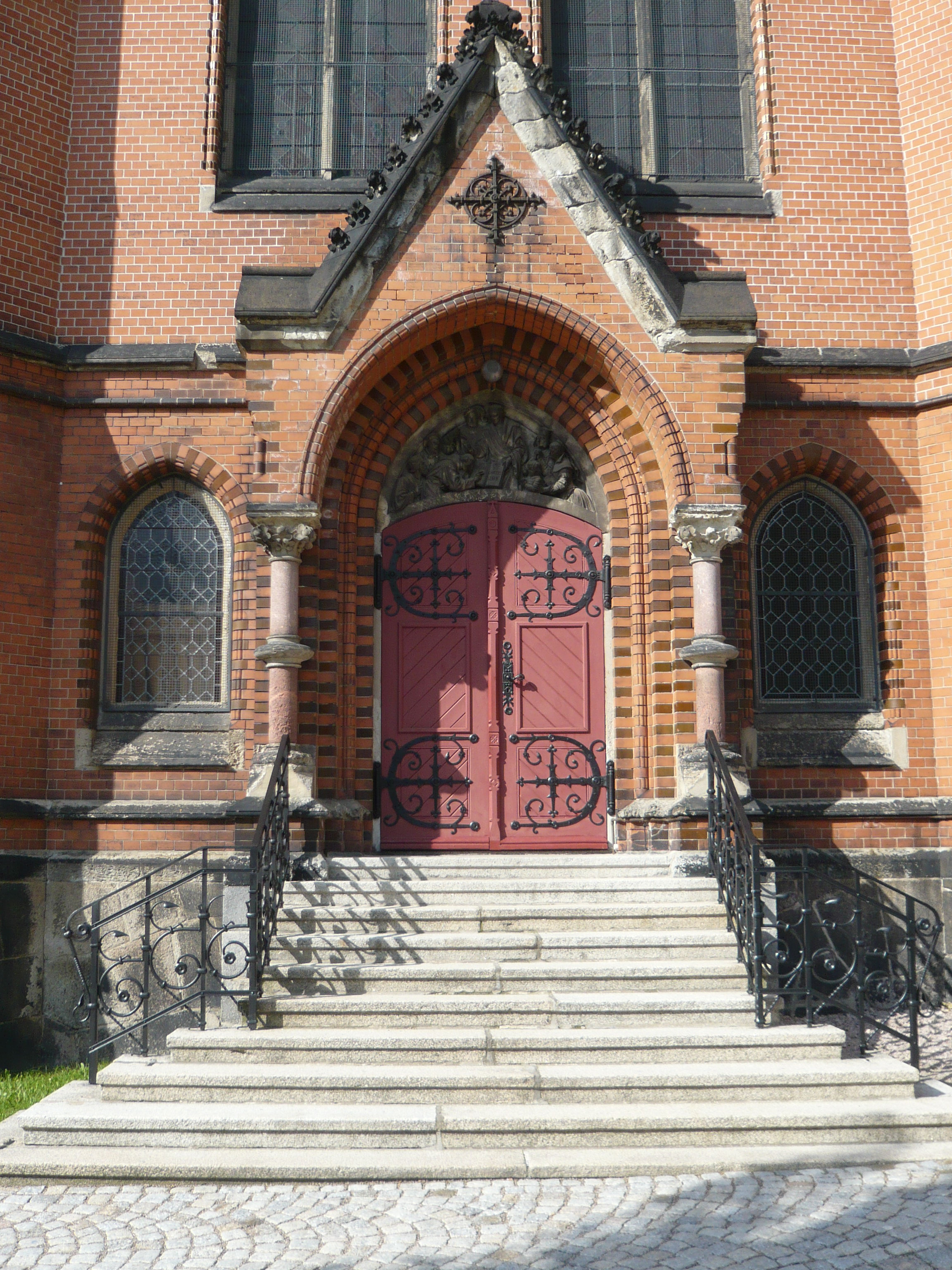
Side door
(May 2009)

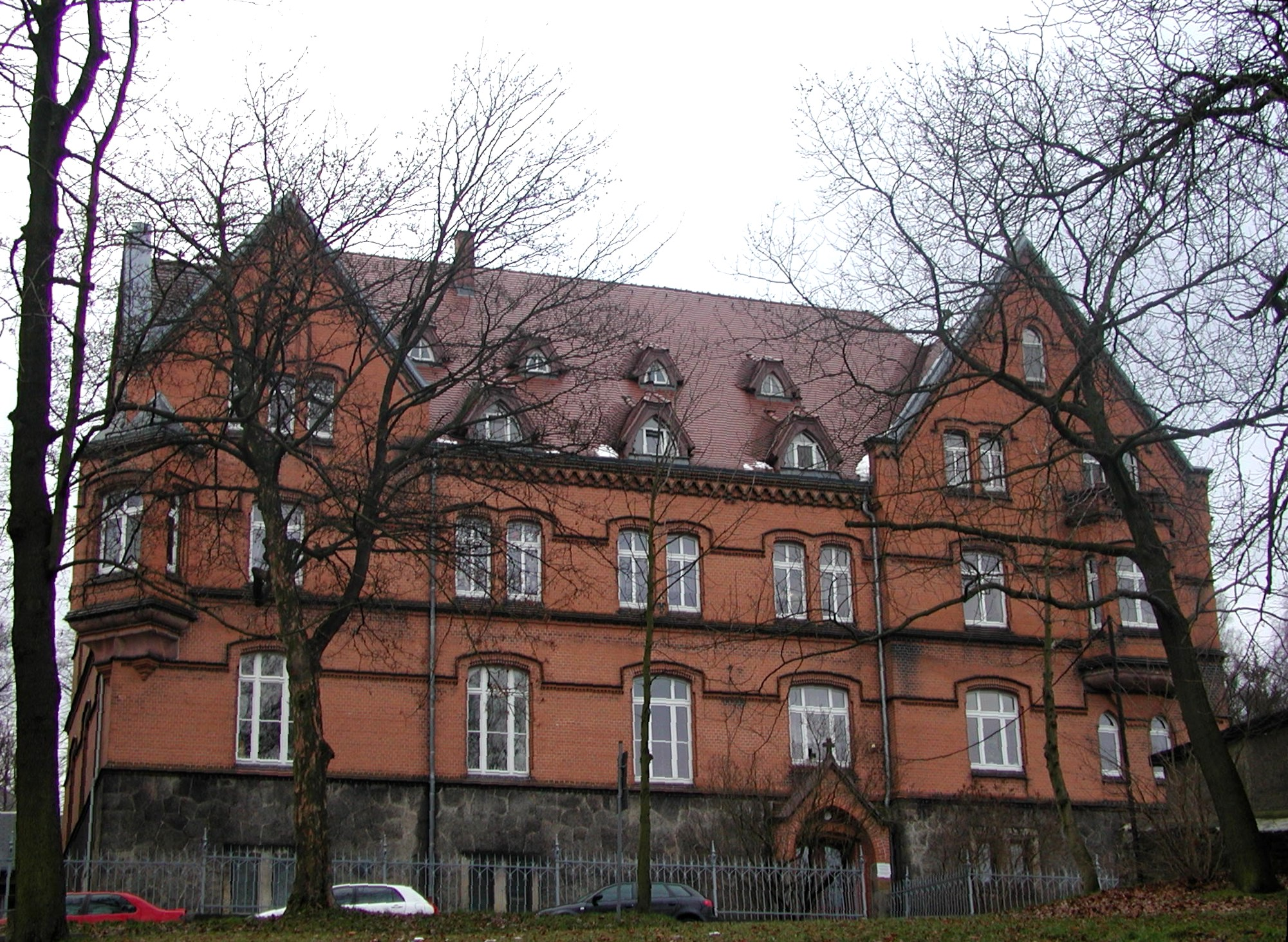
The vicarage (November 2008)

== Sources ==
- Georg Dehio: Handbuch der Deutschen Kunstdenkmäler Sachsen: II. Regierungsbezirke Leipzig und Chemnitz. Deutscher Kunstverlag, München 1998, S. 28-29.
