= Zell =

Zell may refer to:

== Places ==
=== Austria ===
- Zell am See, in Salzburg state
- Zell am Ziller, in Tyrol
- Zell, Carinthia, in Carinthia
- in Upper Austria:
  - Bad Zell
  - Zell am Moos
  - Zell an der Pram
  - Zell am Pettenfirst

=== Germany ===
- Zell im Fichtelgebirge, in the district of Hof, Bavaria, formerly Zell, Upper Franconia
- Zell am Harmersbach, in Baden-Württemberg
- Zell unter Aichelberg, in Baden-Württemberg
- The former name of St. Ulrich im Schwarzwald, in Baden-Württemberg
- Zell im Wiesental, in Baden-Württemberg
- Zell am Main, in the district of Würzburg, Bavaria
- Zell, Upper Palatinate, in the district of Cham, Bavaria
- Zell (Mosel), in Rhineland-Palatinate
- Zell (Verbandsgemeinde), a collective municipality in Cochem-Zell, Rhineland-Palatinate
- Zell, an Ortsteil of Bad König

=== Switzerland ===
- Zell, Lucerne
- Zell, Zurich

=== United States ===
- Zell, Missouri
- Zell, South Dakota

== People ==
- Christian Zell (c. 1683 – 1763), German harpsichord maker
- Marc Zell (born 1953), American-Israeli attorney and chairman of Republicans Overseas Israel
- Matthäus Zell (1477–1548), Lutheran theologian and reformer
- Sam Zell (1941–2023), American business magnate
- Zell Hart Deming (1869–1936), American suffragist and newspaper editor
- Zell Miller (1932–2018), American politician

== Other ==
- ZELL, zero-length launch system for aircraft
- Zell Dincht, a character in the video game Final Fantasy VIII
- Baron Garr von Zell, a character in the video game The Beast Within: A Gabriel Knight Mystery

== See also ==
- Zel (disambiguation)
- Zelle (disambiguation)
