= Max Poepel =

Lord Mayor of Aue
- In office Late 1945–April 1945

Deputy Lord Mayor of Aue
- In office 1940–1945

Member of the Aue City Council
- In office 1930s–1940s

Personal details
- Party: NSDAP (Nazis)
- Nickname: Mayor Mad Max

Max Poepel (21 October 1896 – 28 August 1966) was the acting Lord Mayor (Oberbürgermeister) of Aue in the German federal state of Saxony from the end of 1945. In this capacity he prevented the destruction of the most important bridges in the industrial town by German Wehrmacht forces.

== Life and works ==
Poepel was born on 21 October 1896 in Aue in the German state of Saxony, the son of a smith, Albin Poepel. At 18 years of age Max Poepel became a soldier in the First World War, where he obtained a driving licence and worked as a vehicle driver. Following his return to his home town he finished his education and became a master smith. He eventually took over his father's horseshoe workshop and smithy and developed it into a car workshop because of increasing motorisation. In the 1930s he had the Ford franchise for Aue and the surrounding area. In 1933 he joined the Nazi Motor Corps (NSKK). Due to differences of opinion with the leadership of the Corps he was later banned. In the same period Poepel was elected to the town council. When the Lord Mayor, Paul Geipel, was called up for Wehrmacht service in 1940 Poepel deputised as Lord Mayor and, from January 1945, he became the acting Lord Mayor (kommissarischer Oberbürgermeister). In spring of 1945 he learned that a unit from the American Army was advancing on the town from the west. A Wehrmacht combat commander who had only just been appointed, and who was subordinated to a unit of SS storm troopers, had ensured that Aue was ready to defend itself, true to the Führer's orders. As part of the defensive preparations the key bridges were fitted with explosive charges and three twin machine guns were placed around the railway station. At the final council meeting on 25 April 1945 the military situation was discussed. The combat commander reported on the planned defensive measures and the consequences of surrender: the Mayor of Lößnitz, Rudolf Weber, had just been shot because he had surrendered the town to the Americans without a fight.

Although Poepel was a member of the Nazi Party and in spite of the threat of coercion he took responsibility for the inhabitants and the refugees staying in the town. When he heard of the refusal of the Head of the Technical Emergency Service (Technische Nothilfe) to blow up the bridges, Poepel looked to an ally in Captain Zind of the Army engineers. With Poepel's personal guarantee the latter was able to persuade the divisional headquarters to have anti-tank obstacles built instead of blowing up the bridges. Within four days members of the Technical Emergency Service built numerous anti-tank obstacles on the key bridges in Aue, using wooden beams and stones ridges. On 4 May 1945 only a weak US armoured reconnaissance troop reached the town, but was able to take it without fighting by bypassing the tank traps. The events of those days were held in Max Poepel's personal records which were found in 1991 and titled "The Last Days of the Third Reich in Aue, as I experienced it as a Town Councillor and Deputy Mayor". The complete text is in Aue's district archives. An abridged version was printed in 1991 and 1992 as a serialization in the daily newspaper, Freie Presse.

The Americans did not occupy Aue administratively, but took some war booty from the inhabitants, including watches, binoculars, cameras and jewelry. When the Red Army took over the town from the Americans in accordance with the division of Germany into occupation zones after the Yalta Conference in June 1945, Max Poepel was arrested by the Soviet occupation forces, despite his record and the support of some anti-fascists. Up to 1949 he was held in a number of NKVD special camps like Torgau, Mühlberg and Buchenwald. In 1950, Poepel returned to Aue and was able to take over his garage business again, which had been run during his absence by its master mechanic, Fritz Taut. The garage's most important work was to repair existing cars, since there were hardly any new cars. Poepel led this workshop until his death in 1966.

Max Poepel was married to Greta, née Schulz, and they had a daughter, Anneliese. Anneliese Poepel studied under the strict tutelage of her father's car mechanic, passed the trade test and later received the master's certificate. She married Erich Schmutzler, who manufactured cutting and punching tools in several of the rooms in his father-in-law's workshop. After Poepel's death in Aue on 28 August 1966, Schmutzler at first allowed the garage to be run under by an employee and ran the cutter and punch business himself. When the number of employees working for independent artisans became regulated by the authorities, Erich Schmutzler finally gave up Max Poepel's garage in 1969.

Max Poepel's urn was buried in the family grave in Aue-Zelle. Anneliese Schmutzler, née Poepel, died in 2008.

== Sources ==
- Aue, Mosaiksteine der Geschichte, Hrsg. Stadtverwaltung Aue, Druckerei und Verlag Mike Rockstroh, Aue 1997; S. 170-172
- Max Poepel: Des Stadtrats Tagebuch; Dokumentensammlung Nr. 657 im Kreisarchiv Aue
