= Zele (disambiguation) =

Zele may refer to:

== Geography ==
- Zele, Belgium
- Zele, Poland

== Languages ==
- Zele language of Nigeria

== People ==
- Dorina Zele (born 1992), Hungarian basketball player

== Others ==
- Zagato Zele 1000, an electric microcar
