= Zelle Abbey =

Monastery in Zelle, Germany

Coordinates: 50°35′53″N 12°41′35″E

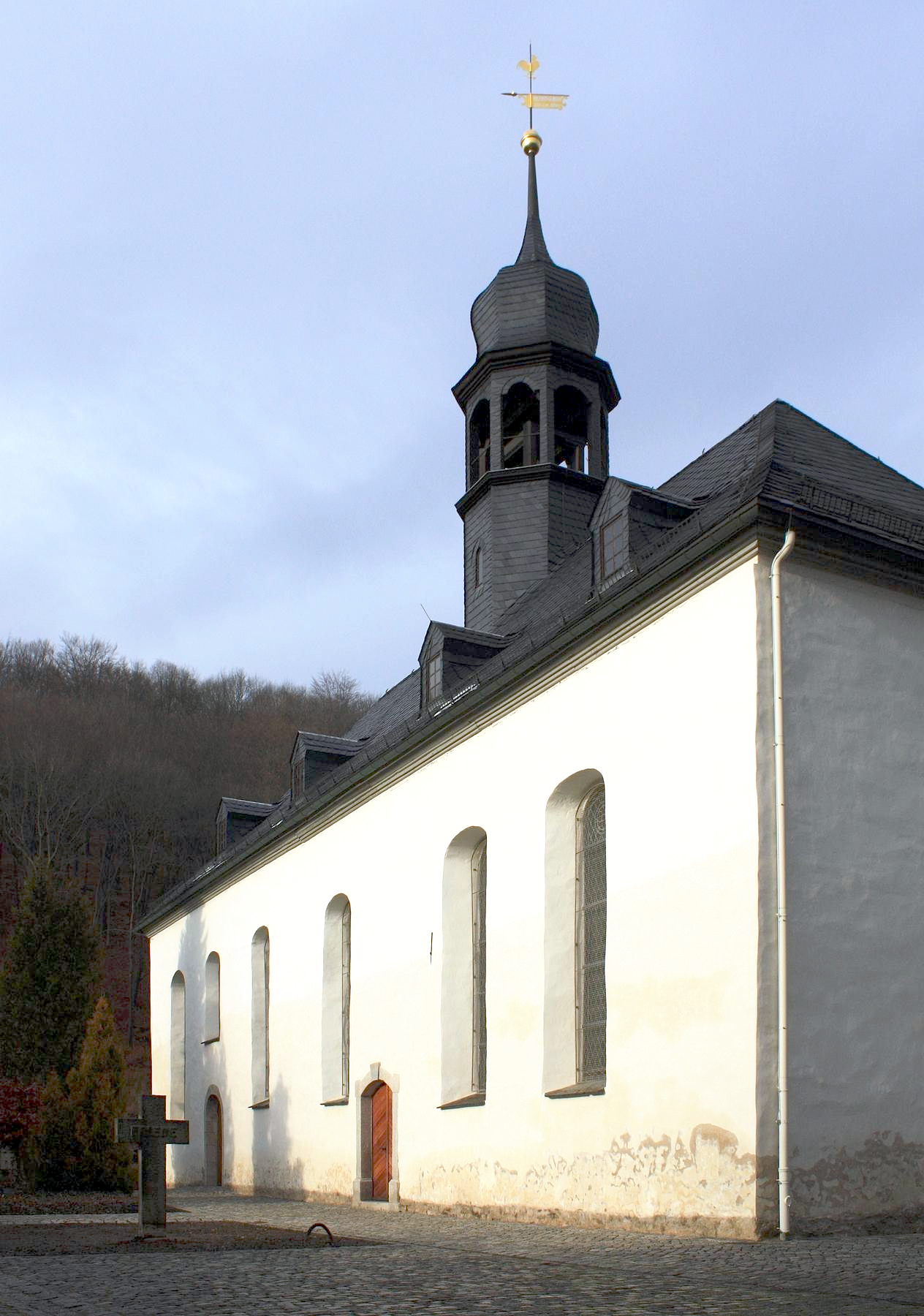
Abbey church (south side)

Zelle Abbey (German: Klösterlein Zelle) is a former Augustinian monastery of canons regular in the village of Zelle in the borough of Aue in the German federal state of Saxony. It served as a Lutheran church from 1879 to 1914.

== Sources ==
- Ralf Petermann: Wertvolle Befunde am Klösterlein Zelle, Aue, 1996
- Günter Kavacs und Norbert Oelsner: Die Kirche des "Klösterlein Zelle" zu Aue. Baugeschichtliche Beobachtungen und historische Einordnung. In: Denkmalpflege in Sachsen. Mitteilungen des Landesamtes für Denkmalpflege Sachsen 2002, ISSN 0943-2132, S. 104–121.
- Georg Dehio: Handbuch der Deutschen Kunstdenkmäler Sachsen: II. Regierungsbezirke Leipzig und Chemnitz. Deutscher Kunstverlag, München 1998, S. 880f.
