= Aue, Saxony =

Town in Saxony, Germany

Aue
- Stadtteil of Aue-Bad Schlema
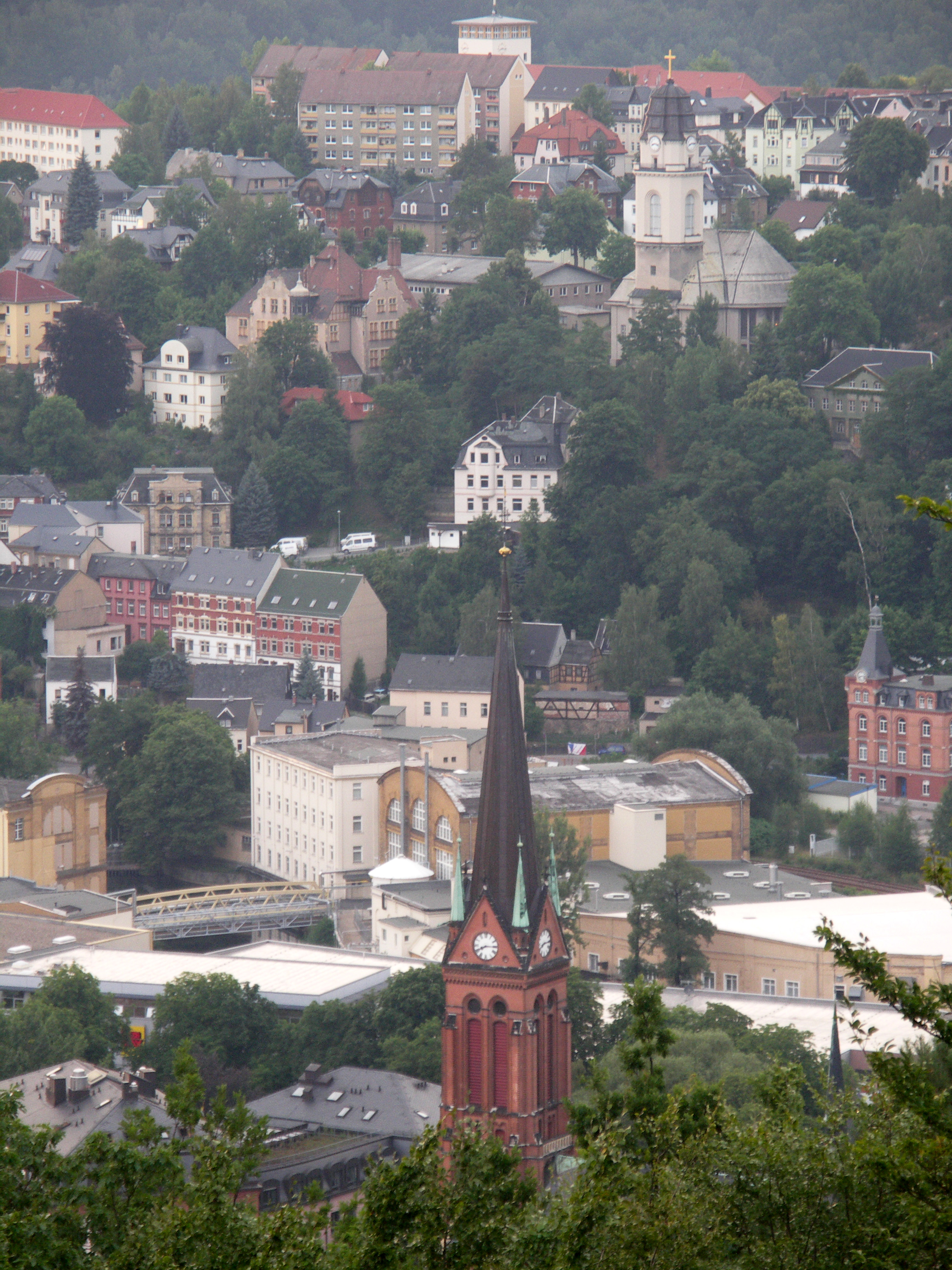
- July 2008 view of central Aue, including the St. Nicholas' Church

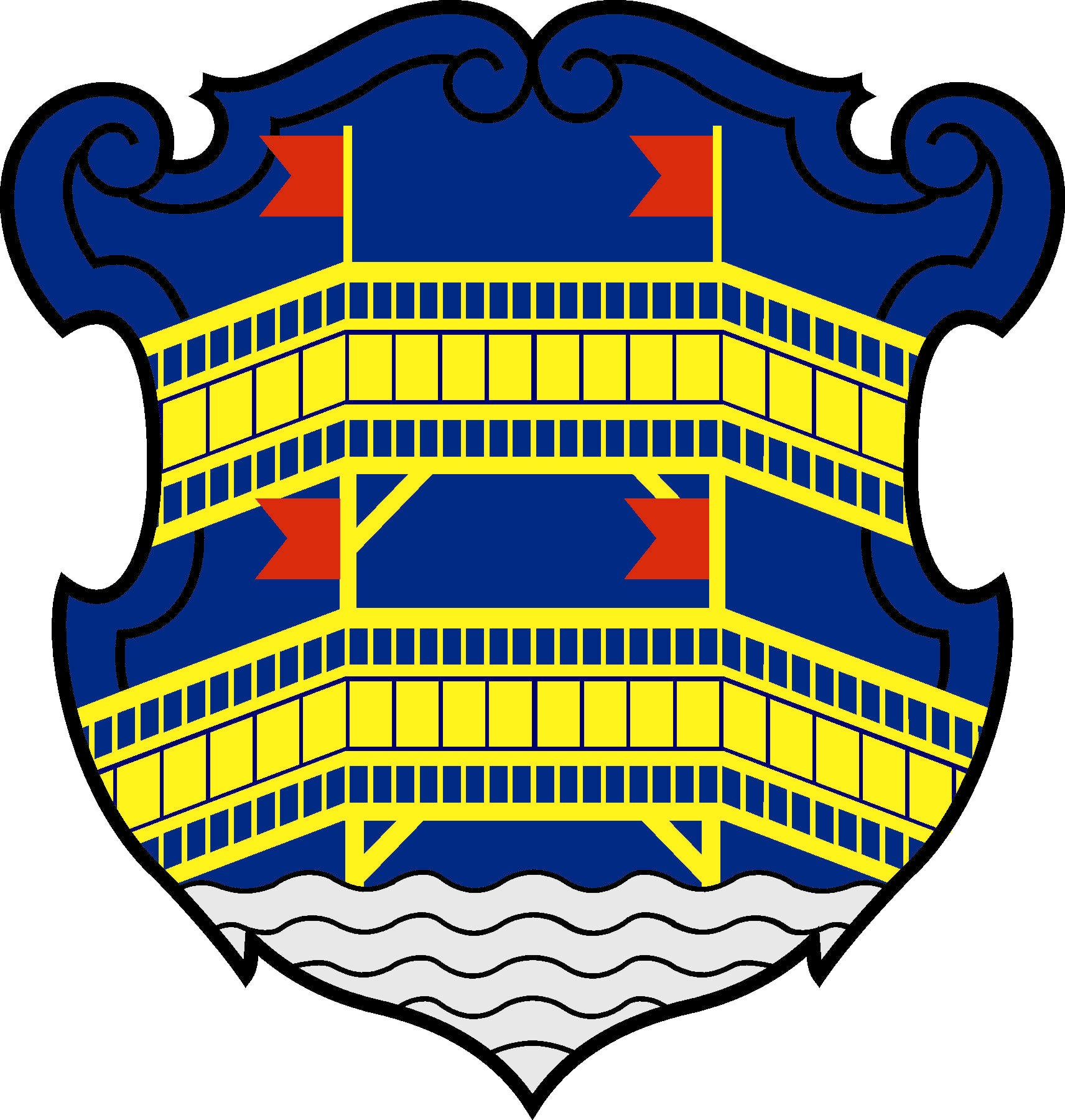
- Coat of arms
- Interactive map of Aue
- Location within Germany Location within Saxony
- Coordinates: 50°35′17″N 12°42′2″E
- Country: Germany
- State: Saxony
- District: Erzgebirgskreis
- Town: Aue-Bad Schlema

Area
  - Total: 20.92 km^{2} (8.08 sq mi)
- Elevation: 320–564 m (1,050–1,850 ft)

Population (2017-12-31)
  - Total: 16,012
  - Density: 765.4/km^{2} (1,982/sq mi)
- Time zone: UTC+01:00 (CET)
  - Summer (DST): UTC+02:00 (CEST)
- Postal codes: 08280
- Dialling codes: 03771
- Vehicle registration: ERZ, ANA, ASZ, AU, MAB, MEK, STL, SZB, ZP
- Website: www.aue.de

Aue (German pronunciation: [ˈaʊ̯ə]) is a small town in Germany at the outlet of the river Schwarzwasser into the river Zwickauer Mulde in the Ore Mountains, and has roughly 16,000 inhabitants. It was merged into the new town Aue-Bad Schlema in January 2019. Aue was the administrative seat of the former district of Aue-Schwarzenberg in Saxony, and is part of the Erzgebirgskreis since August 2008. It belongs to the Silberberg Town League (Städtebund Silberberg)

The mining town has been known for its copper, titanium, and kaolinite. The town was a machine-building and cutlery manufacturing centre in East German times and is now developing tourism, as the Silver Road (Silberstraße) runs through town. The town is also known for the football club FC Erzgebirge Aue, which is currently playing in the 3rd German division (3. Bundesliga)

Aue was until 1991 a centre of the Sowjetisch-Deutsche Aktiengesellschaft Wismut (“Soviet-German Wismut Corporation”, or SDAG Wismut).

== History ==
The town's first mention came in 1219 when it was named in a document as Bertoldus prepositus de Owa. Owa, later also Awe or Aw referred to the meadow (although Aue in German actually means “floodplain”) at the forks of the Schwarzwasser und Zwickauer Mulde, where the first settlers had their homes next to the small monastery of Zelle, founded in 1173. In 1479, tin and silver mining began, leading to an upswing in the town's fortunes. In 1526, the Auerhammer (ironworks), later called Eisenwerk and now a constituent community of Aue, had its first documentary mention.

The first St. Nicholas' Church, of which no details have been passed down, was located on the former church square, the Kirchplatz (the present Neumarkt) and must have been replaced by a new building between 1625 and 1628. On 4 August 1633 this building, together with a large part of the town, was destroyed in a raid by imperial troops. By 1636 the church had been temporarily rebuilt.

In 1627, Aue was granted market rights by Elector Johann Georg I of Saxony for a yearly market on Saint Bartholomew's Day (27 August), and in 1632 for a second, the Katharinenmarkt, on 25 November. In 1635, Veit Hans Schnorr founded the first blue dye works in Saxony in Niederpfannenstiel, now also a constituent community of Aue. From 1711 kaolin was also delivered to Meißen for preparing porcelain. Since the mid-18th century, documents have referred to Aue as a town. In 1897, Zelle was amalgamated with Aue, and Alberoda followed in 1929. Already by 1901, the royal Amt court had taken up its function in the town.

One of Saxony's oldest artworks is the painting from the east wall of the little monastery, which shows Emperor Friedrich I Barbarossa, Mary and a bishop. In the 1930s, it was removed for reasons of restoration, and is now found in the St.-Annen-Kapelle near the cathedral in Freiberg. A copy by H. Beck is found in the Friedenskirche Aue-Zelle (“Peace Church”).

During World War II, a subcamp of the Flossenbürg concentration camp was located here.

Like Schwarzenberg, the town remained unoccupied for a while after the Second World War ended in 1945.

From 1952 to 1990, Aue was part of the Bezirk Karl-Marx-Stadt of East Germany. Until 1994, the town was the administrative seat of the district of Aue. With district reform in Saxony that year, Aue became the administrative seat of the newly formed district of Aue-Schwarzenberg.

Since 1996, there has been a Silberberg Town League (Städtebund Silberberg), to which, besides Aue, also belong Schneeberg, Schwarzenberg, Bad Schlema, Lauter and Lößnitz. In November 2006 the mayors of Aue, Lößnitz, Schneeberg and Bad Schlema expressed the intention of amalgamating their respective municipalities into a united town of Silberberg.

== Geography ==
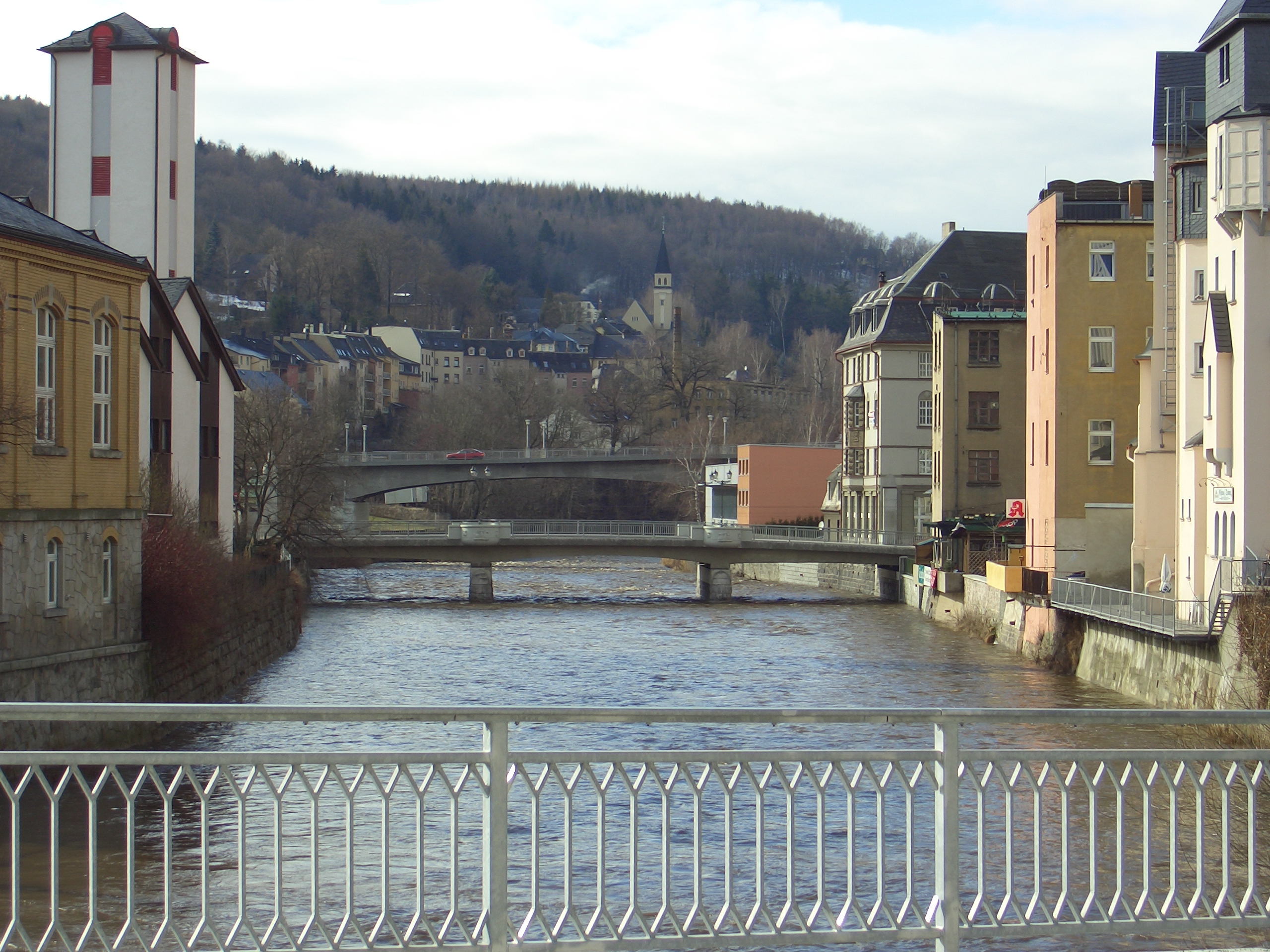
Bridges over the Zwickauer Mulde

=== Neighbouring communities ===
Bordering communities are Bad Schlema, Bernsbach, Bockau, Zschorlau, the towns of Lauter, Lößnitz and Schneeberg in the district of Aue-Schwarzenberg as well as the town of Hartenstein in the Zwickauer Land.

=== Population development ===
Development of population figures (from 1960 on 31 December):

1839 to 1939

- 1839 – 1,106
- 1875 – 2,677
- 1880 – 3,523
- 1885 – 8,442
- 1933 – 25,836
- 1939 – 25,445

1946 to 1984

- 1946 – 25,567 1
- 1950 – 35,785 2
- 1960 – 31,182
- 1971 – 32,000
- 1981 – 28,914
- 1984 – 28,523

1995 to 2002

- 1995 – 19,251
- 1998 – 19,933
- 1999 – 19,707
- 2000 – 19,422
- 2001 – 19,124
- 2002 – 18,961

2003 to 2006

- 2003 – 18,759
- 2004 – 18,611
- 2005 – 18,327
- 2006 – 18,029
- 2007 – 18,000(June)
- 2009 – 17,533

Source as of 1998: Statistisches Landesamt des Freistaates Sachsen

1 29 October
2 31 August

=== Climate ===
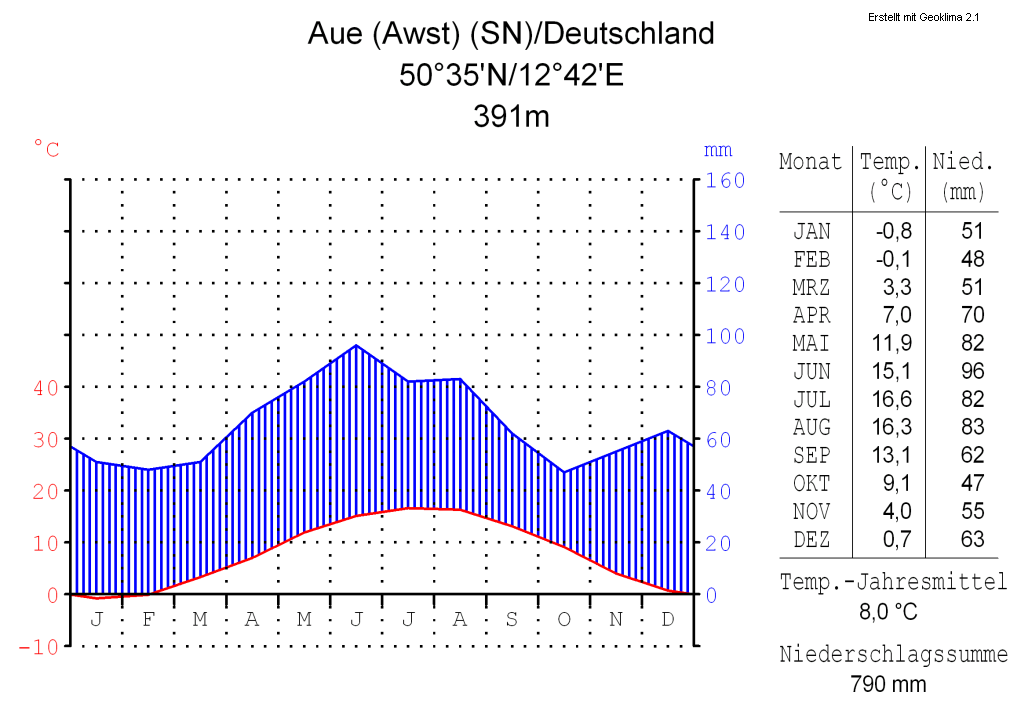
Climatic diagram of Aue

The climate of Aue is typical of an offshore climate (Köppen: Cfb; Trewartha: Dolk). Aue's average air temperature is 8.8 °C (47.8 °F), and the yearly precipitation is 827.7 mm (32.59 in).

The Aue weather station has recorded the following extreme values:

- Highest Temperature 37.1 °C (98.8 °F) on 13 August 2003.
- Warmest Minimum 22.1 °C (71.8 °F) on 1 August 1983.
- Coldest Maximum −13.6 °C (7.5 °F) on 31 December 1996.
- Lowest Temperature −22.9 °C (−9.2 °F) on 8 January 1985.
- Highest Daily Precipitation 81.8 mm (3.22 in) on 23 July 2010.
- Wettest Month 280.3 mm (11.04 in) in August 2002.
- Wettest Year 1,194.5 mm (47.03 in) in 2010.
- Driest Year 540.2 mm (21.27 in) in 1982.
- Earliest Snowfall: 14 October 2015.
- Latest Snowfall: 6 May 1979.
- Longest annual sunshine: 1,861.5 hours in 2003.
- Shortest annual sunshine: 1,395.4 hours in 2002.

Climate data for Aue, 1991−2020 normals, extremes 1977-present
Month	Jan	Feb	Mar	Apr	May	Jun	Jul	Aug	Sep	Oct	Nov	Dec	Year
Record high °C (°F)	16.9 (62.4)	20.1 (68.2)	23.5 (74.3)	30.0 (86.0)	31.5 (88.7)	36.8 (98.2)	35.5 (95.9)	37.1 (98.8)	31.4 (88.5)	27.2 (81.0)	20.9 (69.6)	17.0 (62.6)	37.1 (98.8)
Mean maximum °C (°F)	11.7 (53.1)	13.9 (57.0)	18.3 (64.9)	23.5 (74.3)	27.2 (81.0)	30.7 (87.3)	31.6 (88.9)	31.7 (89.1)	27.1 (80.8)	23.1 (73.6)	16.4 (61.5)	12.0 (53.6)	33.8 (92.8)
Mean daily maximum °C (°F)	3.7 (38.7)	4.9 (40.8)	8.7 (47.7)	14.0 (57.2)	18.3 (64.9)	21.6 (70.9)	23.7 (74.7)	23.7 (74.7)	19.0 (66.2)	13.9 (57.0)	8.2 (46.8)	4.6 (40.3)	13.7 (56.7)
Daily mean °C (°F)	0.3 (32.5)	1.0 (33.8)	3.9 (39.0)	8.4 (47.1)	12.7 (54.9)	16.0 (60.8)	17.9 (64.2)	17.5 (63.5)	13.3 (55.9)	9.0 (48.2)	4.4 (39.9)	1.4 (34.5)	8.8 (47.8)
Mean daily minimum °C (°F)	−3.0 (26.6)	−2.7 (27.1)	−0.3 (31.5)	2.7 (36.9)	6.8 (44.2)	10.2 (50.4)	12.2 (54.0)	11.8 (53.2)	8.3 (46.9)	4.8 (40.6)	1.0 (33.8)	−1.7 (28.9)	4.2 (39.6)
Mean minimum °C (°F)	−13.8 (7.2)	−11.8 (10.8)	−7.4 (18.7)	−3.8 (25.2)	0.5 (32.9)	4.3 (39.7)	6.9 (44.4)	6.2 (43.2)	2.3 (36.1)	−2.3 (27.9)	−6.2 (20.8)	−10.9 (12.4)	−16.2 (2.8)
Record low °C (°F)	−22.9 (−9.2)	−22.5 (−8.5)	−18.4 (−1.1)	−10.7 (12.7)	−3.7 (25.3)	−0.9 (30.4)	3.1 (37.6)	2.1 (35.8)	−1.5 (29.3)	−8.0 (17.6)	−15.7 (3.7)	−21.2 (−6.2)	−22.9 (−9.2)
Average precipitation mm (inches)	57.5 (2.26)	48.9 (1.93)	60.6 (2.39)	48.1 (1.89)	77.5 (3.05)	89.5 (3.52)	97.2 (3.83)	94.4 (3.72)	70.4 (2.77)	62.9 (2.48)	58.2 (2.29)	62.6 (2.46)	827.7 (32.59)
Average extreme snow depth cm (inches)	16.4 (6.5)	15.6 (6.1)	5.5 (2.2)	2.7 (1.1)	0 (0)	0 (0)	0 (0)	0 (0)	0 (0)	0.7 (0.3)	6.0 (2.4)	11.1 (4.4)	26.0 (10.2)
Average precipitation days (≥ 0.1 mm)	17.2	15.8	16.2	13.2	15.1	15.2	16.1	14.5	13.9	15.0	15.2	18.2	185.4
Average relative humidity (%)	80.2	77.4	75.2	69.8	70.9	71.5	70.9	71.6	77.9	80.0	82.7	82.2	75.9
Mean monthly sunshine hours	61.3	78.4	115.2	143.0	185.2	185.5	195.1	183.7	139.5	118.9	58.2	56.2	1,520.5
Source: DWD Open Data

== Politics ==
=== Mayors ===
The following chart shows the mayors and the periods of office.

Name	Period of office; note
Maximilian Kretschmar	14. February 1889 – 1913
Arthur Hoffmann	1913–1934; since 1924 First mayor
Franz Pillmayer (NSDAP)	1934–1939
Paul Geipel	1940–1945
Max Ziegler	May–June 1945; temporary
Hermann Graf	June- August 1945; temporary
Friedrich Lange	August 1945-January 1946
Alfred Franz	February 1946-September 1946
(Dr.) Hennig	September–November 1946
Johannes Heinz	December 1946-October 1949

Name	Period of office; note
Otto Schmutzler	November 1949-January 1950
Max Ebert	February–December 1950
Felix Unger	December 1950 – 1952
Kurt Müller	1952–1954
Otto Stange	1954–1956
Emil Schuster	1956–1970
Gotthold Scheinpflug	1970–1988
Horst Uhlig	1988-20 June 1990
Emanuel Klan (CDU)	1990-31 August 1999
Heinrich Wetter	31 December 1998 – 31 October 1999; official of the district councilor
Heinrich Kohl (CDU)	since 1 November 1999

=== Town council ===
- CDU/FDP: 7 members
- FBA/SPD: 5 members
- PDS: 5 members
- FWA: 3 members
- LdU: 2 members

== Economy and infrastructure ==
The town has a station at the junction of the Zwickau–Schwarzenberg line and the Chemnitz–Adorf line. It is served by Regionalbahn trains, operated by Erzgebirgsbahn (a subsidiary of Deutsche Bahn) between Zwickau and Johanngeorgenstadt and by Tram-trains, operated by City-Bahn Chemnitz between Aue and Burgstädt.

=== Coat of arms ===
The town's arms show two wooden bridges, one over the other, in gold on blue over a wavy silver watery surface, each bridge with two little flags on the balustrade flying left.

== Famous people ==
=== Honorary citizens ===
- Ernst Papst (b. 1843), factory owner, founder of the public gymnastic club and the volunteer fire brigade
- Fürst Otto von Bismarck (1815–1898), Imperial Chancellor, honorary citizen since 1 April 1895
- Gustav Hiltmann (1850–1931) joint owner of the Hiltmann & Lorenz (HILO) factory with great dedication to his homeland, town councillor honorary citizen since 1920
- Emil Teubner (1877–1958), woodcarver and sculptor
- Peter Koch, company director of Nickelhütte Aue GmbH (nickelworks)
- Alexander Bauer, former partner in the Curt Bauer KG factory

=== Sons and daughters of the town ===
- Melchior Lotter (1470–1549), book printer and publisher
- Kurt Teubner (1903–1990), painter and graphic artist
- Ernst Hecker (1907–1983), painter, lithographer and impressionist
- Dietmar Vettermann (b. 1957), chief mayor of the city of Zwickau
- Thomas Colditz (b. 1957), CDU politician, member of the Saxony Landtag
- Max Poepel (1896–1966), town councillor and, from 1940 to early 1945, Deputy Lord Mayor. Prevented bridges being blown during US advance in World War II.

=== Other celebrities ===
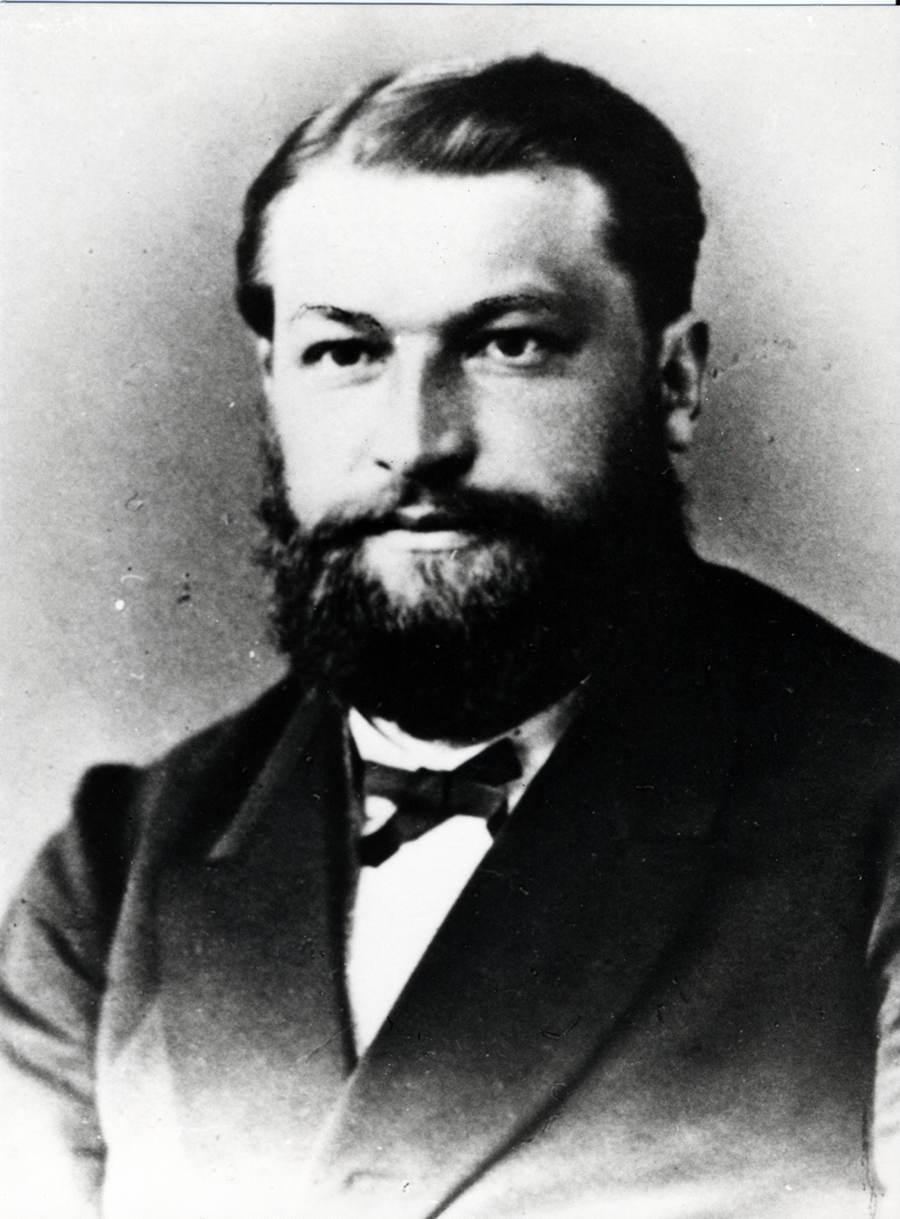
Clemens Winkler around 1875

- Ernst August Geitner (1783–1852), chemist, physician, botanist and inventor of German silver, founded Auerhammer German silver works in 1829, forerunner of today's Auerhammer Metallwerk GmbH thereby laying the groundwork for the town's development into a centre for German silver cutlery manufacture.
- Clemens Winkler (1838–1904), German chemist, discoverer of the chemical element germanium, spent his youth in the constituent community of Niederpfannenstiel; Aue's Gymnasium is named for him.

For name origin: German placename etymology

== Gallery ==
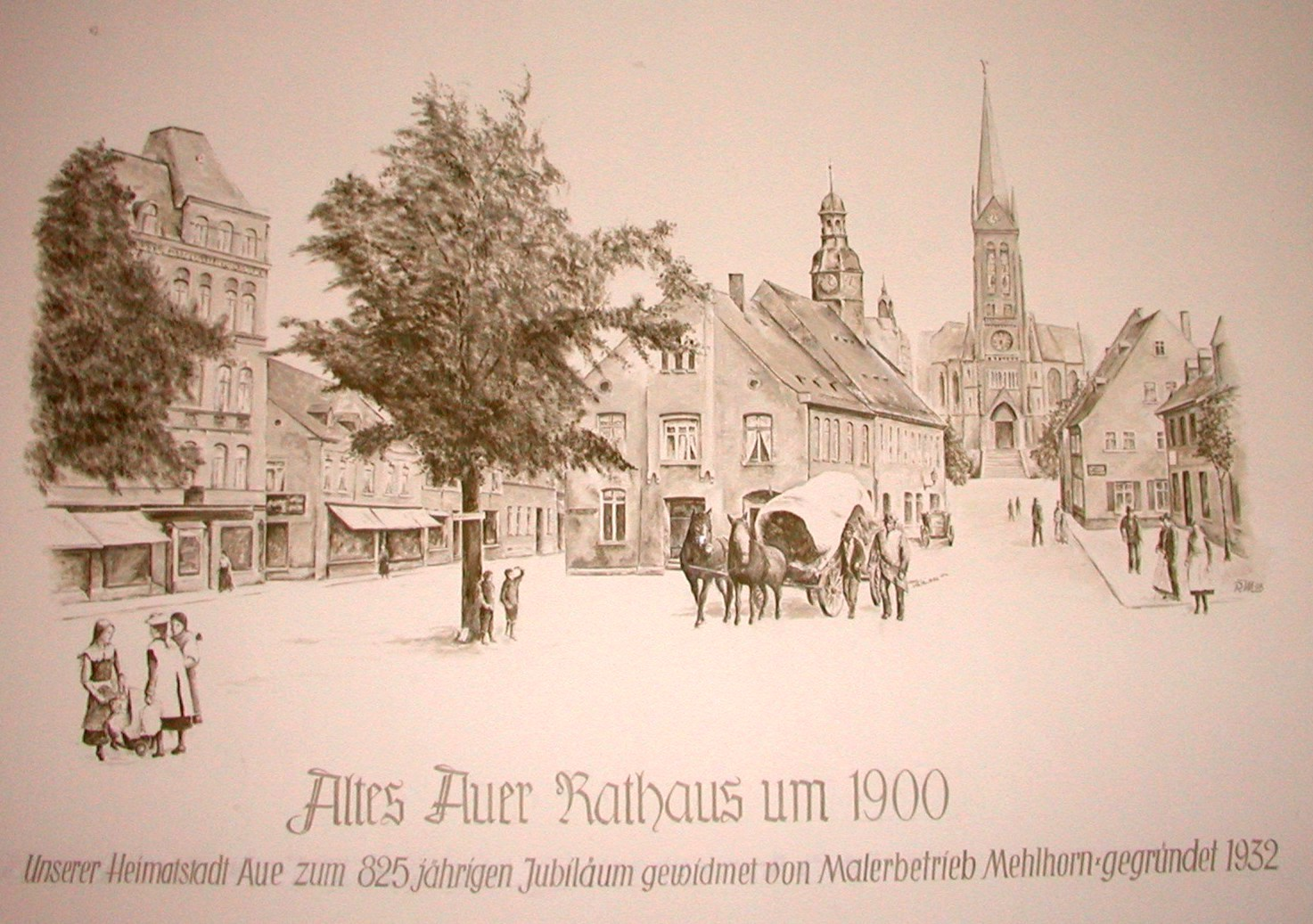
"Altes Rathaus", "Nicolaikirche" and Marketplace, ca 1900

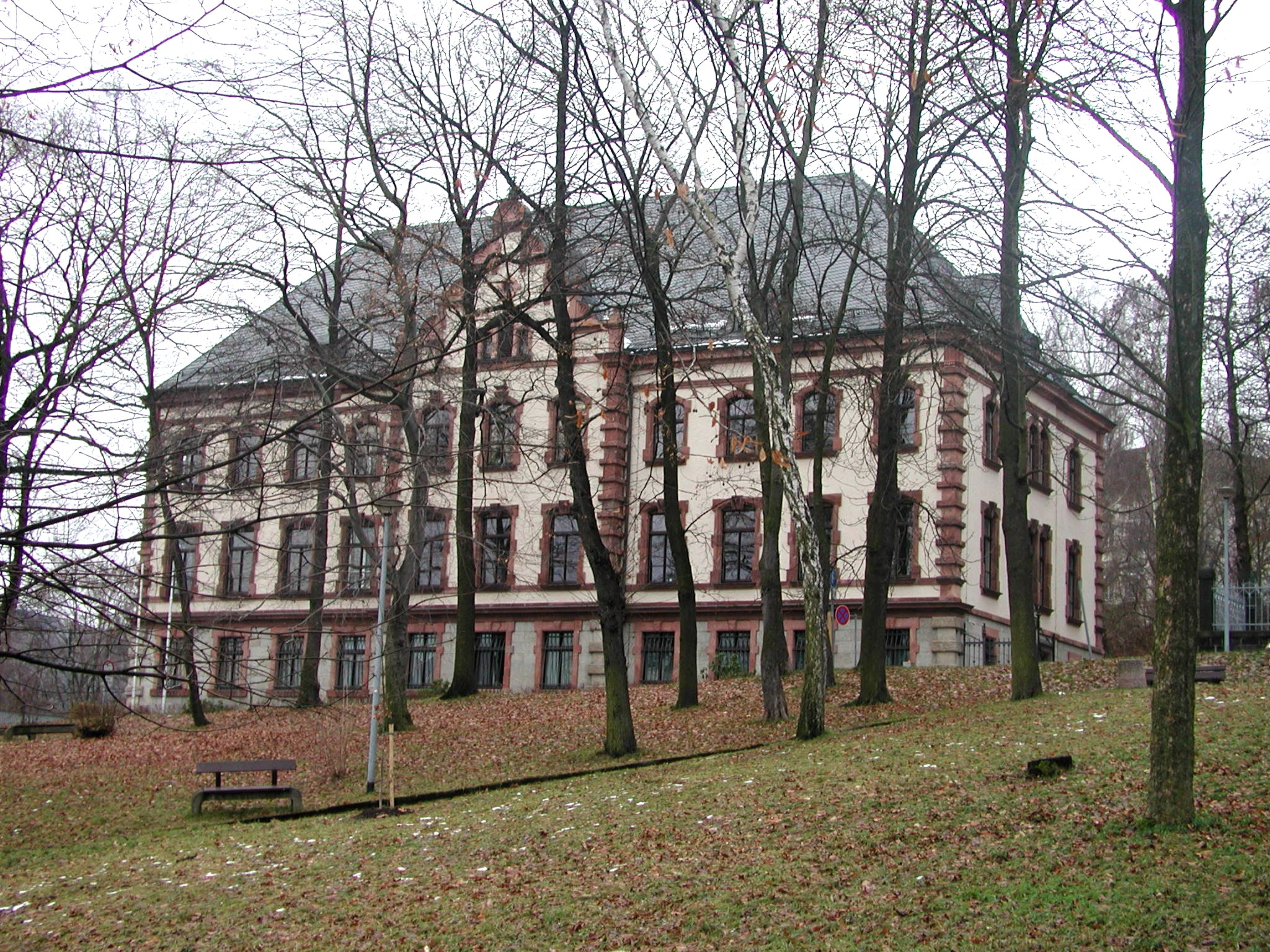
Former Amtsgericht in Aue

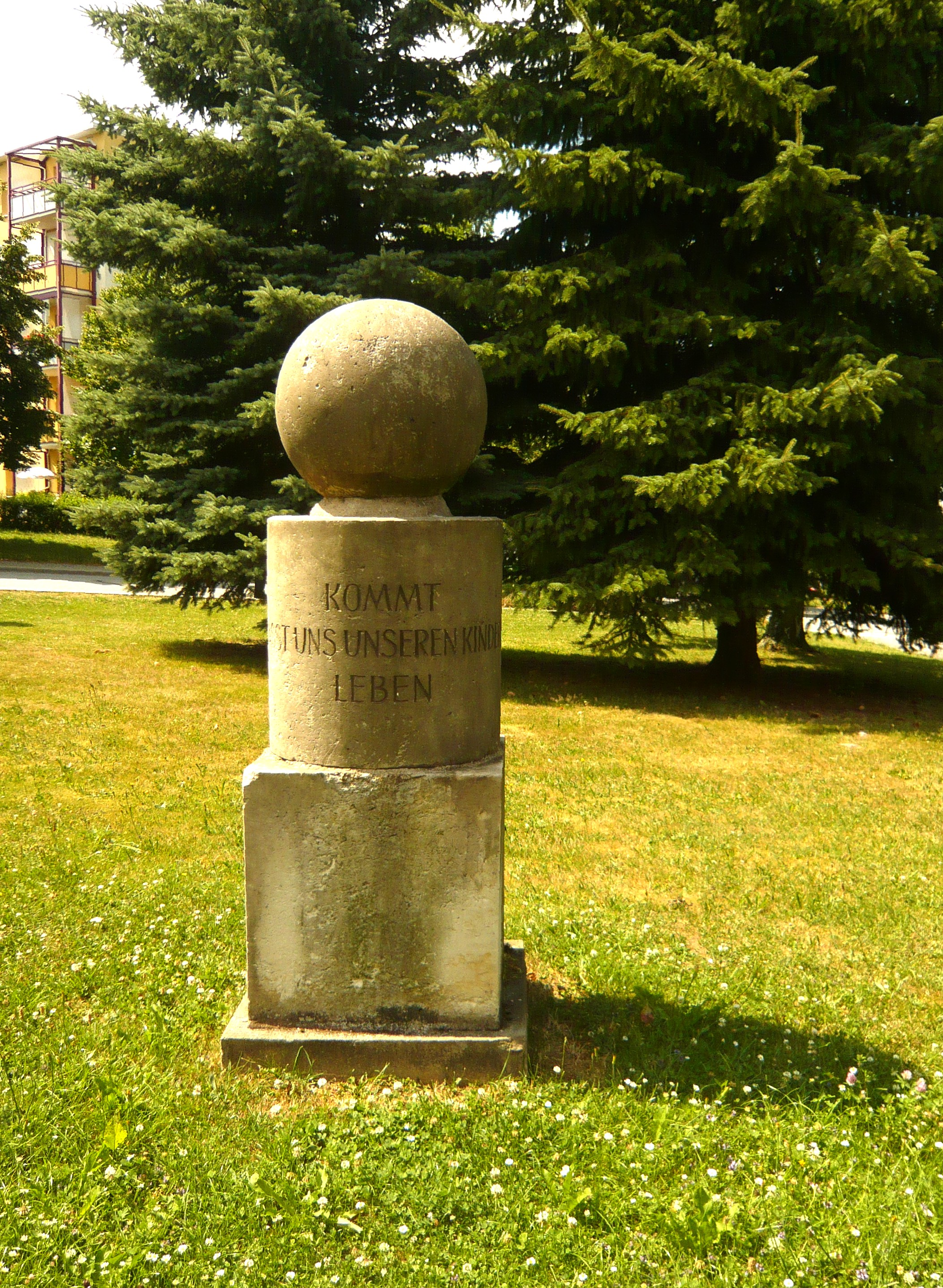
Memorial for Friedrich Fröbel

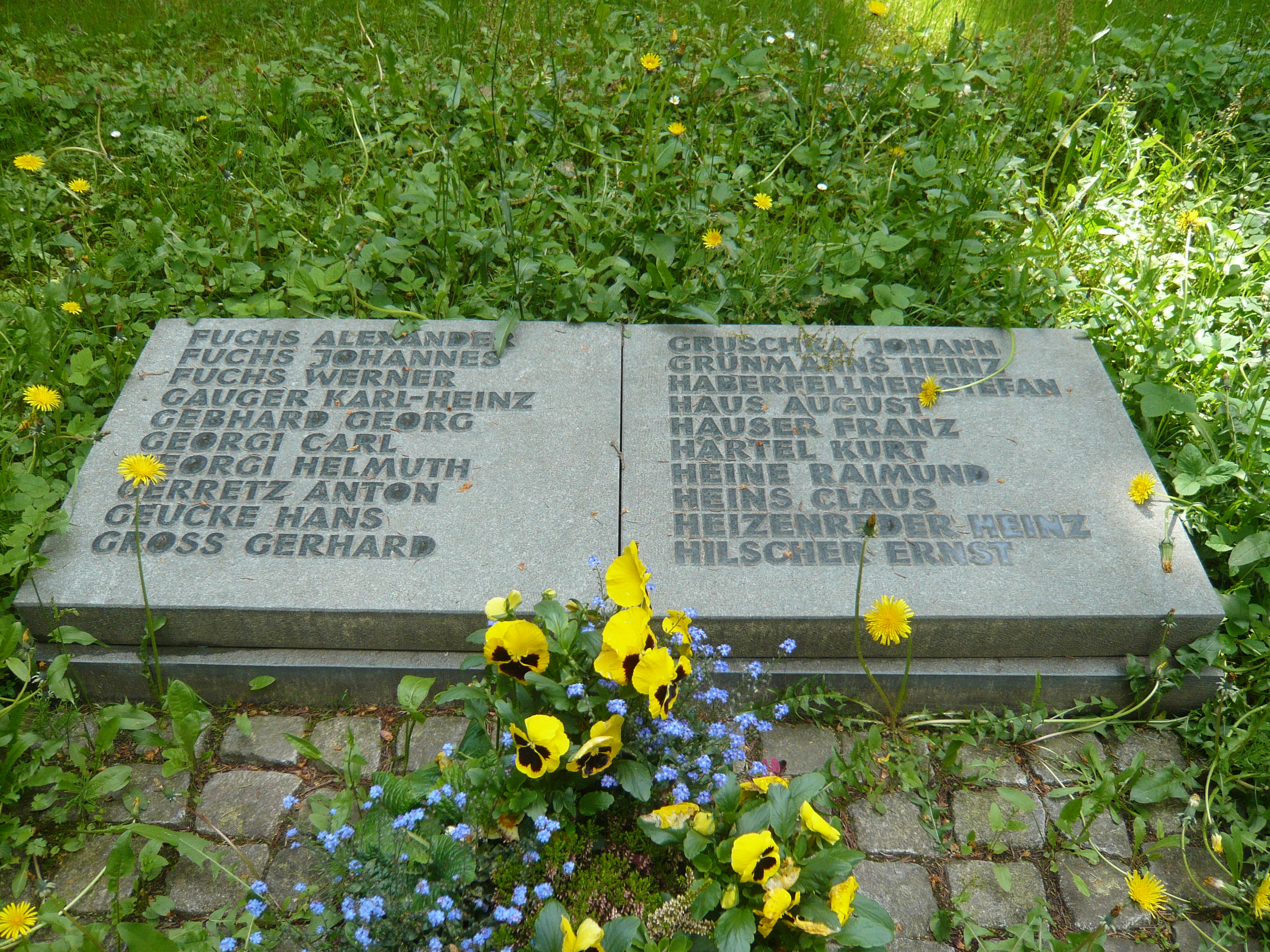
World War II memorial at the St. Nicolai cemetery

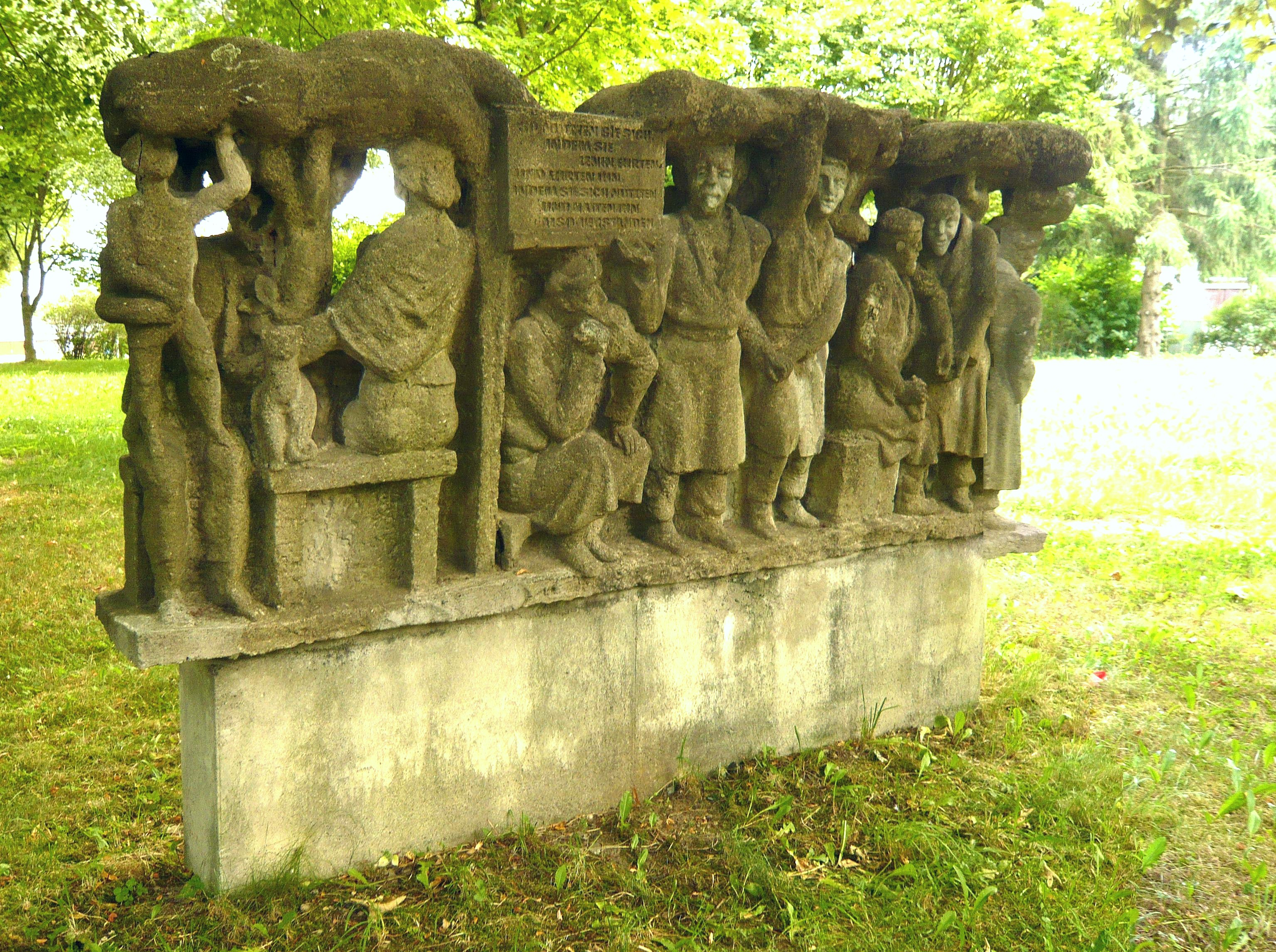
Die Teppichweber (The carpetweavers) after a poem from Bertolt Brecht, by Kujan-Bulak
