= Pöhlwasser =

River in Germany

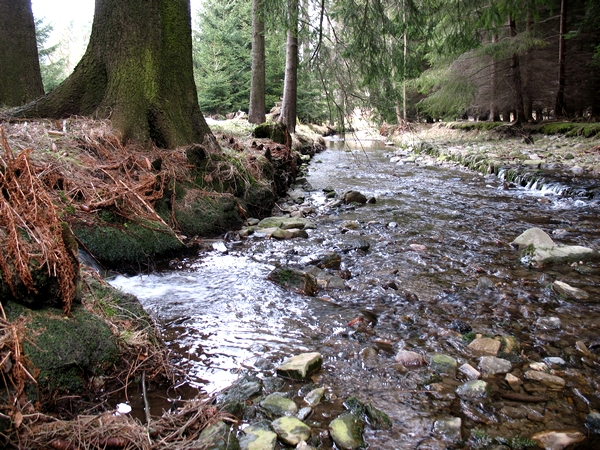
- The Pöhlwasser between the districts Ehrenzipfel and Rittersgrün of Breitenbrunn

Location
- Country: Germany
- States: Saxony

Physical characteristics
- Mouth
  - location: Große Mittweida
  - coordinates: 50.5308°N 12.8181°E

Basin features
- Progression: Große Mittweida→ Schwarzwasser→ Zwickauer Mulde→ Mulde→ Elbe→ North Sea

The Pöhlwasser is a river of Saxony, Germany. It is a left tributary of the Große Mittweida, which it joins near Schwarzenberg.

== See also ==
- List of rivers of Saxony
