= Knochen (hill) =

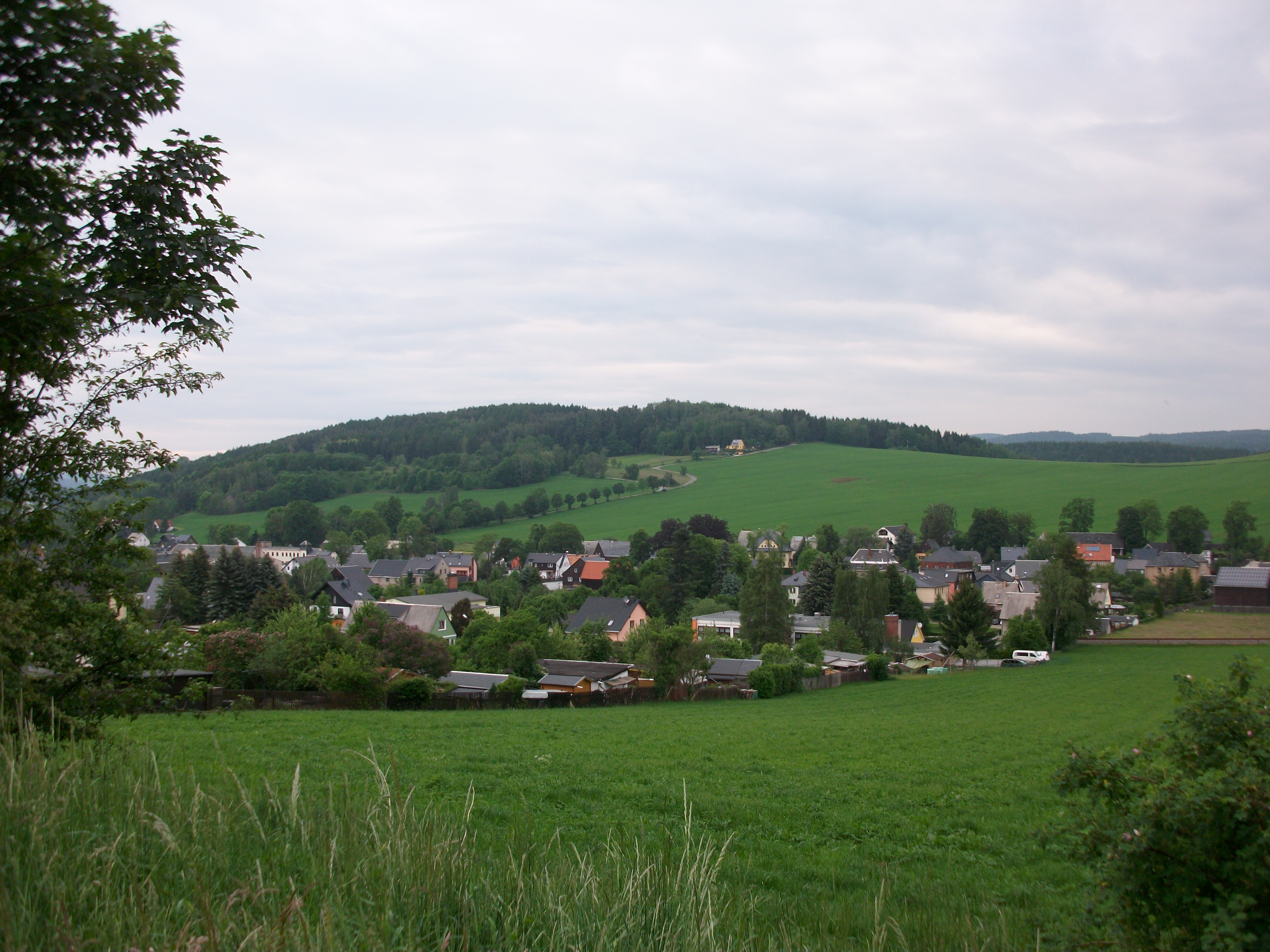

Highest point
- Elevation: 551.4 m (1,809 ft)
- Coordinates: 50°32′19″N 12°49′17″E

Geography
- Location within Saxony
- Location: Saxony (Germany)
- Parent range: Ore Mountains

The Knochen is a monadnock between the village of Raschau-Markersbach and the town of Schwarzenberg in the Saxon part of the Ore Mountains in southeastern Germany. Its summit lies 551.4 metres above sea level.

== Description ==
The heights rise about 100 metres above the floors of the northwards-running Schwarzbach valley and the Große Mittweida valley to the south. The hill contains several lodes and deposits of ore. Within them, non-ferrous metal skarns occur - some forming gravel deposits and bearing pyrites - as well as lodes of a bismuth-cobalt-nickel-silver formation.

As early as the 17th century the Knochen was opened up by numerous pits. Among the most important mines were the Gottes Seegen, St. Paulus and Drei Brüder pits, as well as the Allerheiligen-Fundgrube, from which silver, bismuth and cobalt ores were extracted in 1713. Besides the mines, in the middle of the 18th century a vitriol and sulphur works was established. From 1818 it also extracted arsenic using 5 furnaces, which was sold to paint factories in Hamburg, France and Austria. After the Allerheiligen works in Raschau was closed in the face of state competition from Freiberg in 1871, it was re-opened at Beierfeld in 1876.

== Literature ==
- Siegfried Sieber: Um Aue, Schwarzenberg und Johanngeorgenstadt. Akademie-Verlag, Berlin 1972, pp. 89ff.
