= Arthur Vogel =

Arthur Vogel may refer to:

- Arthur Vogel (chemist) (1905–1966), British chemist
- Arthur Vogel (photographer) (1868–1962), German merchant, photographer and publisher
- Arthur A. Vogel (1924–2012), bishop
