= Schwarzbach (Große Mittweida) =

River in Germany

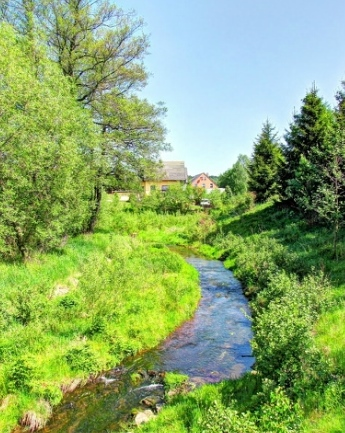

Location
- Country: Germany
- State: Saxony

Physical characteristics
- Mouth
  - location: Schwarzenberg
  - coordinates: 50.5404°N 12.7979°E

Basin features
- Progression: Große Mittweida→ Schwarzwasser→ Zwickauer Mulde→ Mulde→ Elbe→ North Sea

Schwarzbach (German pronunciation: [ˈʃvaʁtsˌbax]) is a river of Saxony, Germany.

The Schwarzbach is a left tributary of the Große Mittweida.

== See also ==
- List of rivers of Saxony
