= Fällbach =

River in Germany

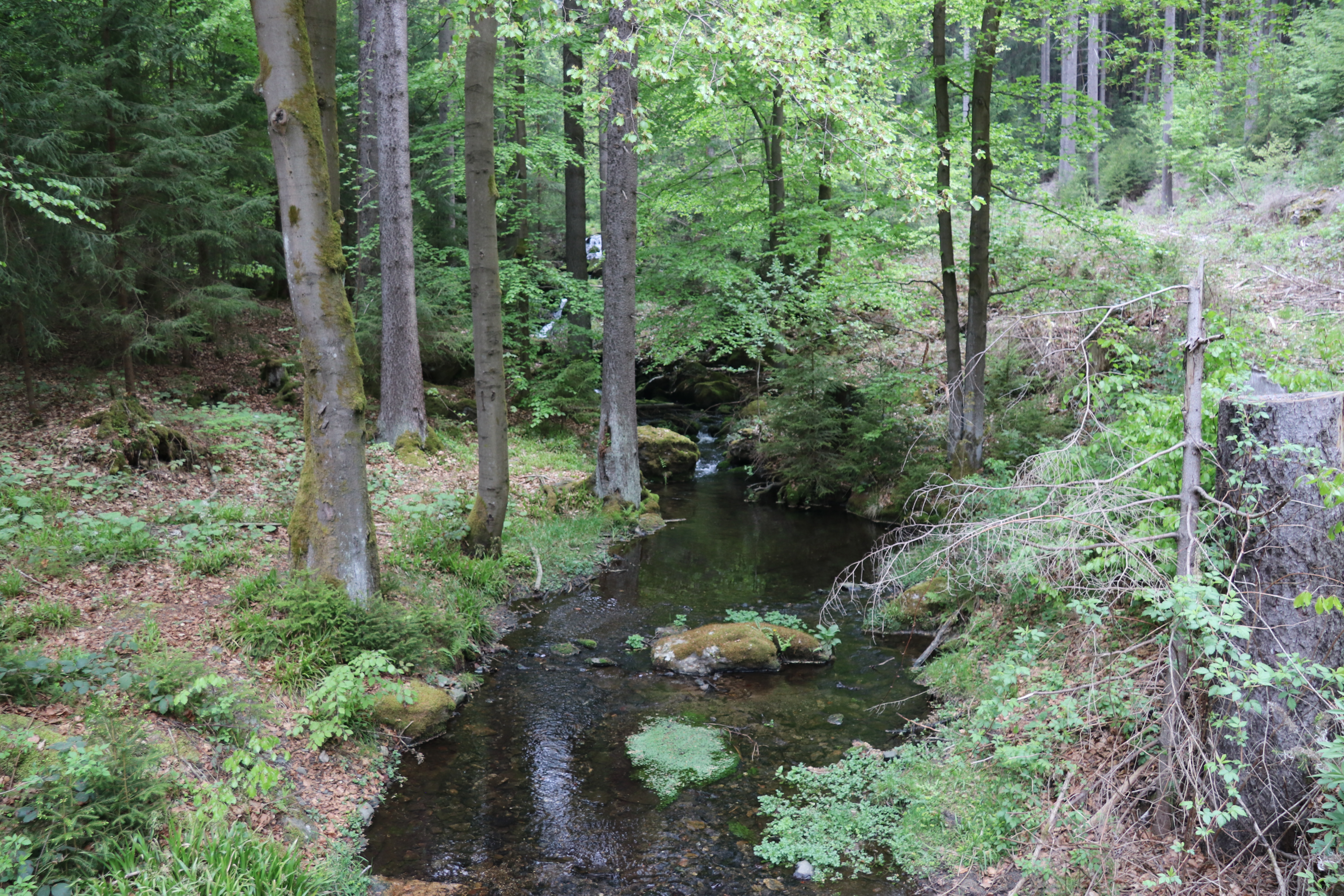

Location
- Country: Germany
- State: Saxony

Physical characteristics
- Mouth
  - location: Schwarzwasser
  - coordinates: 50.4942°N 12.7405°E

Basin features
- Progression: Schwarzwasser→ Zwickauer Mulde→ Mulde→ Elbe→ North Sea

The Fällbach is a river of Saxony, Germany. It is a left tributary of the Schwarzwasser, which it joins near Breitenbrunn.

== See also ==
- List of rivers of Saxony
