= Barony of Schwarzenberg =

Administrative territorial entity in Saxony

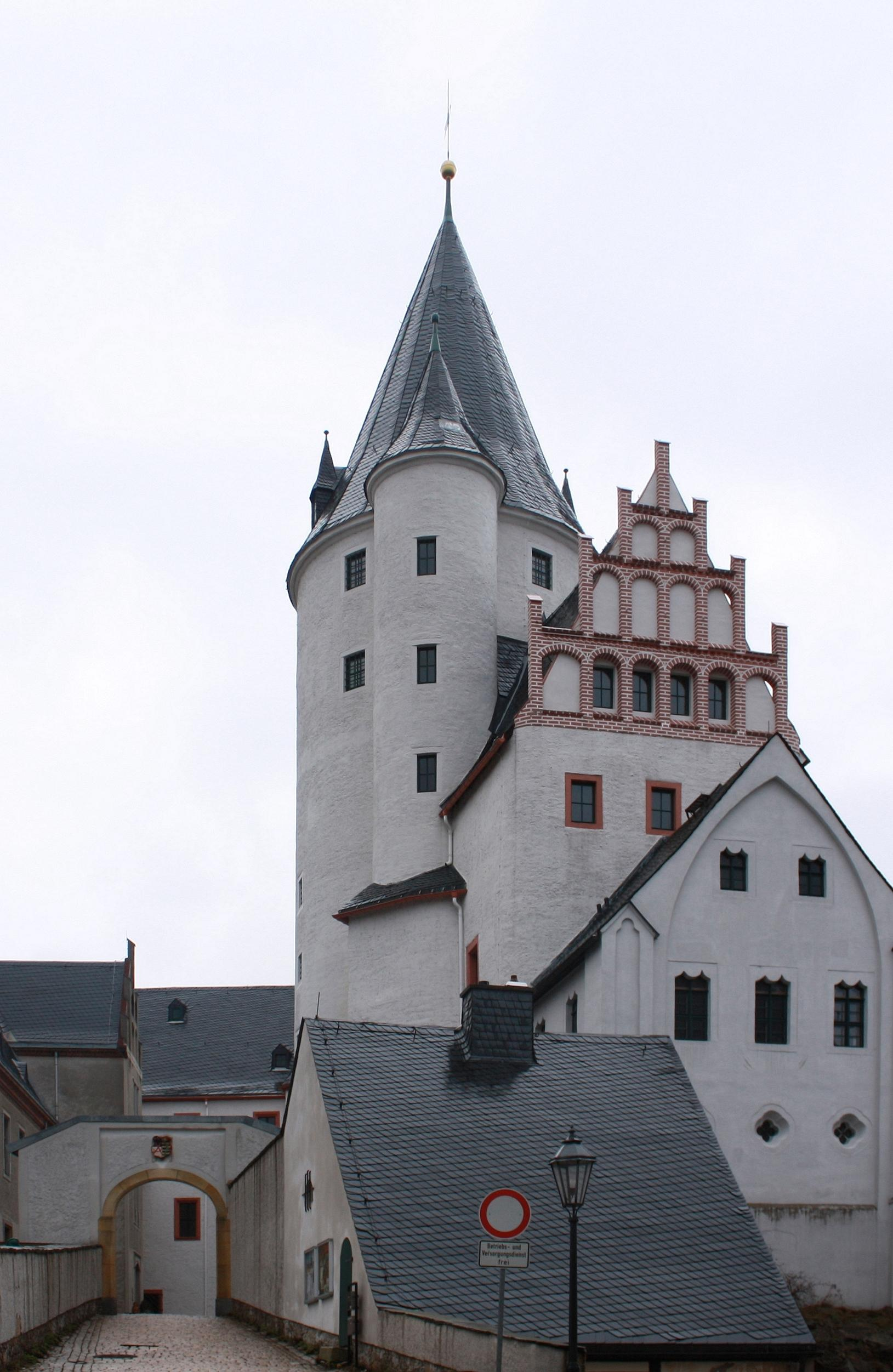
Schwarzenberg Castle: heart of the barony

The Barony of Schwarzenberg (German: Herrschaft Schwarzenberg) was a domain that emerged in the middle of the 12th century in the Saxon Ore Mountains in central Europe. It continued to exist following its acquisition by John Frederick the Magnanimous in 1533 as an administrative unit of the Electorate of Saxony under the name of Amt Schwarzenberg and acted as the regional focal point, until the end of the Saxon Amt constitution, for the collection of baronial contributions and coordination of socage, for law and order and military service.

== Geography ==
The barony was bordered by the Vogtland region to the east, and extended south into the forests on the ridge of the Western Ore Mountains from the Auersberg mountain to the Fichtelberg, and was bounded by the rivers Schwarzwasser, Pöhlwasser and Große Mittweida. To the south, it was bounded by the watershed. The centre of the territory was the Fort of Schwarzenberg, first mentioned in 1212 as a castrum.

== Sources ==
- Walter Fröbe: Herrschaft und Stadt Schwarzenberg bis zum 16. Jahrhundert, Schwarzenberg 1930/37.
- Karlheinz Blaschke, Uwe Jäschke: Kursächsischer Ämteratlas 1790. Gumnior, 2009. ISBN 3-937386-14-9
- Johann Christian Crell: Die in Chursachsen jeztlebende Amtleute und Amtsverweser. Leipzig, 1722.
