= Fallbach =

Fallbach may refer to:

- Fallbach, Austria, a town in the district of Mistelbach, Lower Austria
- Fallbach Waterfall, a waterfall in the Maltatal valley in the Austrian Alps
- Fallbach (Inn, Baumkirchen), a river of Austria, tributary of the Inn in Baumkirchen
- Fallbach (Inn, Innsbruck), a river of Austria, tributary of the Inn in Innsbruck
- Fallbach (Kinzig), a river of Hesse, Germany
- Fällbach, a river of Saxony, Germany
