= Arthur Vogel (photographer) =

German merchant and publisher (1868–1962)

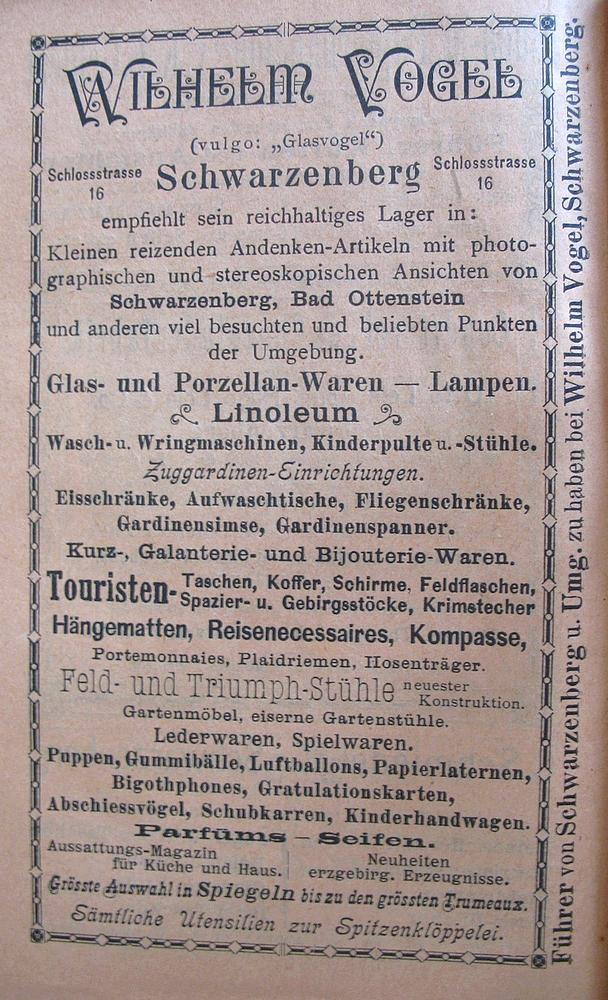
1898 travel guide advertise- ment in which Vogel promotes photographs and stereograms of Schwarzenberg and Ottenstein.

Wilhelm Arthur Vogel (2 April 1868 – 4 March 1962) was a German merchant, photographer and publisher of Ore Mountain picture postcards which form an important part of the heritage of the Ore Mountains.

== Life and works ==
Vogel was born on 2 April 1868 in Schwarzenberg. After attending primary school in Schwarzenberg and the trade school in Chemnitz Arthur Vogel went into the fashion accessory business of his father, Fürchtegott Wilhelm Vogel, at Schwarzenberg's Schloßstraße 4. He kept the company name of Wilhelm Vogel when he took it over himself in 1899. In addition to the range of goods sold by his father, which included bobbin lace yarn and products of all kinds, he built another mainstay as a fine-art publisher. Embarking on numerous walking tours throughout the local area he took photographs of the countryside, local culture and places of natural beauty with his camera. Over the years he created several thousand picture postcards of his home area, which contributed to the increase in tourism of the Ore Mountains. He was also a member of the Ore Mountain Club.

He died on 4 March 1962 in Schwarzenberg.

== Sources ==
- Auer Beschäftigungsinitiative (pub.): Kleine Chronik großer Meister Vol. 3, Aue, 2003, p. 85–89
