= Ottenstein (Schwarzenberg) =

Mountain in Germany

Coordinates: 50°32′24″N 12°47′17″E

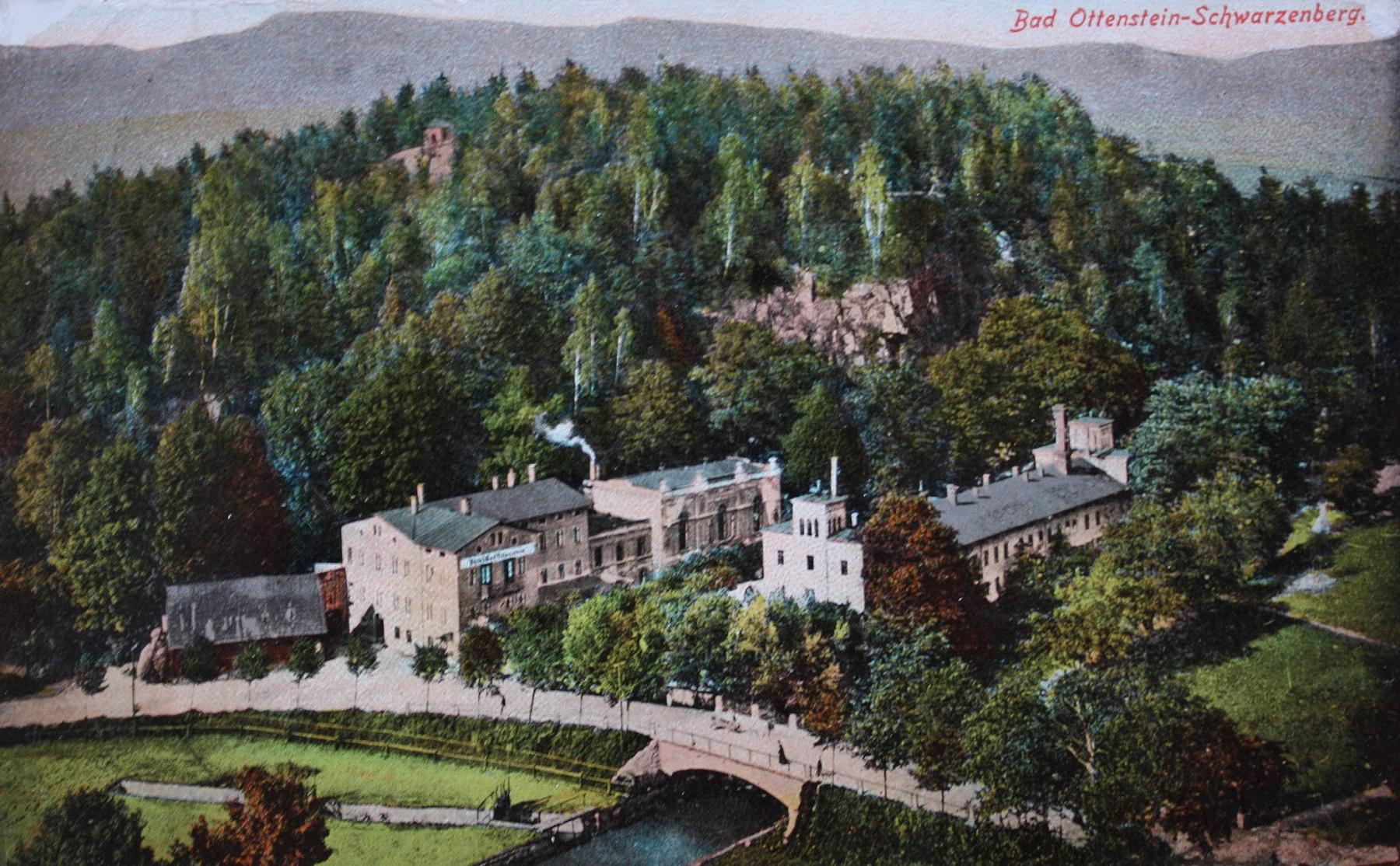
- View of Ottenstein

Highest point
- Elevation: 474 m (1,555 ft)

Geography
- Location: Saxony, Germany

Ottenstein is a mountain of Saxony, southeastern Germany.

As part of the Ottenstein Plateau (German: Ottensteiner Hochebene or Ottensteiner Hochfläche) it is part of the Lower Saxon Weser Uplands and lies between Bodenwerder and Bad Pyrmont.

Compared with the surrounding area of the Weser and Emmer valleys, the plateau is a largely open plain, about 200 m higher, and which lies between 250 and 350 metres above sea level. Its highest elevation is 376 m above sea level (NN) and lies not far from the village of Eichenborn.Ottenstein Plateau
