= Arthur Vogel (chemist) =

Author and educator (1905–1966)

- Born: 22 December 1905; Dębica, Poland
- Died: 1966
- Education: Queen Mary University of London
- Occupations: academic; author
- Organisations: University College London; Imperial College London; Hartley University College; Woolwich Polytechnic

Arthur Israel Vogel FRIC (22 December 1905 – 1966) was a British chemist known for his Chemistry textbooks. He became the head of the chemistry department at Woolwich Polytechnic at the age of 27.

== Academic career ==
Vogel's first job was at Queen Mary University of London, continuing from his BSc, working with Professor J. R. Partington and achieving an MSc. After a short spell at University College London, he joined Imperial College London and the research school of Sir Jocelyn Field Thorpe. During his time there he received a D.Sc for his research on surface tension, electrochemistry, organic synthesis and sulphur chemistry.

After a short departure from academia with a foray into industry, Vogel joined the Hartley University College in 1930 as a lecturer of science. Two years later he joined the Woolwich Polytechinic as the Lecturer-in-Charge at 27 years old, a role that evolved into the Head of Chemistry. During this time the Polytechnic became an Institution with Recognised Teachers of the University of London. During the 1940s Vogel formed the Woolwich Polytechnic Chemical Society, which organised lectures with world renowned scientists.

== Text books ==
Vogel was hugely influential with his textbooks making practical chemistry text available globally.

Vogel's textbooks included:

- Textbook of Qualitative Chemical Analysis (1937)
- Textbook of Quantitative Chemical Analysis (1939)
- Practical Organic Chemistry (1948)

These works were revised and translated in numerous editions and so became classics in the field. After Vogel died, further revisions were made by new authors. For example, the Textbook of Qualitative Chemical Analysis continued as the Textbook of macro and semimicro qualitative inorganic analysis with a new edition by G. Svehla in 1979.

== Selected studies ==
- 1933 - Syntheses of cyclic compounds. Part X. The thermal decomposition of substituted glutaric acids. Part I. ββ-Dimethylglutaric, cyclopentane- and cyclohexane-1 : 1-diacetic acids, and the mechanism of the reaction (J. Chem. Soc., 1933, 1028-1031, doi.org/10.1039/JR9330001028)
- 1934 - Physical properties and chemical constitution. Part I. Esters of normal dibasic acids and of substituted malonic acids (J. Chem. Soc., 1934, 333-341, doi.org/10.1039/JR9340000333)
- 1934 - Physical properties and chemical constitution. Part II. Esters of ββ-substituted glutaric acids (J. Chem. Soc., 1934, 1758-1765, doi.org/10.1039/JR9340001758)
- 1938 - Physical properties and chemical constitution. Part III. cycloPentane, cyclohexane, cycloheptane, and some derivatives. The multiplanar structure of the methylcyclohexane ring (J. Chem. Soc., 1938, 1323-1338, doi.org/10.1039/JR9380001323)
- 1943 - Physical properties and chemical constitution. Part VIII. Alkyl chlorides, bromides, and iodides (J. Chem. Soc., 1943, 636-647, doi.org/10.1039/JR9430000636)
- 1946 - Physical properties and chemical constitution. Part IX. Aliphatic hydrocarbons (J. Chem. Soc., 1946, 133-139, doi.org/10.1039/JR9460000133)
- 1948 - Physical properties and chemical constitution. Part X. n-Alkylbenzenes (J. Chem. Soc., 1948, 607-610, doi.org/10.1039/JR9480000607)
- 1948 - Physical properties and chemical constitution. Part XI. Ketones (J. Chem. Soc., 1948, 610-615, doi.org/10.1039/JR9480000610)
- 1948 - Physical properties and chemical constitution. Part XII. Eithers and acetals (J. Chem. Soc., 1948, 616-624, doi.org/10.1039/JR9480000616)
- 1948 - Physical properties and chemical constitution. Part XIII. Aliphatic carboxylic esters (J. Chem. Soc., 1948, 624-644, doi.org/10.1039/JR9480000624)
- 1948 - Physical properties and chemical constitution. Part XIV. The parachors and the refractivities of the halogens (J. Chem. Soc., 1948, 644-654, doi.org/10.1039/JR9480000644)
- 1948 - Physical properties and chemical constitution. Part XV. The phenyl group (J. Chem. Soc., 1948, 654-658, doi.org/10.1039/JR9480000654)
- 1948 - Physical properties and chemical constitution. Part XIX. Five-membered and six-membered carbon rings (J. Chem. Soc., 1948, 1809-1813, doi.org/10.1039/JR9480001809)
- 1948 - Physical properties and chemical constitution. Part XX. Aliphatic alcohols and acids (J. Chem. Soc., 1948, 1814-1819, doi.org/10.1039/JR9480001814)
- 1948 - Physical properties and chemical constitution. Part XXI. Aliphatic thiols, sulphides, and disulphides (J. Chem. Soc., 1948, 1820-1825, doi.org/10.1039/JR9480001820)
- 1948 - Physical properties and chemical constitution. Part XXII. Some primary, secondary, and tertiary amines(J. Chem. Soc., 1948, 1825-1833, doi.org/10.1039/JR9480001825)
- 1948 - Physical properties and chemical constitution. Part XXIII. Miscellaneous compounds. Investigation of the so-called co-ordinate or dative link in esters of oxy-acids and in nitro-paraffins by molecular refractivity determinations. atomic, structural, and group parachors and refractivities (J. Chem. Soc., 1948, 1833-1855, doi.org/10.1039/JR9480001833)

== Personal life ==
Vogel was born in Dębica (transl. Dembicza), Poland, to an orthodox Jewish family. They emigrated to England in 1908 and lived at Wellclose Square, Tower Hamlets, London. He was educated at Davenant Foundation School in Whitechapel, before studying at Queen Mary University of London, where he graduated with First Class Honours in chemistry.
