= Breitenbrunn, Saxony =

Breitenbrunn
- Municipality
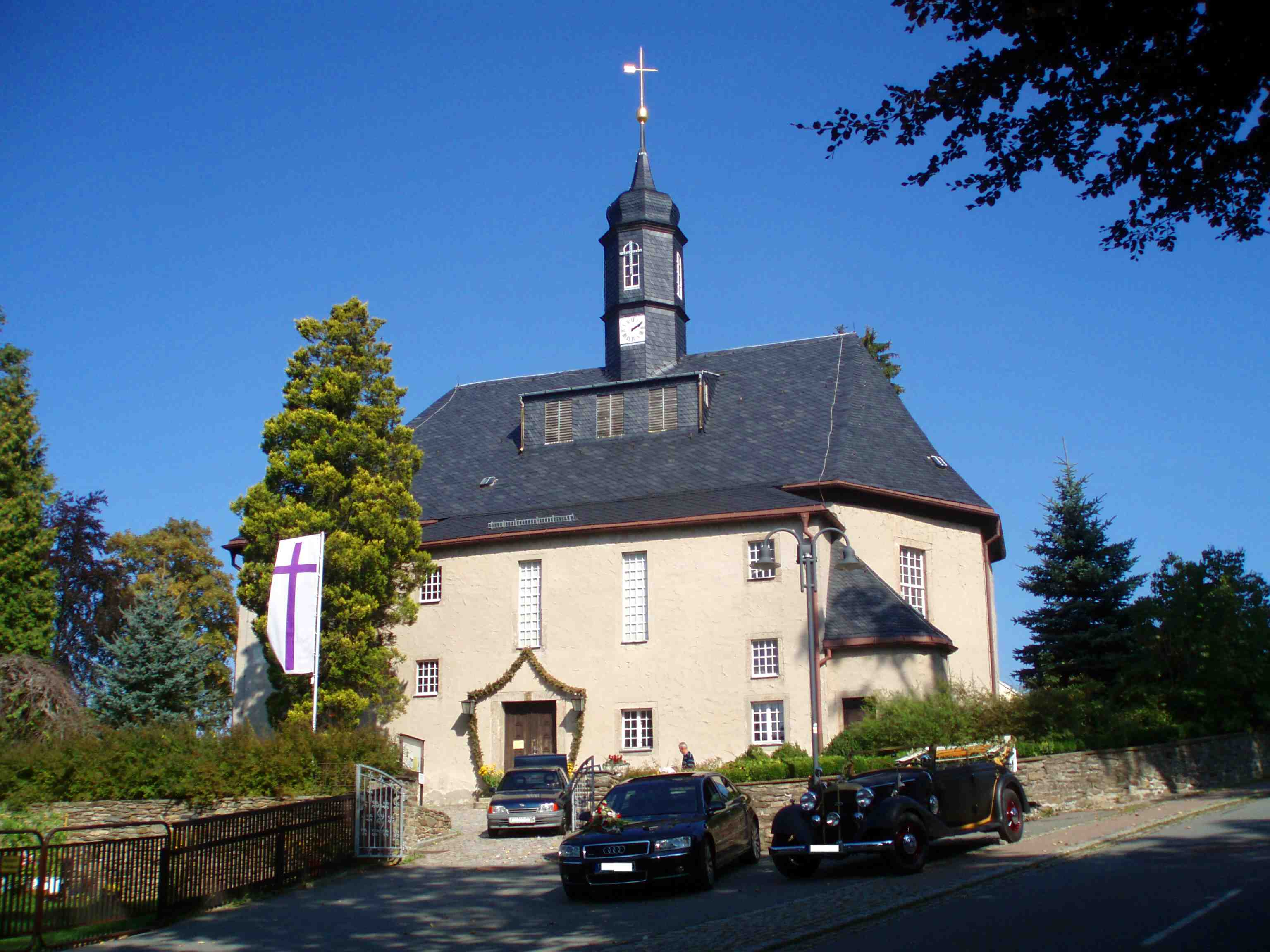
- Church

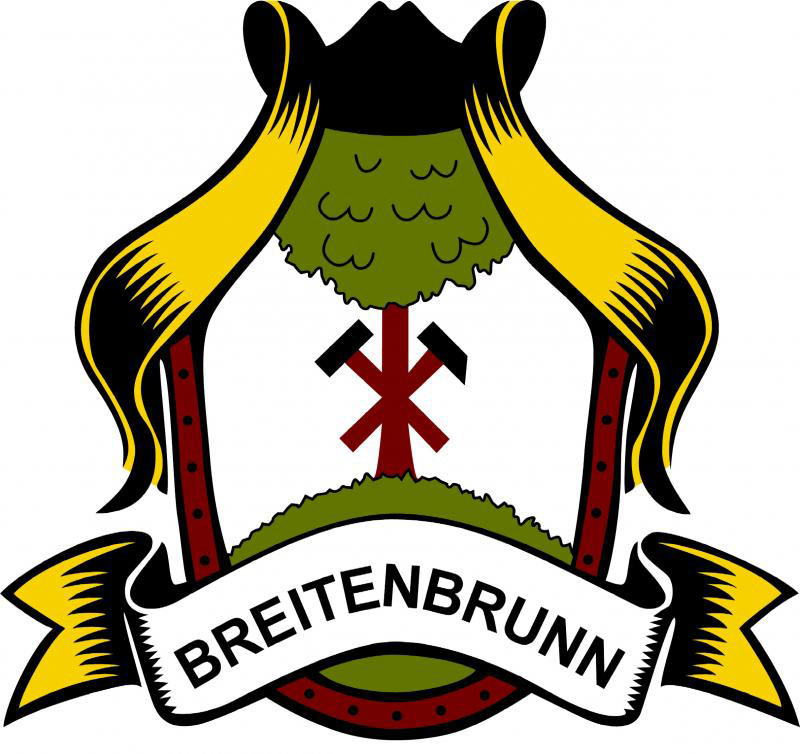
- Coat of arms

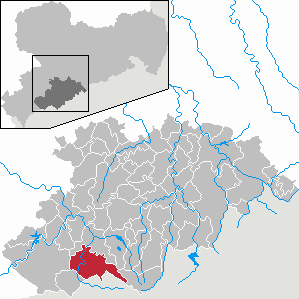
- Location of Breitenbrunn within Erzgebirgskreis district
- Interactive map of Breitenbrunn
- Location within Germany Location within Saxony
- Coordinates: 50°28′29″N 12°46′0″E
- Country: Germany
- State: Saxony
- District: Erzgebirgskreis
- Subdivisions: 8

Government
  - Mayor (2022–29): Lars Dsaak

Area
  - Total: 60.01 km^{2} (23.17 sq mi)
- Elevation: 550–950 m (1,800–3,120 ft)

Population (2025-12-31)
  - Total: 4,684
  - Density: 78.05/km^{2} (202.2/sq mi)
- Time zone: UTC+01:00 (CET)
  - Summer (DST): UTC+02:00 (CEST)
- Postal codes: 08359
- Dialling codes: 037756
- Vehicle registration: ERZ, ANA, ASZ, AU, MAB, MEK, STL, SZB, ZP
- Website: www.breitenbrunn-erzgebirge.de

Breitenbrunn (German pronunciation: [ˈbʁaɪtn̩ˌbʁʊn]) is a municipality in the Ore Mountains in the district of Erzgebirgskreis in the Free State of Saxony in Germany.

== Geography ==
=== Constituent municipalities ===
The municipality consists of Breitenbrunn with Breitenhof, Carolathal, Halbemeile and Rabenberg, Antonsthal with Antonshöhe, Erlabrunn, Steinheidel and Fällbach as well as Rittersgrün and Tellerhäuser.

=== Neighbouring municipalities ===
Bordering on Breitenbrunn are Johanngeorgenstadt, the health resort of Oberwiesenthal and the town of Schwarzenberg, all in the Erzgebirgskreis.

=== Location ===
Breitenbrunn lies on a mountain ridge stretching from the Schwarzwasser Valley on east. It is surrounded by, among other mountains, the Rabenberg and the Sauberg.

== History ==
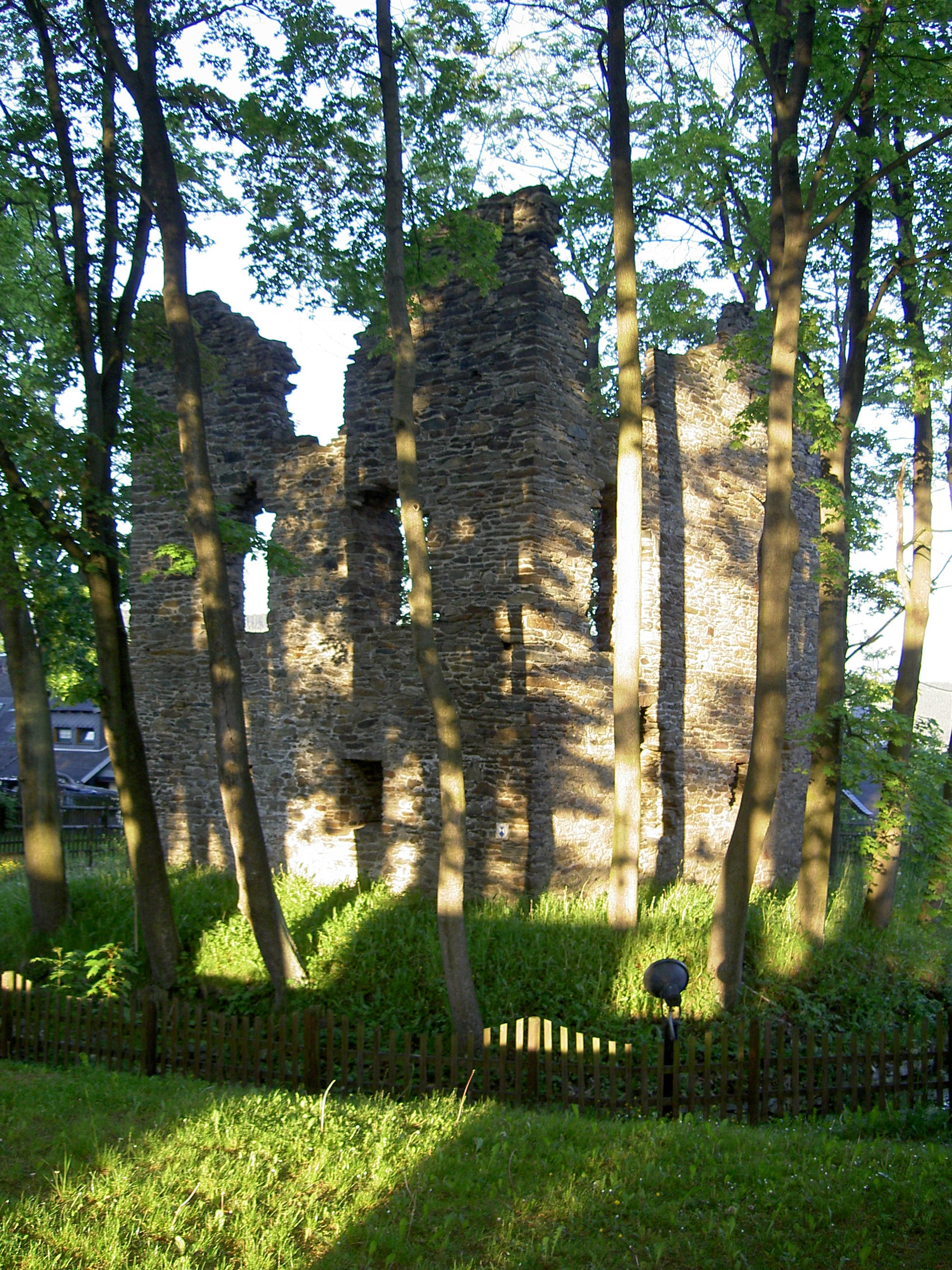
Ruins of the former Electoral hunting lodge

As the highest village in the lordly domain of Schwarzenberg, Breitenbrunn was likely founded only in the 13th century. With the help of vast meadows and sites it can be ascertained that no more than ten families settled here at first. The village had its first documentary mention as “breitinprun” in 1380 in a chronicle of the mountain counts of Leisnig when the mining rights for a tin mine had just been granted. Even before Breitenbrunn’s founding there was over the site of the later settlement a wall with a watchtower, a moat and a small outer defence to defend the Schwarzenberg lordly domain at its southernmost point. Since a spring was found within the moat, the moat was called a “broad spring”, or breiten Brunnen in German, and soon this description was taken up as the place’s name.

Of special historic importance is the Breitenbrunn Papermill found in the town, from which, among others, Johann Sebastian Bach got his notepaper.

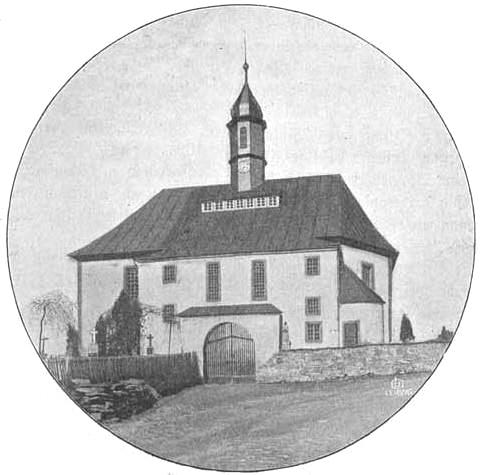
The church at Breitenbrunn about 1900

=== Religion ===
In Catholic times, Breitenbrunn first belonged to the Parish of Schwarzenberg. Later, a chapel consecrated to Saint Peter was built, making Breitenbrunn into a Schwarzenberg branch parish. Even after the Reformation, a dependent relationship was maintained for the time being. Now, however, Breitenbrunn was a daughter municipality of the newly established parish of Grünstädtel.

The village at last got its ecclesiastical independence in 1559, in which same year St. Christopher’s Church (St.-Christophorus-Kirche) was built. Chosen as the location was the village’s upper end to make the walk for churchgoers from the neighbouring, parochially united municipality of Rittersgrün somewhat easier, especially in the winter months.

Today, alongside the Evangelical Lutheran municipality of St. Christopher is an Evangelical Methodist municipality.

=== Population development ===
- 1533 – ca. 200
- 1801 – 2250
- 1834 – 2058
- 1852 – 2943
- 1890 – 2224
- 1910 – 2167
- 1925 – 2113
- 1946 – 2467
- 1956 – 5018
- 1960 – 4259
- 1971 – 3420
- 1999 – 3909
- 2002 – 3879
- 2005 – 3751

Data from 1999 on: Statistisches Landesamt Sachsen

== Politics ==
=== Mayor ===
The municipality’s mayor (Bürgermeister) Ralf Fischer, born in 1955, was re-elected in the latest mayoral election in June 2015.

=== Partnership ===
- (Germany) Nattheim, Baden-Württemberg

== Culture and sightseeing ==
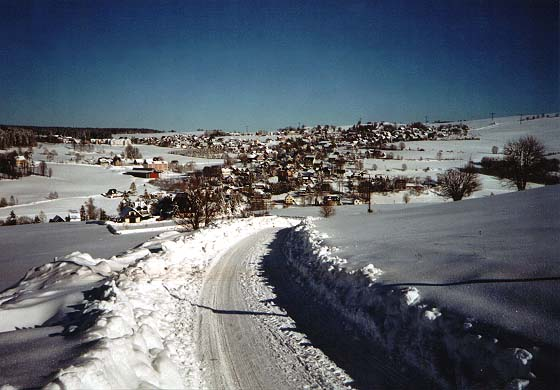
Breitenbrunn in winter

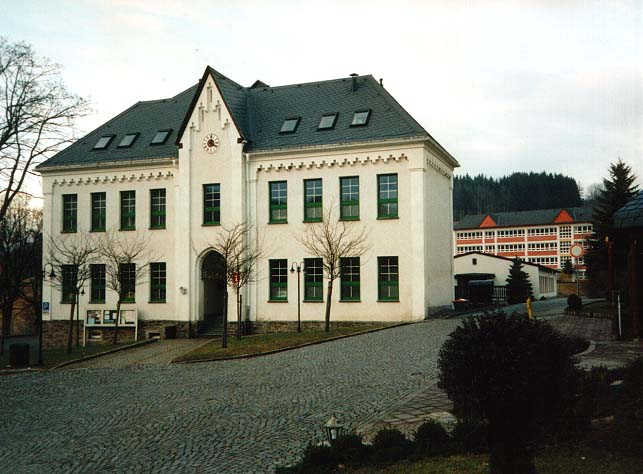
Haus des Gastes and school

- St. Christoph visitors‘ mine
- Silberwäsche Technical Museum in the constituent municipality of Antonsthal
- Christophoruskirche from 1559
- Memorial to the Plague Minister Wolfgang Uhle at cemetery entrance
- Hunting lodge ruins

== Transport ==
The Pannonia Railway had a station in the municipality.

=== Natural memorials ===
- “Himmelswiese” natural monument near the constituent municipality of Halbemeile
- Preißhausbuche, a famous beech tree

=== Education ===
Breitenbrunn is also known for its Staatliche Studienakademie Breitenbrunn (Breitenbrunn State Academy). Here roughly 300 students are taught by the dual principle in the fields of tourism economics, industry and welfare.

=== Sport ===
- Rabenberg Sport and Education Centre (with indoor swimming pool and cross-country ski run)

=== Regular events ===
- Church consecration festival (kermis) in the upper village on the last weekend of August

== Famous people ==
- Sven Hannawald, ski jumper
- Jens Weißflog, ski jumper
- Wolfgang Uhle (1512–1594), known as the “Plague Minister” of Annaberg, was minister in Breitenbrunn from 1569 to 1594.
- Christian Gottlob Wild, minister and dialect poet, died here in 1839.
