= Große Mittweida =

River in Germany

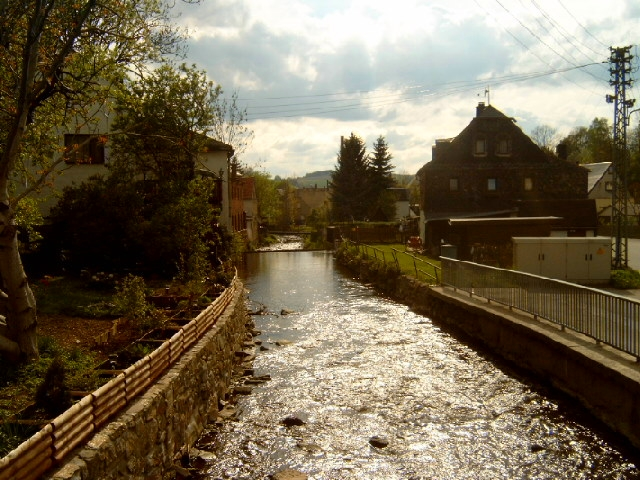

Location
- Country: Germany
- States: Saxony

Physical characteristics
- Mouth
  - location: Schwarzwasser
  - coordinates: 50.5460°N 12.7943°E

Basin features
- Progression: Schwarzwasser→ Zwickauer Mulde→ Mulde→ Elbe→ North Sea

The Große Mittweida (or just called as Mittweida) is a river of Saxony, Germany. It is a right tributary of the Schwarzwasser, which it joins in Schwarzenberg. Its source is on the north slope of the Fichtelberg.

== See also ==
- List of rivers of Saxony
