= Schwarzwasser (Mulde) =

River in Germany and Czechia

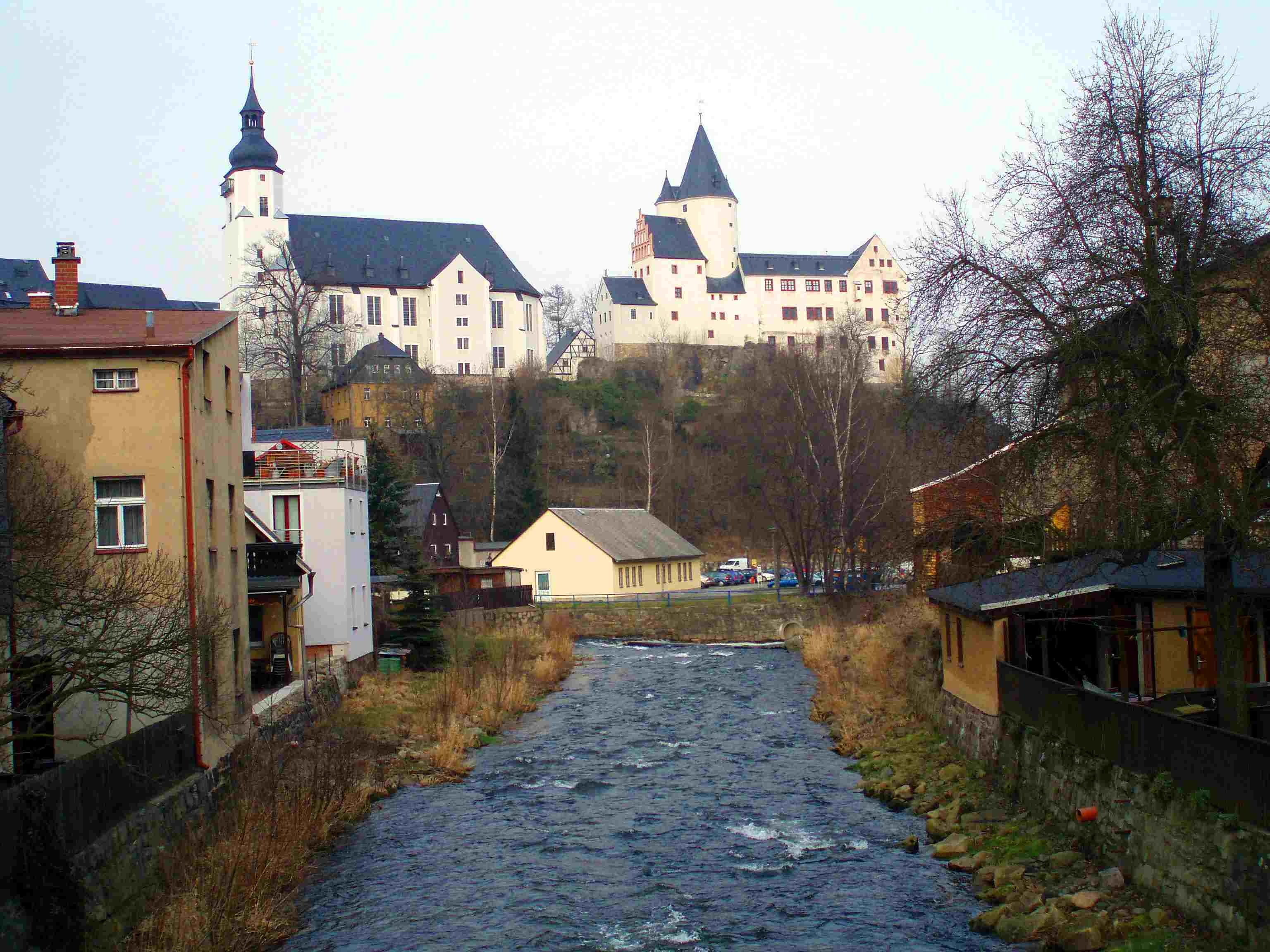
- The Schwarzwasser in Schwarzenberg

Location
- Countries: Germany; Czech Republic
- State (DE): Saxony
- Region (CZ): Karlovy Vary

Physical characteristics
- Source
  - location: on the Fichtelberg
  - coordinates: 50°25′08″N 12°56′16″E
  - elevation: ca. 1,117 m above sea level (NHN)
- Mouth
  - location: in Aue into the Zwickauer Mulde
  - coordinates: 50°35′19″N 12°42′07″E
  - elevation: 342.3 m above sea level (NHN)
- Discharge
  - location: at Aue 1 gauge
  - average: 6.28 m^{3}/s (222 cu ft/s)
  - maximum: Average high: 65.8 m^{3}/s (2,320 cu ft/s); Record high: 315 m^{3}/s (11,100 cu ft/s) (in 2002)

Basin features
- Progression: Zwickauer Mulde→ Mulde→ Elbe→ North Sea
- Tributaries
  - right: Große Mittweida
- Waterbodies: Reservoirs: Myslivny Reservoir

The Schwarzwasser (in German) or Černá (in Czech) is a river in Germany and the Czech Republic. The name means 'black'. It is a right tributary of the Zwickauer Mulde in the German state of Saxony. It flows through Schwarzenberg.

== Gallery ==
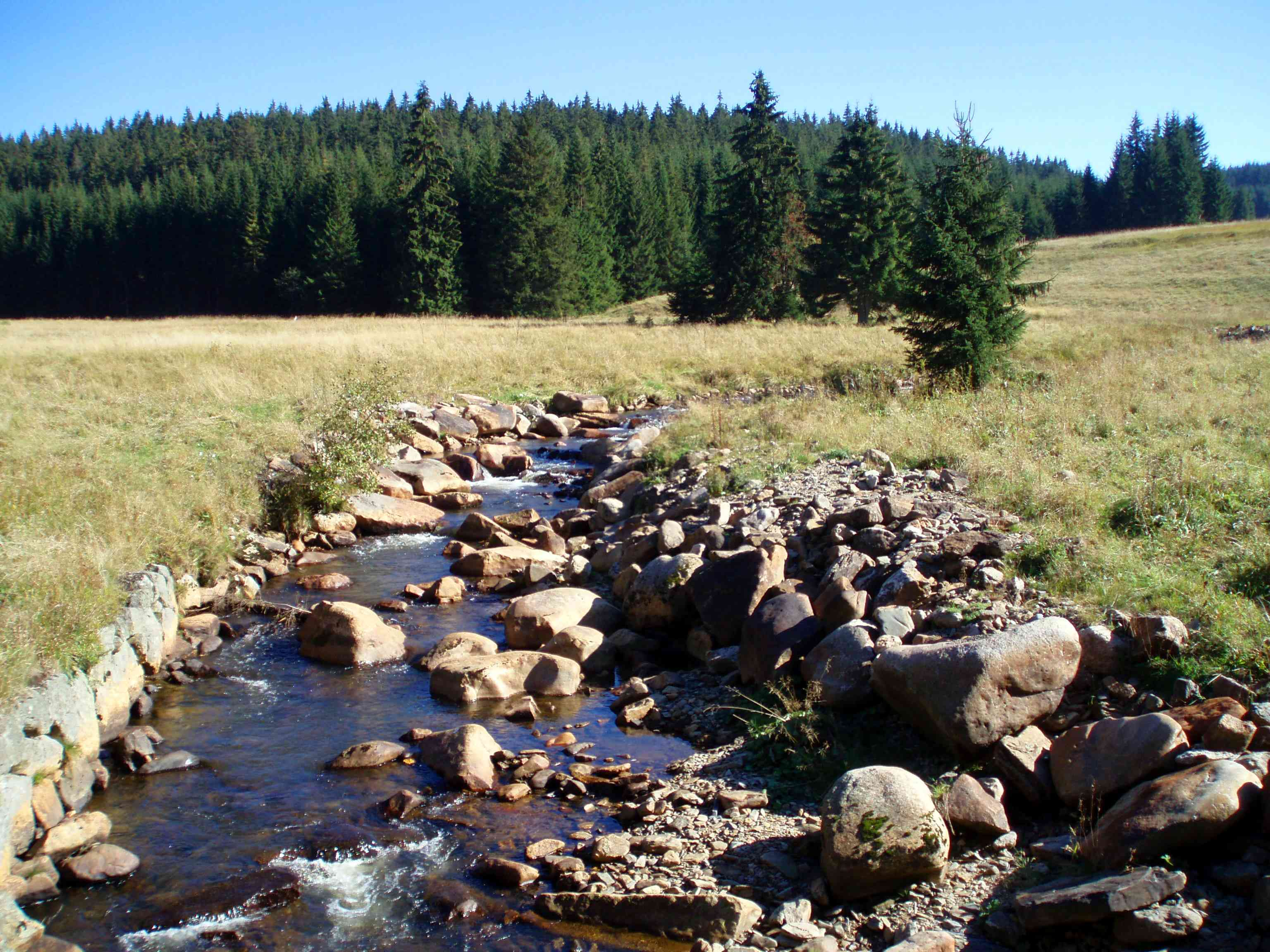
The Schwarzwasser near Luhy

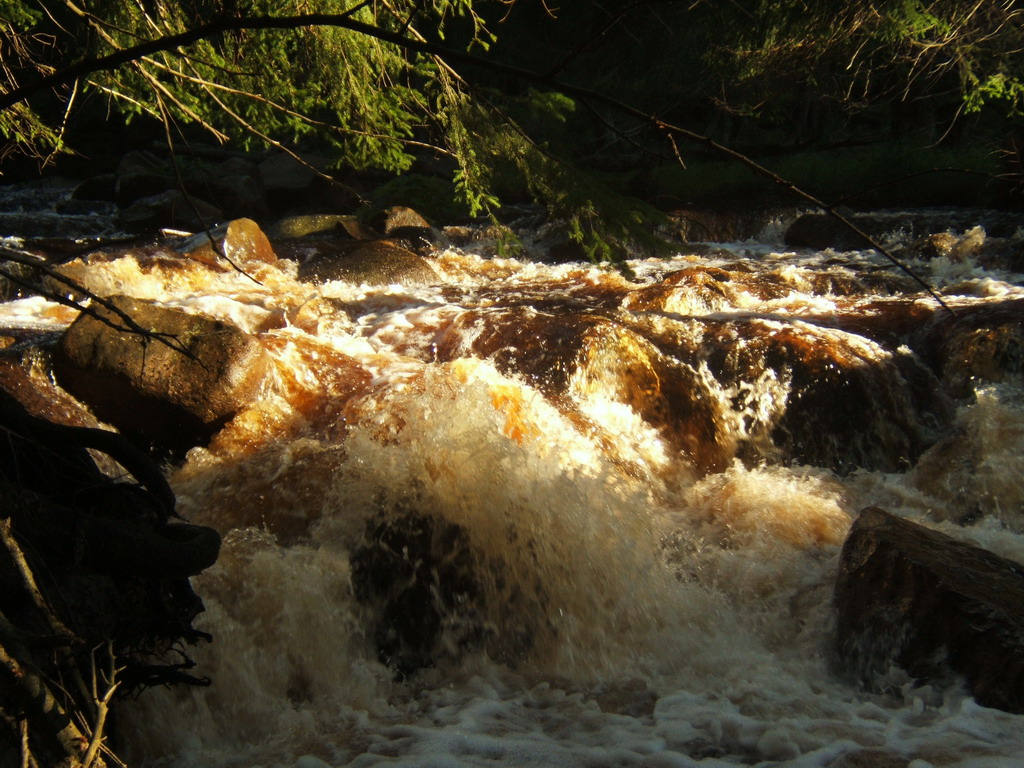
The Schwarzwasser above Potůčky

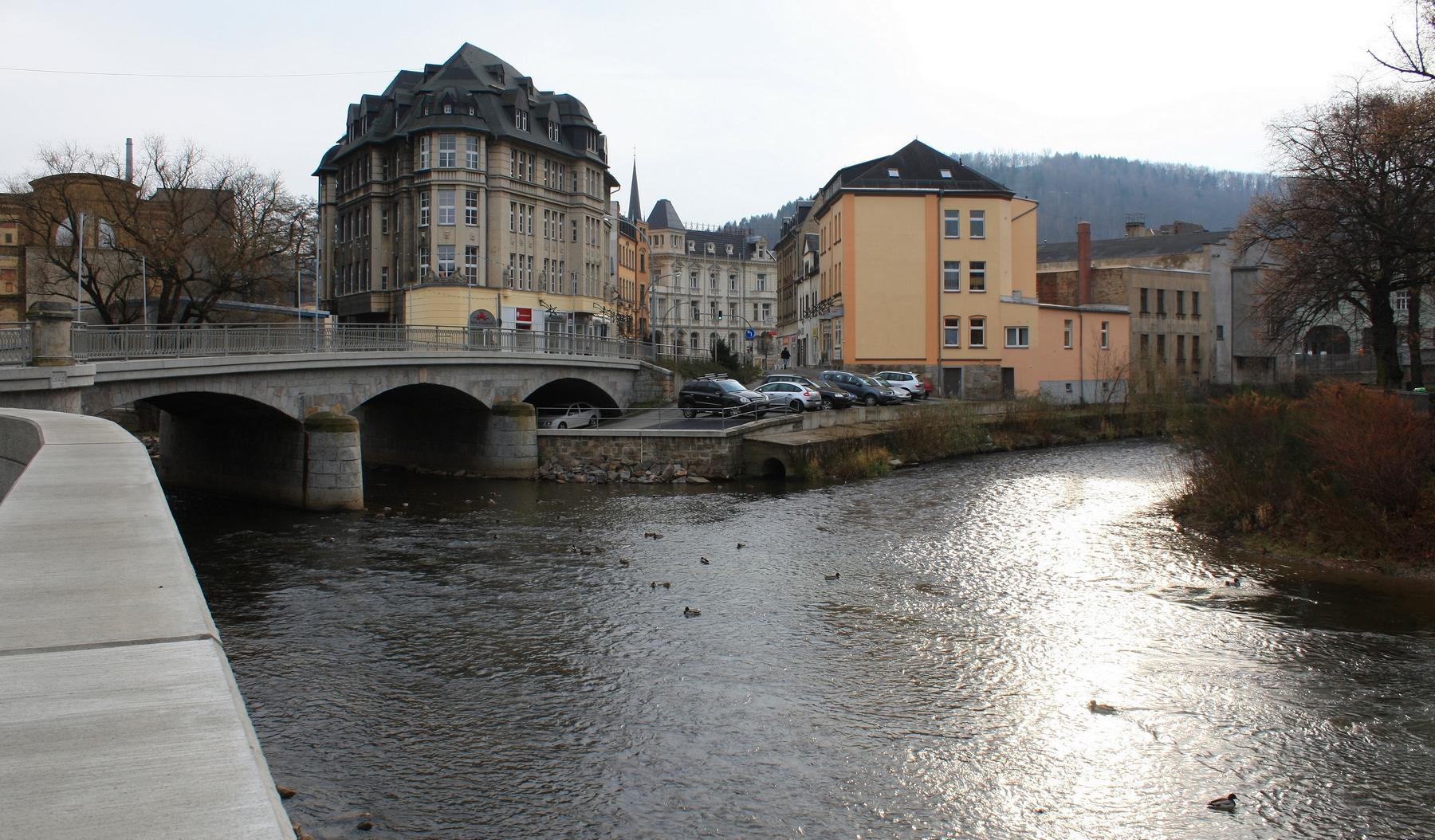
Aue: mouth of the Schwarzwasser (left) at the Mulde

== See also ==
- List of rivers of Saxony
- List of rivers of the Czech Republic
