= Schwarzenberg, Saxony =

Town in Saxony, Germany

Schwarzenberg
- Town
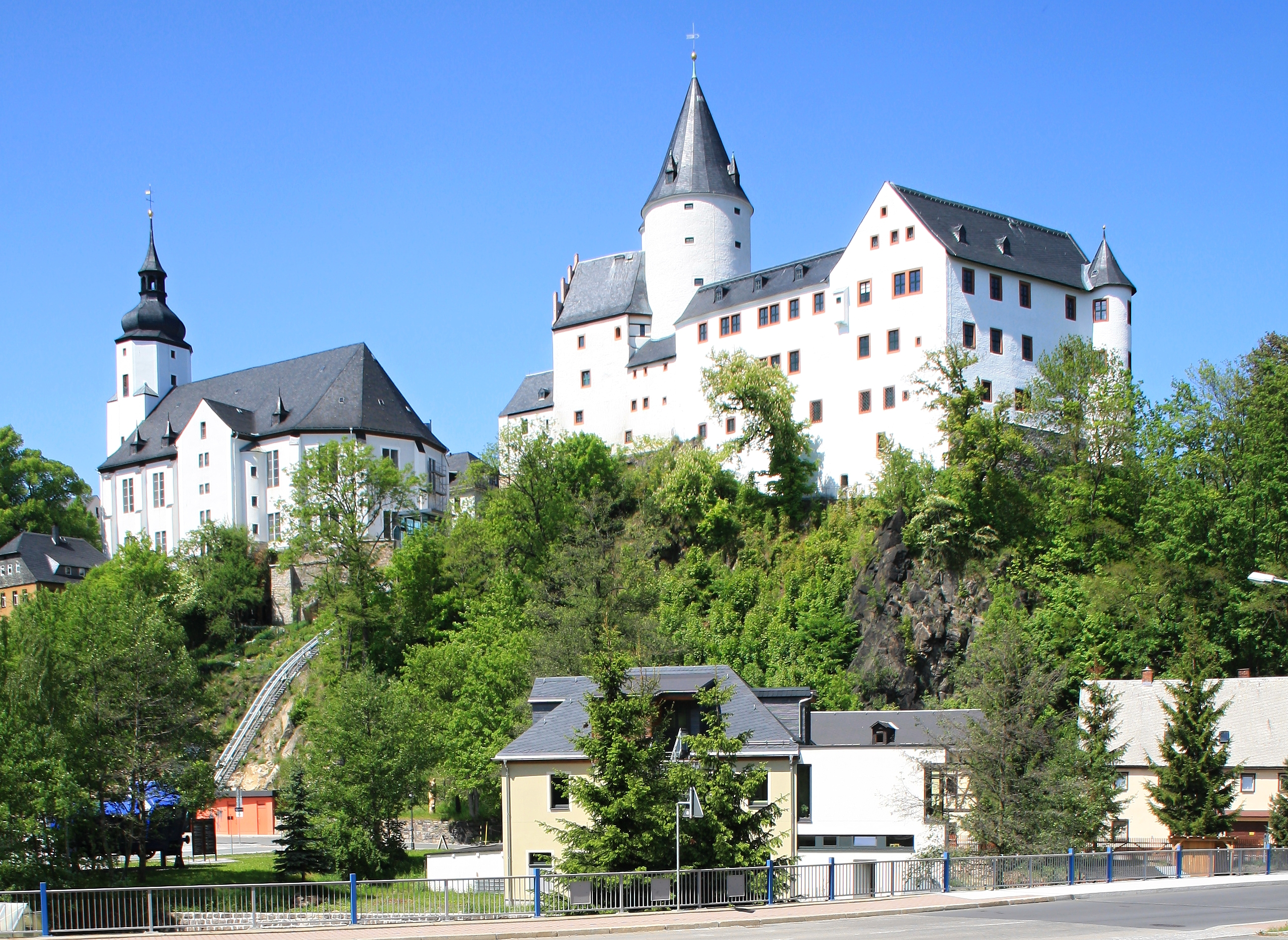

- Coat of arms

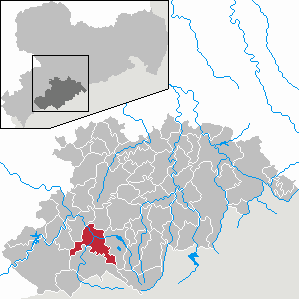
- Location of Schwarzenberg within Erzgebirgskreis district
- Interactive map of Schwarzenberg
- Location within Germany Location within Saxony
- Coordinates: 50°32′43″N 12°46′45″E
- Country: Germany
- State: Saxony
- District: Erzgebirgskreis
- Subdivisions: 6

Government
  - Mayor (2020–27): Ruben Gehart (CDU)

Area
  - Total: 46.31 km^{2} (17.88 sq mi)
- Elevation: 468 m (1,535 ft)

Population (2025-12-31)
  - Total: 15,158
  - Density: 327.3/km^{2} (847.7/sq mi)
- Time zone: UTC+01:00 (CET)
  - Summer (DST): UTC+02:00 (CEST)
- Postal codes: 08340
- Dialling codes: 03774
- Vehicle registration: ERZ, ANA, ASZ, AU, MAB, MEK, STL, SZB, ZP
- Website: www.schwarzenberg.de

Schwarzenberg (German pronunciation: [ˈʃvaʁtsn̩ˌbɛʁk]) is a town in the district of Erzgebirgskreis in Saxony’s Ore Mountains, near the German–Czech border. The town lies roughly 15 km southeast of Aue, and 35 km southwest of Chemnitz.

Founded in the 12th century to protect a trade road, the small mountain town became the centre of a territory known as Herrschaft Schwarzenberg and later Amt Schwarzenberg. During the division of Germany, Schwarzenberg was part of East Germany and became the greatest producer of washing machines in Eastern Europe. Schwarzenberg became more widely known in 1987, when Stefan Heym coined the term Free Republic of Schwarzenberg for a small gap between the Soviet and American occupation zones in May/June 1945.

== Geography ==
Schwarzenberg is in the southwestern Ore Mountains. It lies at elevations stretching from 428.5 to 823 metres (1,406 to 2,700 ft) above sea level. The Old Town with church and castle is located on a rock (the Schlossberg, 593 metres (1,946 ft)) around which a meander of the River Schwarzwasser has formed; the Mittweida flows into the Schwarzwasser inside the town. However, the town's overall situation is in a basin. The most prominent peaks surrounding it, in addition to the Schlossberg, are the Hirschstein (641 metres (2,103 ft)), the Hohe Hahn (674 metres (2,211 ft)), the Hohe Henne (728 metres (2,388 ft)), the Rockelmann (580 metres (1,900 ft)), the Galgenberg (557 metres (1,827 ft)) and the Raschau Knochen (551 metres (1,808 ft)).

=== Geology ===
The town's silhouette is marked by the opposing rocks Ottenstein and Totenstein, which like the Schlossberg consist of Augen gneiss. Other stones include quartz (only some of it pure as rock crystal), biotite, muscovite and feldspar. The Schwarzenberg mining area is pervaded by ore veins of complex origin. Skarn deposits contain magnetite, iron pyrite, arsenopyrite, chalcopyrite, sphalerite and galena. The ore deposits are up to 6 metres thick and permeated by silver and cobalt minerals as well as cassiterite.

=== Constituent communities ===
The Old Town with market square, castle and St.-Georgen-Kirche (main church) forms the town's historical core. The Vorstadt was originally a southward extension outside the (now vanished) town walls, originally formed around a mill. Late 19th century factories and workers' housing around the station became the Neustadt north of the Old Town, now housing the civic centre with town hall and employment centre. North-west and south-west of the Old Town, the Hofgarten and Heide low-rise residential areas were built in the 1960s and 1970s, respectively, using large-block construction (a precursor of plattenbau construction). The plattenbau residential area Sonnenleithe at the town's northern border was built in the 1980s.

Although the town has incorporated several nearby communities over recent years, its population numbers remained stable at approximately 20,000 inhabitants. Sachsenfeld, Neuwelt, and Wildenau/Brückenberg were already incorporated into Schwarzenberg between 1913 and 1920. Grünstädtel followed in 1996, Bermsgrün, the hamlet Jägerhaus, Crandorf and Erla in 1999, and Pöhla in 2008.

=== Neighbouring communities ===
The communities that border on the town are Grünhain-Beierfeld in the northeast, Raschau in the east, Breitenbrunn and Sosa in the south and Bockau and Lauter in the west.

=== Flora ===
Schwarzenberg is located in the midst of forested hills in the Erzgebirge/Vogtland Natural Park. The flat Galgenberg dome is mostly covered by coniferous forest. Thick copse of sycamore, aspen, mountain ash, hazel and wild cherry grows on the terraces at the forest edge. Sporadic beech and Weymouth pine can be found on the Ottenstein. The feverfew-like Tanacetum parthenifolium, known locally as Schwarzenberger Edelweiß, has found a curiously isolated habitat in Schwarzenberg and has resisted attempts at shifting or cultivation.

== History ==
=== Establishment and early history ===
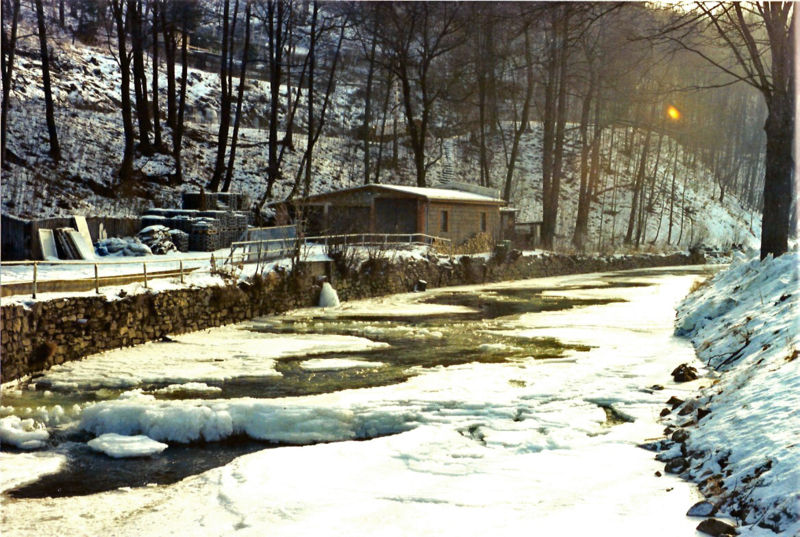
The Schwarzwasser is the most important river in Schwarzenberg.

Schwarzenberg was first documented in 1282 as “civitas Swartzenberg”, but potsherds excavated in 1977 date back somewhat further to c.1200 and the official year of establishment has been fixed at 1150. The town developed out of a fortification which is believed to have been created by Duke Heinrich II of Austria to protect an important trade route between Pleissnerland and Bohemia in the otherwise unsettled area.

Schwarzenberg is German for black mountain. According to legend, an emperor of the Ottonian dynasty founded the town and named it after the colour of the rock. It is generally believed that the town was in fact named after the appearance created by the thick, dark forest.

The town is said to have passed to Emperor Frederick I Barbarossa in 1170, and then to his son, Emperor Henry VI. Later, numerous changes of ownership occurred. In 1334 the house of Lobdeburg held Schwarzenberg and the surrounding area as a fief. The house of Tettau obtained the town in 1425, and sold it to Elector Elector John the Magnanimous of Saxony in 1533.

Villages began to form around Schwarzenberg Castle, and for c.1500, 48 families are documented in Schwarzenberg, which was then the seat of the superintendent of the mines in the area. During the reformation, the town became Protestant.

=== Townsite ===
Schwarzenberg's skyline is dominated by the ensemble of church and palace, the latter having been built on an old castle's foundation walls. This former castle can be considered one of the town's first fortified buildings. The St.-Georgen-Kirche (church) on the other hand is clearly newer, having been built only in the late 17th century. With the help of the oldest known drawing of Schwarzenberg, a pen and ink work by Wilhelm Dilich from the late 1620s, one can get an idea of the town's original appearance. At the end of today's Oberen Schloßstraße rises the palace (Schloss), which was once built as a castle, and which, over the course of its history, has been expanded and remodelled many times. Right on the marketplace, at the other end of the aforesaid street, is found the Town Hall. The third conspicuous building in the town's historic centre was the church, which became too small in the 17th century and was replaced by the St.-Georgen-Kirche. Beside the old church lay the graveyard on the site today known as the Unterer Markt (“Lower Market”). It was not long before it, too, became too small, and it was supplemented – and later wholly supplanted – by another graveyard outside the town's walls. Already in Dilich's drawing, nothing more is to be seen of the town's walls. All that remains of them now is the names Oberes Tor and Unteres Tor (“Upper Gate” and “Lower Gate”).

Once the buildings within the town could no longer handle the steadily growing population, houses were built outside the town's walls. In the aforesaid drawing, the first “suburban” buildings can already be seen beneath the church.

=== After the Second World War ===
After Germany's surrender in the Second World War, Schwarzenberg remained, for historically unclear reasons, unoccupied at first. The city issued 42 postage stamps in 1945, all showing a heavy black silhouetted outline of the city blotting out Hitler's face. On 11 May 1945, several antifascist Schwarzenberg citizens took the initiative of filling the resulting power vacuum. This episode lasted only until 25 June 1945 when Soviet troops marched in. In 1984, the writer Stefan Heym coined the term “Republic of Schwarzenberg” in his novel Schwarzenberg, which was based on the episode. A lively accumulation of legends is bound up with this time. In 2004, the writer Volker Braun also treated the topic.

=== Religion ===
- Evangelical Lutheran Parish of St. George
- Evangelical Methodist Parish
- Catholic Parish of the Holy Family
- Schwarzenberg Branch of the Church of Jesus Christ of Latter-day Saints

=== Population ===
Changes in population:

1834 to 1950

- 1834 - 2,015
- 1875 - 3,299
- 1880 - 3,462
- 1933 - 12,104
- 1946 - 12,117 1
- 1950 - 20,269 2

1960 to 1998

- 1960 - 14,877
- 1971 - 14,808
- 1981 - 17,191
- 1984 - 16,844
- 1995 - 19,251
- 1998 - 20,911

1999 to 2004

- 1999 - 20,549
- 2000 - 20,201
- 2001 - 19,775
- 2002 - 19,309
- 2003 - 18,914
- 2004 - 18,660

2005 to 2006

- 2005 - 18,406
- 2006 - 18,207

Notes.

Dated 31 December as of 1960, except (1) 29 October and (2) 31 August.
Source as of 1998 is Statistisches Landesamt Sachsen.

=== Mayor ===
The current mayor is Ruben Gehart (CDU), elected in October 2020.

=== Coat of arms ===
Schwarzenberg's arms show the dragon slayer Saint George, who according to legend is held to have taken on the lindworm at the Totenstein (“Dead Man’s Stone”), which was a lasting threat to the townsfolk. While fleeing from the figure, Saint George is said to have tried to leap across the river Schwarzwasser on his horse, landing on the Ottenstein on the other side. It is furthermore said that his horse's horseshoe print may still be seen in the river even today.

=== Town twins ===
Schwarzenberg is twinned with (Germany) Wunsiedel since 1990; (Czech Republic) Nové Sedlo since 2006; and (Germany) Borchen since 2007.

== Culture and sightseeing ==
Often called the "Pearl of the Erzgebirge", Schwarzenberg's main attraction is its historic centre.

- Palace with museum
- St.-Georgen-Kirche (built between 1690 and 1699)
- The Grenzlandfeierstätte (“Borderland Celebration Place”), dedicated in 1938, affords roughly 15,000 visitors seats for great cultural events as a Waldbühne (“forest stage”).
- Weiße Frau (“White Woman”) on Jägerhäuser Straße
- "Brunnenanlage und Meißner Glockenspiel" ("Faountain and the Meissen porcelain glockenspiel"), with 37 bells, is situated in the heritage-protected old town

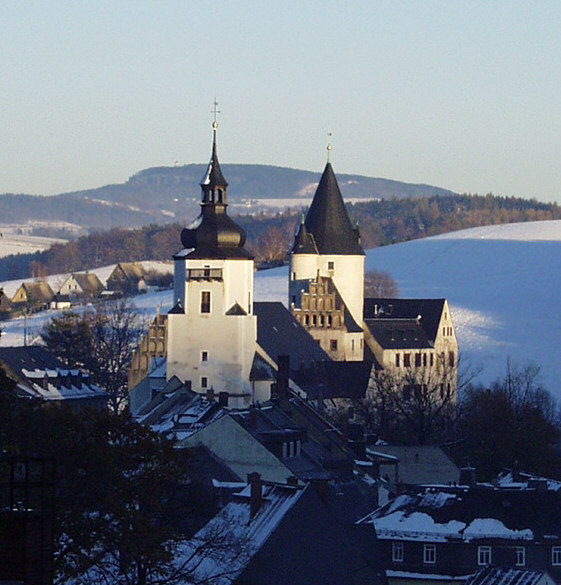
St.-Georgen-Kirche and Palace

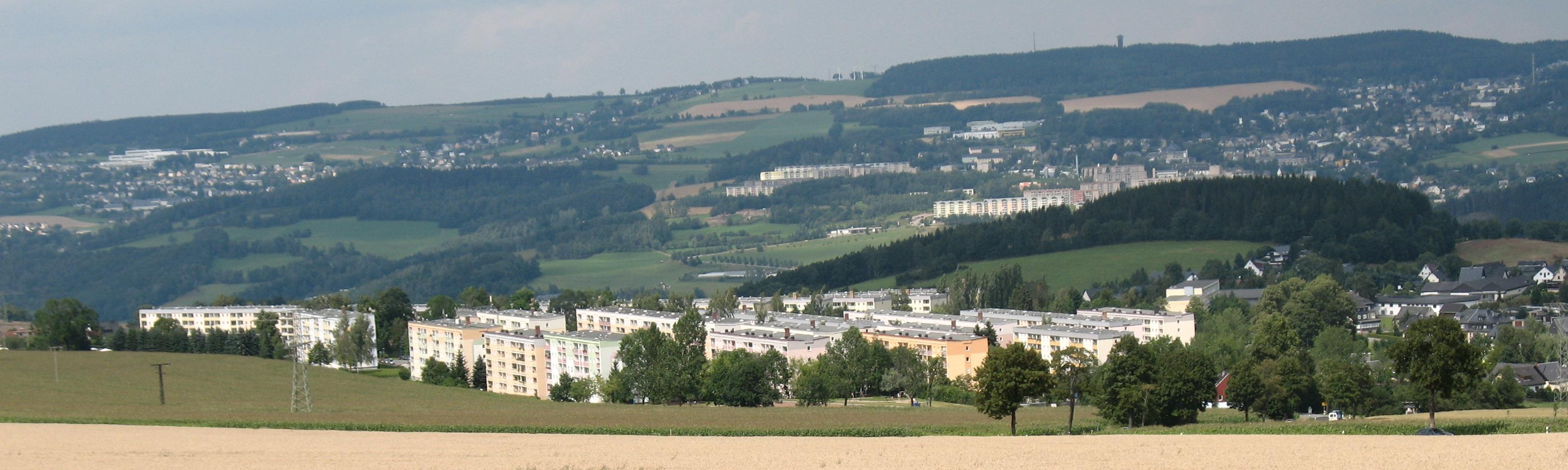
View from the road to Jägerhaus: In the foreground the residential area of Heide, behind it in the middle of the picture the residential area of Sonnenleithe, on the right edge of the picture Beierfeld, on the left edge of the picture Bernsbach, on the horizon to the right, the Spiegelwald

=== Museums ===
- Schloss Schwarzenberg - PERLA CASTRUM Museum - A Castle Full of History
- Eisenbahnmuseum (railway museum)

=== Clubs ===
- FSV Blau-Weiss Schwarzenberg 1921 e.V.
- Modelleisenbahn-Club Schwarzenberg e.V. (model railways)
- Erzgebirgszweigverein Schwarzenberg

=== Regular events ===
- Fest alter Musik im Erzgebirge (“old music in the Ore Mountains”, since 1994)
- Schwarzenberger Ostermarkt (Easter market)
- Schwarzenberger Altstadt- und Edelweißfest (“Old Town and Edelweiss festival”, since 1993)
- Schwarzenberger Weihnachtsmarkt (Christmas Market, since 1534)

== Economy and infrastructure ==
From being a small industrial centre in East Germany, and home to two large companies, Foron and Formenbau Schwarzenberg, Schwarzenberg has lost most of its heavy industry over the last two decades. Only the latter company has stayed in business, and that as a subsidiary of the KUKA Corporation of Augsburg. Tourism is now the main industry, with the town being an excellent base for hiking tours during summer.

Through the town runs the Silver Road.

The town has a station at the junction of the Zwickau to Schwarzenberg, Schwarzenberg to Johanngeorgenstadt and Annaberg to Schwarzenberg railway lines, and is served by Regionalbahn trains, operated by Erzgebirgsbahn (a subsidiary of Deutsche Bahn) between Zwickau and Johanngeorgenstadt. No regular passenger trains operate to Annaberg.

=== Education ===
Schwarzenberg has at its disposal four elementary schools (Neuwelt, Sonnenleithe, Heide and Crandorf) a middle school (“Stadtschule”), a Gymnasium (“Bertolt-Brecht-Gymnasium”) and a vocational school centre for economy and social welfare. There are also a school for students with learning difficulties, a special school for the mentally handicapped and a folk high school.

== Famous people ==
=== Honorary citizens ===
- Hans Brockhage (1925–2009), designer and sculptor
- Harry Schmidt (1927–2003), woodcarver

=== Sons and daughters of the town ===
- Gottfried Heinrich Stölzel (1690-1749), composer
- Arthur Vogel (1868–1962), merchant, photographer and publisher of Ore Mountain picture postcards
- Elisabeth Rethberg (1894–1976), singer
- Friedrich Emil Krauß (1895–1977), industrialist, bathtub and washing machine maker
- Kurt Weisflog (1906–1942), Member of the Reichstag
- Hans Brockhage (1925–2009), designer and sculptor
- Axel Köhler (b. 1960), countertenor and film director
- Hans-Christoph Rademann (b. 1965), choral conductor

=== Celebrities who have worked in town ===
- Louis Krauß (1862–1927), born in what is now the constituent community of Neuwelt, industrialist, bathtub maker
- Dr. iur. Ludwig Günther Martini (1647–1719), between 1672 and 1677 a jurist in Schwarzenberg, writer and later court official in Wernigerode.
- Ernst Schneller (1890–1944), from 1919 a teacher in the town, latter KPD Member of the Reichstag. His workplace, today's Stadtschule Schwarzenberg, bore his name for more than 40 years
- Walter Hesse (1846–1911), county physician, unveiled Schneeberger Bergkrankheit as lung cancer, later fellow worker of Robert Koch
- Ricco Groß (b. 1970), many times world champion and Olympic medallist in biathlon, grew up here.
- Markus Beyer (b. 1971), boxer and former world champion in super middleweight, grew up here.

== See also ==
- Raschauer Knochen
