= KEKA-FM =

- Eureka, California; United States
- Frequency: 101.5 MHz
- Branding: 101 Thunder Country

Programming
- Format: Classic country
- Affiliations: Fox News Radio; Westwood One

Ownership
- Owner: Eureka Broadcasting Co., Inc.
- Sister stations: KEJY, KINS-FM, KWSW

History
- First air date: 1983
- Call sign meaning: Eureka

Technical information
- Licensing authority: FCC
- Facility ID: 19839
- Class: C
- ERP: 89,000 watts
- HAAT: 625 meters (2,051 ft)
- Transmitter coordinates: 40°25′12″N 124°5′0″W
- Translator: 100.9 K265BT (Arcata)

Links
- Public license information: Public file; LMS
- Webcast: Listen live
- Website: keka101.com

KEKA-FM (101.5 FM) is a radio station broadcasting a classic country format. Licensed to Eureka, California, United States, it serves the Eureka area. The station is currently owned by Eureka Broadcasting Co., Inc. and features programming from Fox News Radio and Westwood One.
