= KWSW =

Radio station in Eureka, California

- Eureka, California; United States
- Broadcast area: Eureka, California
- Frequency: 980 kHz
- Branding: EZ Radio

Programming
- Format: Adult contemporary
- Affiliations: Golden State Warriors; Las Vegas Raiders

Ownership
- Owner: Eureka Broadcasting, Inc.
- Sister stations: KEJY, KEKA-FM, KINS-FM

History
- First air date: January 26, 1947
- Former call signs: KHUM (1947–1958); KINS (1958–2011); KWSW (2011–2015); KEJY (2015)
- Former frequencies: 1240 kHz (1947–1956)

Technical information
- Licensing authority: FCC
- Facility ID: 19841
- Class: B
- Power: 5,000 watts (day); 500 watts (night)
- Transmitter coordinates: 40°48′1.5″N 124°07′43.2″W
- Translator: 95.5 K238CJ (Eureka)

Links
- Public license information: Public file; LMS
- Webcast: Listen live
- Website: https://kwsw980.com

KWSW (980 AM) is a radio station licensed to Eureka, California, United States. The station airs an adult contemporary format (with a few adult standards formatted songs being added) and serves the Eureka area. The station is currently owned by Eureka Broadcasting, Inc.

== History ==
The station began broadcasting on January 26, 1947, and held the call sign KHUM. It originally broadcast at 1240 kHz. In 1956, KHUM's frequency was changed to 980 kHz.

Its call sign was changed to KINS in 1958. The station aired a middle of the road (MOR) format in the 1970s, and a news-talk format in the 1990s and 2000s. In 2011, the station's call sign was changed to KWSW. The station continued to air a news-talk format. On June 9, 2015, the station's call sign was changed to KEJY, but it was changed back to KWSW on August 13, 2015. It adopted a soft AC format branded "EZ Radio" on July 1, 2017.
