= 2010 Eureka earthquake =

January 2010 earthquake in California

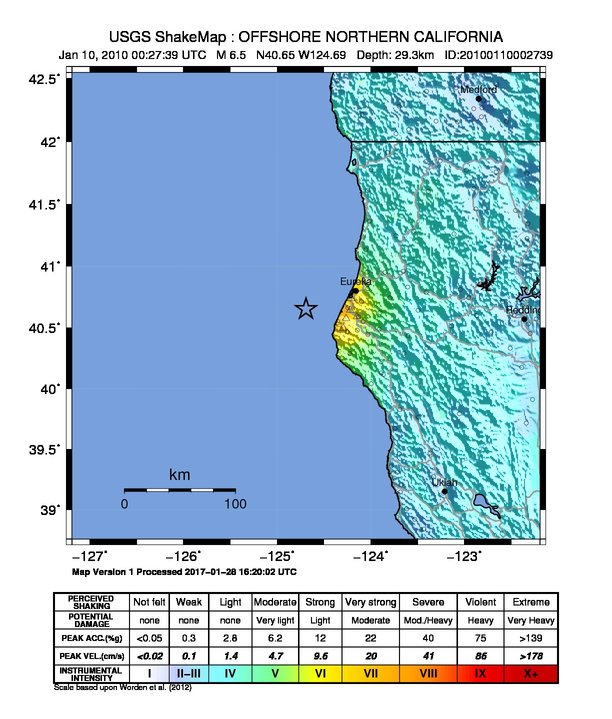

- UTC time: 2010-01-10 00:27:41
- ISC event: 14223208
- USGS-ANSS: ComCat
- Local date: January 9, 2010
- Local time: 16:27:38 PST
- Duration: ~10 seconds at King Salmon, California
- Magnitude: 6.5 M_{w}
- Depth: 13.5 miles (21.7 km)
- Epicenter: 40.65°N 124.76°W
- Type: Strike-slip
- Areas affected: North Coast (California), United States
- Total damage: $21.8–43 million
- Max. intensity: MMI VII (Very strong)
- Aftershocks: ~24
- Casualties: 35 injuries

The 2010 Eureka earthquake occurred on January 9 at 4:27:38 pm PST offshore of Humboldt County, California, United States. The magnitude was measured 6.5 on the M_{w} scale, and its epicenter was located offshore in the Pacific Ocean 33 miles (53 km) west of the nearest major city, Eureka, California. Additionally, there was a separate earthquake further offshore of Eureka on February 4 with a slightly lower magnitude of 5.9. It was also the most significant earthquake in the Eureka area in terms of magnitude since the 1992 Cape Mendocino earthquakes. It was felt from Santa Cruz County, California in the south, to Eugene, Oregon in the north and to the east as far as Reno, Nevada.

== Tectonic setting ==
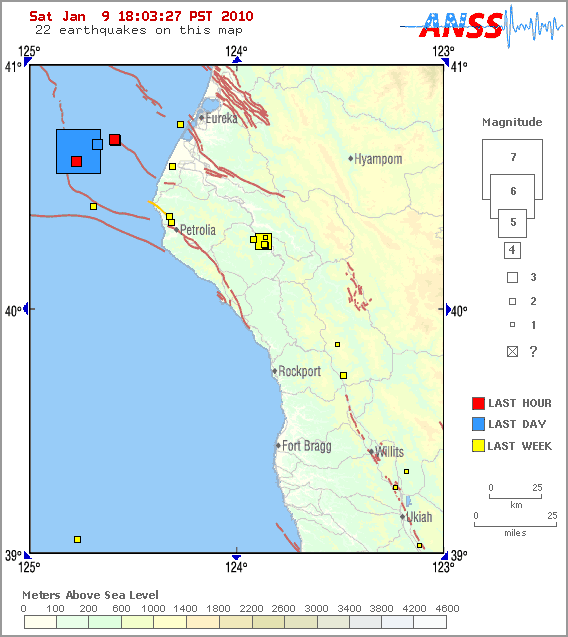
Earthquake map showing epicenter and magnitude (in blue color) of 2010 Eureka earthquake.

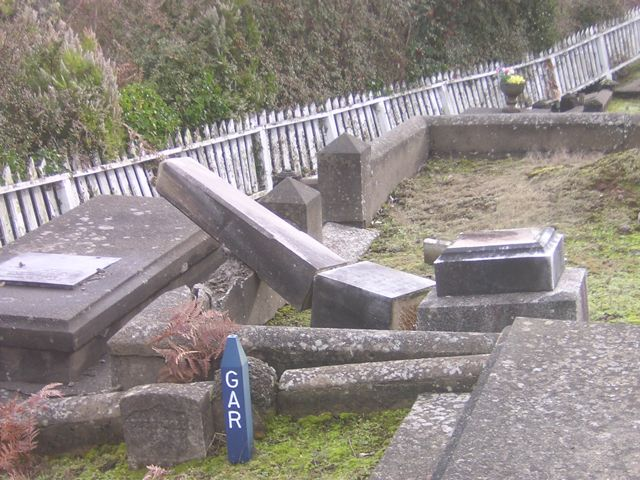
2010 Eureka earthquake damage to the historical cemetery at Ferndale, California. Obelisks, monuments and retaining walls were damaged.

Near Cape Mendocino, the Mendocino triple junction is an area of active seismicity where three tectonic plates come together. The Mendocino fracture zone (also known as the Mendocino Fault east of the Gorda Ridge) is a transform fault that separates the Pacific and Gorda plates. To the south, the relative motion between the Pacific plate and North American plate is accommodated by the San Andreas Fault, and to the north, the Gorda plate is converging with the North American plate at the Cascadia subduction zone.

== Impact ==
Structural damage was inflicted among older Victorian houses, power was severed for several hours, and windows were shattered. In addition, 28,000 customers of Pacific Gas and Electric Company, mostly those from Humboldt County, were temporarily left without electricity and phone services as a result.

In Eureka, the Old Town Bar and Grill building was previously believed to be severely damaged beyond repair and ordered demolished by the city, until a developer purchased and renovated it in 2011. The town's high school, known as Eureka High School, and the Bayshore Mall were damaged and briefly closed, though both were later reopened with close to full services. An auditorium at Eureka High remained closed over concerns regarding its structural safety as of June 15, 2010. A total of 463 buildings sustained damage as a result of the earthquake, leaving $21.8–43 million in losses.

== See also ==
- List of earthquakes in 2010
- List of earthquakes in the United States
- List of earthquakes in California
- 2022 Ferndale earthquake
