= Palco (disambiguation) =

Palco is a city in Kansas, United States.

Palco may also refer to:

- Pacific Lumber Company (PALCO), forest products company in Scotia, California, U.S.
- Eureka Marsh (previously known as Palco Marsh), adjacent to Humboldt Bay, California, U.S.

== See also ==
- San Pedro de Palco District, Peru
