= KEJB (AM) =

Radio station in Eureka, California

- Eureka, California; United States
- Frequency: 1480 kHz
- Branding: The Jukebox

Programming
- Format: Oldies

Ownership
- Owner: Bicoastal Media; (Bicoastal Media Licenses II, LLC)
- Sister stations: KATA, KFMI, KKHB, KRED

History
- First air date: May 12, 1933 (as KIEM at 1210)
- Former call signs: KIEM (1933–1961); KRED (1961–1994); KTMA (1994–1996); KGOE (1996–2023)
- Former frequencies: 1210 kHz (1933–1935); 1450 kHz (1935–1941)
- Call sign meaning: "Eureka Jukebox"

Technical information
- Licensing authority: FCC
- Facility ID: 35529
- Class: B
- Power: 5,000 watts day; 1,000 watts night
- Transmitter coordinates: 40°44′27.5″N 124°12′9.2″W
- Translator: 92.7 K224ER (Eureka)

Links
- Public license information: Public file; LMS
- Webcast: Listen live
- Website: jukeboxeureka.com

KEJB (1480 AM) is a radio station broadcasting an oldies format. Licensed to Eureka, California, United States, it serves the Eureka area. The station is owned by Bicoastal Media, though licensee Bicoastal Media Licenses II, LLC.

== History ==
The station is the North Coast's oldest continuously operating radio station. It signed on in 1933 as KIEM. It gradually spawned the area's first television station, KIEM-TV. The radio side changed its call sign to KRED in 1961, but remained a sister station to KIEM-TV until the two stations were sold to separate owners in the 1970s.

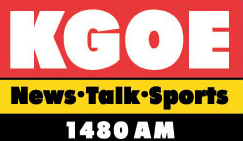
Logo as KGOE

The station's call sign from 1996 to 2023, KGOE, came from a former simulcast of KGO (810 AM), a talk radio station in San Francisco.

On February 1, 2023, KGOE changed its format from progressive talk to oldies, branded as "The Jukebox" under new KEJB call letters.
