= KECA =

KECA refers to the following broadcasting stations in the United States:

- KABC (AM), a radio station on 790 kHz licensed to Los Angeles, California, United States, which held the call sign KECA from 1929 to 1954
- KLOS, an FM radio station on 95.5 MHz licensed to Los Angeles, California, United States, which held the call sign KECA-FM from 1947 to 1954
- KABC-TV, a television station on channel 7 licensed to Los Angeles, California, United States, which held the call sign KECA-TV from 1949 to 1954
- KWLF, an FM radio station on 98.1 MHz licensed to Fairbanks, Alaska, United States, which held the call sign KECA from 1985 to 1986
- KKHB, an FM radio station on 105.5 MHz licensed to Eureka, California, United States, which held the call sign KECA from 1988 to 1993
- KECA-LD, a low-power television station on channel 29 licensed to Eureka, California, United States
