= KEJY =

Radio station in Eureka, California

- Eureka, California; United States
- Frequency: 790 kHz
- Branding: Destination Radio

Programming
- Format: Travelers information

Ownership
- Owner: Eureka Broadcasting Co., Inc.

History
- First air date: 1980 (as KEKA)
- Former call signs: KEKA (1979–1986); KFLI (1986–1993); KWSW (1993–2011); KEJY (2011–2015); KWSW (2015)

Technical information
- Licensing authority: FCC
- Facility ID: 19840
- Class: D
- Power: 500 watts (day); 340 watts (night)
- Transmitter coordinates: 40°48′02″N 124°07′43″W
- Translator: (106.9 MHz) K295CU (Scotia)

Links
- Public license information: Public file; LMS
- Webcast: Listen Live
- Website: Destination Radio Online

KEJY (790 AM) is a radio station located in Eureka, California. It is a travelers information station.

Until the early 2000s, KEJY was an adult standards station as part of the Westwood One radio network. Despite its current status as a traveller’s information station, KEJY is still listed in the Humboldt County telephone directory and in some online radio directories as a standards station.

On September 26, 2016, KEJY changed their format from Spanish adult hits to travelers information, branded as "Destination Radio".

On June 1, 2017, KEJY filed an application for a Federal Communications Commission construction permit to change frequency to 760 kHz, move to the KWSW transmitter site, decrease day power to 4,600 watts and increase night power to 310 watts. The application was accepted for filing on June 5, 2017.
