= KFMI =

Coordinates: 40.727°N 123.973°W

- Eureka, California; United States
- Broadcast area: Eureka, California
- Frequency: 96.3 MHz
- Branding: Power 96.3

Programming
- Format: Contemporary hit radio
- Affiliations: United Stations Radio Networks

Ownership
- Owner: Bicoastal Media Licenses II, LLC
- Sister stations: KATA, KEJB, KKHB, KRED

History
- First air date: 1973; 53 years ago

Technical information
- Licensing authority: FCC
- Facility ID: 41243
- Class: C
- ERP: 30,000 watts
- HAAT: 489 meters

Links
- Public license information: Public file; LMS
- Webcast: Listen Live
- Website: power963.com

KFMI (96.3 FM) is a commercial radio station in Eureka, California. KFMI airs a Top 40 radio format.
