= Streetcars in Eureka, California =

Eureka, California supported a series of street railways in the late 1800s and early 1900s. The history of the city's streetcars can be largely separated into a few eras distinguished by ownership: a horsecar company built the first lines, after a pause electrified service ran operated via a new company, then the system was under municipal ownership until abandonment. The street railway network extended to 13 miles (21 km) of track at its height.

== Horsecars ==
=== Eureka Street Railroad Company ===
The first horsecar line in Eureka opened in as the Eureka Street Railroad Company. A trial run of the first line down 2nd, E, and 5th streets took place on August 20, 1888 and regular service began within the following week. The company continued to build lines through the city, but ceased operations in 1897 after failing to turn a profit.

== Electric traction ==
=== Humboldt Transit Company ===
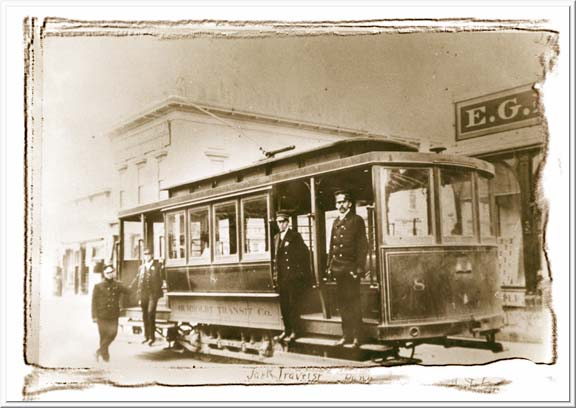
A Humboldt Transit Company streetcar in downtown Eureka

Electric streetcar service began on September 15, 1903. The California Street and E Street lines were soon extended south to Harris Street.

A planned line to Arcata never materialized. Operations failed to cover expenses as early as 1915, and the company was eventually sold to the city of Eureka at the end of 1921.

=== Eureka Municipal Railway ===
Municipal service was initially profitable, with 1,510,783 passengers served in 1923. By the late 1930s, automobile ownership had grown to greatly reduce demand for the streetcars. A special election in Eureka in November 1939 ended in favor of halting streetcar service, and operations ceased after February 20, 1940. A decommissioned car (No. 18) was ceremonially set on fire four days later, marking the end of the tram era in the city. Local bus services began under Eureka City Lines on February 23.
