= Sequoia Park Zoo =

Zoo in Eureka, California, United States

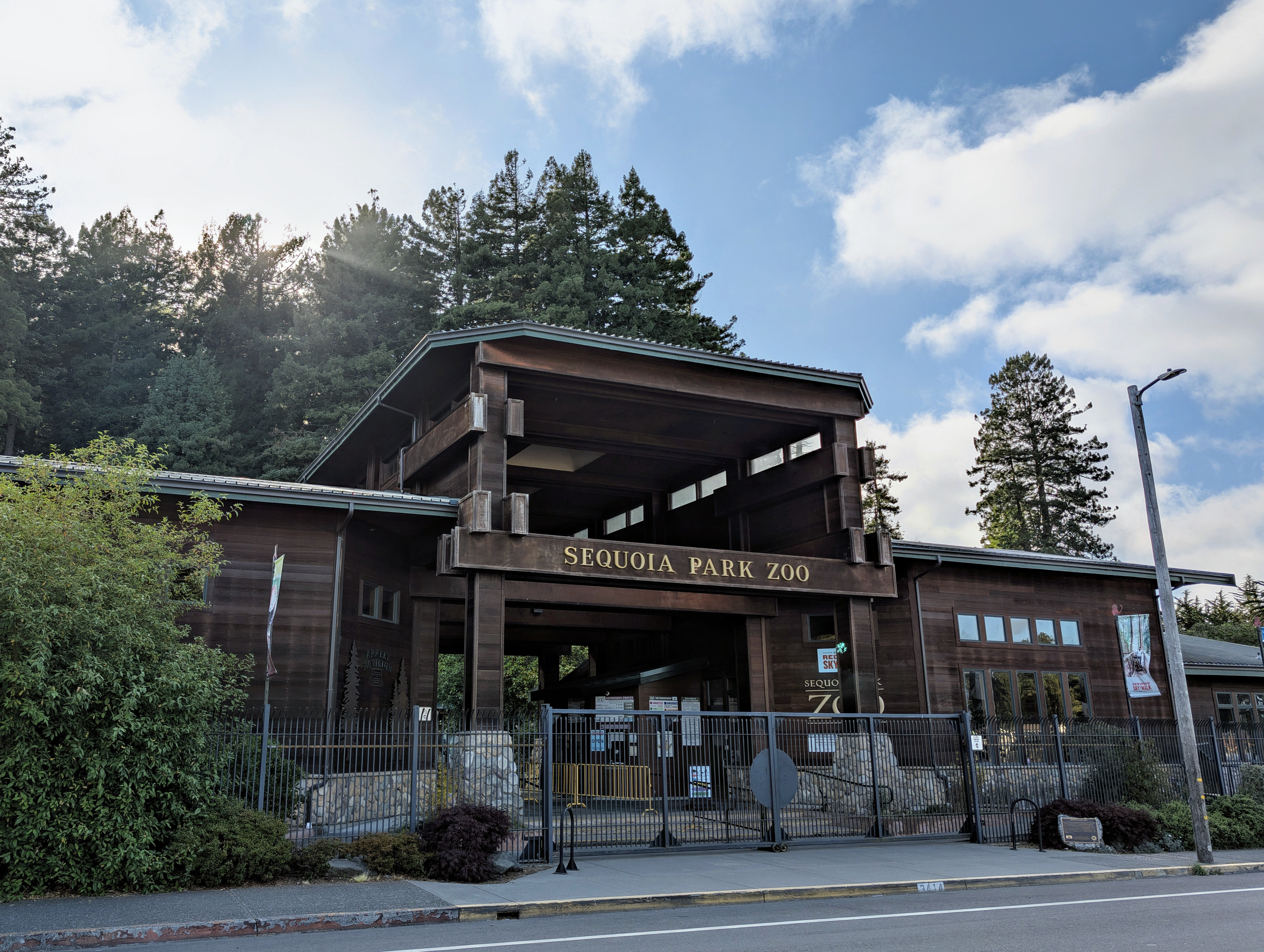
- Sequoia Park Zoo entrance
- Interactive map of Sequoia Park Zoo
- 40.77698°N 124.14496°W
- Date opened: 1907
- Location: Eureka, California, United States
- Land area: 5 acres (2.0 ha)
- No. of animals: Vertebrates: 195 (in 2013); Invertebrates: ~1,700 (in 2013)
- No. of species: 54 (in 2013)
- Memberships: AZA
- Website: www.redwoodzoo.org

The Sequoia Park Zoo is a zoo located in Eureka, California, operated by the City of Eureka. The zoo is part of a larger park complex including 60-acre (24 ha) of mature second-growth coast redwood forest, Eureka's largest public playground, and a duck pond, in addition to formal and natural gardens. The gardens include many varieties of rhododendron. The zoo's mission is "to inspire wonder, understanding and respect for the natural world by providing fun, rewarding, educational experiences that encourage meaningful connections between animals, humans, and our environment".

The zoo is open to the public daily, except in winter when it is closed on Mondays. The zoo houses about 200 vertebrates and hundreds of invertebrates, representing about 54 different species on 7-acre (2.8 ha). Completed in 2021, the zoo unveiled the Redwood Sky Walk, the longest sky walk in the western United States at just under a quarter of a mile. The sky walk is ADA accessible, and allows visitors to walk over 100 feet above the forest floor.

== History ==
Sequoia Park Zoo was founded in 1907, making it the oldest zoo in California. The zoo is located on the land of the native tribe of the Wiyot people, who are a federally recognized tribe in California with over 600 members. The city of Eureka, where the zoo is located, is a city on Humboldt Bay, where the Wiyot tribe has lived for thousands of years. Since 1907, the zoo has housed an array of animals including large hoof-stock, exotic birds, and small mammals.

The zoo achieved accreditation from the Association of Zoos and Aquariums (AZA) in 1995. Since accreditation the zoo has prioritized conservation, including Species Survival Plan breeding programs and education programs. After 100 years of free entry, the zoo started charging admission in the summer of 2008. The zoo is partially supported by a foundation which operates a gift shop, café and zoo facility for rentals in addition to fundraising and community outreach.

In October 2025 the zoo appeared in several prominent newspapers when they covered a story shared by the zoo on Facebook of a curious, wild black bear that sneaked in and "politely" observed its three captive black bears before being coaxed out.

== Collection ==
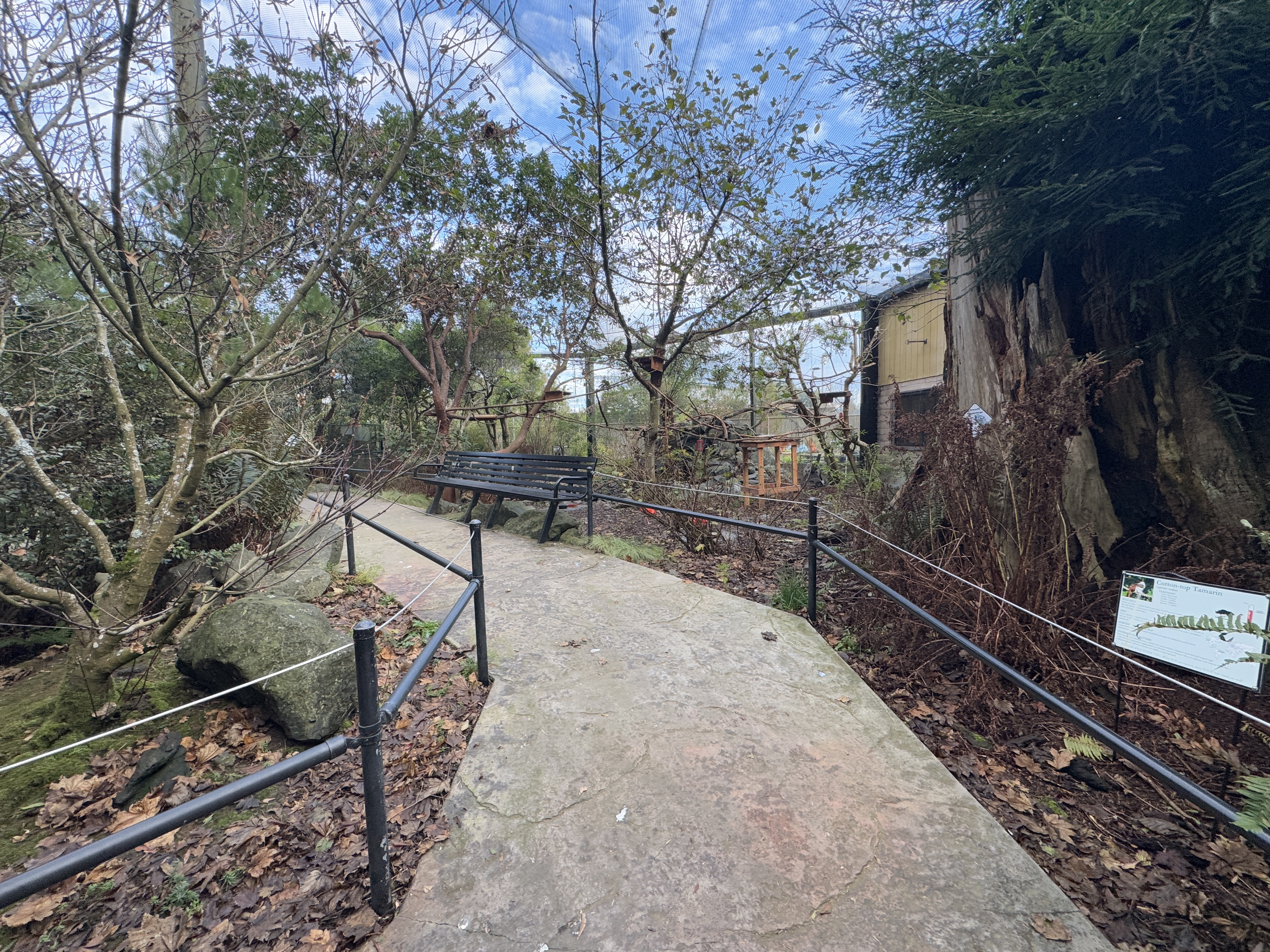
A walkway in the aviary.

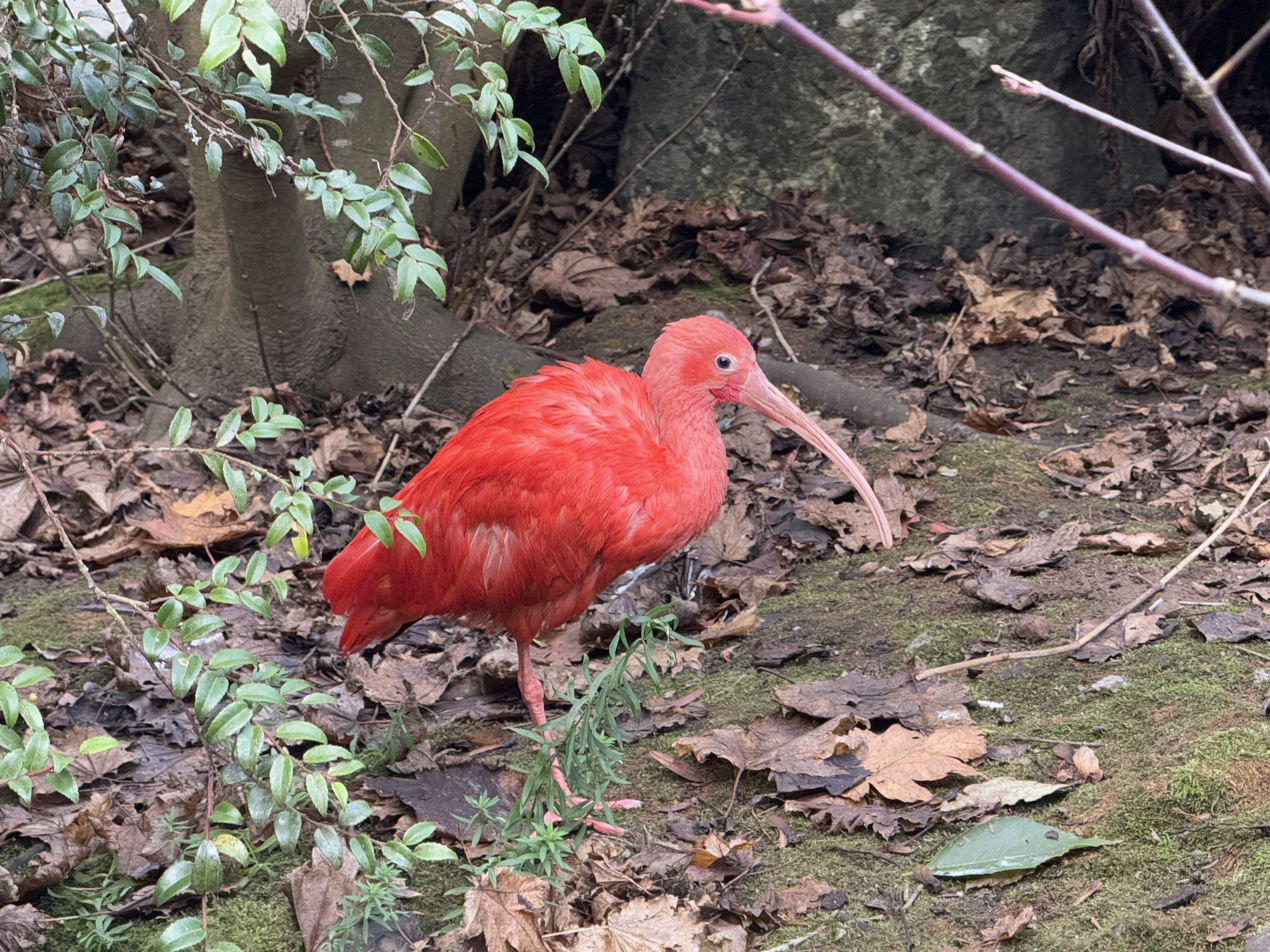
A scarlet ibis in the aviary.

The zoo exhibits brown-headed spider monkeys, black-headed spider monkeys, and white-handed gibbons. Joh-leen the white-handed gibbon died in 2019 of old age. Her partner Bono was moved to the Santa Barbara Zoo in February 2020 where he was partnered with a female widow. The zoo used to exhibit chimpanzees, one of which lived for fifty years at the zoo, dying at age 62.

The zoo's "Barnyard" is an educational exhibit that teaches about where food comes from and interact with domesticated animals including: goats, sheep, chickens, red jungle-fowl, rabbits, llamas, alpaca, donkeys, and a cat. Non-interactive exhibits include mice, skunk, opossum, a beehive and spiders. Birds in the walk-in free-flight aviary include scarlet ibis, spotted whistling ducks, band-tailed pigeons, green heron, Guira cuckoos, Nicobar pigeons, grey parrots, California quails, and Golden pheasants.

Sequoia Park Zoo's educational building is named "Secrets of the Forest", which features the animals and organisms in the redwood forest. A number of insects, reptiles and amphibians species exhibited in the Secrets of the Forest building.

More exotic animals include crested screamers, Patagonian maras (cavies), Orinoco geese, flamingos, bush dogs, red pandas, Indian muntjac, yaks, Chacoan peccaries, and rheas.

The "Watershed Heroes" habitat focuses on animals that live in and around the rivers in the Pacific Northwest, including river otters, salmon, bald eagles, ravens, and the endangered Northern spotted owl. The Sequoia Park Zoo has received top honors from the Association of Zoos and Aquariums (AZA) 2016 award for Exhibit Design (within zoos operating with a budget under $5 million) for the Watershed Heroes habitat.

With funding from the Bear River Band of the Rohnerville Rancheria, the "Bear & Coyote" habitat currently houses three black bears named Tule, Ishŭng, and Nabu. Bear River chose the names Ishŭng (meaning "she likes to eat") and Kunabulilh (meaning "he bites," nicknamed Nabu).

== Criticism ==
In 1982, Sequoia Park Zoo was home to a family of four black bears, two parents, and their two offspring. The bears lived in an old-fashioned metal bar exhibit. The local community raised money to build a modern bear exhibit. During the construction of the new exhibit, the two bear cubs were sent to live at the Woodland Wildlife Park in Cave Junction, Oregon. The two adult bears were euthanized. Public reaction to the bears being euthanized was extremely negative, with protesters gathering and picketing in front of the zoo, and a petition calling for the zoo's closure gathered 5,000 signatures in the local community of 24,000. The incident received national media coverage. The zoo's director was subsequently replaced.

In 2012, the zoo faced steep criticism because of its budget. The zoo's budget had doubled in size since 2002 while other departments within the City of Eureka had faced multimillion-dollar budget cuts in the same period of time. Closure of the zoo was proposed by multiple local media sources and by prominent local politicians.

== See also ==
- Turtle Bay Exploration Park
