= Eureka City Schools District =

School district in California

Eureka City Unified School District

Location
- 2100 J Street; Eureka, California 95501 United States

District information
- NCES District ID: 0600052

Students and staff
- Students: 3,540
- Teachers: 161.84 (FTE)
- Staff: 226.78 (FTE)
- Student–teacher ratio: 21.87

Other information
- Website: www.eurekacityschools.org

Eureka City Unified School District is a public school district based in Humboldt County, California, United States. Eureka City Schools Administration is located in Eureka, California.

The district oversees 12 schools:

- Alice Birney School K–5
- Eureka Adult School
- Eureka High School 9–12
- Grant School K–5
- Lafayette School K–5
- Lincoln School K–5 (closed pre-2013)
- Washington School K–5
- Winship Middle School 6–8
- Winzler Children's Center
- Zane Middle School 7–8
- Zoe Barnum High School
