= KATA (AM) =

Radio station in Arcata, California

- Arcata, California; United States
- Broadcast area: Eureka, California
- Frequency: 1340 kHz
- Branding: ESPN 107.3 / 1340

Programming
- Format: Sports
- Affiliations: CBS Sports Radio; ESPN Radio

Ownership
- Owner: Bicoastal Media Licenses II, LLC
- Sister stations: KEJB, KFMI, KKHB, KRED

History
- First air date: 1957
- Call sign meaning: Arcata

Technical information
- Licensing authority: FCC
- Facility ID: 41244
- Class: C
- Power: 1,000 watts unlimited
- Transmitter coordinates: 40°51′12.5″N 124°5′5.2″W
- Translator: 107.3 K297BY (Arcata)

Links
- Public license information: Public file; LMS
- Webcast: Listen live
- Website: kata1340.com

KATA (1340 kHz) is a sports radio format AM radio station. Licensed to Arcata, California, United States, the station is owned by Bicoastal Media Licenses II, LLC.

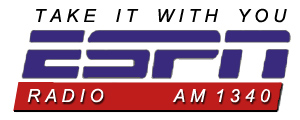
Former logo
