= KKHB =

- Eureka, California; United States
- Broadcast area: Eureka area
- Frequency: 105.5 MHz
- Branding: Cool 105.5

Programming
- Format: Classic hits
- Affiliations: Westwood One

Ownership
- Owner: Bicoastal Media Licenses II, LLC
- Sister stations: KATA, KEJB, KFMI, KRED

History
- First air date: 1993
- Former call signs: KECU (1988–1988); KECA (1988–1993); KGOE (1993–1996)

Technical information
- Licensing authority: FCC
- Facility ID: 61580
- Class: C1
- ERP: 28,000 watts
- HAAT: 484 meters (1,588 ft)
- Transmitter coordinates: 40°43′50″N 123°57′07″W
- Translator: 103.1 K276AV (Happy Camp)

Links
- Public license information: Public file; LMS
- Webcast: Listen live
- Website: cool1055.com

KKHB (105.5 FM) is a radio station broadcasting a classic hits format. Licensed to Eureka, California, United States, the station serves the Eureka area. The station is currently owned by Bicoastal Media Licenses II, LLC and features programming from Jones Radio Network.

== History ==
The station went on the air as KECU on February 16, 1988. On February 18, 1988, the station changed its call sign to KECA and on August 30, 1993, to KGOE. On August 23, 1996, the station became the current KKHB.

Former logo
