= KRED (FM) =

Coordinates: 40.727°N 123.975°W

- Eureka, California; United States
- Frequency: 92.3 MHz
- Branding: Big Red Country

Programming
- Format: Country

Ownership
- Owner: Bicoastal Media Licenses II, LLC
- Sister stations: KATA, KEJB, KFMI, KKHB

History
- First air date: 1979
- Former call signs: KPDJ (1979–1986); KRED-FM (1986–2013)
- Call sign meaning: The word "red"

Technical information
- Licensing authority: FCC
- Facility ID: 35530
- Class: C1
- ERP: 25,000 watts
- HAAT: 469 meters (1,539 ft)
- Translator: 98.3 K252BI (Fortuna)

Links
- Public license information: Public file; LMS
- Webcast: Listen live
- Website: kred923.com

KRED (92.3 FM) is a commercial radio station licensed to Eureka, California, United States. The station went on the air in 1979 as KPDJ and aired an adult contemporary format. In 1986, KPDJ adopted the call letters of its sister station 1340 KRED and became KRED-FM. The AM station is now KATA. KRED-FM switched to a country music format in 1989.
