= King Salmon, California =

Unincorporated community in California, United States

- Unincorporated community
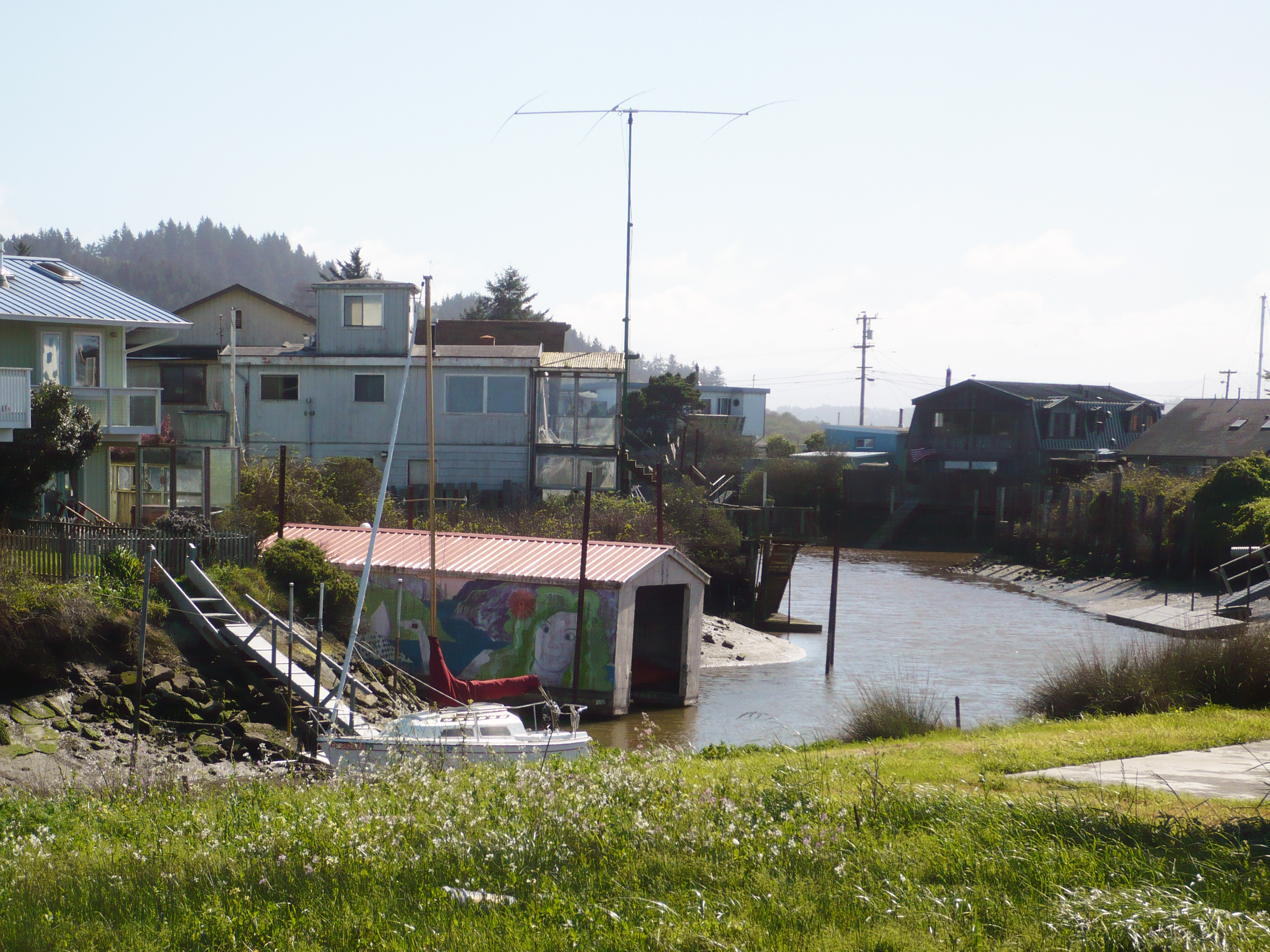
- Houses are built along canals in King Salmon

- Location in California
- Coordinates: 40°44′21″N 124°13′07″W
- Country: United States
- State: California
- County: Humboldt
- Elevation: 3.3 ft (1 m)

King Salmon is an unincorporated community in Humboldt County, California, United States, located on the shore of Buhne Point directly across from the entrance to Humboldt Bay, slightly south of Eureka and 1 mile (1.6 km) north of Fields Landing, at an elevation of 3 feet (0.91 m). It has a Eureka zipcode and area code and is part of Greater Eureka.

== Overview ==
Once a small fishing enclave, primarily containing summer homes or vacation homes and is the former site of the Humboldt Bay Nuclear Power Plant. The Sequoia Humane Society is a privately funded no-kill shelter for dogs and cats that sponsors "Woofstock" every year at Eureka's Halvorsen Park.

King Salmon is served by the Redwood Transit System, has marina services and a recreational vehicle park as well as a public picnic area on the top of Buhne Point adjacent to the power plant. Construction of a groin in 1983 slowed erosion along the shoreline of King Salmon, sand was added to make the beach.

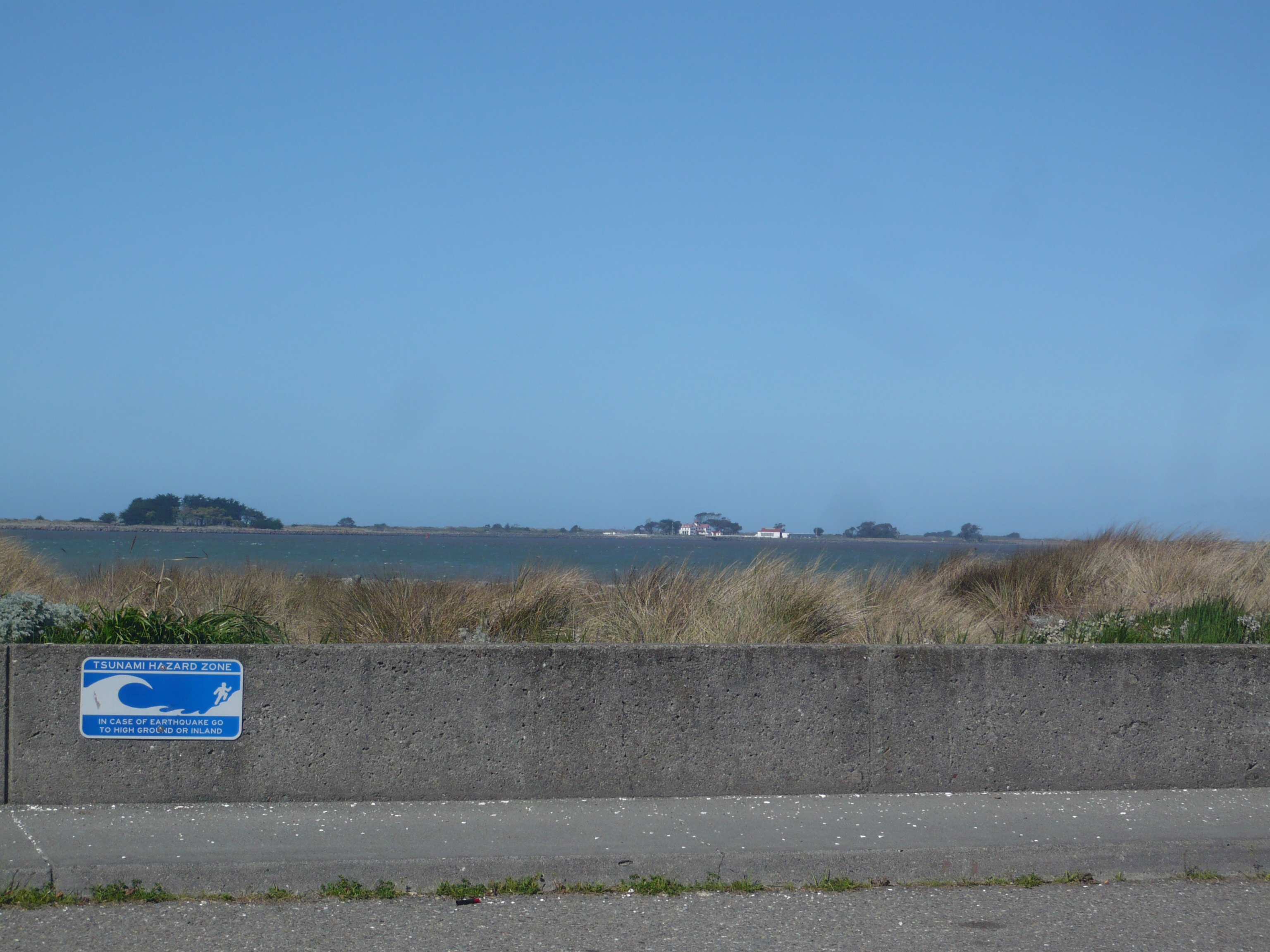
The mouth of Humboldt Bay as seen from King Salmon
