= Eureka Marsh =

Coordinates: 40°47′8.96″N 124°11′19.95″W

Eureka Marsh (previously known as Palco Marsh) is an area adjacent to Humboldt Bay on the coast of the Pacific Ocean in Humboldt County, California.

Eureka Marsh is located entirely within the City of Eureka, and contains over 100 acres (0.40 km^{2}) of both salt and freshwater marshes, wetlands, and estuary area.

== See also ==
- Category: Marshes of California
- Category: Wetlands of California
