= KINS-FM =

- Blue Lake, California; United States
- Broadcast area: Eureka, California
- Frequency: 106.3 MHz

Programming
- Format: News/Talk
- Affiliations: Fox News Radio; Compass Media Networks; Radio America; Red Apple Media; Salem Radio Network; Westwood One

Ownership
- Owner: Eureka Broadcasting Co., Inc.

History
- First air date: 2007 (as KEJY)
- Former call signs: KEJY (2006–2011)

Technical information
- Licensing authority: FCC
- Facility ID: 165975
- Class: C2
- ERP: 3,300 watts
- HAAT: 516 meters
- Transmitter coordinates: 40°43′38.90″N 123°58′17.00″W

Links
- Public license information: Public file; LMS
- Webcast: Listen Live
- Website: kins1063.com

KINS-FM (106.3 MHz) is a radio station broadcasting a news/talk format. Licensed to Blue Lake, California, United States, the station is currently owned by Eureka Broadcasting Co., Inc. and features programming from Fox News Radio, Compass Media Networks, Radio America, Red Apple Media, Salem Radio Network, and Westwood One.
