= Eureka, California =

City in the United States

- City
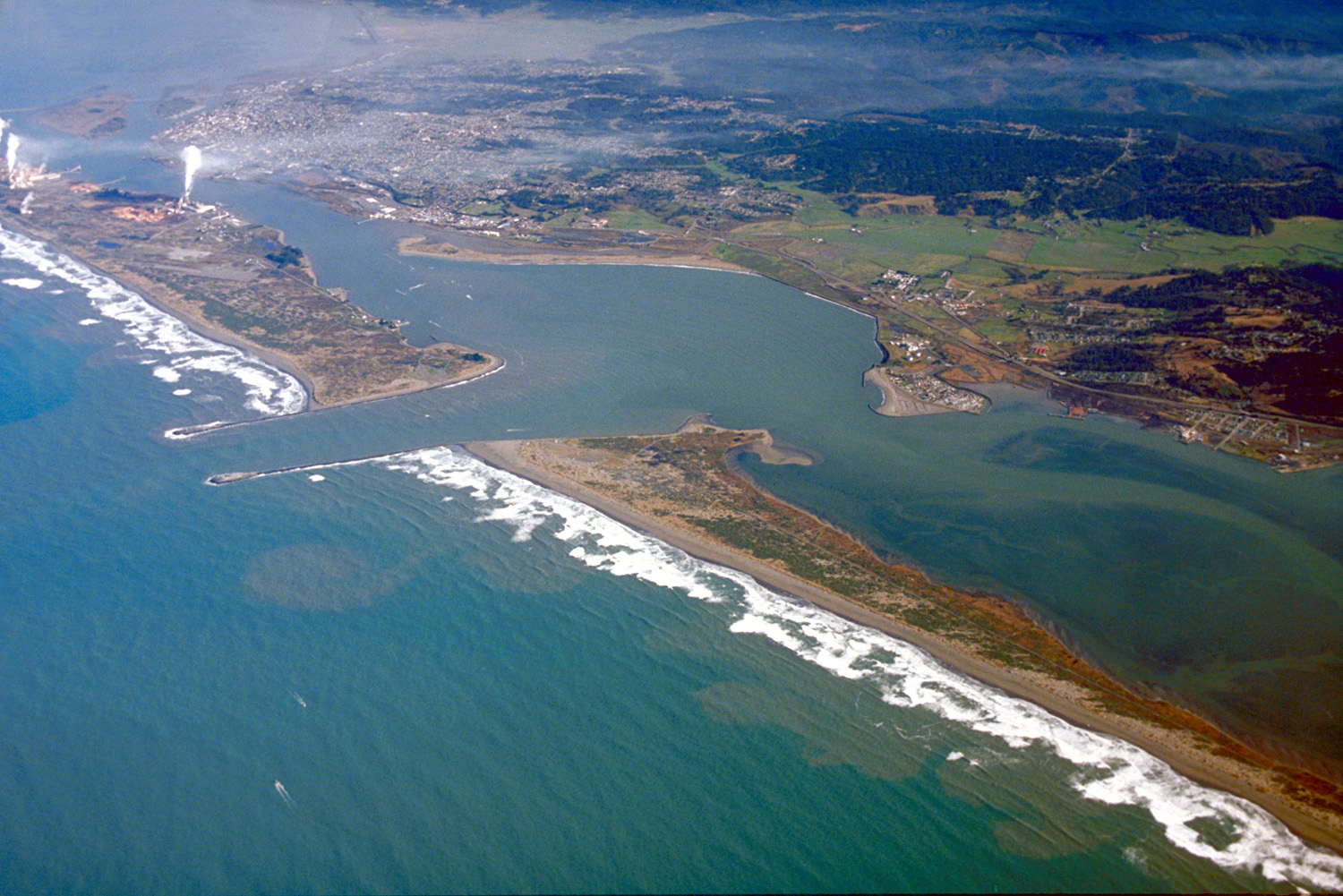
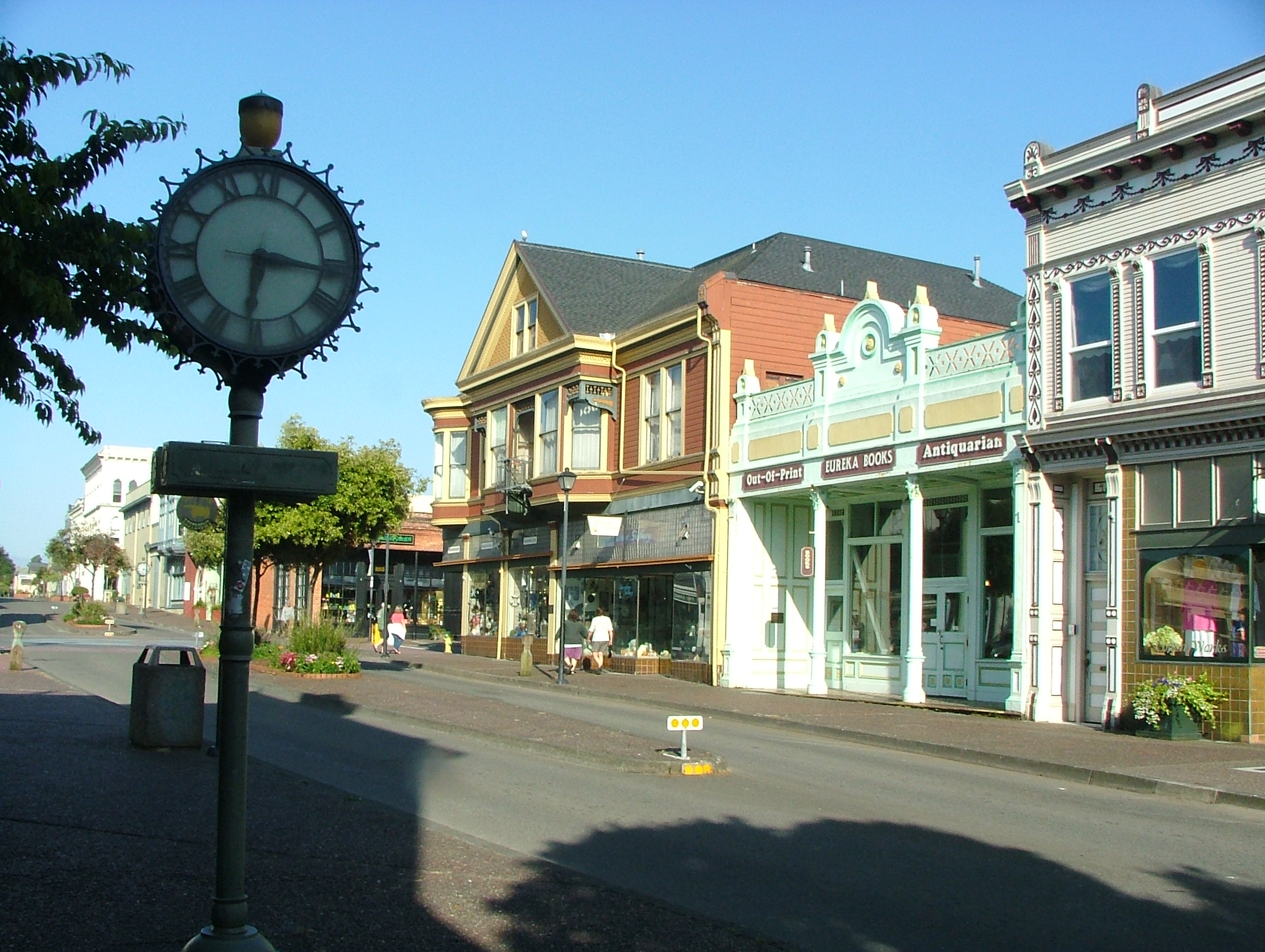
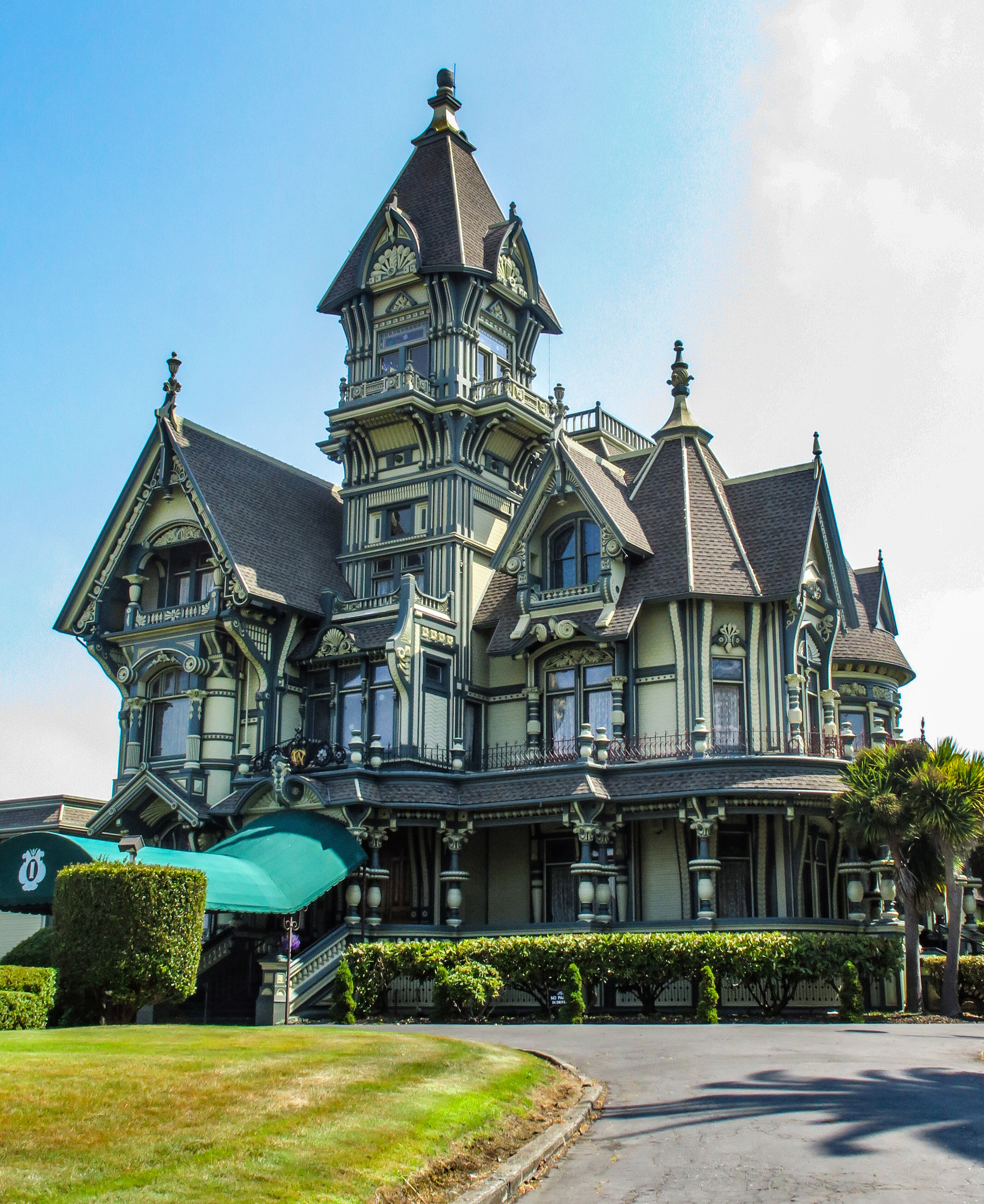
- Eureka on Humboldt Bay Old Town Eureka Carson Mansion

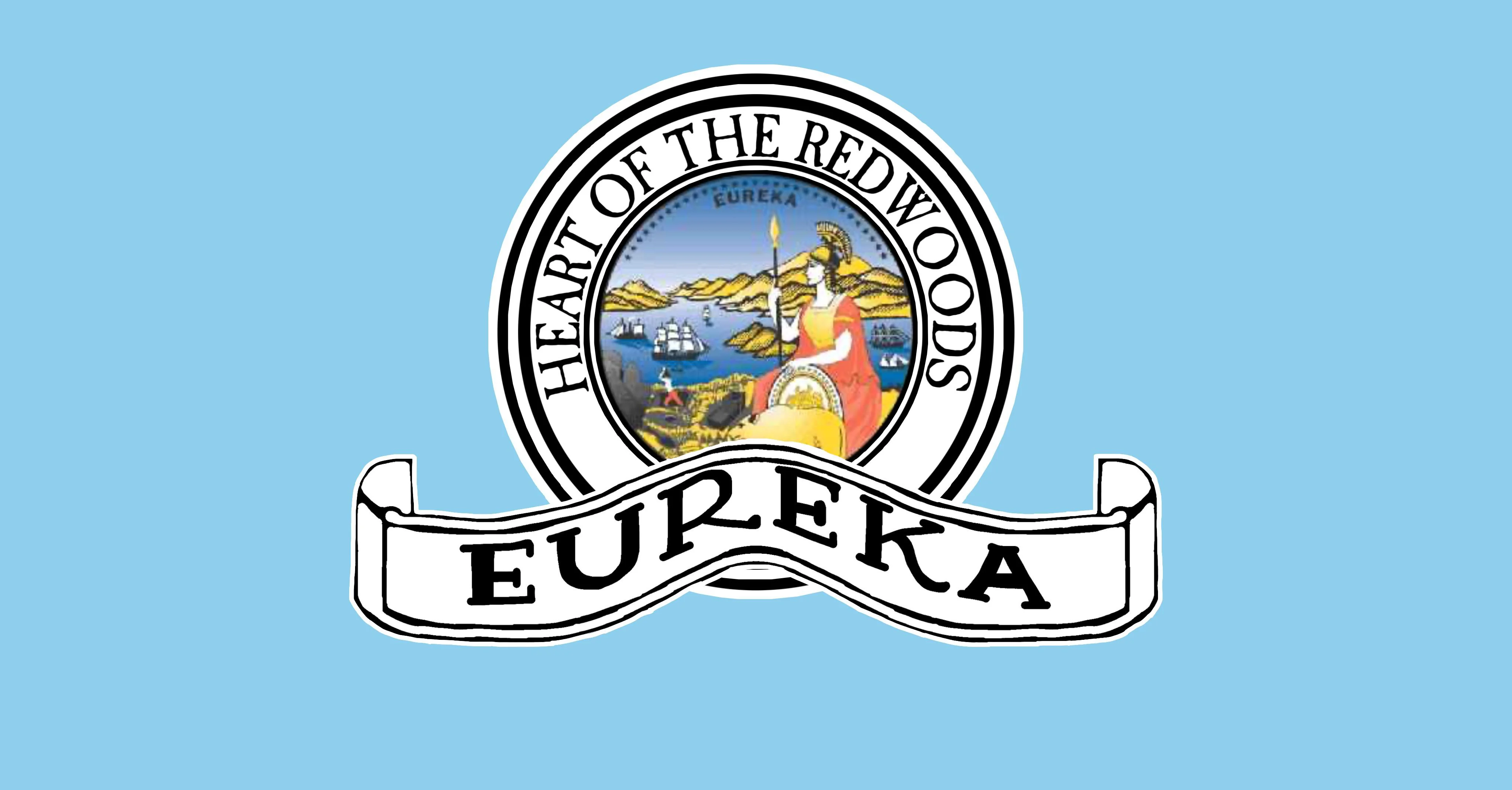
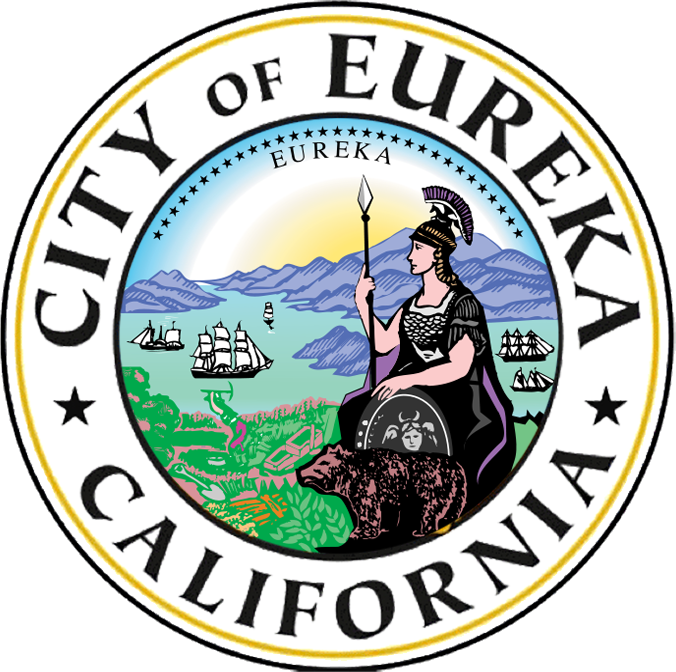
- Flag Seal
- Motto: Eureka! (I have found it!)
- Interactive map of Eureka, California
- Location within California Location within the United States
- Coordinates: 40°48′07″N 124°09′49″W
- Country: United States
- State: California
- County: Humboldt
- Founded: May 13, 1850
- Incorporated (town): April 18, 1856
- Re-incorporated (city): February 19, 1874

Government
  - Type: Council-Manager
  - Mayor: Kim Bergel
  - City manager: Miles Slattery
  - State senator: Mike McGuire (D)
  - Assemblymember: Chris Rogers (D)
  - U. S. rep.: Jared Huffman (D)

Area
  - City: 14.45 sq mi (37.43 km^{2})
  - Land: 9.38 sq mi (24.30 km^{2})
  - Water: 5.07 sq mi (13.13 km^{2}) 35.07%
  - Urban: 18.497 sq mi (47.908 km^{2})
- Elevation: 39 ft (12 m)

Population (2020)
  - City: 26,512
  - Density: 2,846.3/sq mi (1,098.96/km^{2})
  - Urban: 48,119
- Demonym: Eurekan
- Time zone: UTC−08:00 (Pacific)
  - Summer (DST): UTC−07:00 (PDT)
- ZIP Codes: 95501–95503, 95534
- Area code: 707, 369
- FIPS code: 06-23042
- GNIS feature IDs: 277605, 2410463
- Website: www.eurekaca.gov

California Historical Landmark
- Reference no.: 477

Eureka (/jʊˈriːkə/ yuurr-EE-kə; Wiyot: Jaroujiji; Hupa: dahwilahłding; Karok: Uuth) is a city in and the county seat of Humboldt County, located on the North Coast of California. The city is located on U.S. Route 101 on the shores of Humboldt Bay, 270 miles (435 km) north of San Francisco and 100 miles (161 km) south of the Oregon border. At the 2020 census, the population of the city was 26,512 and the population of the greater Eureka area was 48,119.

Eureka is the largest coastal city between San Francisco and Portland, Oregon, and the westernmost city of more than 25,000 residents in the 48 contiguous states. The proximity to the sea causes the city to have a maritime climate with very small annual temperature differences and seasons mainly being defined by the rainy winters and dry summers, whereas nearby inland areas are much hotter in summer. It is the regional center for government, health care, trade, and the arts on the North Coast north of the San Francisco Bay Area. Greater Eureka, one of California's major commercial fishing ports, is the location of the largest deep-water port between San Francisco and Coos Bay, a stretch of about 500 miles (805 km).

The headquarters of both the Six Rivers National Forest and the North Coast Redwoods District of the California State Parks System are in Eureka. As entrepôt for hundreds of lumber mills that once existed in the area, the city played a leading role in the historic West Coast lumber trade. The entire city is a state historic landmark, which has hundreds of significant Victorian homes, including the nationally recognized Carson Mansion, and the city has retained its original 19th-century commercial core as a nationally recognized Old Town Historic District. Eureka is home to California's oldest zoo, the Sequoia Park Zoo.

== History ==
=== Native Americans ===
The Wiyot people lived in Jaroujiji (Wiyot for 'where you sit and rest'), now known as Eureka, for thousands of years before European arrival. Their traditional coastal homeland ranges from the Little River in the north to Bear River Ridge in the south, including the entire coastline of Humboldt Bay, stretching inland to the mountains. The Wiyot people are particularly known for their basketry and fishery management. An extensive collection of intricate basketry of the area's indigenous groups exists in the Clarke Historical Museum in Old Town Eureka.

The Yurok people share linguistic and cultural practices with the Wiyot people, and their traditional territory is located to the north of Eureka. The Yurok Tribe's language revitalization program is seen by many as the most successful of its kind in California, and as of 2013, Eureka High School has the largest Yurok language program of any school.

=== Founding on Humboldt Bay ===
For nearly 300 years after 1579, European exploration of the coast of what would become northern California repeatedly missed definitively locating Humboldt Bay because of a combination of geographic features and weather conditions which concealed the narrow bay entrance from view. Despite a well-documented 1806 sighting by Russian explorers, the bay was not definitively known by Europeans until an 1849 overland exploration provided a reliable accounting of the exact location of what is the second-largest bay in California. The timing of this discovery led to the May 13, 1850, founding of the settlement of Eureka on its shore by the Union and Mendocino Exploring (development) companies.

=== Gold Rush era ===
After the primary California Gold Rush in the Sierras, Humboldt Bay was settled with the intent of providing a convenient alternative to the long overland route from Sacramento to supply miners on the Trinity, Klamath and Salmon Rivers where gold had been discovered. Though the ideal location on Humboldt Bay adjacent to naturally deeper shipping channels ultimately guaranteed Eureka's development as the primary city on the bay, Arcata's proximity to developing supply lines to inland gold mines ensured supremacy over Eureka through 1856.

"Eureka" received its name from a Greek word meaning "I have found it!" This statement of successful (or hopeful) gold rush miners is also the official motto of the State of California. Eureka is the only U.S. location to use the same seal as the state for its seal.

=== Wiyot Massacre ===
Incoming settlers began encroaching on Wiyot people by cutting off their access to ancestral sources of food in addition to the outright theft of their land. Fort Humboldt was established by the U.S. Army on January 30, 1853, to establish peaceful relations between Native Americans, gold-seekers and settlers, often at the expense of the life and liberty of the Native people. The fort was commanded by Brevet Lieutenant Colonel Robert C. Buchanan of the U.S. 4th Infantry Regiment. These tensions between Native people and settlers eventually led to the massacre on Tuluwat Island in 1860. The attackers, who were thought to be composed primarily of Eureka businessmen, killed as many as 250 Wiyot people. The Wiyot men had left the island during their annual World Renewal Ceremony, so the victims were primarily children, women, and elderly tribal members. Major Gabriel J. Rains, Commanding Officer of Fort Humboldt at the time, reported to his commanding officer that a local group of vigilantes had resolved to "kill every peaceable Indian – man, woman, and child." Although the perpetrators were known, they never faced any legal consequences. Remaining Wiyot people took refuge at Fort Humboldt, but they were not given adequate living accommodations, and so half of them died from starvation or exposure.

In 2004, the City of Eureka voted unanimously to return 45 acres (18 ha) of Tuluwat Island to the Wiyot Tribe as an act of reparation.

=== Lumber industry ===
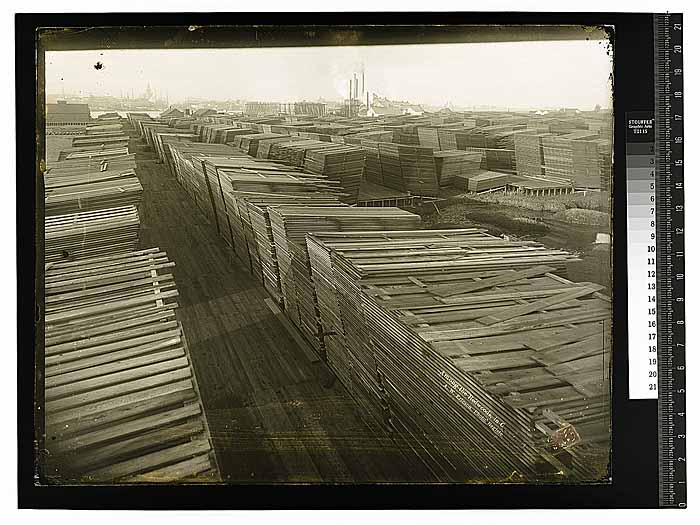
Mill yard across the bay from Eureka

Eureka's first post office opened in 1853 just as the town began to carve its grid plan into the edge of a forest it would ultimately consume to feed the building of San Francisco and points beyond. Many of the first immigrants who arrived as prospectors were also lumbermen, and the vast potential for industry on the bay was soon realized, especially as many hopeful gold miners realized the difficulty and infrequency of striking it rich in the mines. By 1854, after only four years since the founding, seven of nine mills processing timber into marketable lumber on Humboldt Bay were within Eureka. A year later, 140 lumber schooners operated in and out of Humboldt Bay moving lumber from the mills to booming cities along the Pacific coast. By the time the charter for Eureka was granted in 1856, busy mills inside the city had a daily production capacity of 220,000 board feet. This level of production, which would grow significantly and continue for more than a century, secured Eureka as the "timber capital" of California. Eureka was at the apex of rapid growth of the lumber industry because of its location between huge coast redwood forests and its control of the primary port facilities. Loggers brought the enormous redwood trees down. Dozens of movable narrow gauge railroads brought trainloads of logs and finished lumber products to the main rail line, which led directly to Eureka's wharf and waiting schooners. By the 1880s, railroads eventually brought the production of hundreds of mills throughout the region to Eureka, primarily for shipment through its port. After the early 1900s, shipment of products occurred by trucks, trains, and ships from Eureka, Humboldt Bay, and other points in the region, but Eureka remained the busy center of all this activity for over 120 years. These factors and others made Eureka a significant city in early California state history.

=== Commercial center ===
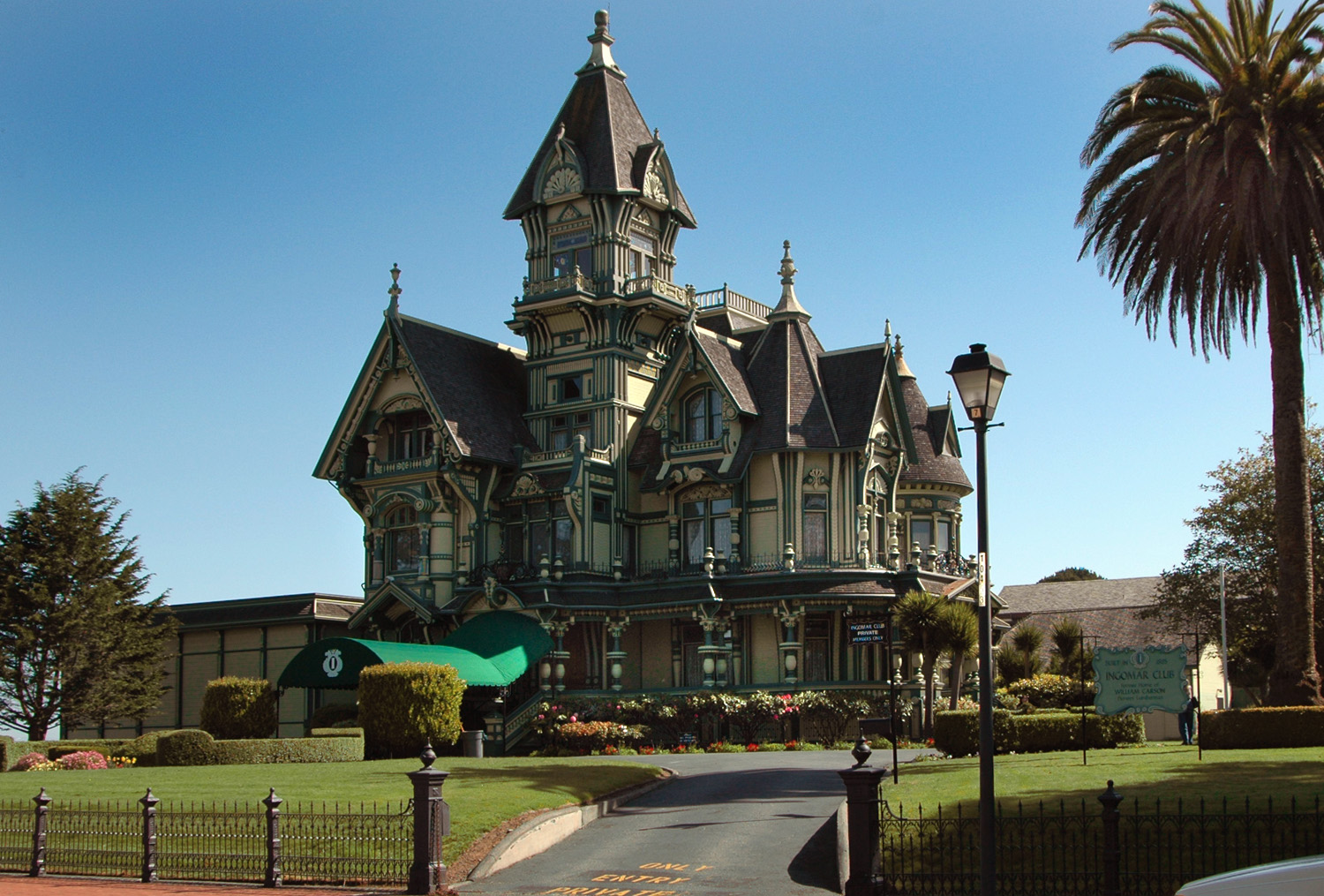
The Carson Mansion (1886) in Eureka's Old Town

A commercial district with Victorian-style buildings rose near the waterfront in the late 19th century, reflecting prosperity experienced during this era. Hundreds of these Victorian homes remain today, of which many are restored and a few have remained in their original state. The Carson Mansion on 2nd and M Streets is a notable example. The home was built between 1884 and 1886 by renowned 19th-century architects Newsom and Newsom for lumber baron William M. Carson. This project was designed to keep mill workers and expert craftsman busy during a slow period in the industry. Old Town Eureka, the original downtown center, has been restored and has become an arts center. The Old Town area has been declared an Historic District by the National Register of Historic Places. The district is made up of over 150 buildings including lodgings, restaurants, and small shops selling items from glassware to wood-burning stoves, and a variety of locally created art.

=== Fishing, shipping, and boating ===
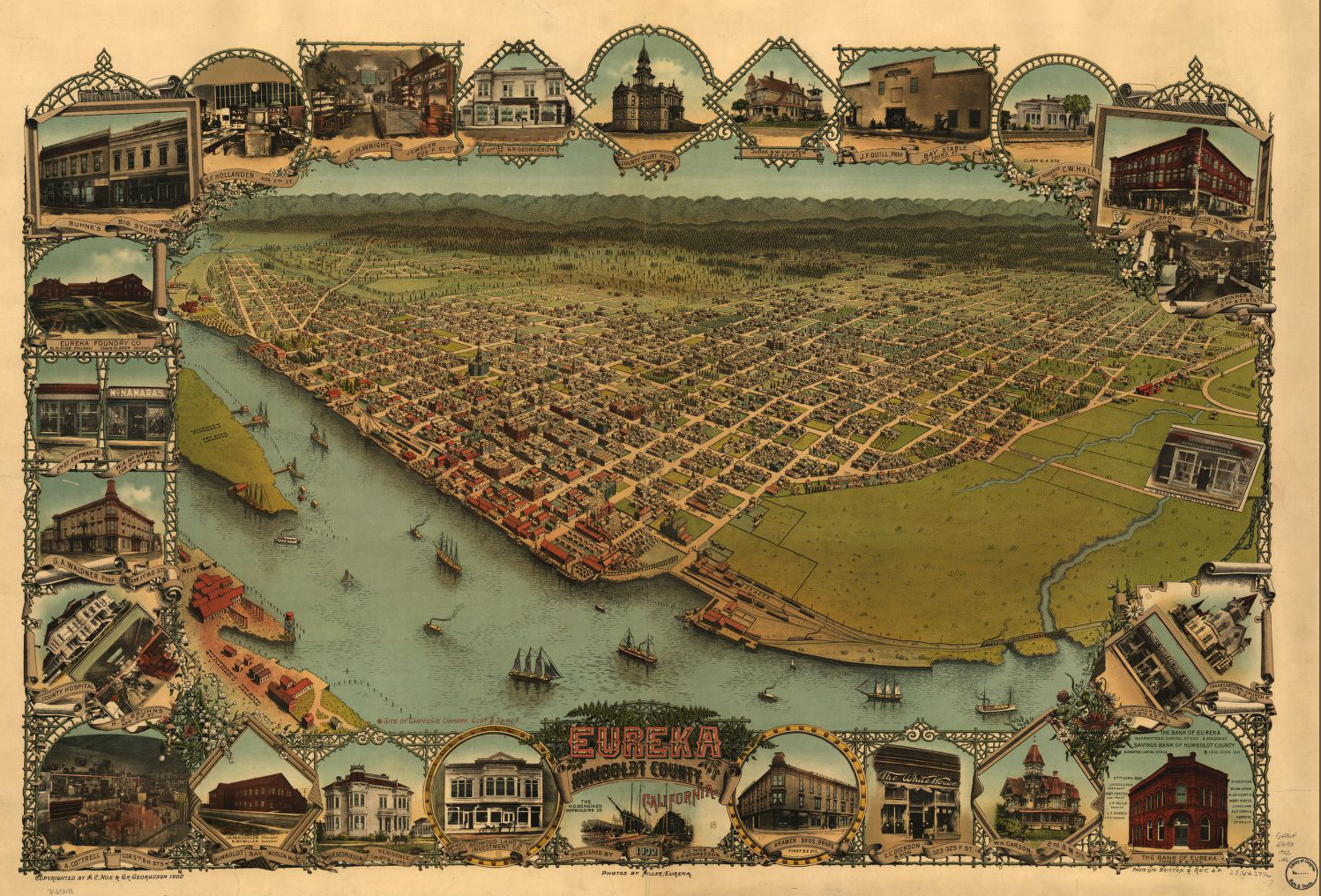
Illustrated map of Eureka (1902)

Eureka's founding and livelihood was and remains linked to Humboldt Bay, the Pacific Ocean, and related industries, especially fishing. Salmon fisheries sprang up along the Eel River as early as 1851, and, within seven years, 2,000 barrels of cured fish and 50,000 pounds (23,000 kg) of smoked salmon were processed and shipped out of Humboldt Bay annually from processing plants on Eureka's wharf. In 1858, the first of many ships built in Eureka was launched, beginning an industry that spanned scores of years. The bay is also the site of the West Coast's largest oyster farming operations, which began its commercial status in the nineteenth century. Eureka is the home port to more than 100 fishing vessels (with an all-time high of over 400 in 1981) in two modern marinas which can berth approximately 400 boats within the city limits and at least 50 more in nearby Fields Landing, which is part of Greater Eureka. Area catches historically include, among other species, salmon, tuna, Dungeness crab, and shrimp, with historic annual total fishing landings totaling about 36,000,000 pounds (16,000,000 kg) in 1981.

=== Chinese expulsion ===
Racist views of Chinese immigrants in the late 19th century led to violent attacks on them by White settlers across the West, both before and after the Chinese Exclusion Act. Economic downturns resulting in competition for jobs fed sinophobia and violent actions against Chinese immigrants, especially on the Pacific coast. In February 1885, Eureka City Councilman David Kendall was caught in the crossfire of two rival Chinese gangs and killed. A group of 600 White vigilantes forcibly and permanently evicted all 480 Chinese residents of Eureka's Chinatown.

Among those who guarded the city jail during the height of the sinophobic tension was James Gillett, who went on to become Governor of California. The anti-Chinese ordinance was repealed in 1959.

=== Queen City of the Ultimate West ===
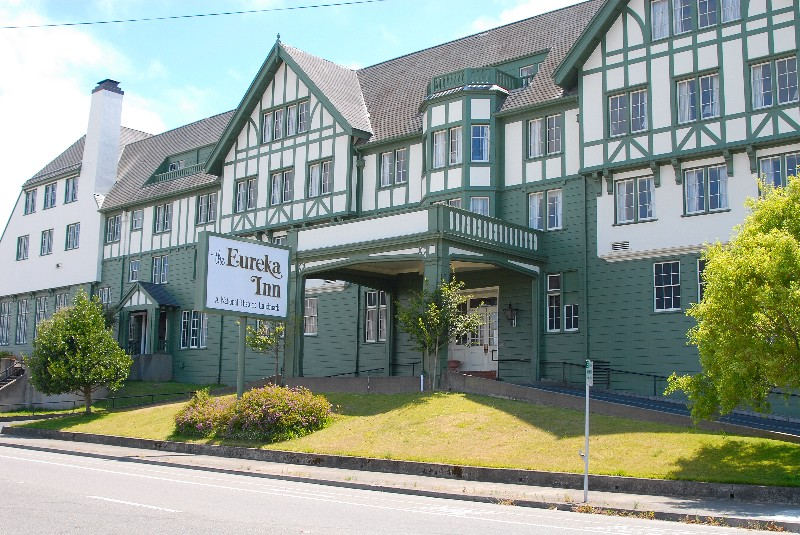
The Tudor Revival–style Eureka Inn (1922)

Completion of the Northwestern Pacific Railroad in 1914 provided the local lumber industry with an alternative to ships for transport of its millions of board feet of lumber to reach markets in San Francisco and beyond. It also provided the first safe land route between San Francisco and Eureka for people to venture to the Redwood Empire. As a result, Eureka's population of 7,300 swelled to 15,000 within ten years. By 1922, the Redwood Highway was completed, providing for the first reliable, direct overland route for automobiles from San Francisco. By 1931, the Eureka Street Railway operated fifteen streetcars over twelve miles (19 km) of track. Eureka's transportation connection to the "outside" world had changed dramatically after more than half a century of stage rides or treacherous steamship passage through the Humboldt Bar and on the Pacific Ocean to San Francisco. The building of the Eureka Inn coincided with the opening of the new road to San Francisco. As a result of immense civic pride during this early-20th-century era of expansion, Eureka officially nicknamed itself "Queen City of the Ultimate West". The tourism industry, lodging to support it, and related marketing had been born.

=== Post–World War II ===
The timber economy of Eureka is part of the Pacific Northwest timber economy which rises and falls with boom-and-bust economic times. In Eureka, both the timber industry and commercial fishing declined after the Second World War.

The Columbus Day Storm of 1962 downed trees and caused a surplus in the domestic timber market, which caused increased shipping to foreign markets. The log trade with Japan and other Pacific Rim nations increased. Despite many rumors to the contrary, little of this wood returned to U.S. markets. In 1989, the U.S. changed log export laws, permitting lower-cost timber from public lands to be exported as raw logs overseas to help balance the federal budget.

After 1990, the global log market declined, and exports fell at the same time as Pacific Northwest log prices increased; leading buyers to seek less expensive logs from Canada and the southern United States. Debate continues among four stakeholders: timber owners, domestic processors, consumers and communities, on the impact of log export on the local economy. During the span of 1991 to 2001, timber harvest peaked in 1997. The local timber market was also affected by the Pacific Lumber Company hostile takeover and ultimate bankruptcy.

Local fisheries expanded through the 1970s and early 1980s. During the 1970s, Eureka fishermen landed more than half of the fish and shellfish produced and consumed in California. In 2010, between 100 and 120 commercial fishing vessels listed Eureka as homeport. The highest landings of all species were 36.9 million lb (16.7 million kg) in 1981 while the lowest were in 2001 with 9.4 million lb (4.3 million kg).

After 1990 regulatory, economic, and other events led to a contraction of the local commercial fleet. In 1991, the Woodley Island marina opened, providing docking facilities for much of Eureka's commercial and recreational fleet. Many species are considered to be overfished. Recreational fishing has increased over time. Fifty percent of recreational fishermen using local boats are tourists from outside the area.

Commercial Pacific oyster aquaculture in Humboldt Bay produced an average of 7,600,000 pounds (3,400,000 kg) of oysters from 1956 to 1965 an average of 844,444 pounds (383,033 kg) per year. In 2004, only 600,000 pounds (270,000 kg) were harvested. Oysters and oyster seed continue to be exported from Humboldt Bay. The value of the oysters and spawn is more than $6 million per year. Consolidation of buyers and landing facilities resulted in local vulnerability to unexpected events, leading the city to obtain grant funding for and complete the Fishermen's Terminal on the waterfront which will provide fish handling, marketing, and public spaces.

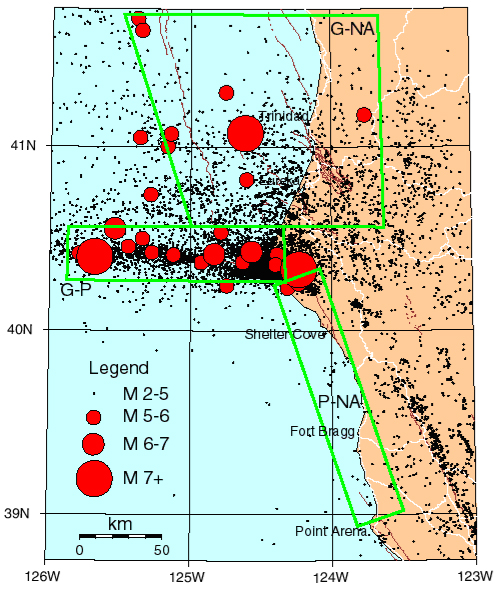
Historical seismicity

=== Significant earthquakes ===
The area regularly experiences large earthquakes as it is situated on the southern end the Cascadia subduction zone and near the San Andreas Fault, which interface around the Mendocino triple junction. On December 20, 2022, a magnitude 6.4 earthquake struck Ferndale, California in Humboldt County, United States at 10:34:25 UTC, or 2:34 a.m. PST. On January 9, 2010, a 6.5 magnitude earthquake occurred about 33 miles (53 km) off shore from Eureka. After two seconds, it became a violent "jumper", making objects fly; the mostly vertical shocks from the ground led to broken windows in shops, overturned shelving in homes and stores, and damage to architectural detail on a number of historic buildings. Local hospitals treated mostly minor related injuries, and electrical power was out over a large area. Numerous natural gas leaks occurred, but no fires resulted. This was the largest recent earthquake since the April 25–26, 1992 sequence. It was followed on February 4, 2010, by a magnitude 5.9 earthquake which struck about 35 miles (56 km) northwest of the community of Petrolia and nearly 50 miles (80 km) west of Eureka. The shaking was felt within a 150-mile (240 km) radius, as far north as southern Oregon and as far south as Sonoma County. The largest recorded in the area was the 7.2 M_{w} event on November 8, 1980. The larger earthquakes can pose a tsunami threat to coastal areas.

== Geography ==
According to the United States Census Bureau, the city has a total area of 14.5 square miles (38 km^{2}), of which 9.4 square miles (24 km^{2}) is land and 5.1 square miles (13 km^{2}) or 35.07% is water.

Eureka is situated within California's Redwood Empire region which includes Pacific Ocean coast, Humboldt Bay, and several rivers in addition to Redwood National and State Parks and Humboldt Redwoods State Park. The location of Eureka on U.S. Route 101 is 283 miles (455 km) north of San Francisco and 315 mi (507 km) northwest of Sacramento.

The city marina is on one of three islands at a narrow point on the 13-mile-long (21 km) bay and increases in elevation slightly as it spreads north, south, and especially to the east. The city gently encroaches at least two miles (3.2 km) eastward into primarily Redwood and Douglas-fir second growth forests. The city has a traditional grid that generally radiates toward the points of the compass. Most post-1970 houses were built in formerly clear cut forested areas.

The transition between the official city limits and smaller unincorporated areas is mostly not discernible. Eastern areas including secluded developments on a golf course among or in close proximity to extensive second-growth forest have more recently developed. These new houses were built as a result of the Eureka Community Plan of 1995 in attempt to bring locals close to centers of recreation and encourage community interaction. The city then gives way to hills and mountains of the rugged coast range, which quickly exceed 2,000 feet (610 m) in elevation.

Eureka is more or less on the same latitude as Atlantic cities New York City and Porto in Portugal along with the Mediterranean city of Naples in Italy, all of whom have much warmer summers in spite of also being on coastlines. By comparison, New York City's climate is far more continental than Eureka's, despite both cities being located around the 41st parallel and near the ocean.

=== Climate ===
Climate chart for Eureka

Eureka has a mild, temperate cool-summer mediterranean climate (Köppen climate classification: Csb). Due to the influence of the Pacific Ocean and being on the shoreline of the cold-water Humboldt Bay, its temperatures are cooler than those of a typical mediterranean climate. Winters are mild and rainy, and summers are mild, cool, and dry. The average high in December, the coolest month, is 55.0 °F (12.8 °C), while the average high temperature in August, the warmest month, is 64.3 °F (17.9 °C), which is very mild and cool, respectively, for an area at such a southerly latitude. Eureka's average summer temperatures are much cooler than New York City and Istanbul which lie on the same latitude (and its average winter temperatures are also milder than those two cities); and are similar to those of Southeast Alaska, Scotland or Tierra del Fuego in southern Argentina and Chile, which lie well above the 50th parallel.

The seasonal temperature variation is very small; the difference between the August average of 58.5 °F (14.7 °C) and the December average of 47.8 °F (8.8 °C) is only 10.7 °F (5.9 °C), about equal to the diurnal temperature variation. Eureka is unique among mid-latitude climates in the northern hemisphere in that in more than 135 years of recorded temperatures, February has measured a warmer absolute maximum temperature than both the two high summer months of July and August. The absolute maximum temperature of July is merely 77 °F (25 °C) in spite of the high sun strength. The two warmest nights measured in Eureka were both during winter, as January 18, 1981, recorded a low of 63 °F (17 °C), tying a February 26, 1980, record.

In addition, Eureka has a very short and milder range of temperatures compared to most of the contiguous US, with the all-time highest and lowest temperatures recorded in Eureka being only 87 °F (30.6 °C) on October 26, 1993, September 2, 2017, and September 28, 2020, and 20 °F (−6.7 °C) on January 14, 1888, respectively. On average, the highest temperature seen throughout the entire year is only 79 °F (26.1 °C), one of the coolest in the contiguous US, while on average the lowest temperature seen in the year (most often occurring at night) is only a similarly moderate 29 °F (−1.7 °C), yielding a very short and mild temperature range of about 50 °F (28 °C) throughout the year. Additionally, Eureka remains the only city on the West Coast of the continental United States to have never recorded a temperature of 90 °F (32.2 °C).

Temperatures drop to freezing or below only on a few nights per year, and daytime temperatures for these days are typically mild temperatures ranging between 43–58 °F (6.1–14.4 °C). Eureka has never recorded an ice day, with the coldest daytime maximum being 34 °F (1 °C) in 1990. Between 1991 and 2020, the coldest daytime high of the year was 45 °F (7 °C) and the warmest night averaged 59 °F (15 °C). NOAA's weather station averages indicate only 0.18 in (4.6 mm) of rainfall in July, which is well within the mediterranean range, only with rainier winters, cooler and milder air than a typical mediterranean climate. Winter temperatures instead are similar to many climates found in Southern Europe from which basin the climate type is named.

The area experiences coastal fog throughout the year, especially during summer on the coast when temperatures in the city remain consistently around a mild 64 °F (17.8 °C). This phenomenon, together with cool breezes from the Pacific Ocean, keeps Eureka relatively cool and mild, while contrasting with inland areas in relative proximity to Humboldt Bay, which are prone to extreme temperatures that often exceed 100 °F (37.8 °C). This causes frequent temperature differences between Eureka and nearby inland areas during summer and early fall of 30 to 40 °F (17 to 22 °C). Despite the common coastal fog, Eureka enjoys on average about 55% possible sunshine per year, about on par with cities such as Calgary, Portland, New York City and Chicago.

Annual precipitation averages 40.3 in (1,024 mm). Measurable precipitation falls on an average of 127.5 days each year, concentrated heavily from October to April. On average, December is the wettest month, averaging over 8 in (203.2 mm) of precipitation, virtually all of it rain. The wettest "rain year" was from July 1889 to June 1890 with 73.30 in (1,861.8 mm) and the driest from July 1976 to June 1977 with 17.56 in (446.0 mm). The greatest monthly precipitation was 23.21 in (589.5 mm) in December 2002. The greatest 24-hour precipitation was 6.79 in (172.5 mm) on December 27, 2002. However, historic 100-year dramatic weather events such as the Christmas Week flood of 1955 and, especially, the Christmas flood of 1964, which severely damaged the region, may not be reflected in records listed herein. Snowfall on the coast happens only on rare occasions, averaging 0.2 in (0.51 cm) as of the 1981–2010 normals, but only five years during that period received measurable snowfall. The most snowfall in one month was 6.9 in (18 cm) in January 1907.

Climate data for Eureka, California (NWS Forecast Office, Woodley Island) (1991–2020 normals, (Note: Mean monthly maxima and minima (i.e. the highest and lowest temperature readings during an entire month or year) calculated based on data at said location from 1991 to 2020.) extremes 1886–present)
Month	Jan	Feb	Mar	Apr	May	Jun	Jul	Aug	Sep	Oct	Nov	Dec	Year
Record high °F (°C)	78 (26)	85 (29)	78 (26)	80 (27)	84 (29)	85 (29)	77 (25)	82 (28)	87 (31)	87 (31)	81 (27)	77 (25)	87 (31)
Mean maximum °F (°C)	66.1 (18.9)	66.5 (19.2)	65.9 (18.8)	67.6 (19.8)	69.4 (20.8)	69.0 (20.6)	69.4 (20.8)	71.7 (22.1)	74.3 (23.5)	74.8 (23.8)	68.2 (20.1)	64.8 (18.2)	78.4 (25.8)
Mean daily maximum °F (°C)	55.1 (12.8)	55.4 (13.0)	56.1 (13.4)	57.4 (14.1)	59.6 (15.3)	61.9 (16.6)	63.1 (17.3)	64.0 (17.8)	63.9 (17.7)	61.9 (16.6)	57.8 (14.3)	54.7 (12.6)	59.2 (15.1)
Daily mean °F (°C)	47.9 (8.8)	48.4 (9.1)	49.2 (9.6)	50.8 (10.4)	53.7 (12.1)	56.0 (13.3)	57.7 (14.3)	58.5 (14.7)	57.2 (14.0)	54.3 (12.4)	50.5 (10.3)	47.4 (8.6)	52.6 (11.4)
Mean daily minimum °F (°C)	40.8 (4.9)	41.3 (5.2)	42.4 (5.8)	44.2 (6.8)	47.7 (8.7)	50.1 (10.1)	52.4 (11.3)	53.0 (11.7)	50.5 (10.3)	46.8 (8.2)	43.2 (6.2)	40.0 (4.4)	46.0 (7.8)
Mean minimum °F (°C)	31.8 (−0.1)	32.7 (0.4)	34.2 (1.2)	36.6 (2.6)	40.9 (4.9)	44.4 (6.9)	48.6 (9.2)	48.8 (9.3)	44.9 (7.2)	38.7 (3.7)	33.3 (0.7)	30.7 (−0.7)	28.9 (−1.7)
Record low °F (°C)	20 (−7)	24 (−4)	29 (−2)	31 (−1)	35 (2)	40 (4)	43 (6)	44 (7)	36 (2)	32 (0)	27 (−3)	21 (−6)	20 (−7)
Average precipitation inches (mm)	6.67 (169)	5.64 (143)	5.75 (146)	3.64 (92)	1.66 (42)	0.70 (18)	0.18 (4.6)	0.18 (4.6)	0.68 (17)	2.31 (59)	4.89 (124)	8.10 (206)	40.40 (1,026)
Average snowfall inches (cm)	0.0 (0.0)	0.0 (0.0)	0.0 (0.0)	0.0 (0.0)	0.0 (0.0)	0.0 (0.0)	0.0 (0.0)	0.0 (0.0)	0.0 (0.0)	0.0 (0.0)	0.0 (0.0)	0.0 (0.0)	0.0 (0.0)
Average precipitation days (≥ 0.01 in)	16.5	15.4	16.0	13.8	9.3	5.5	3.0	3.5	4.7	8.7	14.3	17.1	127.8
Average snowy days (≥ 0.1 in)	0.1	0.0	0.0	0.0	0.0	0.0	0.0	0.0	0.0	0.0	0.0	0.0	0.1
Mean monthly sunshine hours	140.1	143.7	207.4	253.1	280.5	277.7	273.4	236.5	220.3	175.8	131.3	126.2	2,466
Percentage possible sunshine	47	48	56	63	63	62	60	55	59	51	44	44	55
Source: NOAA (sun 1961–1990)

== Demographics ==
Historical population
Census	Pop.	Note	%±
1860	612		—
1870	2,049		234.8%
1880	2,639		28.8%
1890	4,858		84.1%
1900	7,327		50.8%
1910	11,845		61.7%
1920	12,923		9.1%
1930	15,752		21.9%
1940	17,055		8.3%
1950	23,058		35.2%
1960	28,137		22.0%
1970	24,337		−13.5%
1980	24,153		−0.8%
1990	27,025		11.9%
2000	26,128		−3.3%
2010	27,191		4.1%
2020	26,512		−2.5%
U.S. Decennial Census; 2010–2020

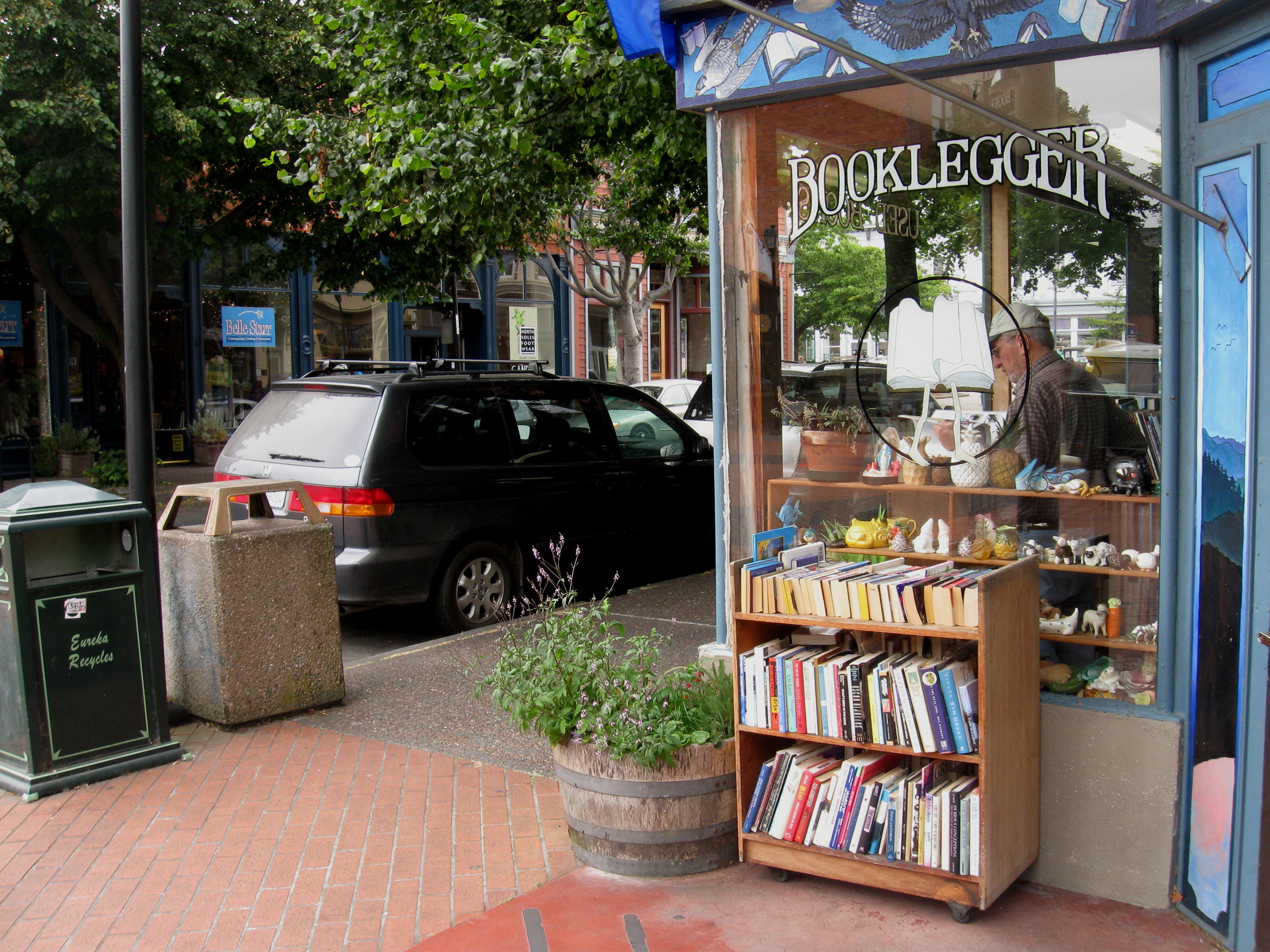
Bookstore in Eureka's Old Town

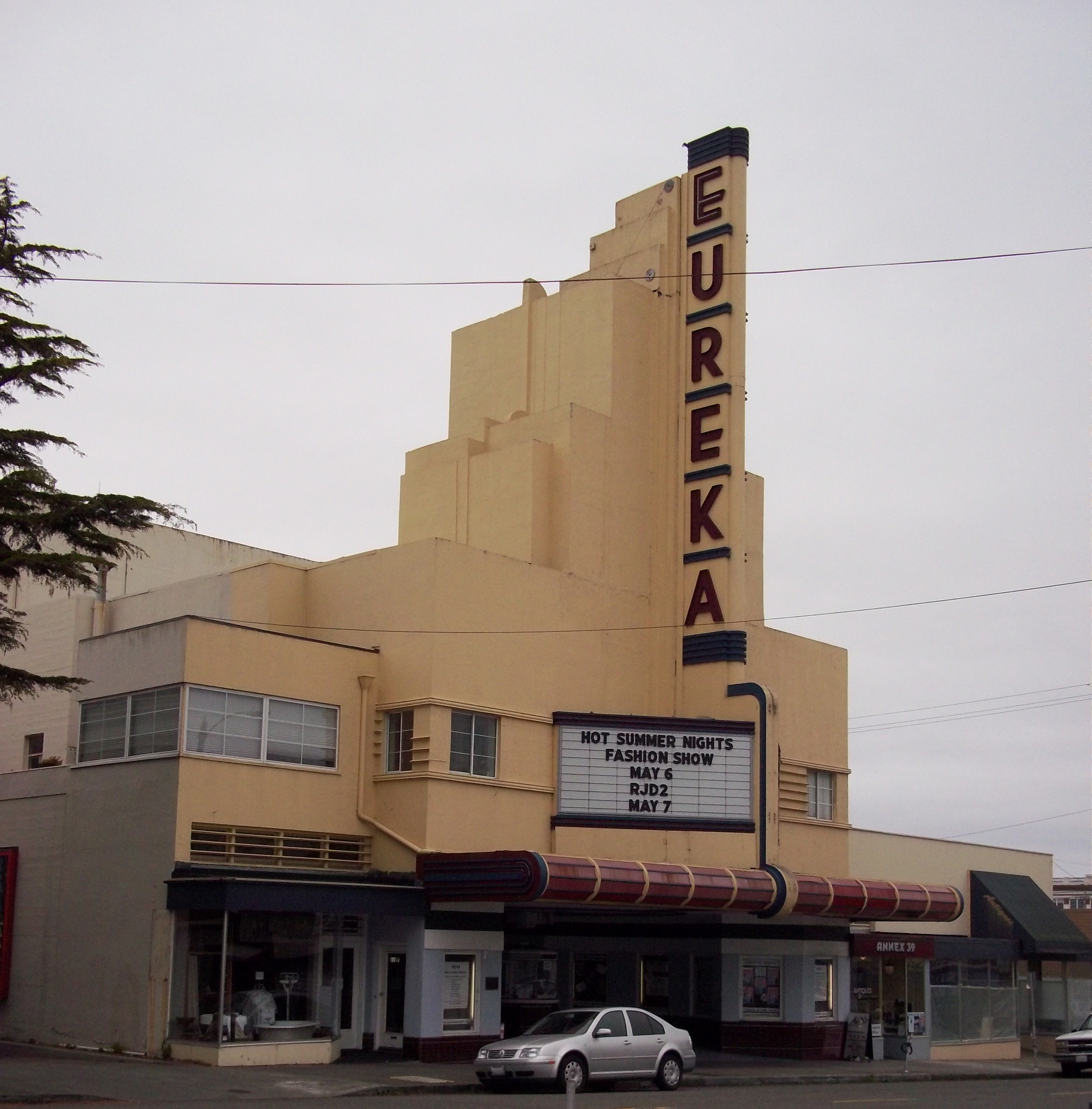
The Eureka Theatre (built in 1937) is on the National Register of Historic Places. It is built in the Streamline Moderne style.

The population of the city was 27,191 at the 2010 census, up from 26,128 at the 2000 census, representing a 4.1% increase, and the population of Greater Eureka was 45,034 at the 2010 Census, up from 43,452 at the 2000 census, representing a 3.6% increase.

According to a report by the City of Eureka, the Greater Eureka area minimally includes the unincorporated adjacent or nearby neighborhoods and Census Defined Populated Areas of Bayview, Cutten, Elk River, Freshwater, Humboldt Hill, Indianola, Myrtletown, Pine Hill, Ridgewood Heights, and Rosewood, all of which have Eureka addresses, postal zip codes and Eureka-specific telephone numbers. The Greater Eureka area makes up the largest urban settlement on the Pacific Coast between San Francisco and Portland. This area is similar to what the U.S. Census officially defines as the Eureka UC (urban cluster), which is a "densely settled core of census tracts and/or census blocks that meet minimum population density requirements, along with adjacent territory containing non-residential urban land uses as well as territory with low population density included to link outlying densely settled territory with the densely settled core" of up to 50,000 in population. The bayside communities of Manila, Samoa, and Fairhaven, California (all on the Samoa Peninsula), and King Salmon and Fields Landing (both located south of the city), and communities listed above, with the exception of Elk River and Freshwater, are shown to be part of the Eureka Urban Cluster. Eureka is the largest city of the Eureka-Arcata-Fortuna Micropolitan Area, a construct of the U.S. Census Bureau, which is synonymous with the County of Humboldt.

=== Racial and ethnic composition ===
Race and Ethnicity
Racial and ethnic composition	2000	2010	2020
White (non-Hispanic)	78.64%	73.85%	64.38%
Hispanic or Latino (of any race)	7.77%	11.56%	15.14%
Two or more races (non-Hispanic)	4.19%	4.5%	8.0%
Asian (non-Hispanic)	3.44%	4.13%	5.53%
Native American (non-Hispanic)	3.91%	3.32%	3.43%
Black or African American (non-Hispanic)	1.53%	1.83%	1.91%
Pacific Islander (non-Hispanic)	0.32%	0.62%	0.86%
Other (non-Hispanic)	0.2%	0.19%	0.75%

=== 2020 census ===
As of the 2020 census, Eureka had a population of 26,512. The median age was 38.6 years. 19.4% of residents were under the age of 18 and 17.8% of residents were 65 years of age or older. For every 100 females there were 99.7 males, and for every 100 females age 18 and over there were 98.0 males age 18 and over.

99.5% of residents lived in urban areas, while 0.5% lived in rural areas. There were 11,951 housing units, of which 6.8% were vacant. The homeowner vacancy rate was 1.3% and the rental vacancy rate was 3.8%.

There were 11,141 households in Eureka, of which 24.5% had children under the age of 18 living in them. Of all households, 30.5% were married-couple households, 24.9% were households with a male householder and no spouse or partner present, and 32.6% were households with a female householder and no spouse or partner present. About 36.4% of all households were made up of individuals and 14.9% had someone living alone who was 65 years of age or older.

=== 2010 census ===
The 2010 United States census reported that Eureka had a population of 27,191. The population density was 1,881.3 inhabitants per square mile (726.4/km^{2}). The racial makeup of Eureka was 21,565 (79.3%) White, 514 (1.9%) African American, 1,011 (3.7%) Native American, 1,153 (4.2%) Asian, 176 (0.6%) Pacific Islander, 1,181 (4.3%) from other races, and 1,591 (5.9%) from two or more races. There were 3,143 Hispanic or Latino people of any race (11.6%).

The census reported that 25,308 people (93.1% of the population) lived in households, 1,434 (5.3%) lived in non-institutionalized group quarters, and 449 (1.7%) were institutionalized.

There were 11,150 households, out of which 2,891 (25.9%) had children under the age of 18 living in them, 3,554 (31.9%) were opposite-sex married couples living together, 1,449 (13.0%) had a female householder with no husband present, 710 (6.4%) had a male householder with no wife present. There were 1,161 (10.4%) unmarried opposite-sex partnerships, and 146 (1.3%) same-sex married couples or partnerships. 3,971 households (35.6%) were made up of individuals, and 1,183 (10.6%) had someone living alone who was 65 years of age or older. The average household size was 2.27. There were 5,713 families (51.2% of all households); the average family size was 2.93.

There were 5,431 residents (20.0%) under the age of 18, 3,102 (11.4%) aged 18 to 24, 8,021 (29.5%) aged 25 to 44, 7,422 (27.3%) aged 45 to 64, and 3,215 (11.8%) who were 65 years of age or older. The median age was 36.2 years. For every 100 females, there were 106.0 males. For every 100 females age 18 and over, there were 105.7 males. There were 11,891 housing units at an average density of 822.7 units per square mile (317.6 units/km^{2}), of which 11,150 were occupied, of which 4,829 (43.3%) were owner-occupied, and 6,321 (56.7%) were occupied by renters. The homeowner vacancy rate was 2.0%; the rental vacancy rate was 3.7%. 11,251 people (41.4% of the population) lived in owner-occupied housing units and 14,057 people (51.7%) lived in rental housing units.

=== 2000 census ===
As of the 2000 census, there were 26,128 people. The population density was 2,764.5 inhabitants per square mile (1,067.4/km^{2}). There were 11,637 housing units at an average density of 1,231.3 units per square mile (475.4 units/km^{2}). The racial makeup of the city was 88.5% White, 1.2% Black or African American, 4.2% Native American, 2.6% Asian, 0.3% Pacific Islander, 2.7% from other races, and 5.10% from two or more races. Hispanic or Latino people of any race were 10.8% of the population.

There were 10,957 households, out of which 25.8% had children under the age of 18 living with them, 34.8% were married couples living together, 14.0% had a female householder with no husband present, and 46.3% were non-families. 35.3% of all households were made up of individuals, and 11.8% had someone living alone who was 65 years of age or older. The average household size was 2.26 and the average family size was 2.93. In the city, the population dispersal was 22.4% under the age of 18, 11.6% from 18 to 24, 28.9% from 25 to 44, 23.5% from 45 to 64, and 13.7% who were 65 years of age or older. The median age was 37 years. For every 100 females, there were 98.1 males. For every 100 females age 18 and over, there were 95.7 males.

The median income for a household in the city was $25,849, and the median income for a family was $33,438. Males had a median income of $28,706 versus $22,038 for females. The per capita income for the city was $16,174. About 15.8% of families and 23.7% of the population were below the poverty line, including 29.6% of those under the age of 18 and 11.1% of those 65 and older.

== Economy ==
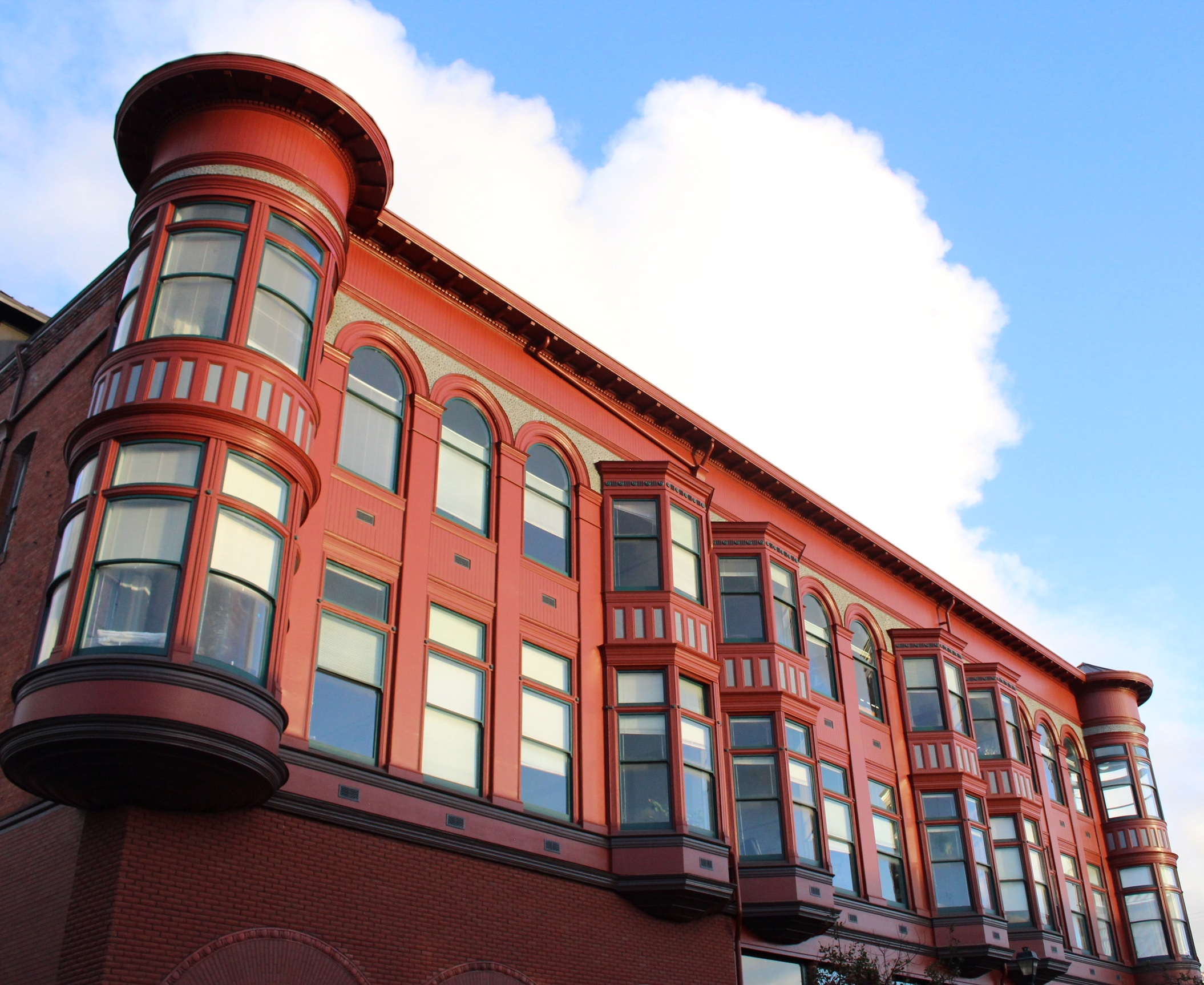
Carson Block Building

The economic base of the city was founded on timber and fishing and supplying resources for the gold mining efforts further inland. Gold mining diminished quickly in the early years, and activities of timber and fishing have also diminished, especially in the latter decades of the twentieth century. Today, the major industries are tourism, timber (in value), and healthcare and services (in number of jobs). As a part of the Emerald Triangle, Eureka is known for the sale of cannabis and as a center for cannabis tourism. Major employers today in Eureka include the following governmental entities: College of the Redwoods, The County of Humboldt, and the Humboldt County Office of Education. St. Joseph Hospital is the largest private employer in Eureka.

== Government ==
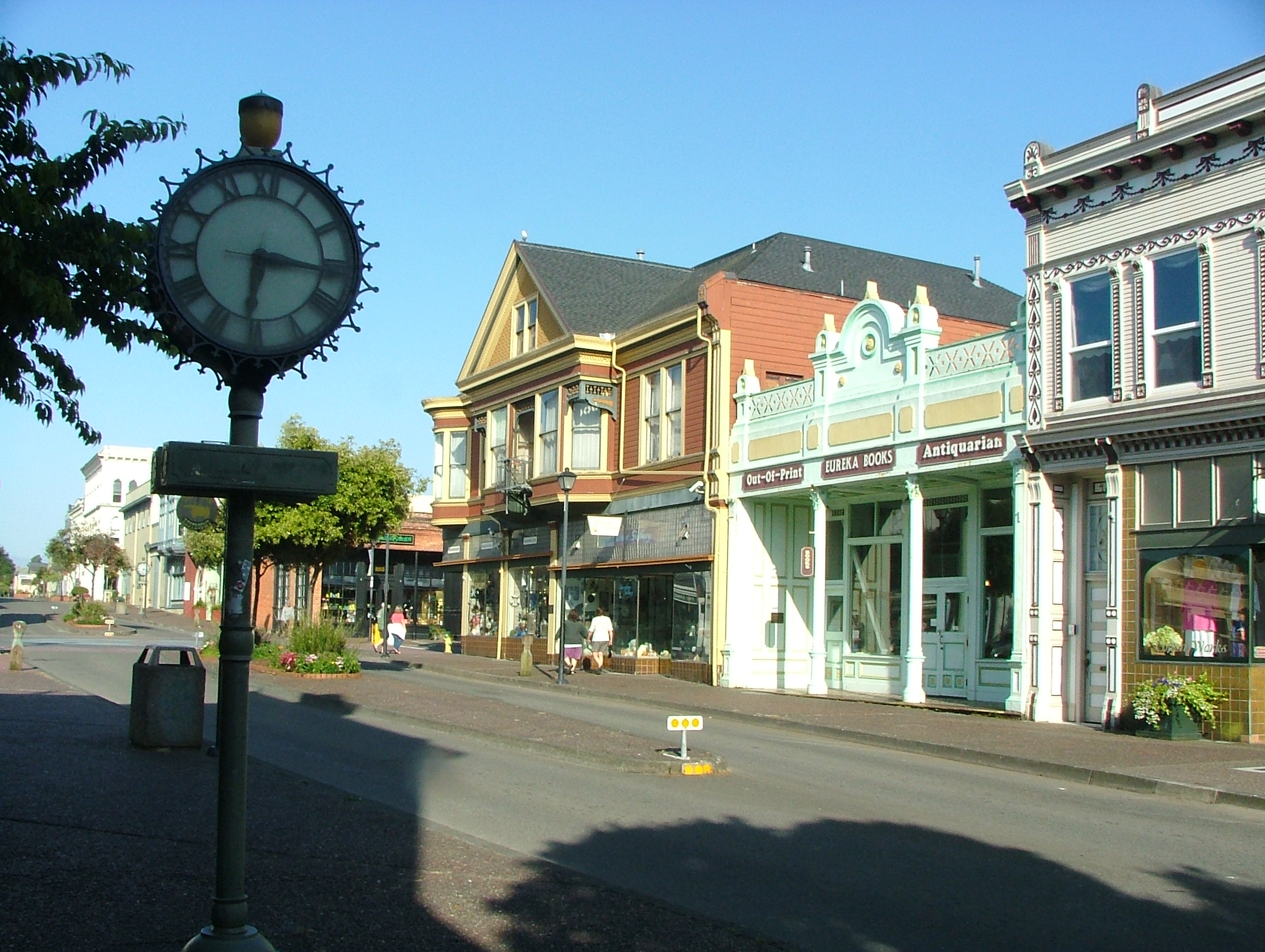
Eureka's Historic Old Town. View is to the east on 2nd Street, which was the equivalent of Main St. in the Victorian era.

=== Local government ===
The City of Eureka has a mayor-council system of governance. Primary power lies with the five council members, divided into five wards. The mayor has the power to appoint, as well as ceremonial duties, though the job includes presiding over council meetings and meeting visiting dignitaries. Official city business is administered by the Office of the City Manager. The Eureka City Council regularly meets on the 1st and 3rd Tuesdays of the month at 5:30 pm for closed session, and 6:30 pm for open session. Open sessions are open to the public.

=== State and federal government ===
Eureka is in the 2nd senatorial district, represented by Democrat Mike McGuire, and the 2nd Assembly district, represented by Democrat Chris Rogers. Federally, Eureka is in California's 2nd congressional district, represented by Democrat Jared Huffman.

== Infrastructure ==
=== Transportation ===
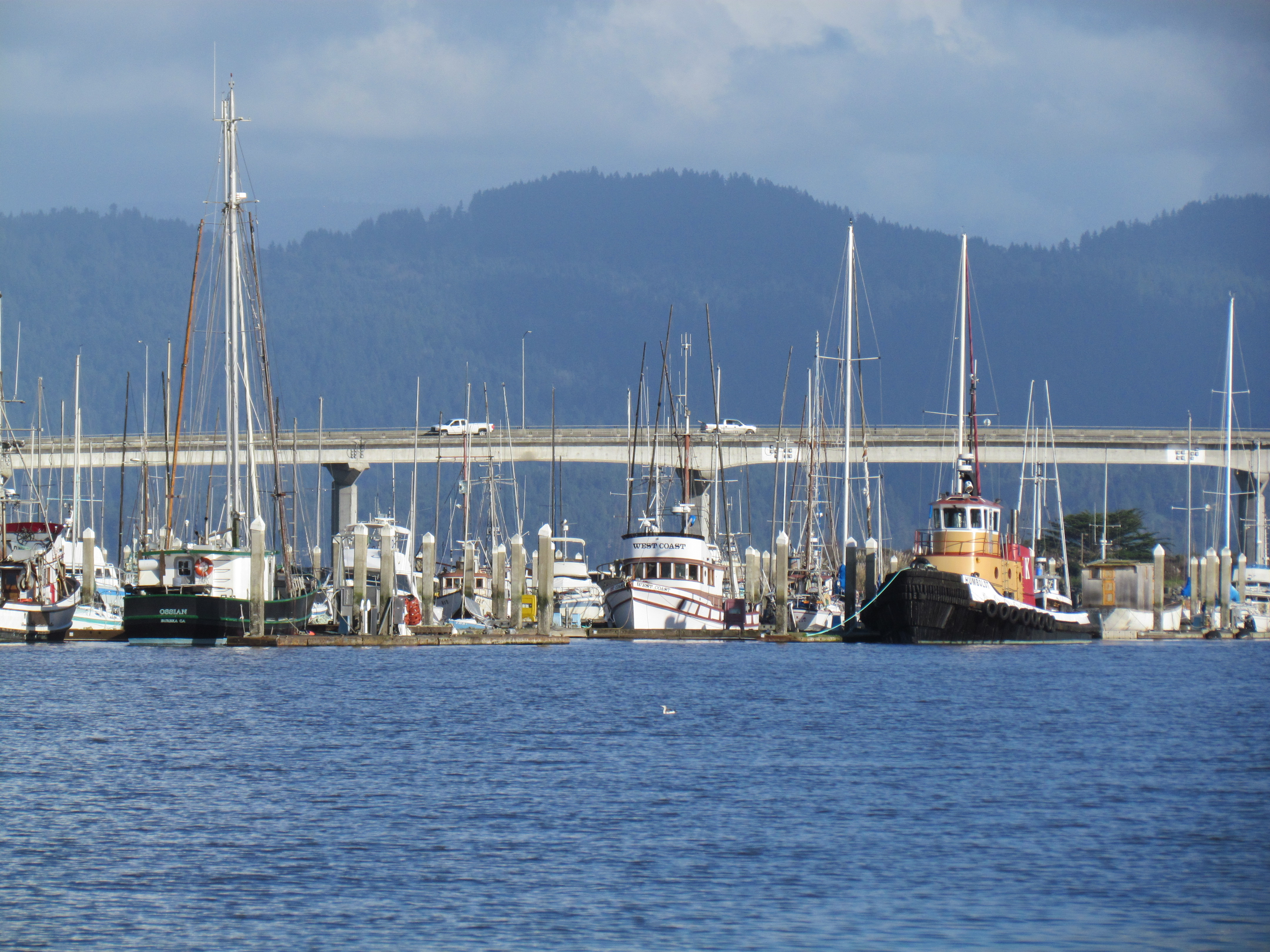
View of southernmost span of Route 255 "Samoa Bridge". Woodley Island Marina (on Humboldt Bay), Eureka, is visible in the foreground with northeasterly views of Fickle Hill (Coast Ranges) in the background.

==== Land ====
U.S. Route 101 is the major north and south highway, which connects Eureka to the rest of the North Coast region. The highway connects to Oregon, located approximately 100 miles (161 km) to the north, and San Francisco, over 250 miles (402 km) to the south. The highway follows city streets through the city, with flow and cross-traffic controlled by traffic signals. Highway 101 enters Eureka from the south as Broadway. As it reaches the downtown area, it splits into a one-way couplet composed of 4th Street and 5th Street. On the north side of the city, northbound and southbound rejoin at the northeast side before the highway becomes a restricted (safety corridor) expressway (to Arcata and points beyond) as double bridges cross the Eureka Slough (mouth of the Freshwater Creek).

State Route 255 is an alternate route of U.S. 101 between Eureka and the nearby city of Arcata, running along the western shore of Humboldt Bay. It begins in the downtown area at U.S. 101 and proceeds north along R Street towards the Samoa Bridge and the community of Samoa.

State Route 299 (formerly U.S. Route 299) connects to U.S. Route 101 at the northern end of Arcata. Route 299 begins at that point and extends easterly to serve as the major traffic artery to the east for Eureka.

==== Air ====
Eureka's full-service airport is the Arcata-Eureka Airport, located 15 miles (24 km) north in McKinleyville. This airport is primarily served by United Airlines, with Alaska Airlines and Breeze Airways starting services in 2026. The airport connects to San Francisco, Los Angeles and Denver. Murray Field and Eureka Municipal Airport are general aviation airports for private and charter air service. Both are located adjacent to Humboldt Bay. Kneeland Airport, at 2,737 feet (834 m) in elevation, is a general aviation airport that provides an option for pilots choosing to land when the prevalent marine layer is affecting airports nearer sea level.

==== Water ====
The Humboldt Bay Harbor Recreation & Conservation District manages the resources of Humboldt Bay and its environs, including the deep-water port. The port is located directly west of the city and is serviced across the bay in the community of Samoa. In addition to two deep-water channel docks for large ships, several modern small-craft marinas are available for private use, with a total capacity of more than 400 boats.

==== Bus service ====
Public bus transportation services within Eureka are managed by Humboldt Transit Authority which operates the Eureka Transit Service within Eureka and the Redwood Transit System which provides bus transportation connecting Eureka to other communities in the County. Dial-A-Ride service is available through an application process. The Humboldt Transit Authority also provides micro transit service with point-to-point bus stop service within the Humboldt Bay area through a same day app-based reservation system.

The Amtrak Thruway 7 bus provides daily connections to/from Eureka (with a curbside stop at 6th and C Streets) Martinez to the south, and Arcata to the north. Additional Amtrak connections are available from Martinez station.

Transit in Eureka is expected to be improved by the $30 million Eureka Regional Transit and Housing Center, or EaRTH Center, which was greenlighted by the Eureka City Council in mid-February 2022. The development will contain an intermodal transit center, including car share facilities and regional bus connections, in addition to 31 affordable apartments. It is slated for completion in the fall of 2027.

=== Utilities ===
==== Electricity and natural gas ====
Eureka residents are served by Pacific Gas and Electric Company. Some reserves of natural gas are located south of the city. These and other fuels help power the Humboldt Bay Power Plant (which includes the defunct Humboldt Bay Nuclear Power Plant). In 2010, the cogeneration plant increased its capacity from 130 MW to 163 MW.

==== Water ====
The City of Eureka is the largest of the local water districts supplied by the Humboldt Bay Municipal Water District. The entire region is one of the few places in California that has historically enjoyed a significant surplus of water. The reduction in major forest products manufacturing in recent decades has left the area with a 45 MGD surplus of industrial water.

=== Healthcare ===
Eureka is the regional center for healthcare. The city is served by St. Joseph Hospital, which is the largest medical acute care hospital north of the San Francisco Bay Area on the California Coast. The hospital was first opened in 1920 and was operated by the Sisters of Saint Joseph of Orange until 2016. The facility is composed of two parts: a main campus contains the acute care facility and a nearby second site, the former General Hospital Campus, which contains a rehabilitation facility and a skilled nursing site.

In November 2012, the hospital completed required earthquake safety standards upgrades. The new primary wing contains surgical suites, intensive care, 24-hour emergency care, as well as new and enlarged patient rooms for those requiring care beyond short stay or outpatient procedures, assisted living facilities, skilled nursing facilities, surgery centers, and radiology (including MRI) facilities.

In June 2016, the California Attorney General's office approved merging the St. Joseph Health system and the Providence Health and Services which includes St. Joseph's in Eureka, making it part of the third-largest non-profit health system in the nation. The merger raises local and regional concerns about health care.

== Education ==
Institutions of higher learning include the College of the Redwoods and California State Polytechnic University, Humboldt in Arcata. College of the Redwoods manages a downtown satellite campus as well.

Eureka City Schools District, the largest school district in the region, administers the public schools of the city. Eureka High School receives all students from city grammar schools as well as all those from nearby unincorporated communities. Specific schools include: Alice Birney Elementary, Grant Elementary, Lafayette Elementary, Washington Elementary, Winship Middle School, Zane Middle School, Eureka High School, Humboldt Bay High School, Zoe Barnum High School, the Eureka Adult School, the Northern United Humboldt Charter School, and Winzler Children's Center. The district offices are located in the remodeled Marshall School, which also contains the Marshall Family Resource Center, a site designed to offer programs in support of parents and families.

== Retail ==
The North Coast's primary shopping facility, the Bayshore Mall, is the largest north of the San Francisco Bay Area on the California coast. The mall features over 70 stores and opened in 1987. Other major shopping areas and centers include Henderson Center, the Eureka Mall, Burre Center, and Downtown and Old Town Eureka.

== Arts and culture ==
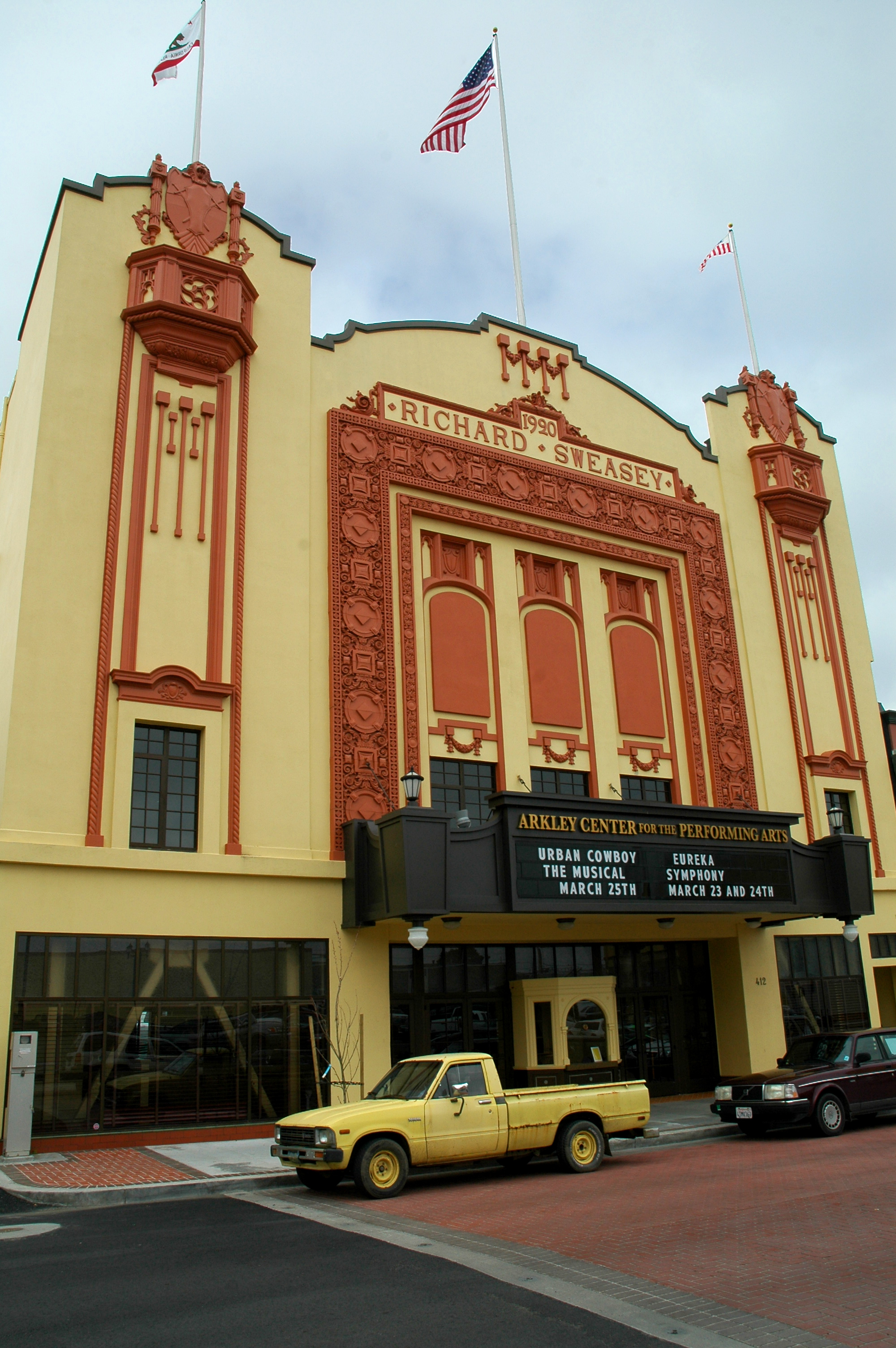
The Richard Sweasey Theater, originally built in 1920, was refurbished to an earlier era in 2007 and serves as the home of the Eureka Symphony.

Eureka is one of California's historic landmarks. The California State Historical marker, #477, designating Eureka, is located in Old Town, one of the nation's best-preserved original Victorian-era commercial districts. The city was voted as the No. 1 best small art town in John Villani's book The 100 Best Small Art Towns in America. The downtown Eureka area is also decorated with many murals.

Eureka hosts the region's largest monthly cultural and arts event, "Arts' Alive!" on the first Saturday of each month. More than 80 Eureka business and local galleries open their doors to the public. Often local cuisine and beverages accompany live performances by acclaimed regional bands and other types of performance art.

During the summer, Eureka hosts a large event series in Old Town called Friday Night Markets, which features local craftsmen, artists, food trucks, and musicians every Friday night.

Theater offerings include year-round productions from several various theater groups, including the North Coast Repertory Theater, the Redwood Curtain Theatre, and the Eureka Theater. Various events occur throughout the year at the Redwood Acres Fairgrounds.

=== Annual cultural events ===
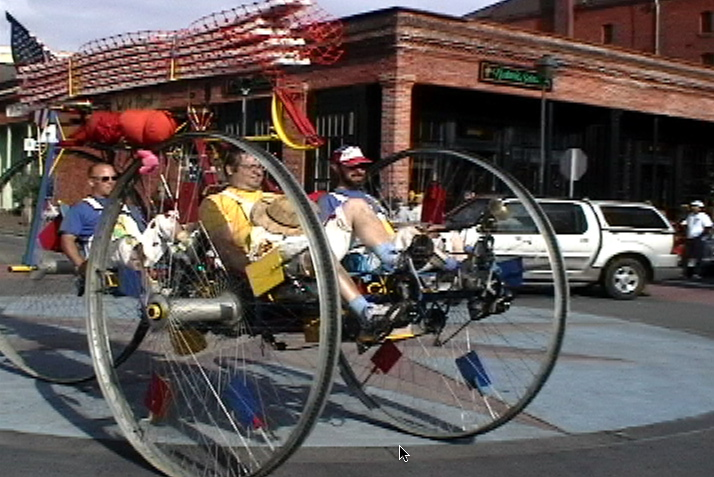
A participant team in the World Championship Kinetic Sculpture Race approaches the Old Town Eureka finish line, completing the first day of three in the internationally known event of people-powered art.

- Redwood Coast Music Festival – October
- Perilous Plunge – March
- Rhododendron Festival – April
- Kinetic sculpture race – May
- Redwood Acres Fair and Rodeo – June
- Humboldt Wood Fair – June
- Summer Concert Series on the Boardwalk – June – August
- Fourth of July Celebration – July
- Humboldt Bay Full of Blues – August 30 & 31, 2014
- Chicken Wingfest – September
- Excalibur Medieval Tournament and Market Faire – September
- Cannifest (cannabis festival) – September
- Pride Parade and Celebration – September
- Humboldt Bay Paddle Fest – September
- Craftsman's Days – November
- Christmas Truckers Parade – December

=== Museums and galleries ===
Museums include the Clarke Historical Museum, the Humboldt Bay Maritime Museum, the Morris Graves Museum of Art, HSU First Street Gallery, the Discovery Museum for Children, the Fort Humboldt State Historic Park, the Blue Ox Millworks and Historic Park and the Wiyot Tribe's Da Gou Rou Louwi' Cultural Center.

=== Architecture ===
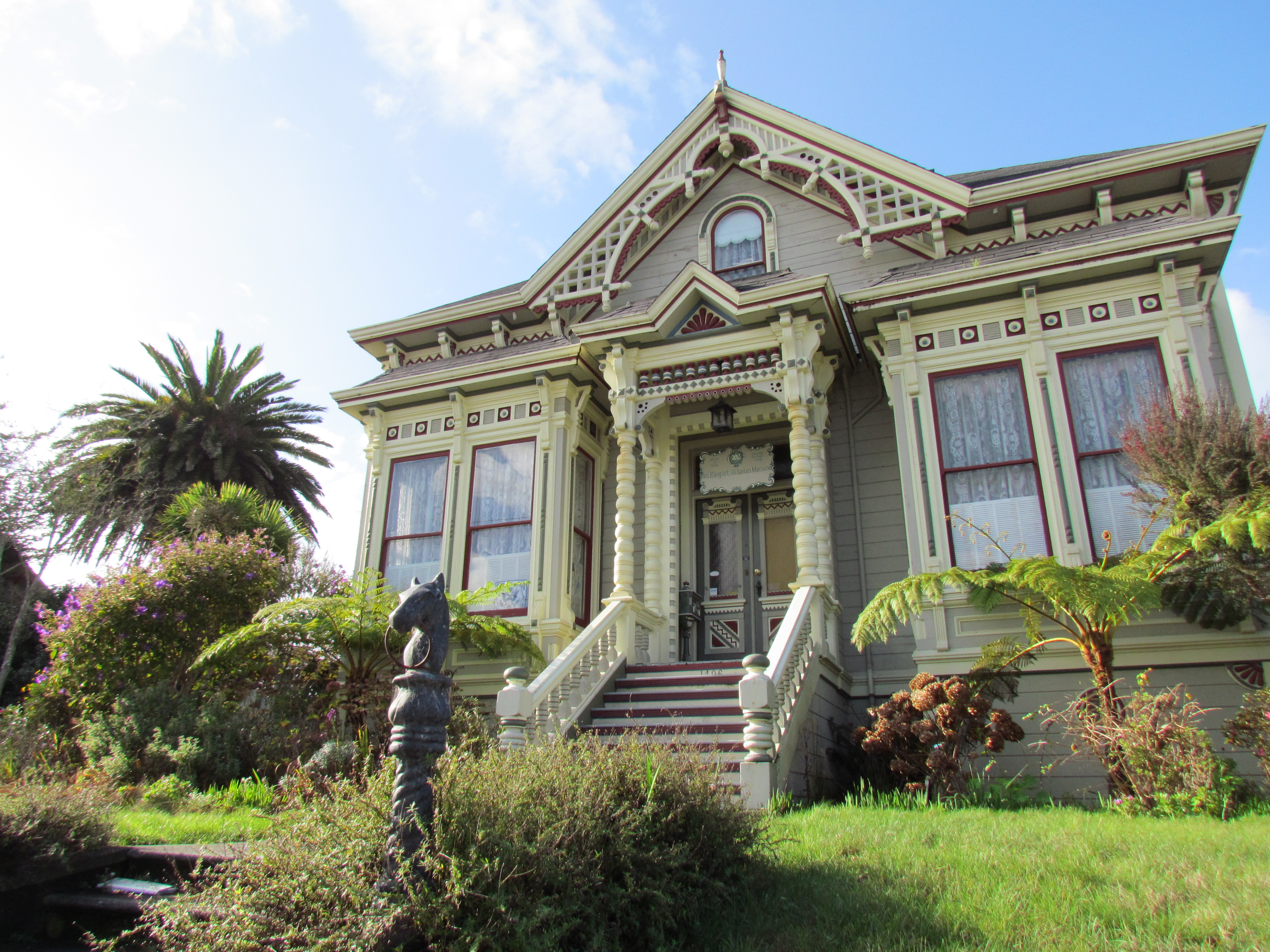
The William S. Clarke "cottage", completed in 1888, is an excellent example of a Victorian using many characteristics of Eastlake style architectural detail. The home is a National Historic Landmark.

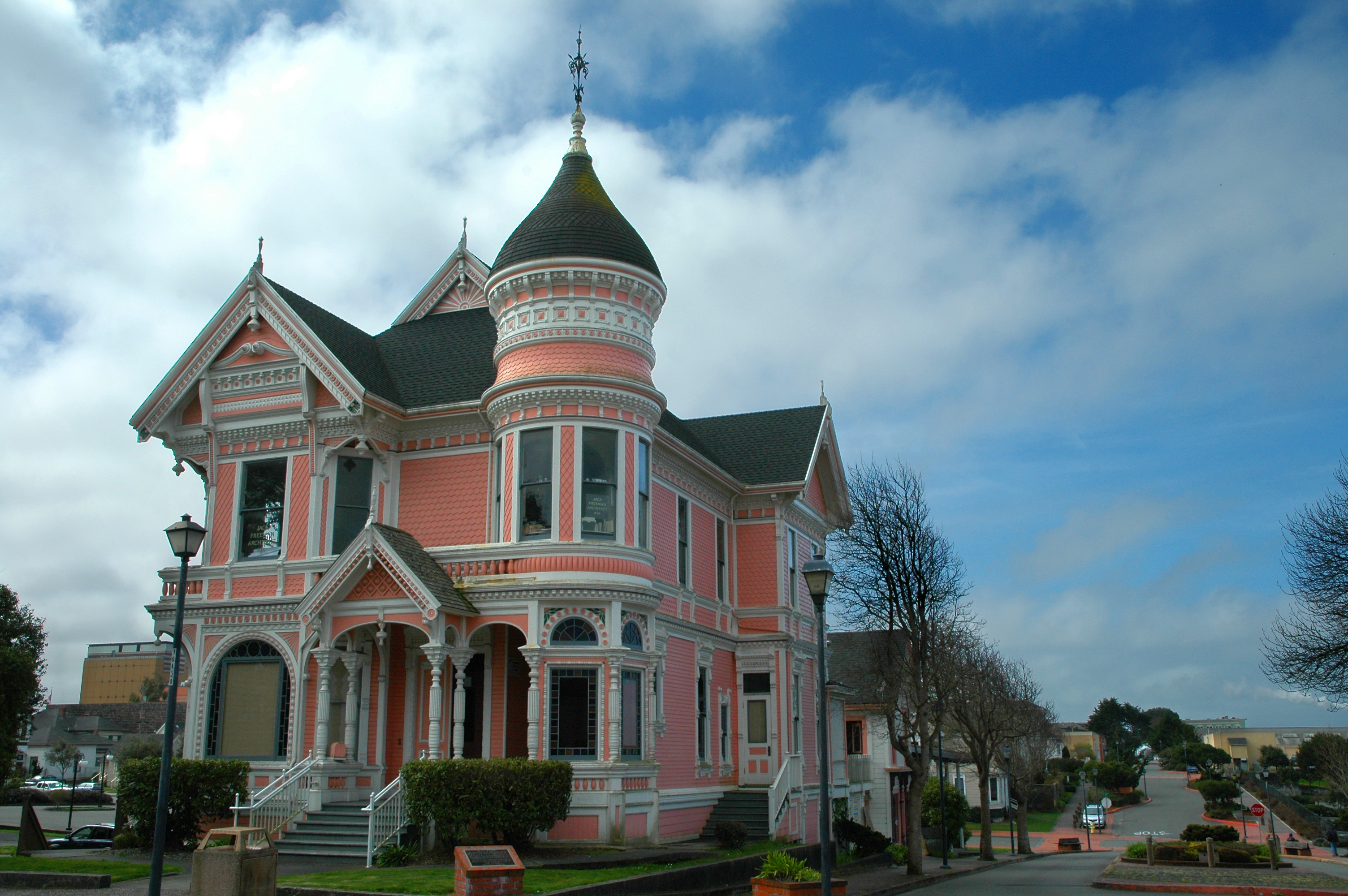
Milton Carson Home (aka the "Pink Lady"), a Queen Anne–style Victorian, completed in 1889, was a wedding gift to the eldest son of William Carson, owner of the stunning Carson Mansion located across the street.

Because of northern isolation and unfavorable economic conditions in the latter part of the twentieth century, much of the post-war redevelopment and urban renewal that other cities experienced did not occur in Eureka. As a result, Eureka has hundreds of examples of 19th- and early-20th-century architecture and historic districts.

The original Queen Anne-style Murphy home in San Francisco was completely destroyed by the fire resulting from the 1906 San Francisco earthquake. Mark Carter found the blueprints for the home in an antique store and rebuilt the structure, but in Eureka; it is now the Carter House Inn.

Approximately 16% of the city's structures are cataloged as important historical structures, with many of those attaining the status of state and national significance in terms of a particular structure's importance in relationship to the body of surviving examples of the architectural style attributed to its construction and related detail. Thirteen distinct districts have been identified which meet the criteria for the National Register of Historic Places. Among them are the 2nd Street District (10 buildings), 15th Street district (13 buildings) and the O Street district (43 buildings). Hillsdale Street, a popular and well-preserved district, contains 17 buildings of historic interest. In all, some 1,500 buildings have been recognized as qualifying for the National Register. The Eureka Heritage Society, a local architectural preservation group founded in 1973, has been instrumental in protecting and preserving many of Eureka's fine Victorians.

== Parks and recreation ==
Sequoia Park Zoo includes Eureka's largest public playground and a duck pond, in addition to gardens and examples of the area's many varieties of rhododendron bushes. Sequoia Park Zoo is situated on more than 67 acres (270,000 m^{2}) of mature second-growth redwood forest and includes a Sky Walk that allows guests view the forest from high up walkway hung between the trees. The City of Eureka Recreation Department manages 13 playgrounds, including Cooper Gulch, which is 33 acres (13 ha), as well as tennis courts, basketball courts, and soccer fields. Other parks in or near Eureka include the Humboldt Botanical Garden and the Humboldt Bay National Wildlife Refuge, and the Eureka Marsh, an accessible protected marsh between the Bayshore Mall and Humboldt Bay. There is a modern boardwalk along the city's waterfront. Located just north of Eureka's Old Town, Halvorsen Park includes a walkway along the water. The Hikshari' Trail, also known as the Eureka Waterfront Trail, provides a paved walking and bike path along the Eureka's coastline, and it is decorated with art installations.

== Media ==
Though Eureka has been the base for two major daily newspapers at different times in its 150 years, only the Times-Standard, owned by the Colorado-based Media News Group, survives. The Times-Standard printed nearly 20,000 papers per day as of 2004; as of 2018, its distribution was 13,000 and it published online-only on Mondays. Media News Group also owns a weekly classified advertiser, the Tri-City Weekly, which promotes businesses and events in Eureka, Arcata, and Fortuna. The Eureka Reporter, founded in 2003, became a daily in 2006, began publishing five days per week at the end of 2007, and permanently closed in November 2008. The Lost Coast Outpost is another local web-based news source. The North Coast Journal, a regional weekly, moved from Arcata to Eureka in 2009.

Eureka is also home to several alternative weekly publications. Senior News is a 24-page monthly newspaper distributed along a 150-mile (240 km) stretch of the Northwest California coast, published by the Humboldt Senior Resource Center since 1981. The small staff is augmented by community volunteer writers and by senior volunteers who distribute 5,000 free newspapers to more than 100 locations from Crescent City to Garberville.

Many of Humboldt County's commercial radio stations are based in Eureka: KINS-FM (106.3), KWSW (980 AM), and KEKA-FM (101.5), owned and operated by Eureka Broadcasting Co. Inc. KFMI, KRED, KJNY and KATA. Lost Coast Communications owns and operates several stations broadcasting to Eureka: KSLG-FM, KHUM, KLGE, and KWPT. Eureka also hosts KMUE, the local repeater for Redway-based community radio station KMUD. On August 26, 2006, the Blue Ox Millworks launched KKDS-LP, a low power FM station focused on youth and community issues. On November 3, 2008, a low-power part 15 AM radio station named Old Glory Radio 1650 AM went on the air. It is based in the Myrtletown neighborhood of Eureka, and it offers the area's only daily live local call-in program in the morning. KHSU, the region's local public radio station, is broadcast from Cal Poly Humboldt in Arcata. A traveler's information station owned by the State of California, KMKE-LP, operates at 98.1 MHz.

Eureka's first television station was KIEM, which signed on the air on October 25, 1953. Additional stations signed on in the years following that first telecast, beginning in 1958, including KVIQ-LD and KAEF-TV.

== Sister cities ==
- Singkawang, West Kalimantan, Indonesia
- Kamisu, Japan: official sister city of Eureka, California, since 1991. At the time the partnership began, both cities had similar size populations and bays and were both located on a major highway. Since 1991 both cities have participated in cultural exchanges. In 2019 Eureka named a park named after its sister city.

== See also ==
- Humboldt Arts Council
- Humboldt County Historical Society
