= Bayshore Mall =

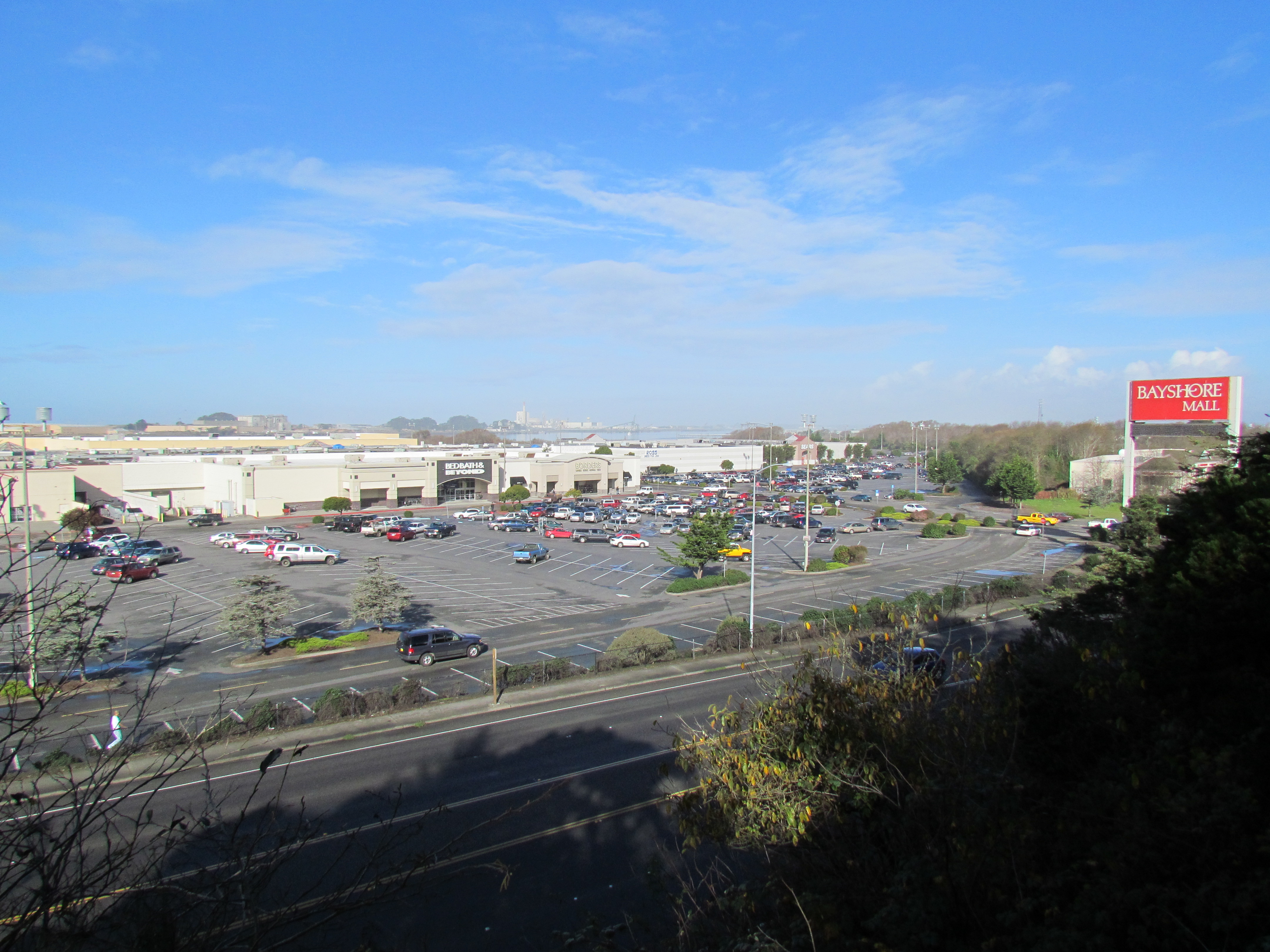
- Bayshore Mall seen from Fort Humboldt
- Location: Eureka, California, United States
- Coordinates: 40.779°N 124.190°W
- Address: 3300 Broadway
- Opened: 1987; 39 years ago
- Manager: Spinoso Real Estate Group
- Owner: Spinoso Real Estate Group
- Num. of stores: 25+
- Num. of anchor tenants: 4 (3 open, 1 vacant)
- Floor area: 730,000 sq ft (68,000 m^{2}) gross leasable area (GLA)
- Floors: 1
- Public transit: Eureka Transit Service: Red, Green, Gold, Rainbow; Redwood Transit System: Mainline, Southern Humboldt Intercity Transit
- Website: bayshoremall.com

Bayshore Mall is a small indoor shopping mall in Eureka, California, United States. It is named for its close proximity to Humboldt Bay. The large shopping facility is the only major mall located on the coast north of the San Francisco Bay Area, securing Eureka as the trading center for the entire far North Coast.

== History ==
The mall was built in 1988 as demand for shopping grew in the North Coast Region of California. The original anchors were Mervyn's on the south end, Gottschalks on the west end, JCPenney on the east end, and Sears on the north end. Longs Drugs also operated a store at the mall, which was closed (having been relocated to the PayLess store purchased by Longs at the Eureka Mall nearby) and most of that space was converted to Petco in 2004.

In the early 2000s, JCPenney downsized into an outlet store, then left the mall entirely. Bed Bath & Beyond, along with Borders, came in soon after and split the anchor space. Then, in late 2008, Mervyn's filed for Chapter 11 Bankruptcy, and in turn, closed their Eureka store in December of that year. Gottschalks closed in July 2009, after filing Chapter 11 Bankruptcy, leaving just one anchor space filled. Kohl's officially opened up their new store at the old Mervyn's location on September 27, 2009.

On January 9, 2010, a 6.5 earthquake struck off the coast of Eureka, about 27 miles out at sea, at 4:27 pm. The mall was among the buildings damaged by the quake, with loosened floor and ceiling tiles, as well as water damage from the sprinklers, but engineers found no structural damage.

Borders closed in September 2011 following bankruptcy. Following the purchase, plans to remodel the 73,000 square foot Gottschalks space were submitted to the City of Eureka by a contractor for Walmart during the summer of 2011, and opened June 12, 2012. In late summer of 2013, TJ Maxx occupied the spot vacated by Borders.

June 29, 2019 saw the return of Old Navy after leaving the mall in 2009, occupying the spot vacated by Sports Authority three years earlier. On August 31, 2019, it was announced that Sears would be closing their Bayshore Mall location a part of a plan to close 85 stores nationwide. The store closed on December 1, 2019. In January 2020, Pier 1 Imports announced it would close their Bayshore Mall location as part of a plan to close over 400 locations nationwide. Bed Bath & Beyond was shuttered in 2023 when the company filed for chapter 11 bankruptcy, resulting in the closure of the chain's remaining stores.

The mall, with over approximately 40 stores left, is the largest shopping complex for over 200 miles. Anchor stores include Kohl's and Walmart (which opened June 13, 2012). Ray's Food Place, a full-service supermarket, was located in a separate building directly south of Kohl's on the same property, but closed at the end of 2013 when parent company C&K Markets declared chapter 11 bankruptcy. It is currently occupied by Sportsman's Warehouse. The mall is served by the Eureka Transit Service and Redwood Transit Service.
