= Citybus =

Citybus or City bus may refer to:

- City bus, also known as a commuter bus, transit bus, or public bus
- Citybus (Hong Kong), a bus operator headquartered in Hong Kong
- Citibus (Lubbock), a public transit service in Lubbock, Texas
- Citibus (New Zealand), a bus and coach company in New Zealand
- Citibus Tours, a bus company that operated in Greater Manchester, England
- Capital Citybus, a former London bus operator by Citybus Hong Kong
- Davenport Citibus, public transit in Davenport, Iowa
- Indore City Bus, a road transport system run by Indore City Transport Services Limited in India
- Plymouth Citybus, a bus operator in the city of Plymouth
- Southampton Citybus, a former bus company in Southampton, England
- Irisbus Agora also known as Irisbus Citybus
