= Eureka Transit Service =

- Founded: 20 January 1976
- Headquarters: 133 V Street, Eureka CA
- Locale: Eureka, CA
- Service type: Bus
- Routes: 5
- Stops: ~100
- Fleet: 10
- Fuel type: Diesel, Diesel-electric hybrid
- Operator: Humboldt Transit Authority
- Website: https://hta.org/agencies/eureka-transit-service/

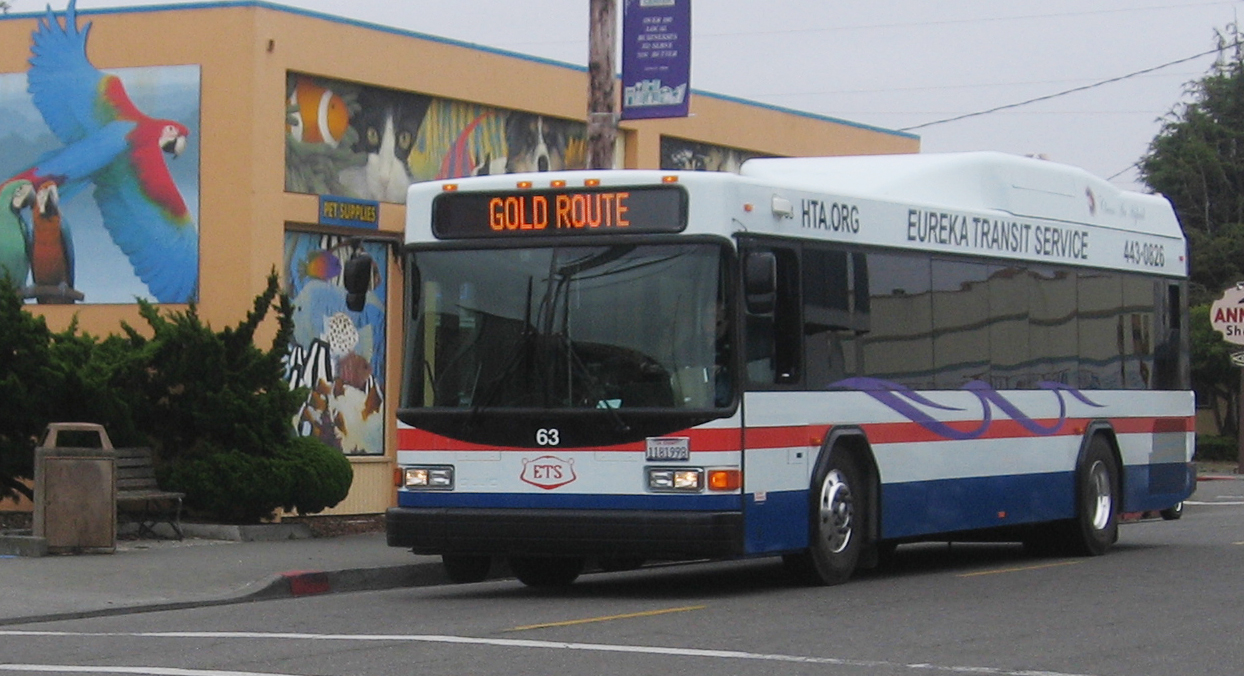
An ETS hybrid bus on the Gold Route in Henderson Center

The Eureka Transit Service is the city fixed-route bus system in Eureka, California. ETS operates four weekday routes between downtown Eureka, Bayshore Mall, Henderson Center, Myrtletown, Cutten, and Pine Hill. Three routes operate on Saturdays. Bus service in Eureka is provided under contract by the Humboldt Transit Authority.

== History & Predecessors ==
=== Electric streetcar operations ===
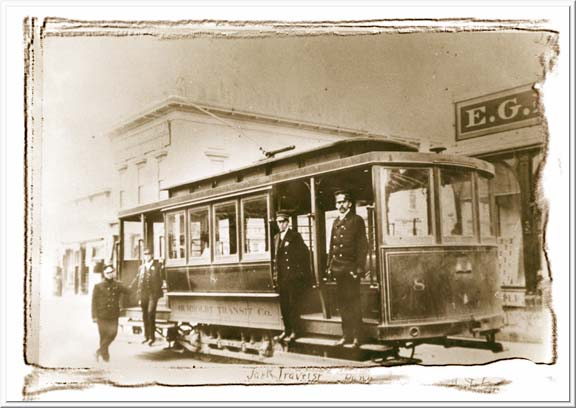
A Humboldt Transit Company streetcar in downtown Eureka

Fixed route public transportation in Eureka began in 1903, when the Humboldt Transit Company initiated electric streetcar service between downtown, Myrtle Avenue, Sequoia Park, and J Street. San Francisco and Sacramento were where Eureka's trolley cars were purchased from. By 1940, however, the streetcar system was no longer profitable and was canceled in favor of motorized public transit. On the last day of service, some Eureka residents burned a Humboldt Transit railcar in the streets, utterly destroying it. The newly formed Eureka Transit Lines provided motorized transit service for the next several decades, but this system was never as comprehensive or well-ridden as the streetcar lines.

=== Bishop's Transit Service ===
On April 10, 1972, the city council transferred the operation of Eureka's jitney service to Bishop's Transit Service, a private company owned by Glen and Lloyd Bishop. In conjunction with the formation of the Humboldt Transit Authority, the city of Eureka assumed control of the bus system on January 20, 1976, and offered a week of free rides to promote the system. It also contracted Young Ideas Advertising and Sales Promotion to create an advertising campaign, logo, and new name for the new system. It was still operated by Bishop, however. Under this arrangement, the city subsidized operation and required Bishop to secure the city council's approval before changing routes or fares. In the mid-1970s, Bishop was operating two city bus routes with two Chevrolet Step Vans built in 1968 and 1973. By 1979, the city owned five transit vehicles and was operating three routes (see map). The fare was $0.25 with free transfer. On February 1, 1985, the city of Eureka began operating ETS independently, no longer contracting operations to Bishop. Over the next five years, the city purchased its first heavy-duty transit buses, 30' Gillig Phantoms, and revised the vans' original yellow and red design to yellow, orange, and brown on the new buses.

=== Route restructuring ===
The ETS route system has undergone several major revisions since the city took over operations in 1985. In 1993, the city contracted J. Kaplan & Associates of Walnut Creek, CA, to restructure and market ETS, resulting in a four-route system. Three years later, the new Purple Route brought the route total to five, with three buses operating on Saturdays. Routes were again restructured in 1998 and the Rainbow Route was introduced as one of only two Saturday buses. In 2003, Bayshore Mall replaced Henderson Center as the main non-downtown transfer point, resulting in substantial route changes. However, this geographically removed transfer point significantly increased trip times, and in 2005 it was switched back to the more central Henderson Center in a major revision that eliminated the Blue Route and increased overall speed thanks to shortened trips.

== Routes ==
=== Red Route ===
Along with the Green Route, the Red Route is one of the original ETS routes, though it has changed considerably over the years. It currently services downtown Eureka, Broadway, Bayshore Mall, Henderson Center, Cutten, and Sequoia Park. It starts service at 6:28 AM and ends at 7:00 PM.

=== Green Route ===
At one time, the Green Route served as a shuttle between downtown Eureka and Henderson Center. It has since expanded to service Bayshore Mall, Silvercrest, St. Joseph and General hospitals, and Myrtletown as well. The Green Route begins at 6:52 AM and ends at 6:44 PM.

=== Gold Route ===
Although newer than the Red and Green Routes, the Gold Route is perhaps the most stable. Despite revisions to the other routes, the Gold Route has consistently serviced downtown Eureka, Pine Hill, Bayshore Mall, and Henderson Center. It runs from 6:15 AM to 7:00 PM on weekdays, and 10 AM to 5 PM on Saturdays.

=== Purple Route ===
The Purple Route services downtown Eureka, Target, Silvercrest, General Hospital, Henderson Center, and Burre Center. It runs from 6:39 AM to 7:00 PM on weekdays, and 10 AM to 5 PM on Saturdays.

=== Rainbow Route ===
The Rainbow Route, so named because it incorporates specific sections of weekday routes, runs only on Saturdays. It services downtown Eureka, Broadway, Bayshore Mall, Henderson Center, Sequoia Park, St. Joseph and General hospitals, and Myrtletown. It runs from 10 AM to 5 PM.

== Fares and Passes ==
	Regular	Youth (3-17) Senior (62+) Disabled
Cash Fare	$1.70	$1.30
Multi-ride Rate (regional transit pass)	$1.40	$0.95
Day Pass	$3.95	$3.00
Month Pass	$48.00	$41.00

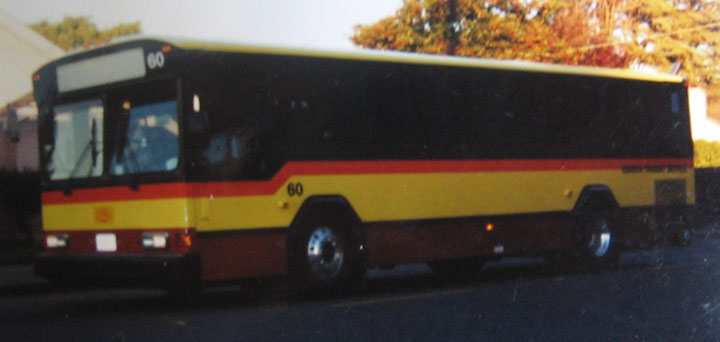
Bus 60 in 1999, in ETS's second-generation colors

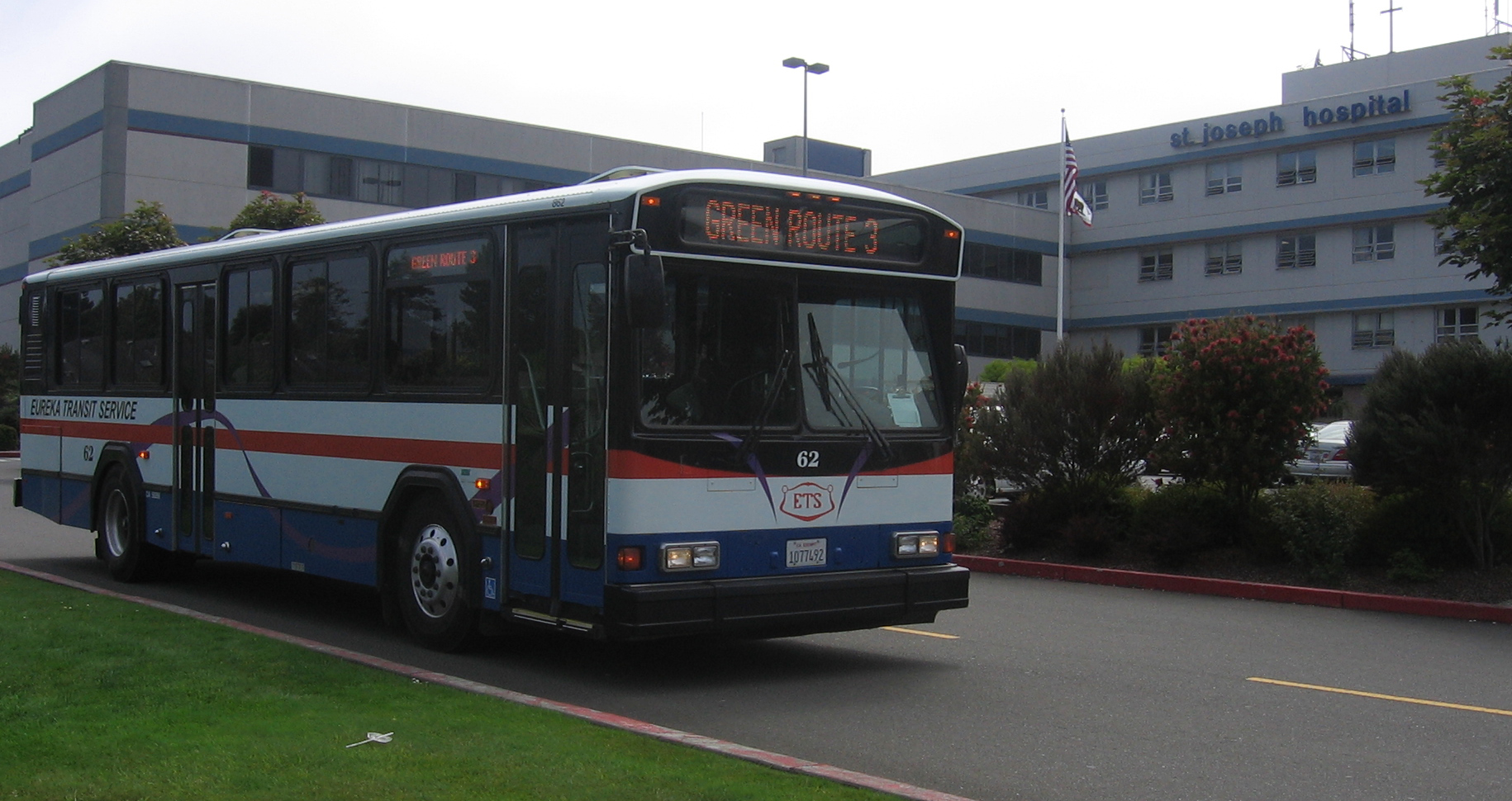
Bus 62 in the current ETS colors in 2007

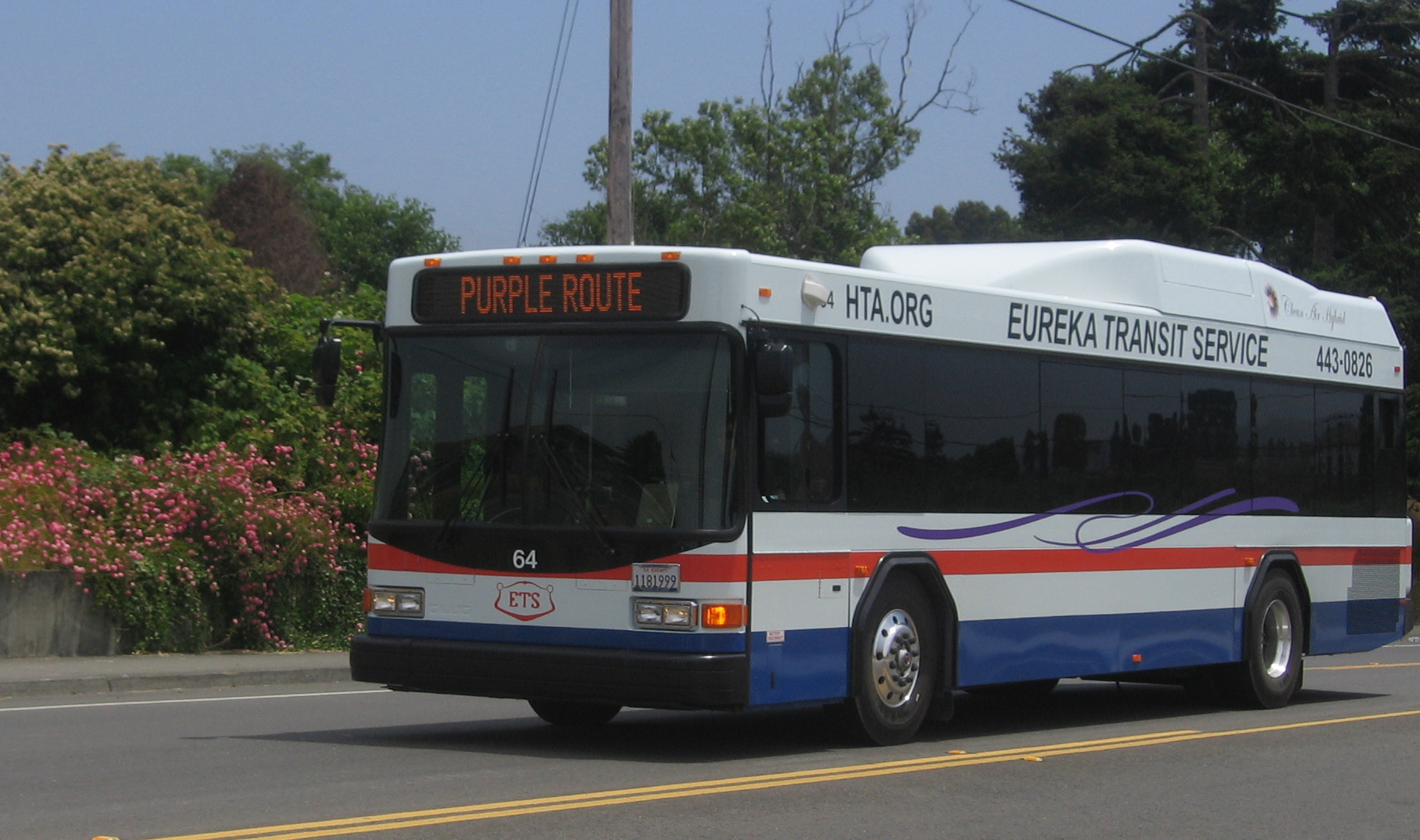
Hybrid bus 64 in 2007

Free one-way transfers are included in the fare. ETS offers a regional transit pass jointly with Redwood Transit and the Arcata and Mad River Transit System in $10 and $20 values. Day and month passes are also available.

=== Jack Pass ===
The Jack Pass program, initiated in the fall of 2007, allows Humboldt State University students to ride Eureka Transit, Redwood Transit, and Arcata and Mad River Transit free with a student ID with current registration sticker.

== Fleet ==
ETS operates an all-Gillig fleet, with Phantoms from 2002 to 2003 (as of 2010, operating only on Saturdays), hybrid Low Floors from 2007, and diesel Low Floors from 2009. In 1998 the city council designated one bus as a Visitors' Bus that would promote tourism with a bus wrap featuring local attractions; this bus has since been retired. Since 2002, buses have been ordered in ETS's new red, white, and blue livery, each with a distinct swooping purple design, and all other buses were repainted from their original colors. In 2007, HTA joined a consortium of eleven transit agencies to purchase five diesel-electric hybrid buses from Gillig Corporation; two of these are Eureka Transit buses. The hybrids were also Humboldt County's first low-floor buses.

Year	Unit	Make/Model	Engine	Retired	Notes
1986	35	30' Gillig Phantom 96"	Detroit Diesel 6V92	2004	Visitors' Bus 1998-2004
1987	36	30' Gillig Phantom 96"	Detroit Diesel 6V92	2007	
1988	37-38	30' Gillig Phantom 96"	Detroit Diesel 6V92	2004(38); 2008(37)	
1989	33-34	30' Gillig Phantom 96"	Detroit Diesel 6V92	2006(34); 2009(33)	
1993	32	30' Gillig Phantom 96"	Detroit Diesel 6V92	2009	
1999	60	35' Gillig Phantom 102"	Detroit Diesel Series 50	2009	
2002	62	35' Gillig Phantom 102"	Cummins ISM	2015	--
2003	61	35' Gillig Phantom 102"	Cummins ISM	2015	--
2007	63-64	35' Gillig Hybrid Low Floor	Cummins ISL	--	--
2009	65-67	35' Gillig Low Floor	Cummins ISL	--	--
2014	68-69	35' Gillig Low Floor	Cummins ISL9	--	--
