= Willow Creek Intercity =

- Parent: Humboldt Transit Authority
- Headquarters: 133 V Street, Eureka, CA 95501
- Locale: Humboldt County, CA
- Routes: 1
- Stops: 4
- Destinations: Arcata Transit Center, Willow Creek, CA, Blue Lake City Hall
- Website: https://hta.org/agencies/willow-creek/
Willow Creek Intercity Transit Map
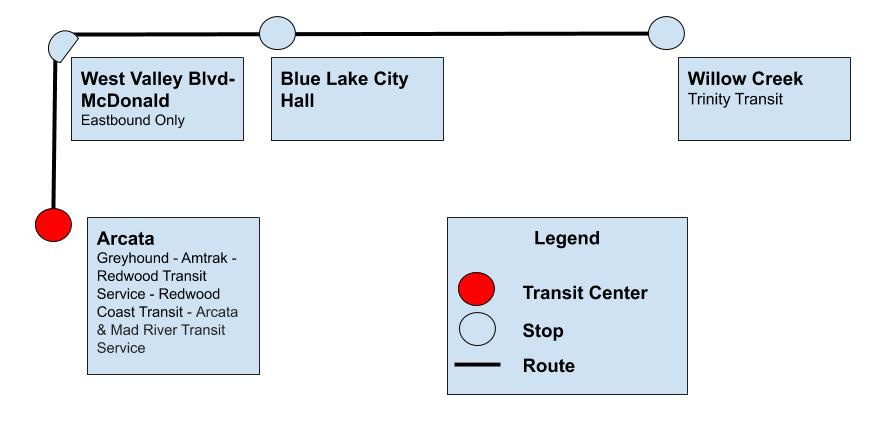

Willow Creek Intercity is a transit system in the United States that provides commute trips between Willow Creek and Arcata, California, during weekdays and Saturdays. The service is operated by the Redwood Transit System and is overseen by Humboldt Transit Authority. The service provides a connection to Trinity Transit and KTNET in Willow Creek.

The route has undergone several changes. As of October 16th, 2023, the Willow Creek Intercity route expanded to provide trips to Blue Lake. As of March 3rd, 2025, the routes name was officially changed to North State Express 299, as part of a wider effort by the Humboldt Transit Authority to coordinate intercity transit with other transit authorities. On December 5th, 2025, the schedule was changed slightly.
