= Blue Lake Rancheria Transit System =

Transit system

- Founded: January 1, 2002
- Defunct: October 2023
- Headquarters: 428 CHARTIN ROAD BLUE LAKE, CA 95525
- Locale: Humboldt County
- Routes: 1
- Hubs: Arcata Transit Center

Blue Lake Rancheria Transit System was a tribal run, one route, transit system in Humboldt County, California . It provided service weekdays only between the Arcata Transit Center and Blue Lake Rancheria. The Blue Lake Rancheria Transit System ceased operations in October 2023, with the Willow Creek Intercity being adjusted to make stops in Blue Lake Rancheria.

== Fares ==
One way fares as of 2020 were $1.65 for adults, $0.75 for youth 7–12 years old, and $0.25 for children 4–6 years old. Blue Lake also offered 10 and 20 ride passes that provided a 10% and 32% discount respectively.
