= Willow Creek, California =

Willow Creek, California formerly China Flat
- Census-designated place
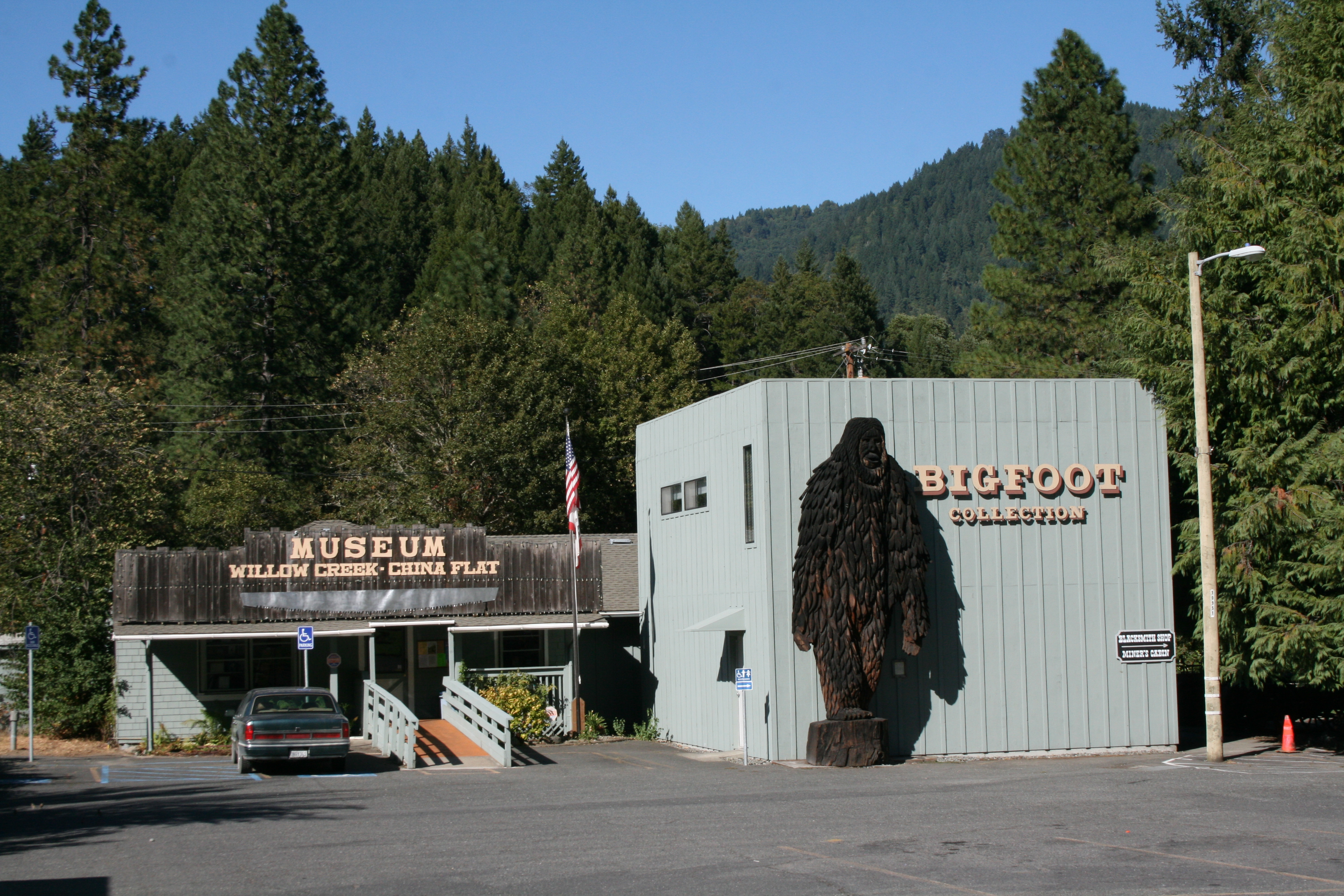
- The "Bigfoot Museum" in Willow Creek

- Location in Humboldt County and the state of California
- Coordinates: 40°56′22″N 123°37′53″W
- Country: United States
- State: California
- County: Humboldt

Area
  - Total: 30.609 sq mi (79.278 km^{2})
  - Land: 30.309 sq mi (78.501 km^{2})
  - Water: 0.300 sq mi (0.777 km^{2}) 0.98%
- Elevation: 610 ft (186 m)

Population (2020)
  - Total: 1,720
  - Density: 56.7/sq mi (21.9/km^{2})
- Demonym: Willow Creeker
- Time zone: UTC−8 (Pacific (PST))
  - Summer (DST): UTC−7 (PDT)
- ZIP Code: 95573
- Area codes: 530, 837
- FIPS code: 06-85642
- GNIS feature ID: 1660182

Willow Creek (formerly China Flat) is a census-designated place (CDP) in Humboldt County, California, United States. The population was 1,720 at the 2020 census, up from 1,710 at the 2010 census. The town is located around 30 miles (48 km) from county seat and harbor city Eureka.

Willow Creek sits along the Trinity River. Willow Creek is described as a "rugged mountain community nestled in the heart of the Six Rivers National Forest." This area of California is located in the Trinity/Shasta/Cascade Region, near the Oregon border, and is easily reached via State Routes 299 and 96 (the "Bigfoot Scenic Byway").

The town is approximately 50 miles (80 km) south of where the Patterson-Gimlin film was made. Willow Creek calls itself the Bigfoot capital of the world, has a Bigfoot Museum and holds an annual "Bigfoot Daze" festival in September in honor of the cryptid, followed by various festivities in a local park. The roadhead of the Bluff Creek / Fish Lake Road, near which many alleged Bigfoot sightings and footprint finds occurred, is about 50 miles (80 km) north, along Route 96.

Willow Creek transit is served by the Redwood Transit System, through the Willow Creek Intercity route. It is also served by Trinity Transit Authority.

== History ==
The indigenous people from here are part of the Tsnungwe or South Fork Hupa and are speakers of the Hupa Language. Willow Creek's first non-indigenous settlers were Chinese laborers from the mining and lumber camps, which earned the town the name China Flat. The China Flat post office opened in 1878, and changed its name to Willow Creek in 1915.

== Geography ==
According to the United States Census Bureau, the CDP has a total area of 30.6 square miles (79 km^{2}), which includes 30.3 square miles (78 km^{2}) of land and 0.3 square miles (0.78 km^{2}) of water.

The CDP in 2000, according to the United States Census Bureau, was larger with a total area of 204.5 square miles (530 km^{2}), which included 204.4 square miles (529 km^{2}) of land and 0.2 square miles (0.52 km^{2}) of water.

=== Climate ===
This region experiences much warmer summers than locations near the coast, such as county seat Eureka, but retains high winter rainfall associated with coastal locations. Daytime highs in summer represent areas with hot-summer-Mediterranean climates but are moderated by cool nights, causing high diurnal temperature variation. On climate maps, Willow Creek has a hot-summer Mediterranean climate (Csa). Summer highs are extremely hot compared to areas of the county affected by coastal fog. At the same time, winters are considerably colder, with light snowfall not unusual a few times per season.

Climate data for Willow Creek, 1981–2010 normals, extremes 1968–2023
Month	Jan	Feb	Mar	Apr	May	Jun	Jul	Aug	Sep	Oct	Nov	Dec	Year
Record high °F (°C)	70 (21)	76 (24)	85 (29)	96 (36)	105 (41)	112 (44)	119 (48)	115 (46)	108 (42)	99 (37)	80 (27)	65 (18)	119 (48)
Mean maximum °F (°C)	59.6 (15.3)	67.1 (19.5)	76.6 (24.8)	86.1 (30.1)	93.7 (34.3)	100.1 (37.8)	105.6 (40.9)	105.0 (40.6)	99.9 (37.7)	86.2 (30.1)	69.3 (20.7)	58.8 (14.9)	107.8 (42.1)
Mean daily maximum °F (°C)	53.5 (11.9)	57.0 (13.9)	63.0 (17.2)	69.9 (21.1)	77.6 (25.3)	86.2 (30.1)	95.2 (35.1)	94.5 (34.7)	87.9 (31.1)	74.6 (23.7)	58.8 (14.9)	50.4 (10.2)	72.4 (22.4)
Daily mean °F (°C)	44.3 (6.8)	46.3 (7.9)	50.4 (10.2)	55.1 (12.8)	60.9 (16.1)	67.6 (19.8)	74.0 (23.3)	73.3 (22.9)	67.7 (19.8)	58.5 (14.7)	49.1 (9.5)	43.3 (6.3)	57.5 (14.2)
Mean daily minimum °F (°C)	35.0 (1.7)	35.5 (1.9)	37.8 (3.2)	40.3 (4.6)	44.1 (6.7)	49.0 (9.4)	52.7 (11.5)	52.0 (11.1)	47.4 (8.6)	42.4 (5.8)	39.3 (4.1)	36.1 (2.3)	42.6 (5.9)
Mean minimum °F (°C)	29.0 (−1.7)	28.9 (−1.7)	31.1 (−0.5)	33.2 (0.7)	37.2 (2.9)	41.5 (5.3)	46.6 (8.1)	46.3 (7.9)	42.2 (5.7)	34.1 (1.2)	31.0 (−0.6)	28.3 (−2.1)	24.6 (−4.1)
Record low °F (°C)	17 (−8)	13 (−11)	22 (−6)	24 (−4)	27 (−3)	29 (−2)	34 (1)	39 (4)	32 (0)	22 (−6)	19 (−7)	5 (−15)	5 (−15)
Average precipitation inches (mm)	10.16 (258)	7.75 (197)	7.02 (178)	3.81 (97)	2.50 (64)	0.94 (24)	0.22 (5.6)	0.31 (7.9)	0.69 (18)	2.86 (73)	7.46 (189)	11.76 (299)	55.48 (1,410.5)
Source 1: NOAA
Source 2: National Weather Service (mean maxima/minima 1991–2020)

== Demographics ==
Historical population
Census	Pop.	Note	%±
1990	1,576		—
2000	1,743		10.6%
2010	1,710		−1.9%
2020	1,720		0.6%
U.S. Decennial Census; 1860–1870 1880-1890; 1900 1910 1920; 1930 1940 1950; 1960 1970 1980; 1990 2000 2010; 2020

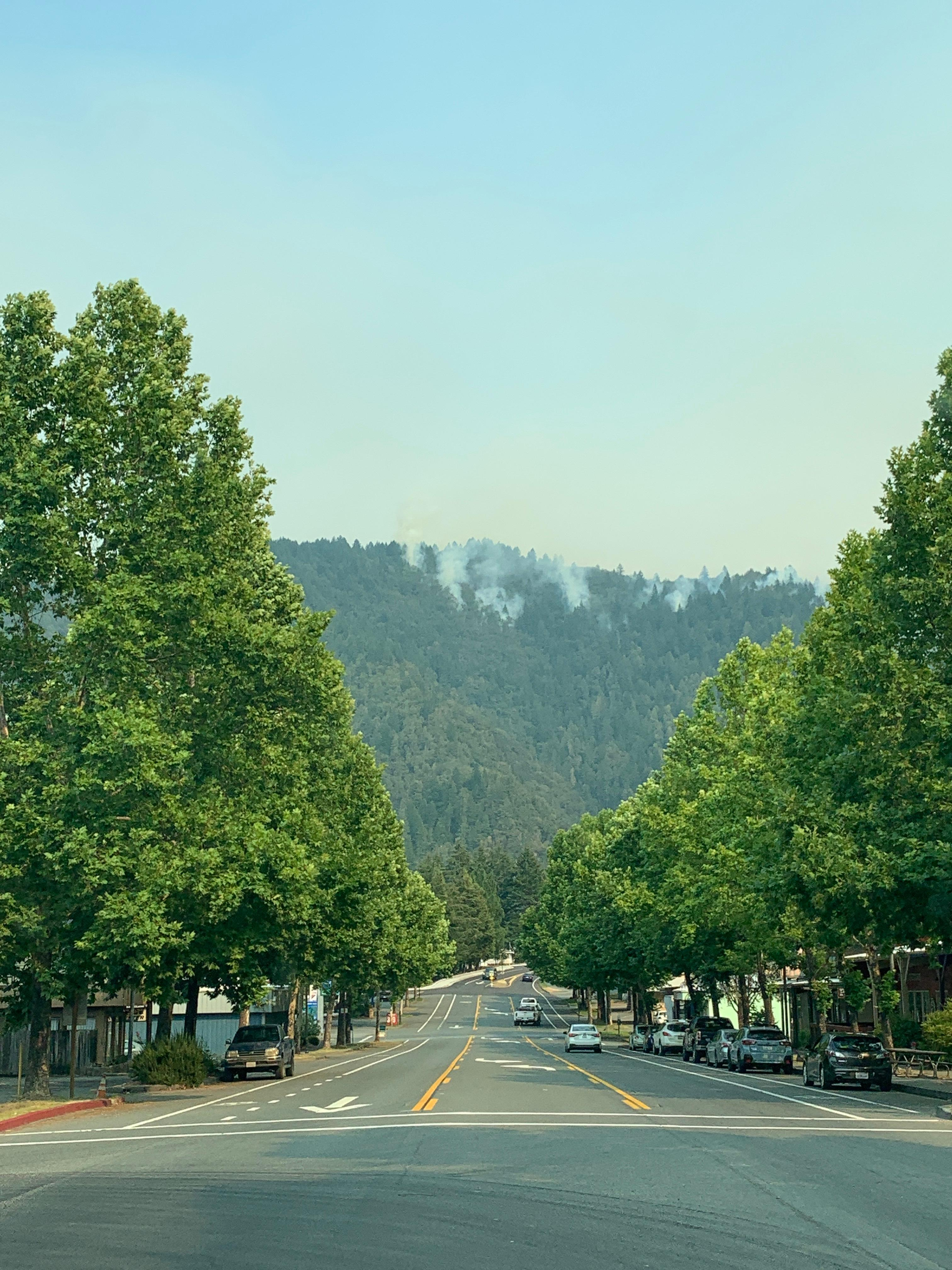
Downtown Willow Creek in 2022.

Willow Creek first appeared as a census designated place in the 1990 U.S. census.

=== Racial and ethnic composition ===
Willow Creek, CDP, California – Racial and ethnic composition Note: the US Census treats Hispanic/Latino as an ethnic category. This table excludes Latinos from the racial categories and assigns them to a separate category. Hispanics/Latinos may be of any race.
Race / Ethnicity (NH = Non-Hispanic)	Pop 2000	Pop 2010	Pop 2020	% 2000	% 2010	% 2020
White alone (NH)	1,372	1,324	1,175	78.71%	77.43%	68.31%
Black or African American alone (NH)	9	6	10	0.52%	0.35%	0.58%
Native American or Alaska Native alone (NH)	159	158	170	9.12%	9.24%	9.88%
Asian alone (NH)	10	14	19	0.57%	0.82%	1.10%
Native Hawaiian or Pacific Islander alone (NH)	5	6	4	0.29%	0.35%	0.23%
Other race alone (NH)	2	0	22	0.11%	0.00%	1.28%
Mixed race or Multiracial (NH)	89	94	173	5.11%	5.50%	10.06%
Hispanic or Latino (any race)	97	108	147	5.57%	6.32%	8.55%
Total	1,743	1,710	1,720	100.00%	100.00%	100.00%

=== 2020 census ===
As of the 2020 census, Willow Creek had a population of 1,720, all of whom lived in households. The population density was 56.7 inhabitants per square mile (21.9/km^{2}).

The age distribution was 347 people (20.2%) under the age of 18, 72 people (4.2%) aged 18 to 24, 391 people (22.7%) aged 25 to 44, 458 people (26.6%) aged 45 to 64, and 452 people (26.3%) who were 65 years of age or older. The median age was 47.5 years. For every 100 females, there were 110.3 males, and for every 100 females age 18 and over, there were 108.0 males.

0.0% of residents lived in urban areas, while 100.0% lived in rural areas.

There were 776 households, out of which 168 (21.6%) had children under the age of 18 living in them. Of all households, 308 (39.7%) were married-couple households, 83 (10.7%) were cohabiting couple households, 194 (25.0%) had a female householder with no partner present, and 191 (24.6%) had a male householder with no partner present. 276 households (35.6%) were one person, and 115 (14.8%) were one person aged 65 or older. The average household size was 2.22. There were 434 families (55.9% of all households).

There were 984 housing units at an average density of 32.5 units per square mile (12.5 units/km^{2}), of which 776 (78.9%) were occupied. Of these, 511 (65.9%) were owner-occupied, and 265 (34.1%) were occupied by renters. 21.1% of housing units were vacant. The homeowner vacancy rate was 3.2%, and the rental vacancy rate was 4.7%.

=== Income and poverty ===
In 2023, the US Census Bureau estimated that the median household income was $43,056, and the per capita income was $29,595.

=== 2010 census ===
The 2010 United States census reported that Willow Creek had a population of 1,710. The population density was 55.9 inhabitants per square mile (21.6/km^{2}). The racial makeup of Willow Creek was 1,375 (80.4%) White, 6 (0.4%) African American, 167 (9.8%) Native American, 14 (0.8%) Asian, 6 (0.4%) Pacific Islander, 29 (1.7%) from other races, and 113 (6.6%) from two or more races. Hispanic or Latino of any race were 108 persons (6.3%).

The Census reported that 1,699 people (99.4% of the population) lived in households, 11 (0.6%) lived in non-institutionalized group quarters, and 0 (0%) were institutionalized.

There were 812 households, out of which 161 (19.8%) had children under the age of 18 living in them, 353 (43.5%) were opposite-sex married couples living together, 63 (7.8%) had a female householder with no husband present, 32 (3.9%) had a male householder with no wife present. There were 75 (9.2%) unmarried opposite-sex partnerships, and 7 (0.9%) same-sex married couples or partnerships; 283 households (34.9%) were made up of individuals, and 94 (11.6%) had someone living alone who was 65 years of age or older. The average household size was 2.09. There were 448 families (55.2% of all households); the average family size was 2.65.

The population was spread out, with 287 people (16.8%) under the age of 18, 100 people (5.8%) aged 18 to 24, 366 people (21.4%) aged 25 to 44, 642 people (37.5%) aged 45 to 64, and 315 people (18.4%) who were 65 years of age or older. The median age was 49.5 years. For every 100 females, there were 101.4 males. For every 100 females age 18 and over, there were 102.1 males.

There were 1,108 housing units at an average density of 36.2 units per square mile (14.0 units/km^{2}), of which 812 were occupied, of which 525 (64.7%) were owner-occupied, and 287 (35.3%) were occupied by renters. The homeowner vacancy rate was 1.7%; the rental vacancy rate was 5.2%. 1,087 people (63.6% of the population) lived in owner-occupied housing units and 612 people (35.8%) lived in rental housing units.

== Government ==
=== Politics ===
In the state legislature, Willow Creek is in the 2nd senatorial district, represented by Democrat Mike McGuire, and the 2nd Assembly district, represented by Democrat Chris Rogers.

Federally, Willow Creek is in California's 2nd congressional district, represented by Democrat Jared Huffman.

== Media ==
Willow Creek was served for many decades by the weekly Klamity Kourier newspaper, which closed in 2006 and was quickly replaced by the Bigfoot Valley News. The Bigfoot Valley News has since closed, but the regional newspaper, Two Rivers Tribune (www.tworiverstribune.com), opened in 1994 and continued to operate as of 2026.
