= Arcata and Mad River Transit System =

Bus service in Arcata, California

- Parent: City of Arcata
- Headquarters: 925 E Street
- Locale: Arcata, California
- Service type: bus service
- Routes: 4
- Operator: Humboldt Transit Authority
- Website: https://hta.org/agencies/arcata-and-mad-river/

Arcata and Mad River Transit System (A&MRTS) is a fixed-route bus service for Arcata, California. The service is funded by California State Polytechnic University, Humboldt (Cal Poly Humboldt) and offers free rides to students. Because of this relationship, Arcata has relatively reliable transit service for a city its size.

== History ==
In 1974, the City Council of Arcata chose to use its allotment of SB 325 money for a public mass transit system. In April 1975, the new bus service within Arcata city limits was inaugurated and named the Arcata & Mad River Transit System.

In 2023, the City of Arcata expanded its contract with Humboldt Transit Authority to include all operation and maintenance services. In July 2025, the City Council of Arcata approved an agreement to fully transfer the Arcata and Mad River Transit System to the Humboldt Transit Authority, and in July 2025 the transfer was complete.

On August 21, 2023, the Green and Gold route was opened to ridership to provide evening bus service. The route ceased operations in August 2026 following reduced funding from California State Polytechnic University.

== Routes ==
Arcata and Mad River Transit System operates three routes: "Gold," "Orange," and "Red." Service is most extensive when Cal Poly Humboldt is in session. All three routes operate on 60-minute intervals, beginning and ending each round-trip at the Arcata Transit Center.

The Red and Gold routes operate from 7 a.m. to 7 p.m. on weekdays, excluding holidays. The Orange route operates 7 p.m. to 10 p.m. on weekdays, excluding holidays, and 7 a.m. to 10 p.m. on Saturdays and holidays when Cal Poly Humboldt is in session. When Cal Poly Humboldt is not in session, the Orange route instead operates 7 a.m. to 7 p.m. on Saturdays and holidays only.
