= Humboldt Transit Authority =

Transit authority overview
- Formed: 1975
- Type: Joint powers authority
- Jurisdiction: Humboldt County, California
- Website: https://hta.org/

Humboldt Transit Authority (HTA) is a transit authority that operates several transit services in Humboldt County, California. HTA was established in 1975, and is a joint powers authority between Humboldt County, Arcata, Eureka, Fortuna, Rio Dell, and Trinidad. According to the Federal Transit Administration's National Transit Database, in 2024 the Humboldt Transit Authority provided 480,195 unlinked passenger trips by bus, commuter bus, and demand response services.

== Services ==
=== Fixed-route services ===
HTA provides fixed-route transportation services through several transit systems and routes:

- Arcata and Mad River Transit System
- North State Express 101 — an express service between Eureka and Ukiah in Mendocino County along U.S. Route 101
- Redwood Transit System
- Southern Humboldt Intercity — a service between Eureka and Benbow along U.S. Route 101
- Willow Creek Intercity

In addition to the above systems, HTA also operates bus service for the Eureka Transit Service under a contract with the City of Eureka. Unlike the other transit systems, which are owned by Humboldt Transit Authority, Eureka Transit Service is owned by the City of Eureka.

HTA also previously operated the Blue Lake Rancheria Transit System until it ceased operations in October 2023.

=== Other services ===
Apart from fixed-route services, HTA operates Dial-A-Ride, which provides paratransit services within the Humboldt Country, and Ride Humboldt Flex, an on-demand bus service that operates in the area around Arcata and Eureka.
