= Hybrid electric bus =

Bus that combines internal combustion and electric propulsion systems

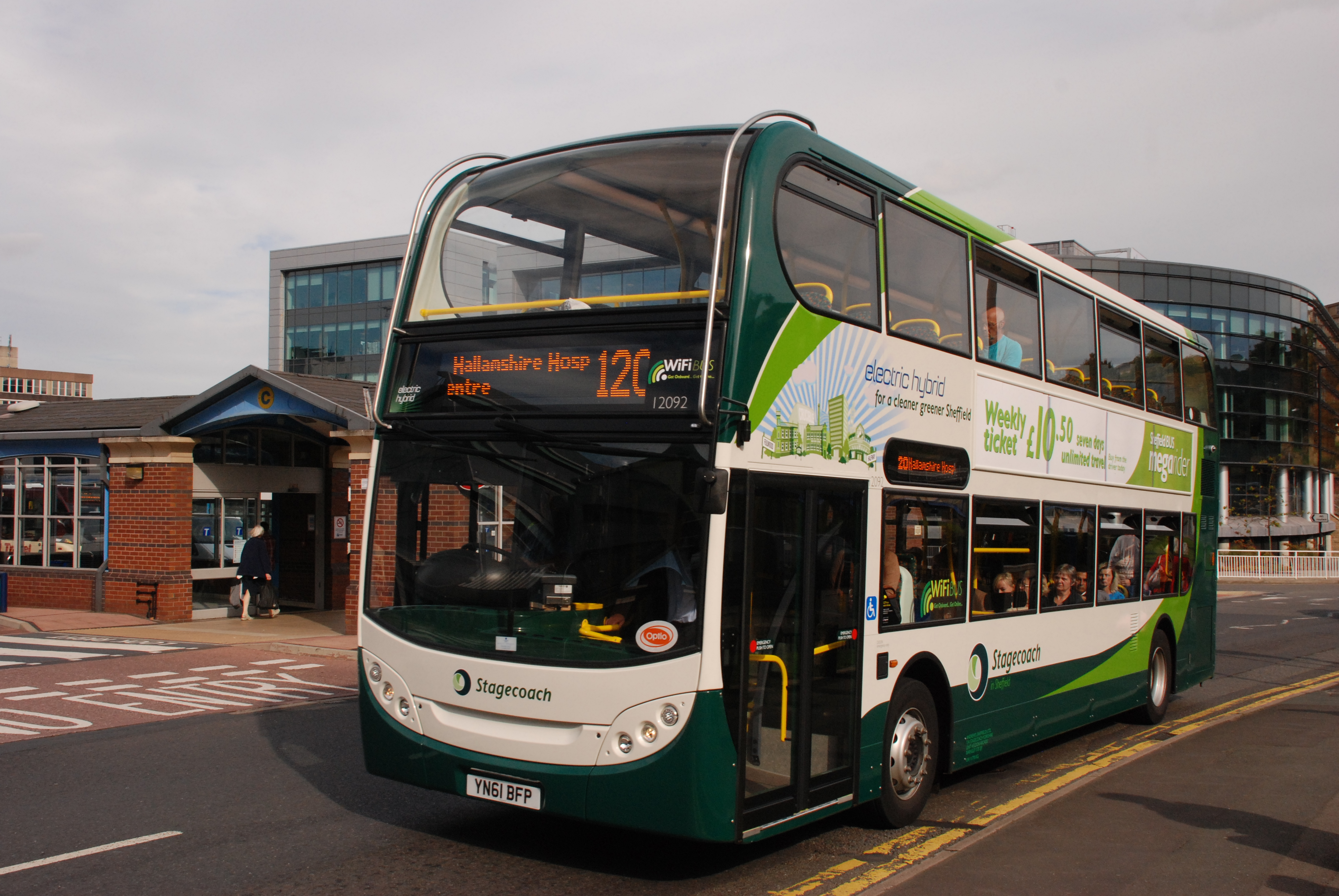
Stagecoach Sheffield Alexander Dennis Enviro400H in 2011, with a livery showcasing its hybrid propulsion.

A hybrid electric bus is a bus that combines a conventional internal combustion engine propulsion system with an electric propulsion system. These types of buses normally use a diesel–electric powertrain and are also known as hybrid diesel–electric buses.

The introduction of hybrid electric vehicles and other green vehicles for purposes of public transport forms a part of sustainable transport schemes.

== Powertrain ==
=== Types of hybrid vehicle drivetrain ===
A hybrid electric bus may have either a parallel powertrain (e.g., Volvo B5LH) or a series powertrain (e.g., some versions of the Alexander Dennis Enviro400 MMC). Since 2003, Allison Transmission has produced dual-mode hybrid drive units which take the place of a conventional transmission, mostly for transit buses in North America; as the name implies, it is able to switch between series and parallel modes.

=== Plug-in hybrid ===
A plug-in hybrid school bus effort began in 2003 in Raleigh, NC, when Advanced Energy began working between districts across the country and manufacturers to understand the needs of both. The effort demonstrated both a technical and business feasibility and as a result was able to secure funding in 2005 from NASEO to purchase up to 20 buses. The resulting RFP from Advanced Energy was won by IC Bus using a product jointly produced with Enova for a 22-mile plug-in hybrid product with a $140k premium over existing buses. The buses performed well in testing with 70% reductions in fuel usage although only in specific conditions.

The United States Department of Energy (USDOE) announced the selection of Navistar Corporation for a cost-shared award of up to $10 million to develop, test, and deploy plug-in hybrid electric (PHEV) school buses. The project aims to deploy 60 vehicles for a three-year period in school bus fleets across the nation. The vehicles will be capable of running in either electric-only or hybrid modes and will be recharged from a standard electrical outlet. Because electricity will be their primary fuel, they will consume less petroleum than standard vehicles. To develop the PHEV school bus, Navistar will examine a range of hybrid architectures and evaluate advanced energy storage devices, with the goal of developing a vehicle with a 40-mile (64 km) electric range. Travel beyond the 40-mile (64 km) range will be facilitated by a clean Diesel engine capable of running on renewable fuels. The DOE funding will cover up to half of the project's cost and will be provided over three years, subject to annual appropriations.

=== Tribrid Bus ===
- Tribrid buses have been developed by the University of Glamorgan in Wales. They are powered by hydrogen fuel or solar cells, batteries and ultracapacitors.

== Air pollution and greenhouse gas emissions ==
A report prepared by Purdue University suggests introducing more hybrid Diesel–electric buses and a fuel containing 20% biodiesel (BD20) would further reduce greenhouse emissions and petroleum consumption.

== Manufacturers ==
Hybrid buses

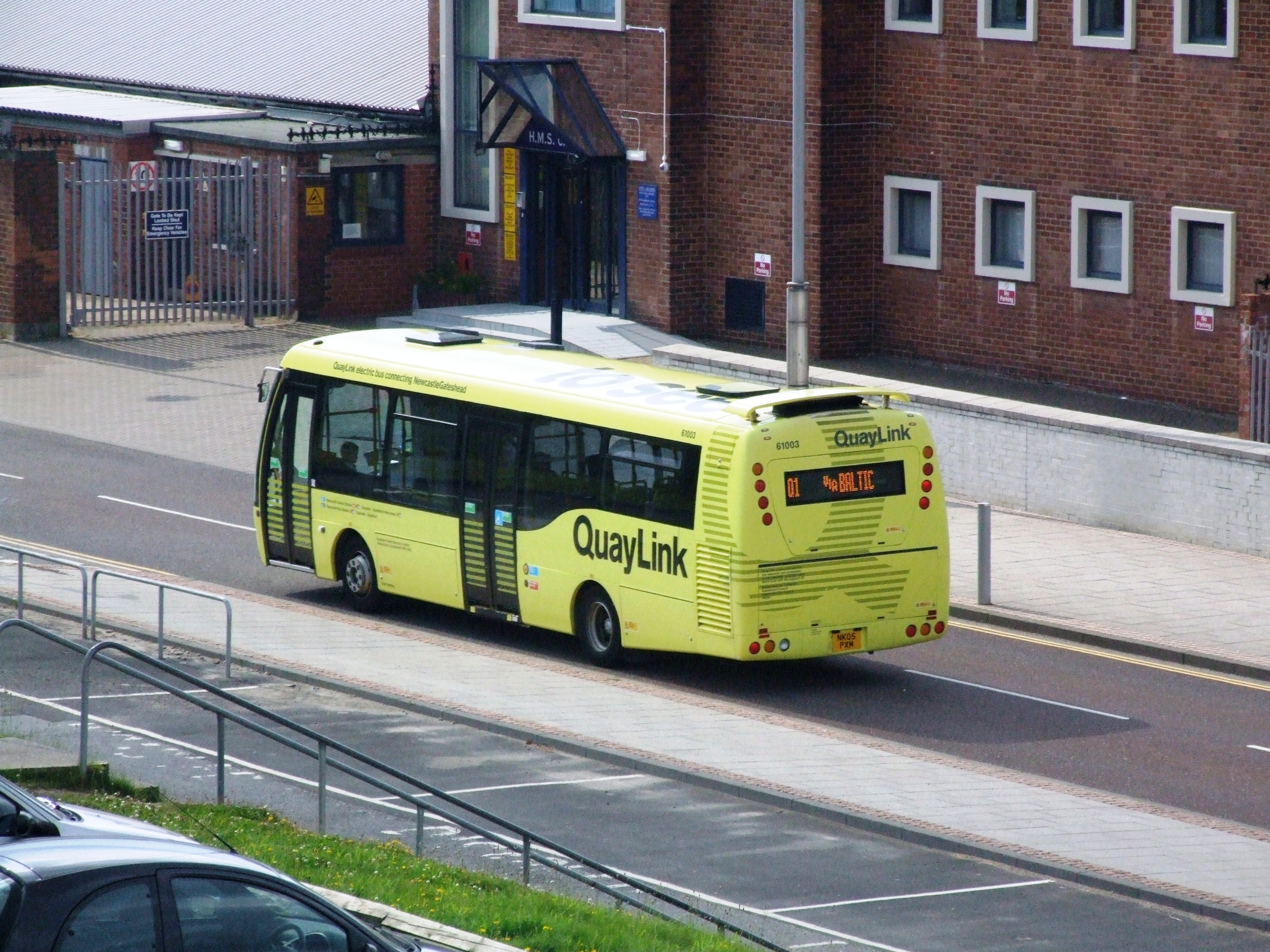
A Designline-built gas turbine-electric bus on the QuayLink service in Tyne and Wear, England

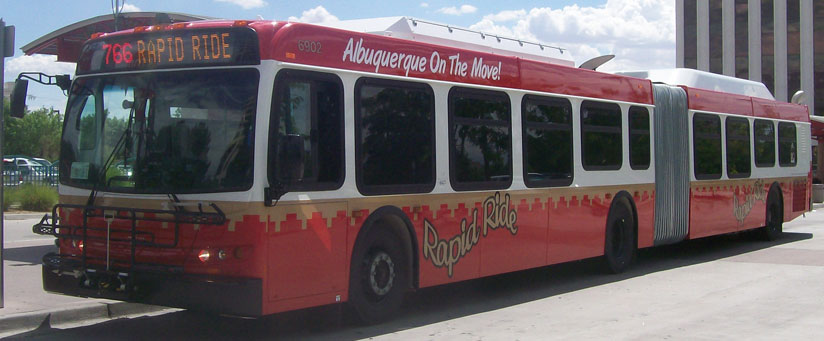
A New Flyer Industries DE60LFR hybrid articulated bus

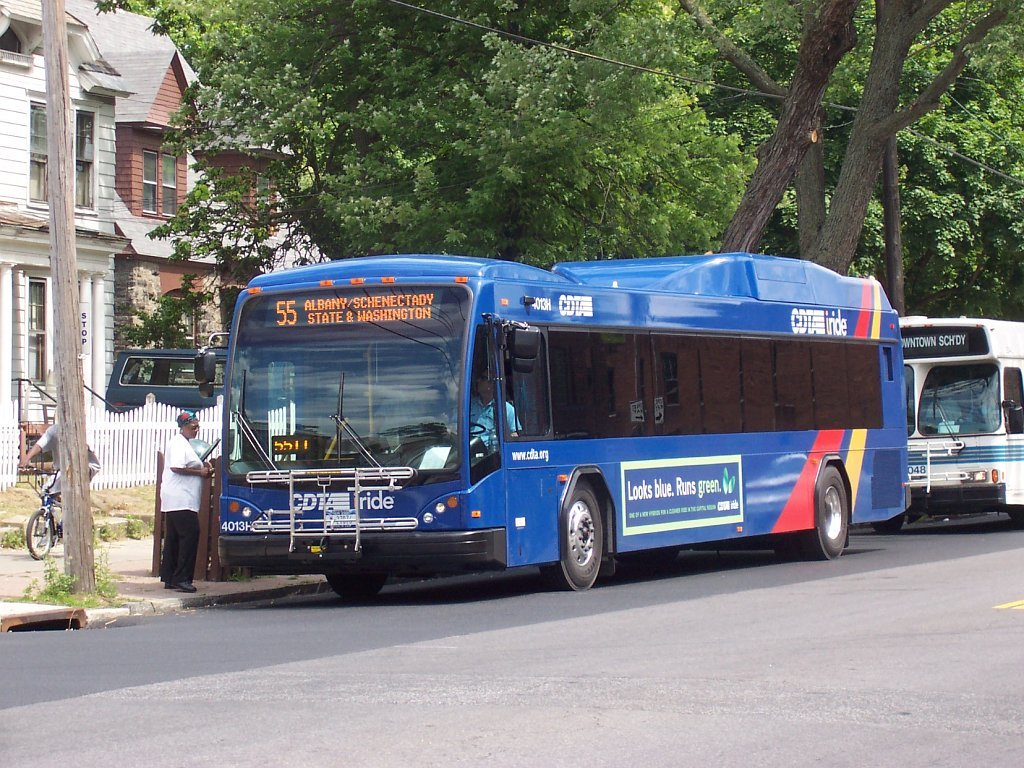
A Gillig BRT hybrid

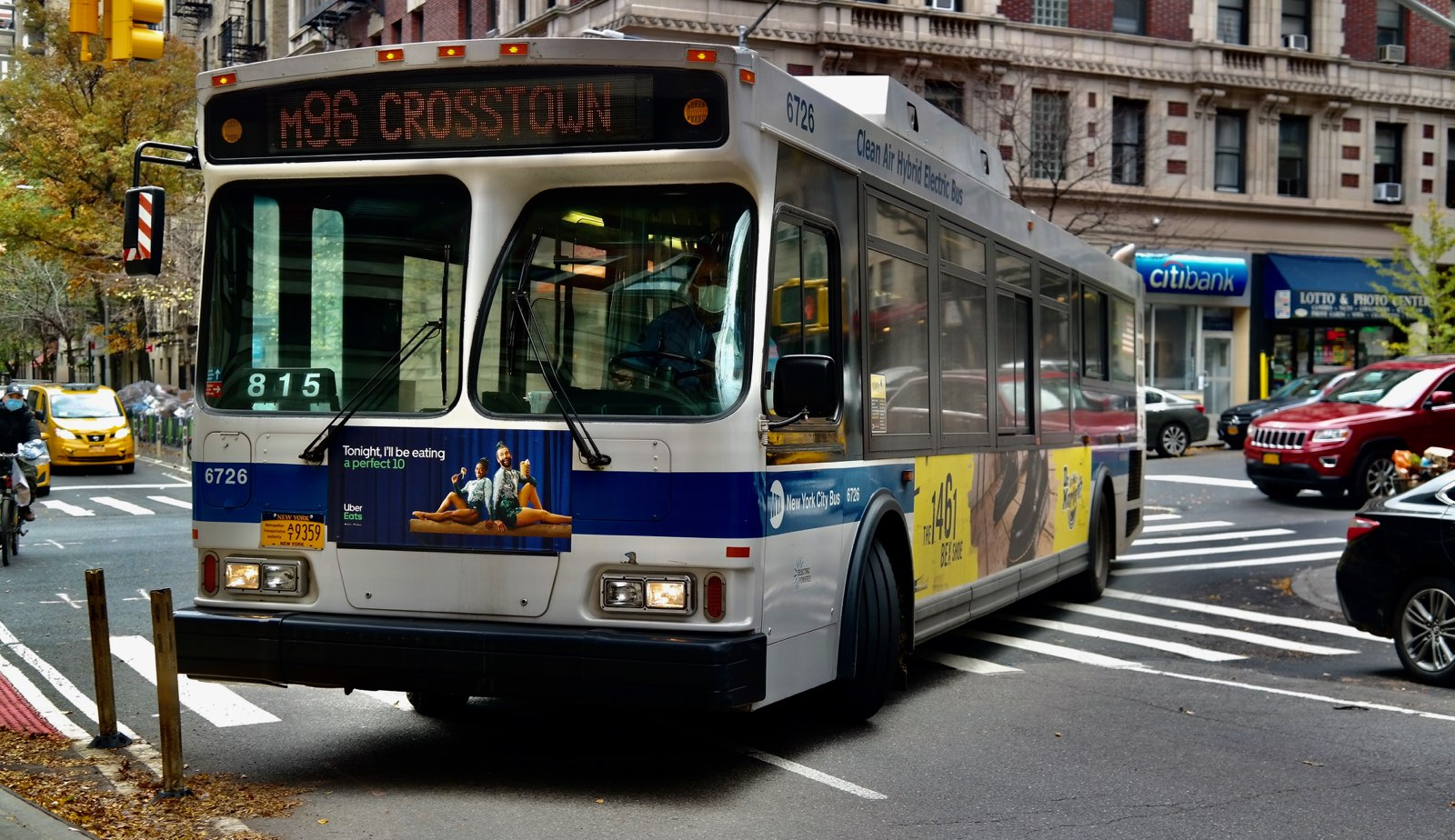
An OBI Orion VII OG HEV 07.501 in service with the Metropolitan Transportation Authority in New York City

Current manufacturers of Diesel–electric hybrid buses include Alexander Dennis, Azure Dynamics Corporation, Ebus, Eletra (Brazil), New Flyer Industries, Tata (India), Gillig, Motor Coach Industries, Novabus, Orion Bus Industries, Daimler AG's Mitsubishi Fuso, MAN, Designline, BAE Systems, Volvo Buses, VDL Bus & Coach, Wrightbus, Castrosua, Tata Hispano and many more.

Toyota claims to have started with the Coaster Hybrid Bus in 1997 on the Japanese market. Since 1999, Hybrid electric buses with gas turbine generators have been developed by several manufacturers in the US and New Zealand, with the most successful design being the buses made by Designline of New Zealand. The first model went into commercial service in Christchurch since 1999, and later models were sold for daily service in Auckland, Hong Kong, Newcastle upon Tyne, and Tokyo. The Whispering Wheel bus is another HEV using in-wheel motors. It was tested in winter 2003–04 in Apeldoorn in the Netherlands.

In Japan, Mitsubishi Fuso have developed a diesel engine hybrid bus using lithium batteries in 2002, and this model has since seen limited service in several Japanese cities. The Blue Ribbon City Hybrid bus was presented by Hino, a Toyota affiliate, in January 2005.

For the North American transit bus market, New Flyer Industries, Gillig, and Nova Bus produce hybrid electric buses using components from either BAE Systems (series hybrid, initially branded HybriDrive and now branded Series-E), or Allison Transmission (parallel/series hybrid, branded Hybrid EP or H 40/50 EP). In May 2003 General Motors started to tour with hybrid electric buses developed together with Allison. General Electric introduced its hybrid electric gear shifters on the market in 2005. Several hundreds of those buses have entered into daily operation in the U.S. In 2006, Nova Bus, which had previously marketed the RTS hybrid before that model was discontinued, added a Diesel–electric hybrid option for its LFS series.

In the United Kingdom, Wrightbus has introduced a development of the London "Double-Decker", a new interpretation of the traditional red buses that are a feature of the extreme traffic density in London. The Wright Pulsar Gemini HEV bus uses a small Diesel engine with electric storage through a lithium ion battery pack. The use of a 1.9-litre Diesel instead of the typical 7.0-litre engine in a traditional bus demonstrates the possible advantages of serial hybrids in extremely traffic-dense environments. Based on a London test cycle, a reduction in CO_{2} emissions of 31% and fuel savings in the range of 40% have been demonstrated, compared with a "Euro-4" compliant bus.

=== Former hybrid bus manufacturers ===
- ISE Corporation ThunderVolt (filed for bankruptcy in 2010)
- Azure Dynamics (filed for bankruptcy in 2012)

=== Conversions ===
Hybrid Electric Vehicle Technologies (HEVT) makes conversions of new and used vehicles (aftermarket and retrofit conversions), from combustion buses and conventional hybrid electric buses into plug-in buses.

== List of transit authorities using hybrid electric buses ==
Transit authorities that use hybrid electric buses:

=== North America ===
==== United States ====
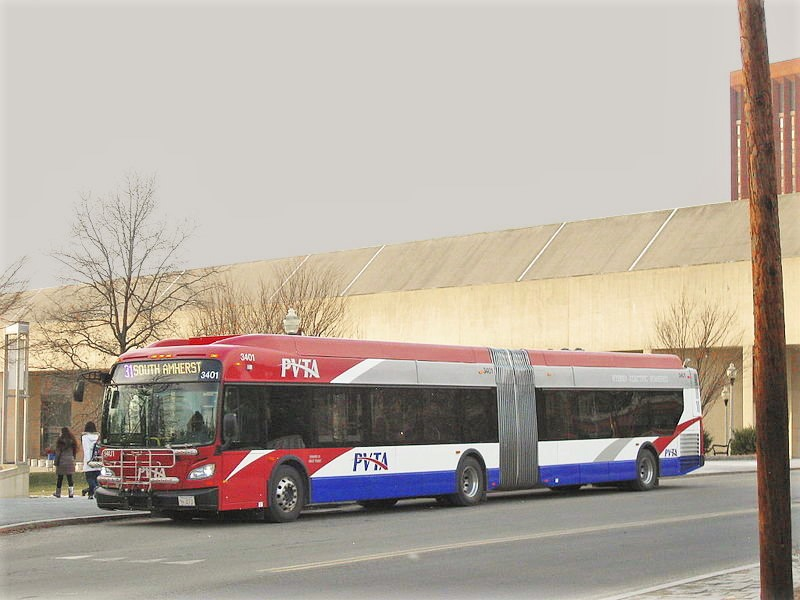
A New Flyer Industries hybrid-electric articulated bus on the University of Massachusetts Amherst campus, operated by the school

Federal funding generally comes from the federal Diesel Emissions Reduction Act.

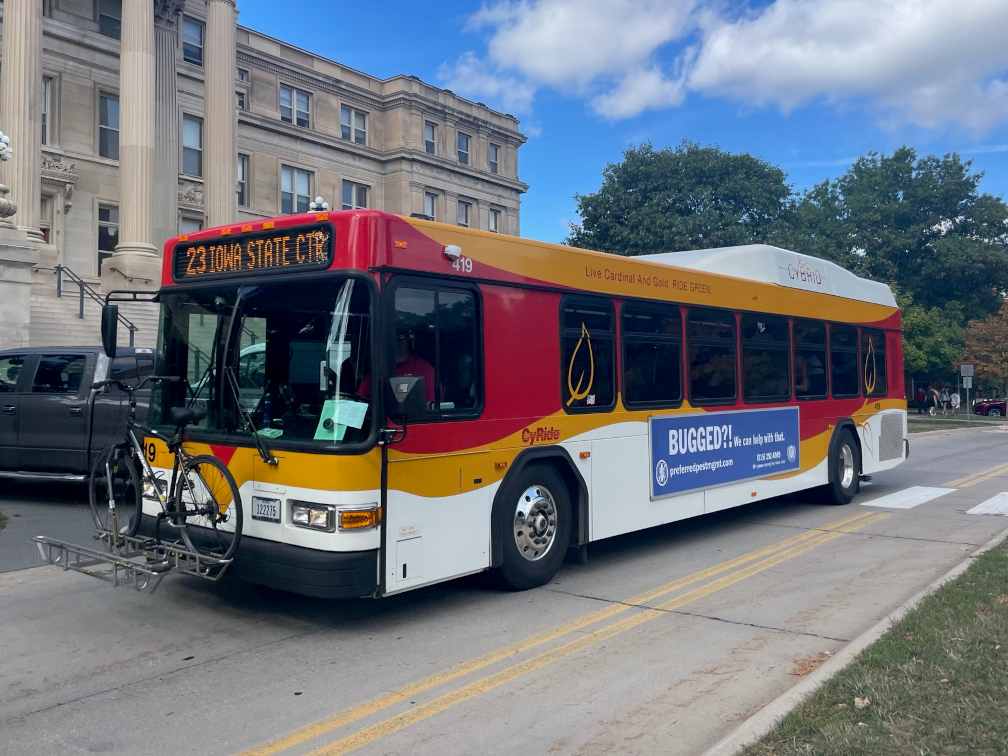
A Gillig 40 foot hybrid-electric bus equipped with a Voith DIWAhybrid transmission, operated by CyRide.

- ABQ RIDE (Albuquerque, New Mexico)
- Ann Arbor Area Transportation Authority (AAATA) (Ann Arbor, Michigan)
- Autoridad Metropolitana de Autobuses (San Juan, Puerto Rico)
- Baltimore, Maryland
- Bee-Line Bus System (Westchester County, New York)
- Berks Area Reading Transportation Authority (Berks County, Pennsylvania)
- Bloomington Transit (Bloomington, Indiana)
- Broome County Transit (Broome County, New York)
- Broward County Transit (Broward County, Florida)
- Capital Area Transportation Authority (Lansing, Michigan)
- Capital District Transportation Authority (Albany, New York)
- Central New York Regional Transportation Authority (Syracuse, New York)
- Charlotte Area Transit System (Charlotte, North Carolina)
- Chatham Area Transit (Savannah, Georgia)
- Chicago Transit Authority
- Citibus (Lubbock, Texas)
- Central Ohio Transit Authority (Columbus, Ohio)
- Clarksville Transit System (CTS) (Clarksville, Tennessee)
- Community Transit (Snohomish County, Washington)
- C-Tran (Vancouver, Washington)
- CyRide (Ames, Iowa)
- Citilink (Fort Wayne, Indiana)
- Cache Valley Transit District (Logan, Utah)
- DART First State (Delaware)
- Des Moines Area Regional Transit (Des Moines, Iowa)
- Durham Area Transit Authority (Durham, North Carolina)
- Eureka Transit Service (Eureka, California)
- GoRaleigh (formerly Capital Area Transit) (Raleigh, North Carolina)
- Greater Lafayette Public Transportation Corporation (Lafayette, IN and West Lafayette, IN)
- Greater Lynchburg Transit Company (Lynchburg, VA)
- Greenville Area Transit (Greenville, North Carolina)
- Hillsborough Area Regional Transit (Hillsborough County, Florida)
- Howard Transit, (Howard County, Maryland)
- IndyGo (Indianapolis, Indiana)
- Jacksonville Transportation Authority
- Kanawha Valley Regional Transportation Authority
- Kansas City Area Transportation Authority
- King County Metro Transit Authority (Seattle, Washington)
- Lane Transit District (Lane County, Oregon)
- Long Beach Transit (Long Beach, California)
- LACMTA (Los Angeles, California)
- LANta (Lehigh Valley, Pennsylvania)
- Madison Metro Transit (Wisconsin)
- Manatee County Area Transit (Manatee County, Florida)
- Massachusetts Bay Transportation Authority (Boston, MA)
- MATA (Memphis, Tennessee)
- MATBUS – Metro Area Transit (Fargo, ND – Moorhead, MN)
- Metropolitan Transit Authority of Harris County, Texas (Houston, Texas)
- Minneapolis-Saint Paul Metro Transit
- MTA Maryland (Baltimore, Maryland)
- Nashville Metropolitan Transit Authority, doing business as WeGo Public Transit
- New Jersey Transit
- New York City Transit Authority
- New Orleans Regional Transit Authority
- Niagara Frontier Transportation Authority (Buffalo, New York)
- North County Transit District (North San Diego County, California)
- Orange County Transportation Authority (Orange County, California)
- Pioneer Valley Transit Authority (Springfield, Massachusetts)
- Port Authority of Allegheny County (Pittsburgh, Pennsylvania)
- Regional Transportation Commission of Southern Nevada/Citizens Area Transit (Las Vegas, Nevada)
- Rhode Island Public Transit Authority (Providence, Rhode Island). 1 gas and 1 diesel for testing use only; diesel was converted gas was hybrid from factory.
- Roaring Fork Transportation Authority (Aspen, Colorado)
- San Diego Metropolitan Transit System/San Diego Transit (San Diego, California)
- San Francisco MUNI (San Francisco, California)
- San Joaquin Regional Transit District (Stockton, California)
- Santa Clara Valley Transportation Authority - VTA (Santa Clara County, California)
- Santa Rosa CityBus (Santa Rosa, California)
- Sarasota County Area Transit (Sarasota County, Florida)
- Sound Transit (Puget Sound region, Washington)
- SEPTA (Philadelphia, Pennsylvania)
- Southwest Ohio Regional Transit Authority (Cincinnati, Ohio)
- Spokane Transit Authority (Spokane, Washington)
- TCAT (Ithaca, NY)
- TheBus (Honolulu, Hawaii)
- The Rapid The Interurban Transit Partnership Grand Rapids, Michigan *Has 5 vehicles used in fixed route service.
- TriMet (Portland, Oregon): two vehicles
- University of Michigan parking and transportation services (Ann Arbor, Michigan)
- Utah Transit Authority (Salt Lake City, Utah)
- Washington Metropolitan Area Transit Authority

==== Canada ====
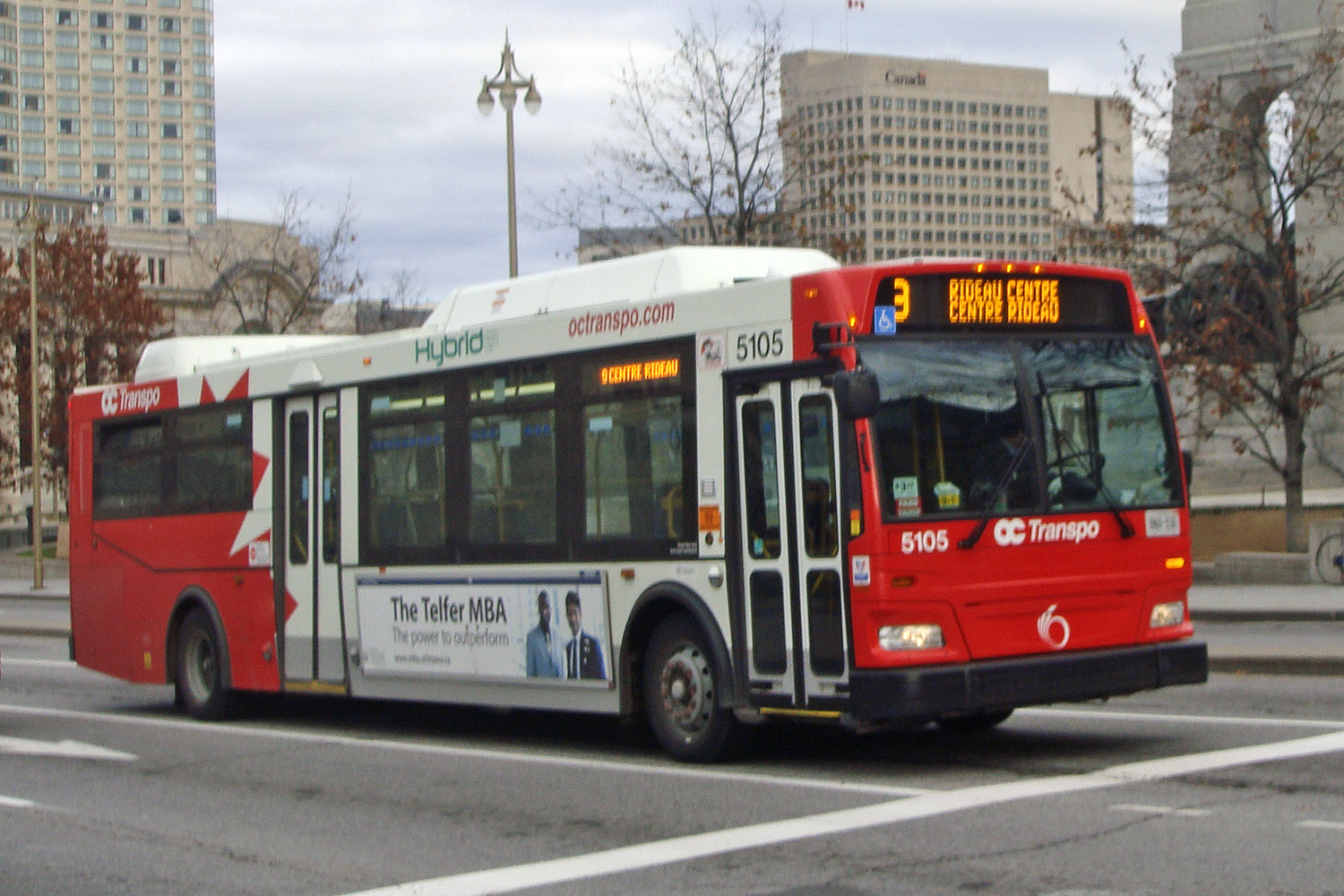
OC Transpo hybrid bus, Ottawa

- Transit Windsor (Windsor, Ontario)
- Edmonton Transit System (Edmonton, Alberta)
- Hamilton Street Railway (Hamilton, Ontario)
- OC Transpo (Ottawa, Ontario)
- RTC (Quebec City, Quebec)
- RTL (Longueuil, Quebec)
- Saskatoon Transit, Saskatchewan
- STL (Laval, Quebec)
- STL (Lévis, Quebec)
- STM (Montreal, Quebec)
- STO (Gatineau, Quebec)
- STS (Sherbrooke, Quebec)
- St. Catharines Transit Commission (St. Catharines, Ontario)
- Toronto Transit Commission buses [673 out of 2137 regular buses are hybrid as of 2020]
- Coast Mountain Bus Company (Vancouver, British Columbia)
- BC Transit (Kelowna and Victoria).
- GRT (Waterloo, Ontario) [currently 6 out of 218 buses in service are hybrid]
- London Transit Commission (London, Ontario)
- Strathcona County Transit (Strathcona County, Alberta) [as of 2014, 10 Nova Bus LFS HEV Diesel–electric hybrid buses remain in service]
- Halifax Transit, Halifax, Nova Scotia. Owned two hybrid buses, both are retired as of August 2025.
- Lethbridge Transit, Lethbridge, Alberta. 11 out of 42 buses are hybrid.
- Miway (Mississauga, Ontario)
- Durham Region Transit
- Brampton Transit/ZUM
- Niagara Region Transit
- SSM (1 ex TTC Orion VII NG HEV)
- Belleville Transit (Belleville, Ontario) 1 out of 18 buses is hybrid-electric. Three new hybrid buses are on order.

=== Asia ===
==== China ====
- Beijing Public Transport
- Kunming Bus
- Shenzhen Bus Group
- Shenzhen Eastern Bus
- Shenzhen Western Bus
- Jinan Bus
- Zhengzhou Bus Group

==== Hong Kong ====
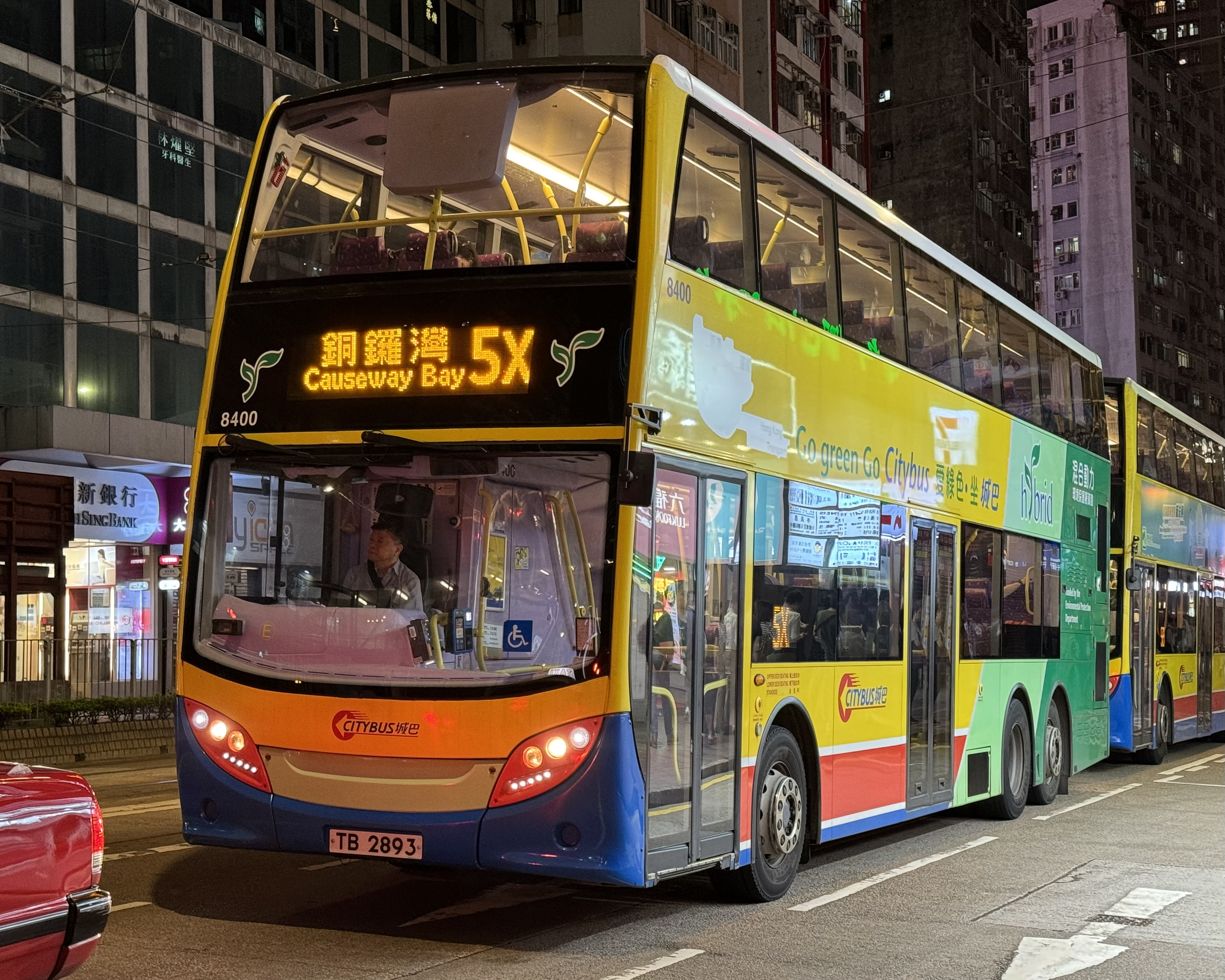
An Alexander Dennis Enviro500H operated by Citybus

- Citybus
- New World First Bus
- Kowloon Motor Bus

==== India ====
- Delhi Multi-Module Transit
- Mumbai BEST CNG-Hybrid

==== Iran ====
- Vehicle, Fuel and Environment Research Institute (VFERI)

==== Pakistan ====
- TransPeshawar
- Greenline, Karachi

==== Japan ====
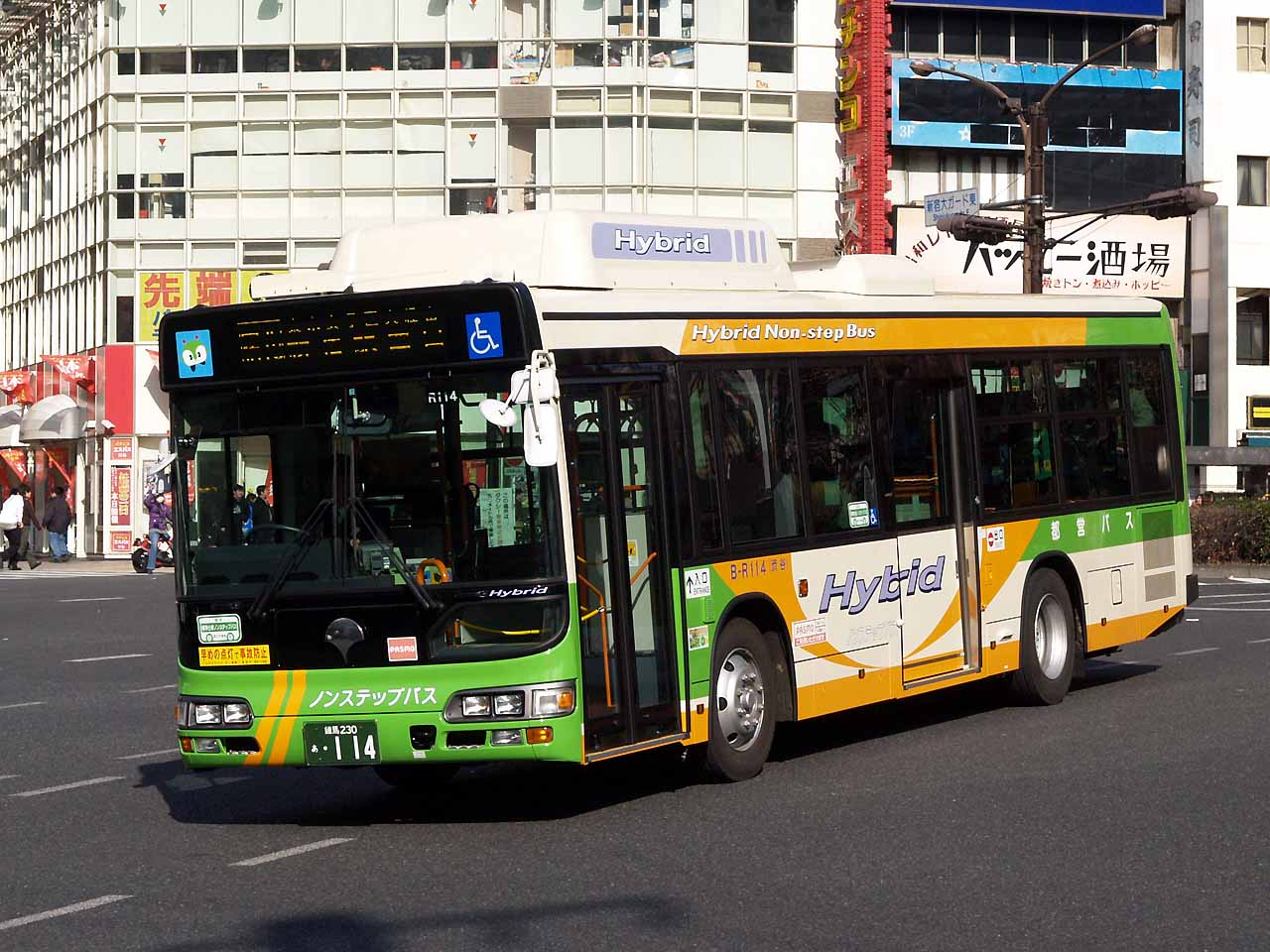
A hybrid electric bus in Japan

- Marunouchi Shuttle
- Toei Bus
- Osaka City Bus

etc.

==== Philippines ====
- Green Frog Hybrid Buses
- Genesis Transport/JoyBus [10 units deployed for Balanga-PITX provincial route]

==== Singapore ====
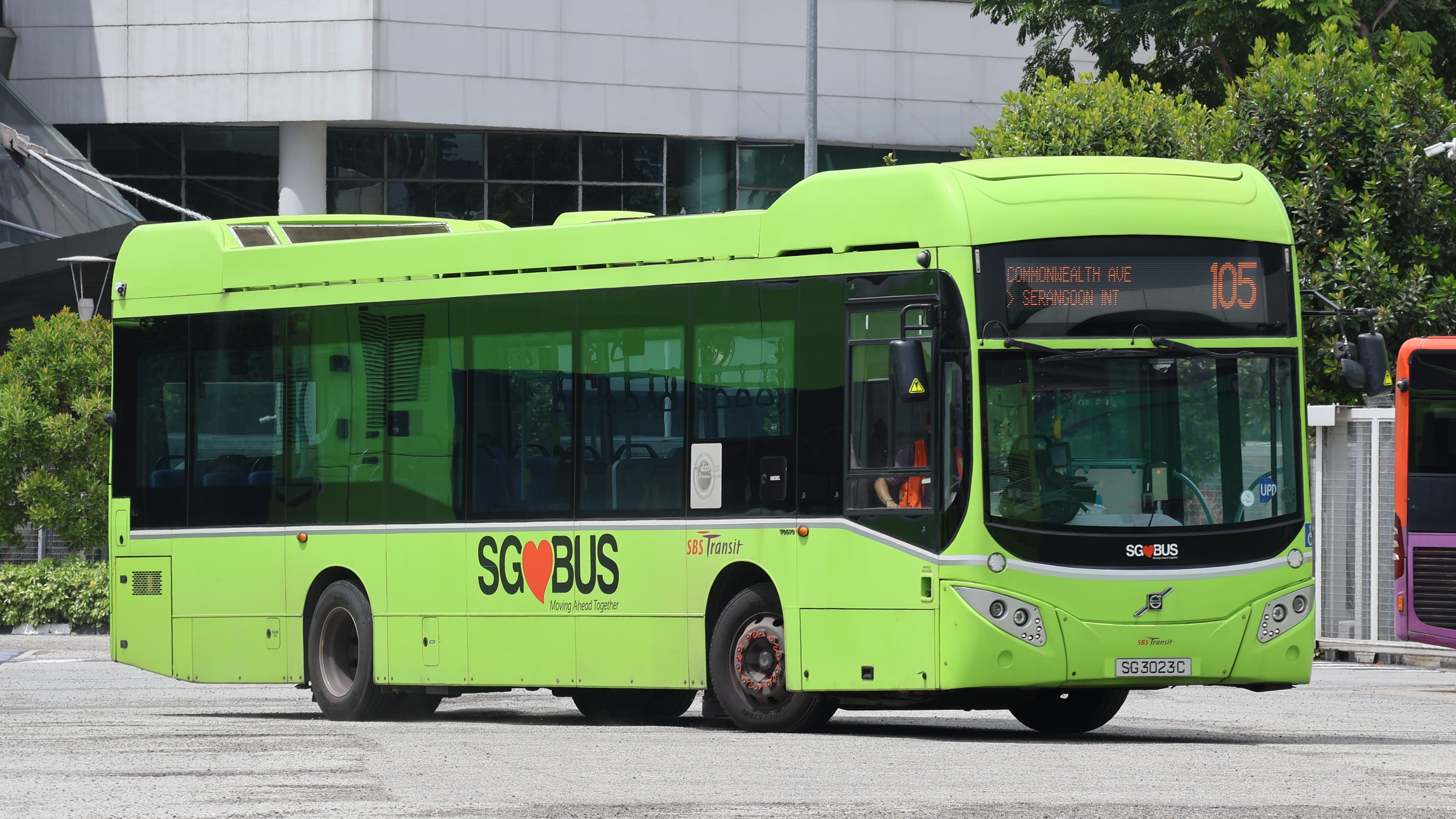
SBS Transit MCV Evora-bodied Volvo B5L hybrid-diesel electric bus

- SBS Transit
- SMRT Buses
- Tower Transit Singapore

==== Thailand ====
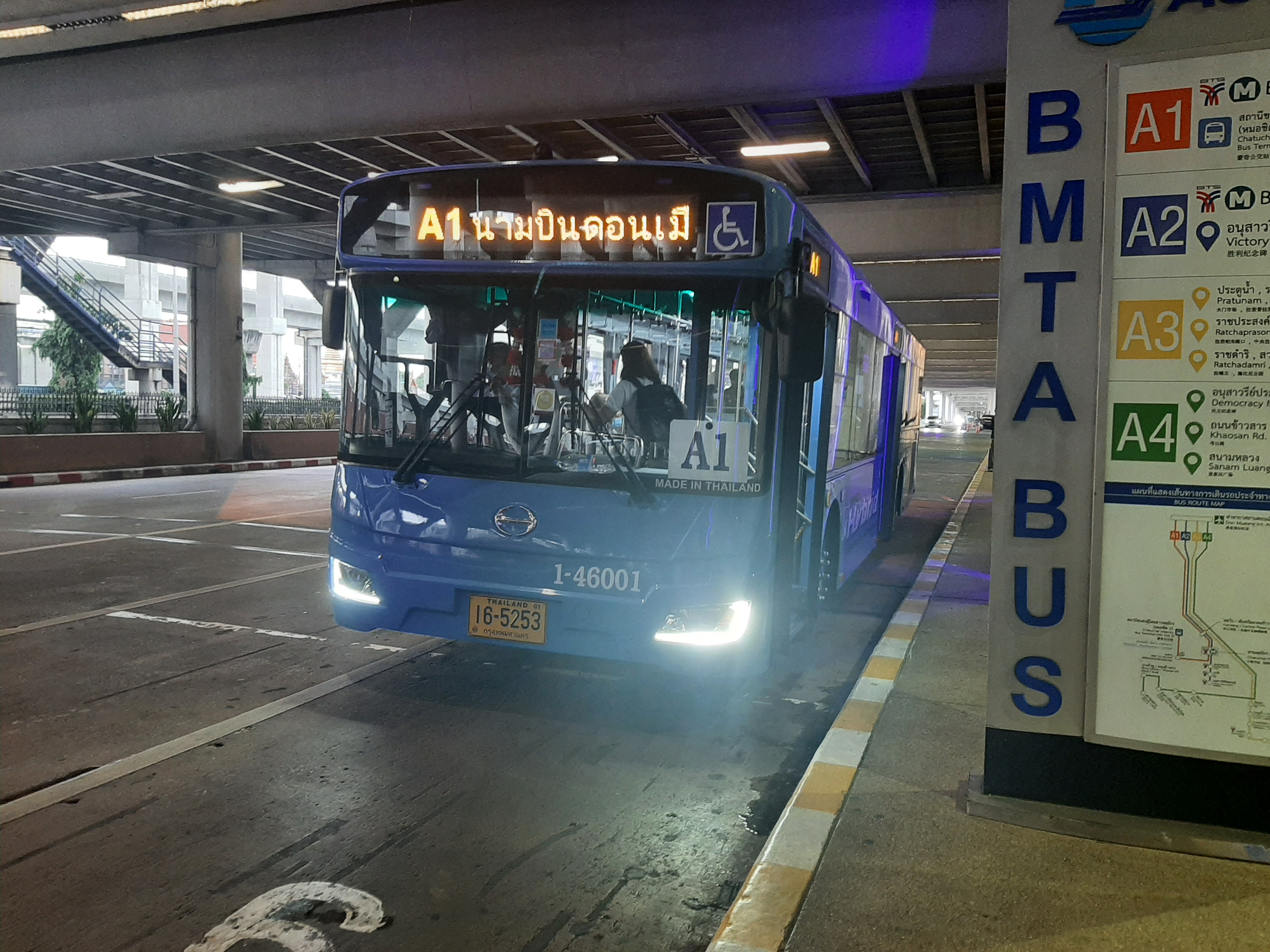
Hino HU2ASKP-VJT in Bangkok, Thailand, operator by BMTA

- BMTA

=== Europe ===
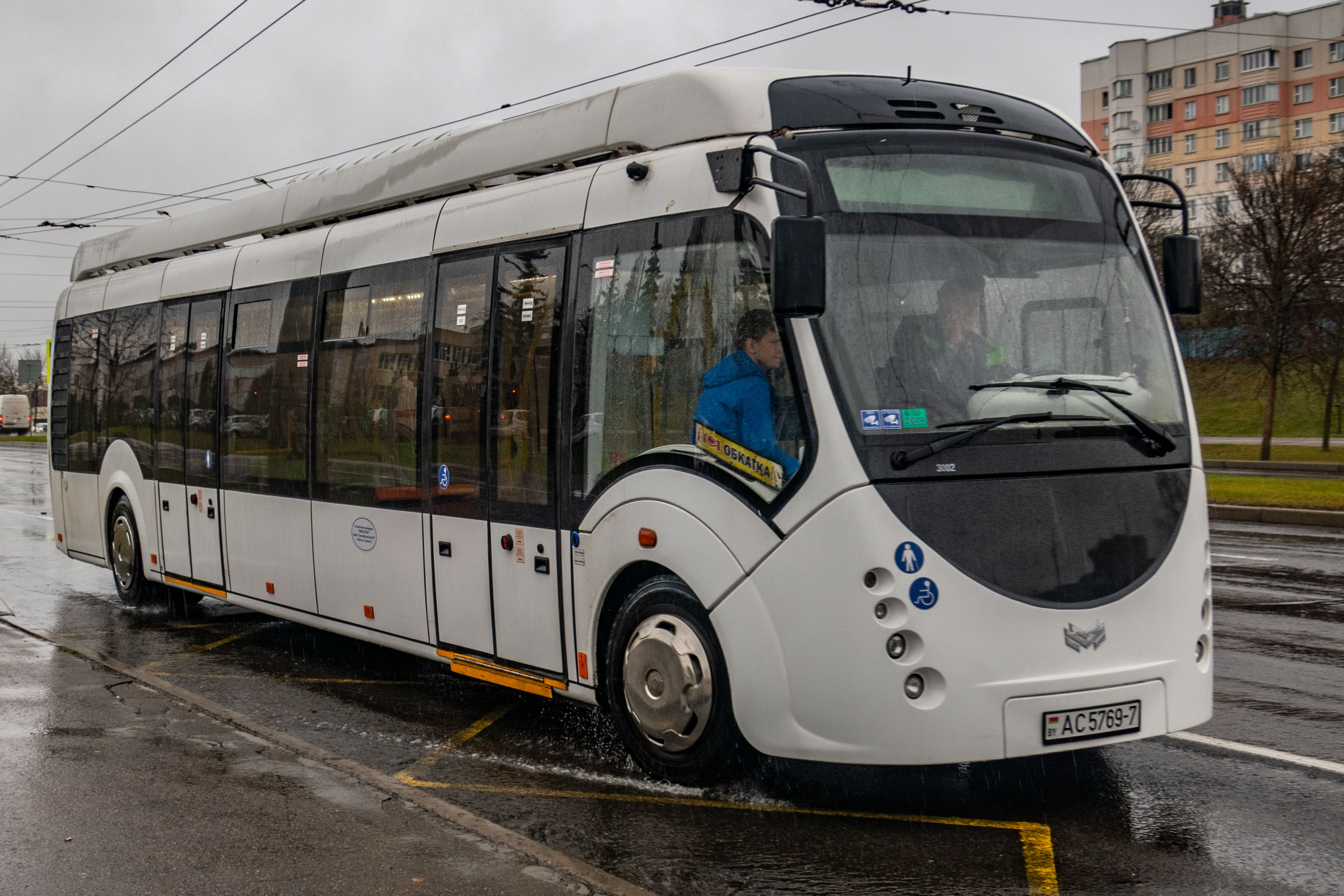
AKSM-4202K Vitovt Hybrid in Minsk, Belarus

==== Belarus ====
- Minsk
- Slutsk

==== Germany ====
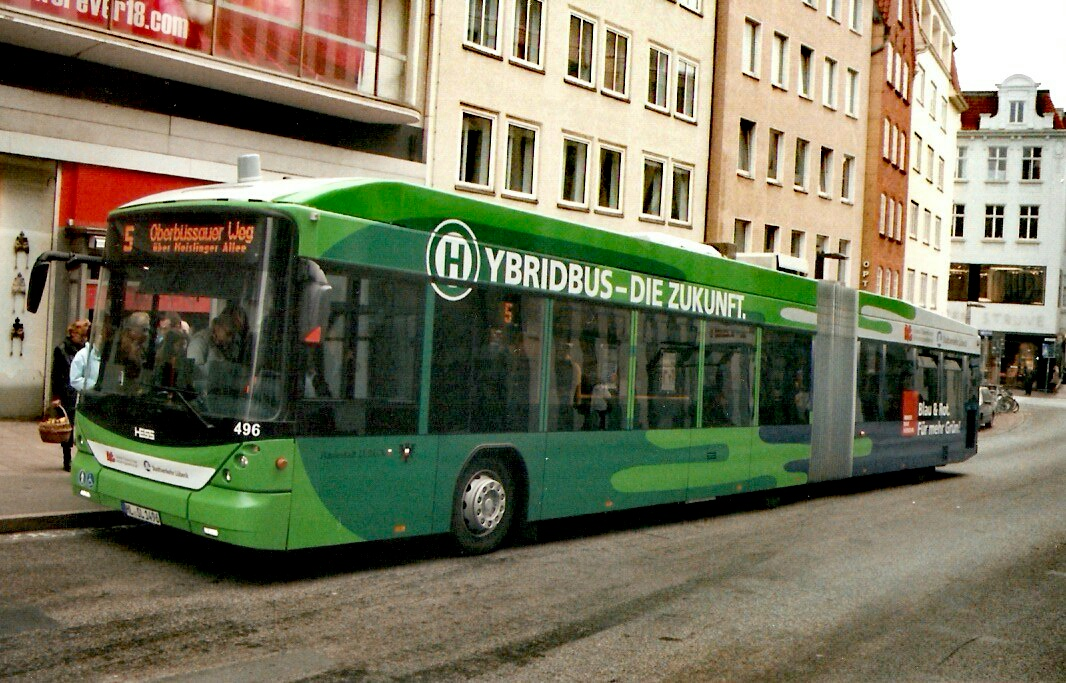
A hybrid electric bus in Lübeck, Germany

- Dresden
- Hagen
- Lübeck
- Munich
- Nuremberg

==== Hungary ====
- Budapest – The fleet consists of 28 Volvo 7900A Hybrid (articulated).
- Kecskemét – The fleet consists of 20 Mercedes-Benz Citaro G BlueTec®-Hybrid (articulated).

==== Norway ====
- Nettbuss, Hamar
- Ruter, Oslo
- Nettbuss, Trondheim
- Nettbuss, Arendal
- Nobina, Tromsø
- Vestviken Kollektivtrafikk, Vestfold. Scania Citywide.

==== Romania ====
- STB, Bucharest – The fleet consists of 130 Mercedes-Benz Citaro Hybrid.
- Transurb, Galati - using 20 hybrid buses model Solaris Urbino 12 Hybrid.
- Transurban, Satu Mare - using 17 hybrid buses, 15 Solaris Urbino 12 Hybrid and 2 Solaris Urbino 18 Hybrid.
- S.P.M.T., Târgoviște - using 28 Mercedes Citaro Hybrid.
- Publitrans 2000, Pitești - using 20 Mercedes Conecto Hybrid.

==== UK ====
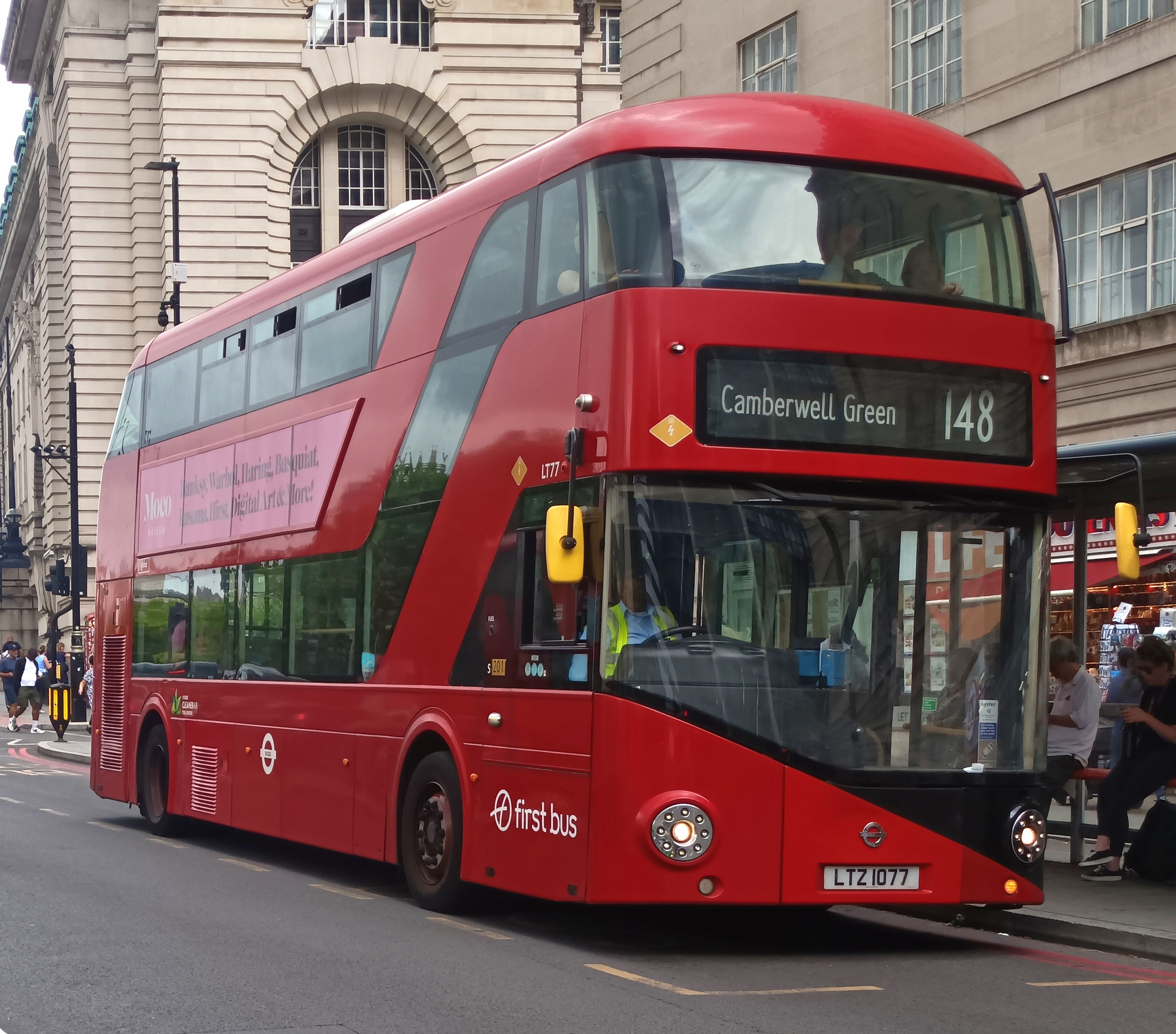
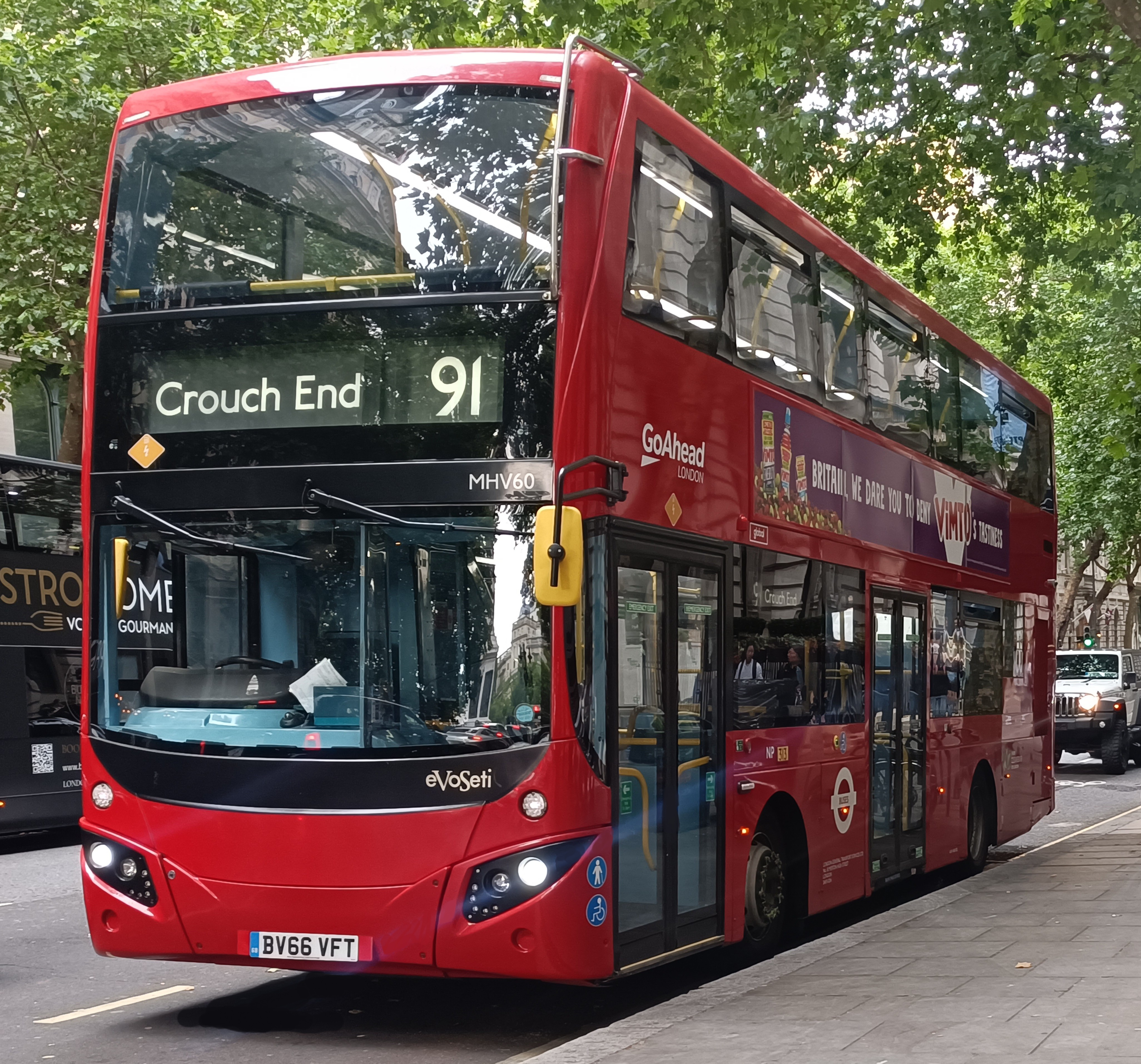
London has the largest hybrid bus fleet in the UK

The Green Bus Fund is a fund which is supporting bus companies and local authorities in the UK to help them buy new electric buses.

- London Buses, London. This is the largest fleet in the UK, with around 2,300 vehicles in use.
- National Express West Midlands, Birmingham – 48 currently in use.
- Stagecoach, Manchester, Oxford, Sheffield, Newcastle
- Oxford Bus Company, Oxfordshire – 52 currently
- FirstGroup, Bath, Somerset, Bristol, Manchester Metroshuttle, Leeds, Essex
- Reading Buses
- Lothian Buses
- Cumfybus, Merseyside
- Brighton & Hove
- Stagecoach East Scotland, Aberdeen
- Arriva Yorkshire, from April 2013

==== Spain ====
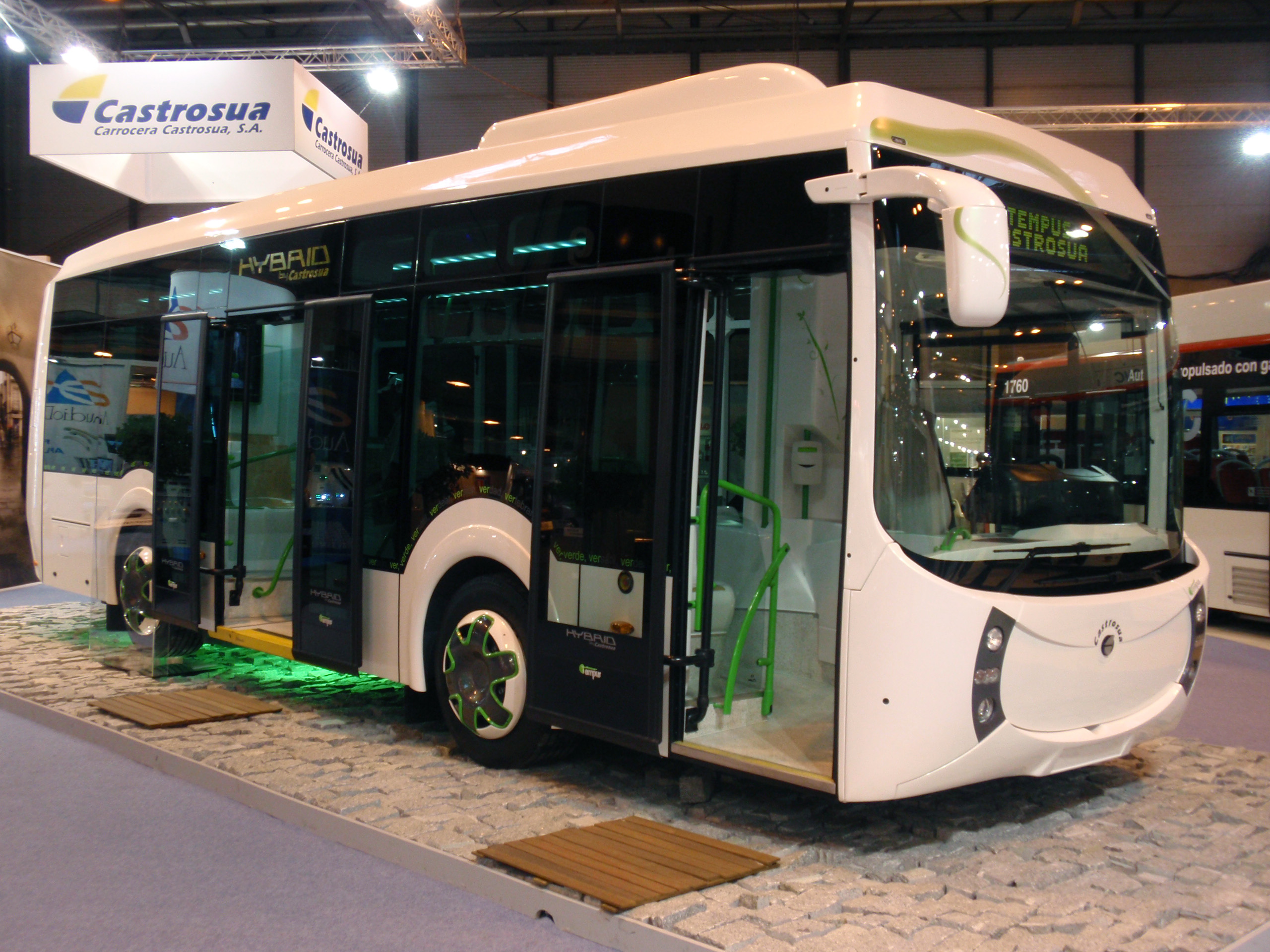
Castrosua Tempus hybrid city bus at the 2008 FIAA (International Bus and Coach Fair) in Madrid

- Barcelona (MAN Lion's City Hybrid)
- Empresa Municipal de Transportes, Madrid
- Figueres, within the electric bus Project, IDAE

==== Sweden ====
- Jönköpings Länstrafik, Jönköping. MAN Lion's City Hybrid.
- Göteborgs Spårvägar, Gothenburg. Volvo 7700 Hybrid.
- Storstockholms Lokaltrafik, Stockholm. MAN Lion's City Hybrid.

==== Other European countries ====
- Ljubljanski potniški promet (5 Kutsenits Hydra City II/III Hybrid's), Ljubljana, Slovenia
- Paris: RATP is using a hybrid electric bus outfitted with ultracapacitors; the model used is the MAN Lion's City Hybrid.
- Milan, Italy
- Team Trafikk, Trondheim, Norway, with 10 Volvo B5L
- Vienna, Austria
- PostAuto, Switzerland: one vehicle is being tested since April 2010; the test will continue for three years.
- Warsaw, Poland, 4 Solaris hybrid (combustion-electric) buses
- Luxemburg (Sales-Lentz, Emile Weber and AVL)
- Belgium / Flanders (De Lijn)
- Belgium / Wallonia (TEC): 90 Volvo 7900H (plug-in hybrid) + 208 solaris (combustion-electric) ordered in 2016Q4

=== Other countries ===
Egypt IMUT: http://www.i-mut.net/en/about-us.

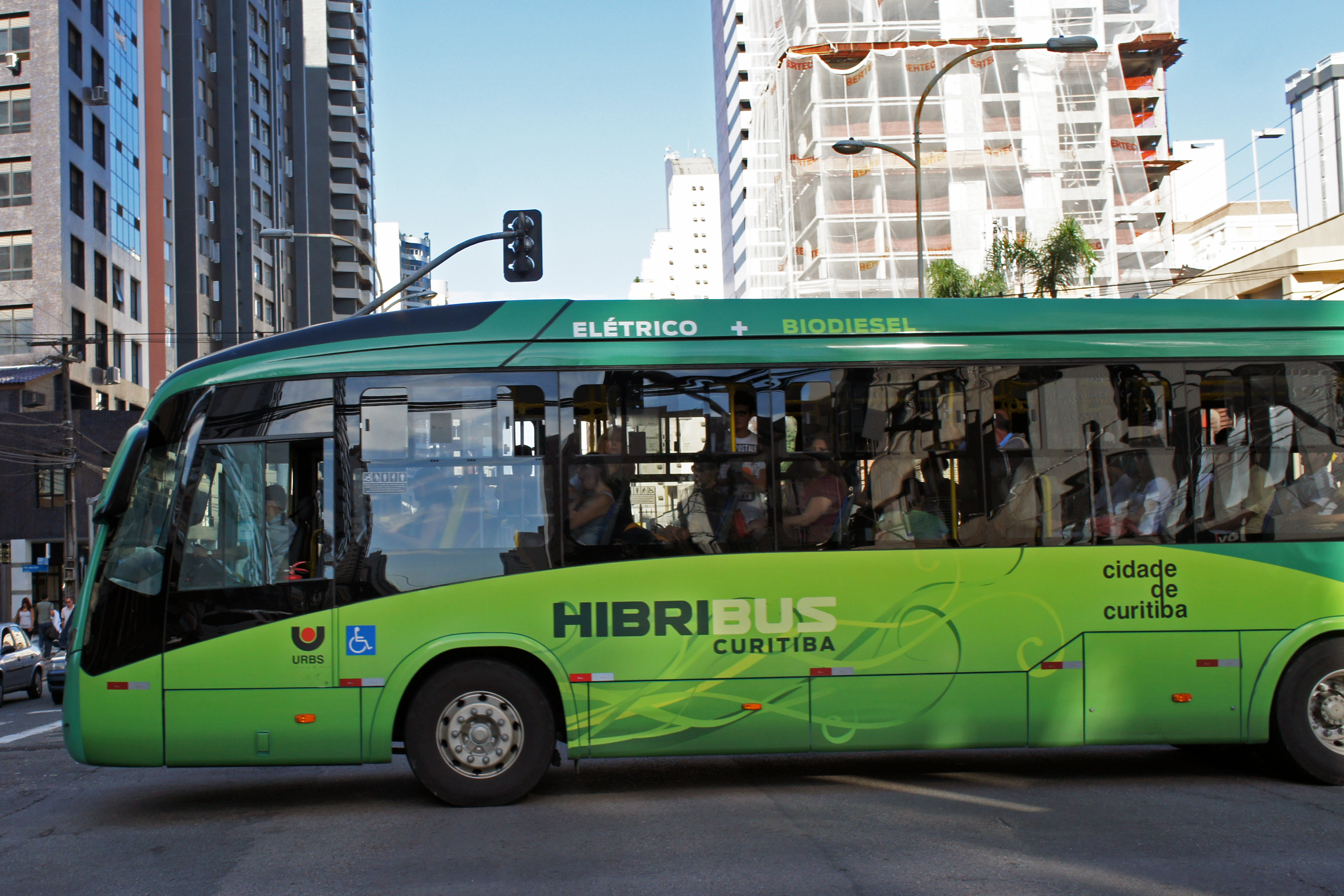
Hybrid biodiesel–electric buses provide feeder services in some routes of Curitiba's Rede Integrada de Transporte, Brazil.

- Buenos Aires, Argentina
- Christchurch, New Zealand
- Curitiba, Brazil
- Mexico City, Mexico (Metrobús Line 4)
- Bogotá, Colombia
- Montevideo, Uruguay

== See also ==
- Battery electric bus
- Diesel electric
- Electric bus
- Electric-vehicle battery
- Global Hybrid Cooperation
- List of buses
- Solar bus
- Trolleybus
