= Citibus (Lubbock) =

Public transportation system in Texas, US

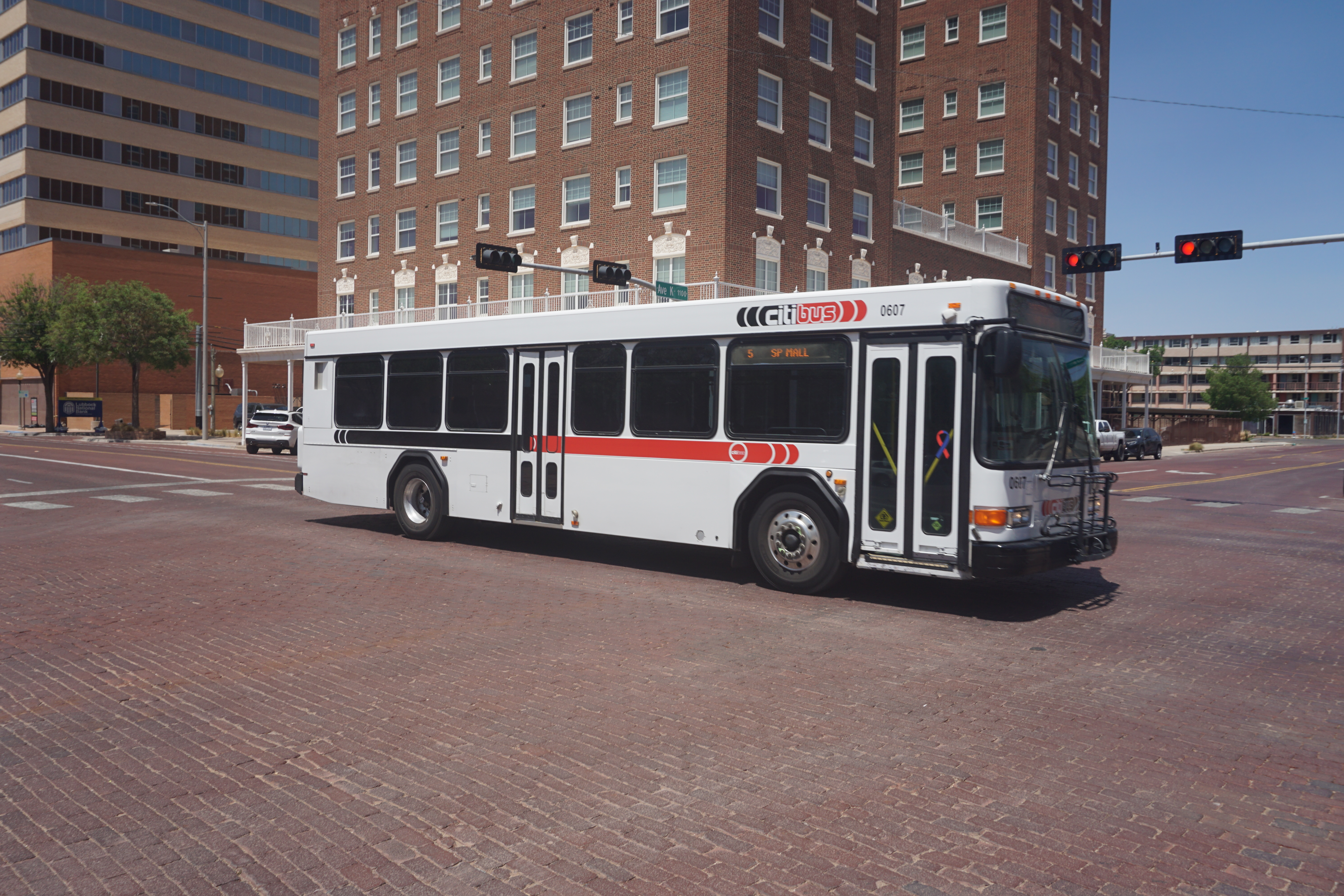
- A Citibus bus in 2022
- Founded: 1932
- Headquarters: 801 Texas Avenue
- Locale: Lubbock, Texas
- Service type: Bus and paratransit
- Routes: 9 City, 8 Texas Tech University campus
- Hubs: Downtown Transfer Plaza
- Daily ridership: 6,800 (weekdays, Q2 2025)
- Annual ridership: 2,664,400 (2024)
- Fuel type: Diesel, Diesel-electric hybrid
- Operator: RATP Dev
- General Manager: Chris Mandrell
- Website: citibus.com

Citibus is the public transportation bus and paratransit system which serves Lubbock, Texas. It runs bus routes throughout the city, with the main routes converging at the Downtown Transfer Plaza, which also houses the Greyhound bus terminal. Citibus has been in continual service since 1971 when the city of Lubbock took over public transit operations. The paratransit system is called Citiaccess.

In 2024, the system had a ridership of 2,664,400, or about 6,800 per weekday as of the second quarter of 2025. Citibus operates six days a week from 5:30 a.m. to 8:00 p.m. Monday through Saturday. Nighttime service is supplemented by a curb-to-curb service called the NiteRide. In addition to regular bus routes, it has a partnership with Texas Tech University to run shuttle buses on school days and game-day events.

== History ==
Citibus was created in 1971. In 2024, the Lubbock City Council approved a system redesign.

== Routes ==
=== City ===
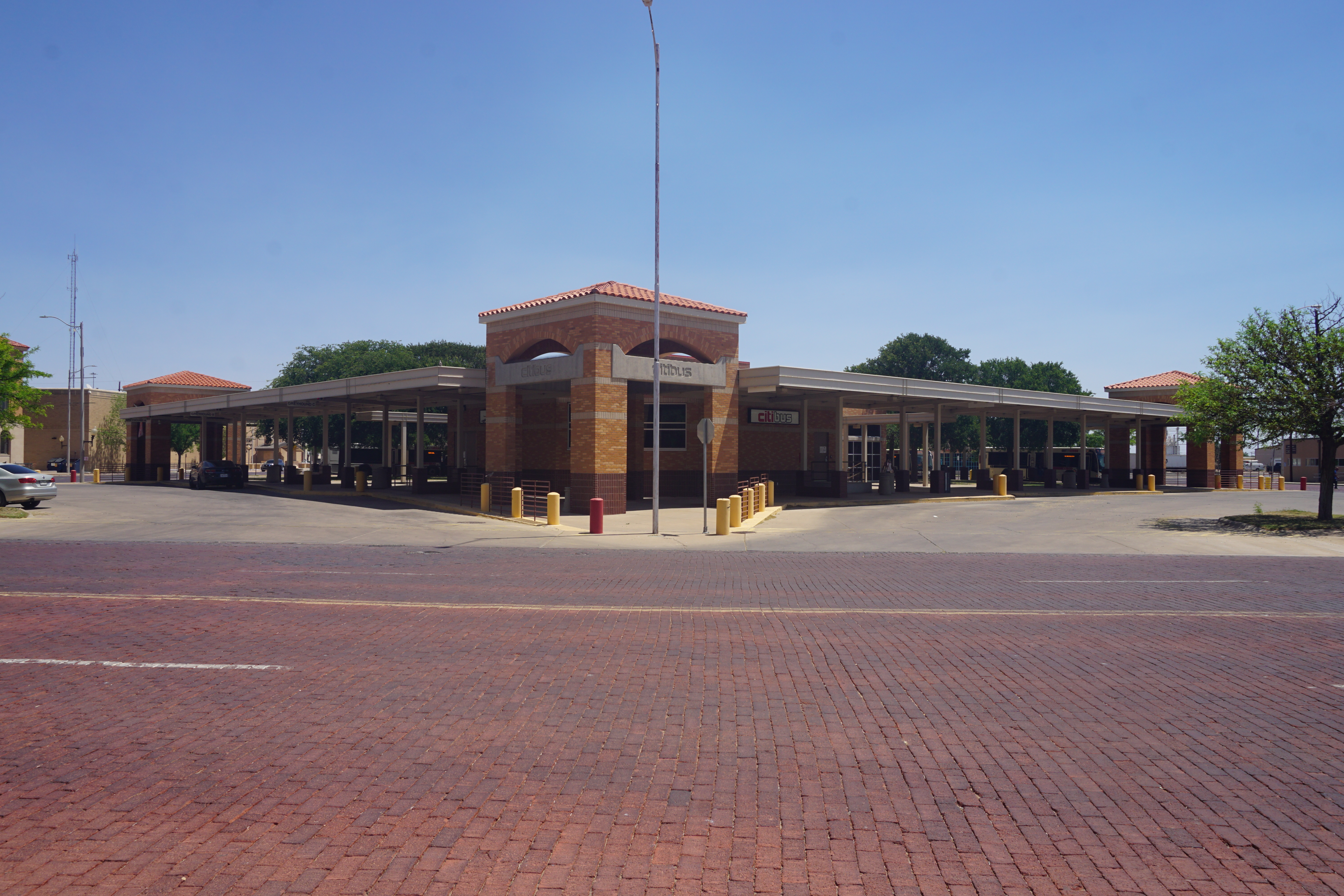
The Citibus Downtown Plaza

- Route 1 – Dunbar Area
- Route 2 – East Broadway
- Route 5 – Boston/S. Quaker/South Plains Mall (named Boston/S. Quaker until changes in Fall 2006)
- Route 6 – Buddy Holly/50th St. Crosstown (named Ave. H/50th St. Crosstown until changes in Fall 2006)
- Route 9 – Ave. Q/S. University/S. Quaker (named Ave. Q/S. University until changes in Fall 2006; then renamed Ave. Q/S. University/Wal-Mart; and to current name in late 2007)
- Route 12 – Arnett Benson/4th St.
- Route 14 – Cherry Point
- Route 19 – Wayland Plaza/South Plains Mall
- Route 34 – 34th St./South Plains Mall

=== Campus ===
- Route 41 – Double T
- Route 42 – Red Raider
- Route 43 – Masked Rider
- Route 44 – North Overton Park
- Route 45 – South Overton Park
- Route 46 – Northwest
- Route 47 – North 4th
- Route 48 – North Indiana
- Route 49 – Tech Terrace
- Route 50 – West 4th Express

== Fleet ==
In 2025, Citibus introduced fifteen new diesel-electric hybrid buses that were purchased through a $39.6 million grant from the FTA. The grant will allow Citibus to purchase 48 buses in total.
