= Arcata Transit Center =

Bus station in Arcata, California

General information
- Location: 925 E Street, Arcata, California
- Coordinates: 40.86865°N 124.08383°W

Other information
- Station code: Amtrak: ARC
Location

The Arcata Transit Center (Arcata Intermodal Transportation Facility) is a bus station in Arcata, California. It is located at 925 E Street, between 9th and 10th Streets. The station is served by several operators in the Humboldt Transit Authority system, as well as by Amtrak Thruway and Greyhound Lines intercity bus service.
