= Redwood Transit System =

Transit service in Humboldt County, California

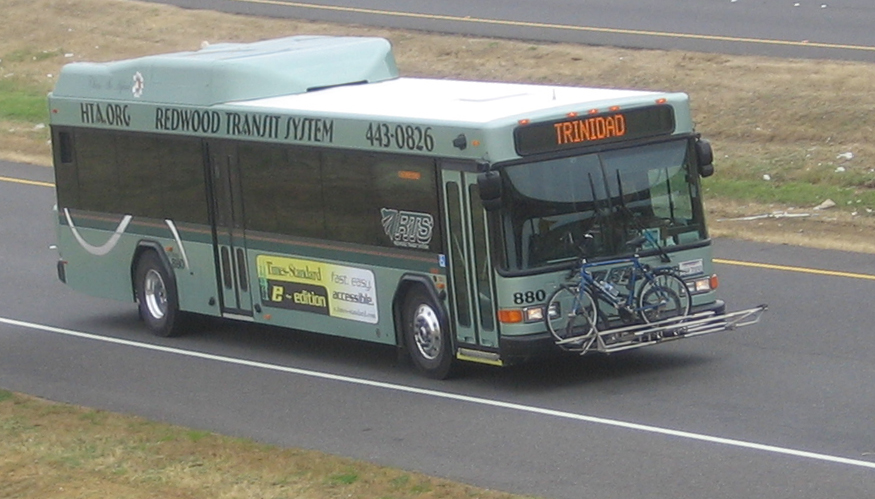
- An RTS Gillig hybrid bus on US 101
- Headquarters: 133 V Street, Eureka CA
- Locale: Humboldt County, CA
- Service type: Bus
- Routes: 1
- Stops: 47
- Daily ridership: 600,000/year
- Chief executive: Greg Pratt
- Website: http://www.redwoodtransit.org/

The Redwood Transit System is a commuter transit service administered by Humboldt Transit Authority that operates Monday-Saturday on the Highway 101 corridor between Trinidad and Scotia in Humboldt County, California. The Redwood Transit System serves the communities of Scotia, Rio Dell, Fortuna, Fields Landing, King Salmon, Eureka, Arcata, Mckinleyville, Westhaven, and Trinidad. RTS provides more than 600,000 passenger-trips per year.

== Fleet ==
RTS operates a fleet of Gillig Phantoms and hybrid Low Floors. The Humboldt Transit Authority (HTA) has been awarded a $38.7M grant from the California State Transportation Agency’s Transit and Intercity Rail Capital Program in 2022 that will launch HTA’s transition to a zero-emission fleet. Coming soon to HTA are 11 New Flyer fuel cell electric buses (FCEBs) and a hydrogen fueling station at HTA’s facility in Eureka. HTA worked closely with transit bus manufacturer New Flyer to develop specifications for a next-generation model of their Xcelsior Charge H2TM. HTA will be replacing the entire fleet of the Redwood Transit system with these new buses.
