= Kinetic sculpture race =

Human-powered art vehicle contest

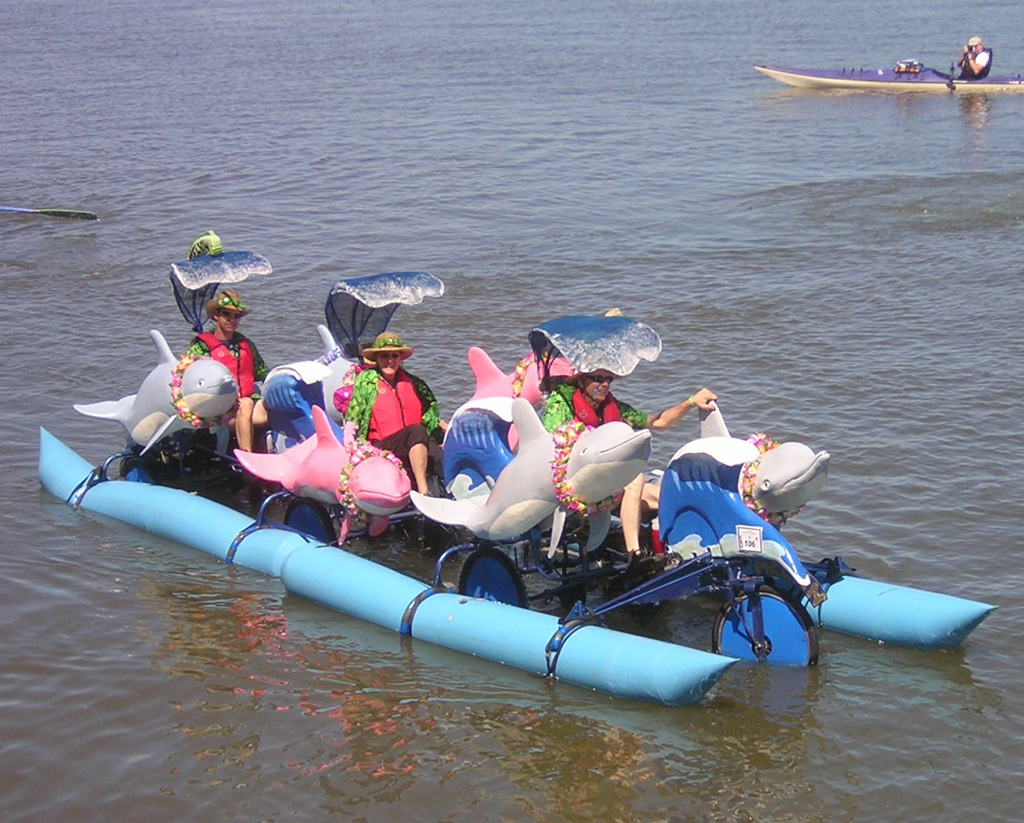
Team Melvin crosses Humboldt Bay during the 2010 Kinetic Grand Championship

Kinetic sculpture races are organized contests of human-powered amphibious all-terrain works of art. The original cross country event, the World Championship Great Arcata To Ferndale Cross Country Kinetic Sculpture Race, now known as the Kinetic Grand Championship in Humboldt County, California, is also called the "Triathlon of the Art World" because art and engineering are combined with physical endurance during a three-day cross country race that includes sand, mud, pavement, a bay crossing, a river crossing and major hills.

== Race locations ==
Kinetic sculpture races are held in many locations:

- Humboldt County, California hosts the annual Kinetic Grand Championship each May over Memorial Day weekend. It spans 42 miles (68 km) over three days.
- Baltimore, Maryland – the East Coast Championship sponsored by the American Visionary Art Museum covers 15 miles (24 km) through downtown Baltimore and the harbor.
- Gainesville, Florida – the Menagerie in Motion Kinetic Derby in 2016 became the Southeast's first and only kinetic sculpture derby. The event occurs annually on the last weekend in February to coincide with Chimera Fest.
- Lowell, Massachusetts – New England's, Lowell Kinetic Sculpture Race, through the streets of Lowell, a giant mud pit and navigating the Merrimack River. The third weekend of September.
- Port Townsend, Washington
- Corvallis, Oregon – as part of Da Vinci Days festival.
- Ventura, California – benefits the Turning Point Foundation.
- Klamath Falls, Oregon The race is held the last full weekend in June.
- Philadelphia, Pennsylvania hosts a kinetic sculpture derby as part of the Trenton Avenue arts festival in the neighborhood of Kensington, Philadelphia, Pennsylvania.
- Coeur d' Alene, Idaho – Gizmotion Celebration of Creativity

There are other kinetic challenges, derbies and so on which follow some of the rules and traditions of kinetic sculpture racing, but are not an official part of it.

Races were formerly held in Poland; Geraldton, Western Australia; Clearlake, California; and Prescott Valley, Arizona.

=== World Championship ===
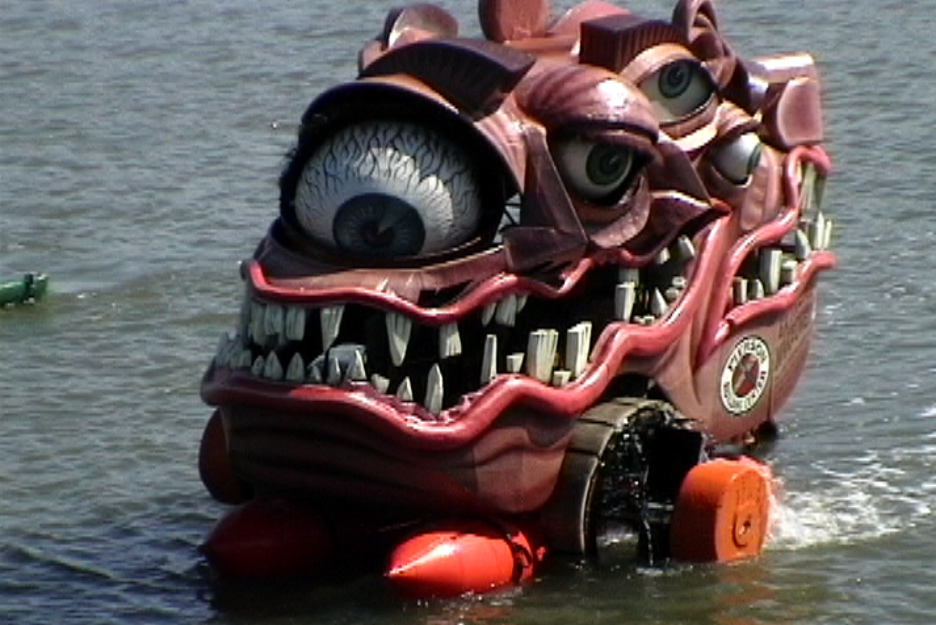
Duane Flatmo's Extreme Makeover crosses Humboldt Bay during the 2005 Grand Championship

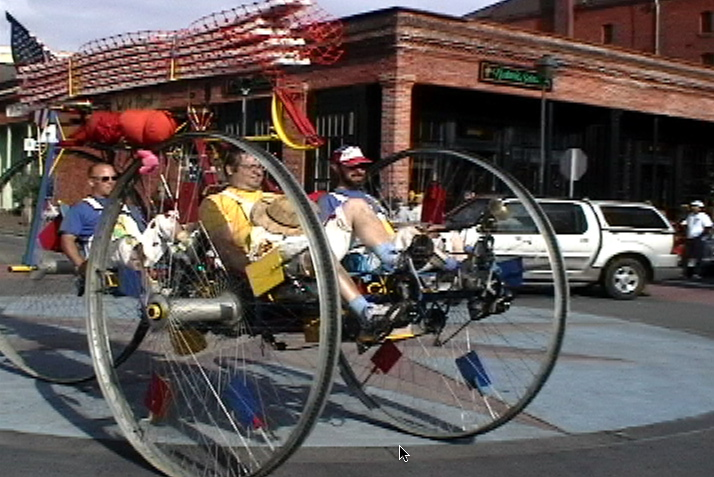
Wet Paint enters Old Town Eureka

The concept of kinetic sculpture racing originated in Ferndale, California in 1969 when local sculptor Hobart Brown "improved" the appearance of his son's tricycle by welding on two additional wheels and other embellishments. Seeing this "Pentacycle," fellow artist Jack Mays challenged him to a race. Others later joined in creating a field of twelve machines that inaugurated the first race down Ferndale's Main Street during the town's annual art festival. Neither Brown nor Mays won; instead, the first winner was Bob Brown of Eureka, California whose sculpture was a smoke-emitting Turtle that laid eggs. The race received broad publicity when photos of Congressman Don Clausen riding the Pentacycle were seen nationally.

The event was repeated in 1970, and the course subsequently expanded to include cross-country terrain. When affiliated races were initiated in other cities and the course grew, the Ferndale event became the World Championship, and has become the largest single event in Humboldt County.

During the 1970s, the race adopted its present three-day, cross-country format and became the "Triathlon of the Art World." Machines tackled mud, sand, water, gravel and pavement. Stan Bennett's book Crazy Contraptions chronicles the first five years of the race. In the early 1980s, Brown was referred to as the "Glorious Founder of the Kinetic Race" in a spectators' brochure.

As the 1980s ended, a mineral water company began sponsoring the race, which adopted a family-friendly approach. Soon after, a local manufacturer of sports racks and car storage boxes became interested in the race. The sponsors' financial support – especially the creation of the Kinetic Lab in Arcata – took the race to a new level of art and engineering. The Lab's 92 feet (28 m) long sculpture Yakima KingFish was the longest ever raced according to its creator.

During the 1990s, the race matured. Many contestants were younger than the race, having grown up with its philosophy, "Adults having fun so children will want to grow older," coined by Brown. As age and crippling arthritis limited his activities, he sold the race rights, the kinetic chicken logo and the trademark "For the Glory" slogan to a new not-for-profit agency called the Humboldt Kinetic Association in 2002.

Changing economics caused the sport rack company to leave the area and the water company to end their sponsorship. With no major sponsor and several years of county budget cutbacks reflecting statewide budget problems, the race experienced difficulties. In early 2007, Humboldt Kinetic Association abjured responsibility for the race. Race volunteers rapidly created Kinetic Universe, a new not-for-profit, to manage the 2007 race. It was at this time that the races title was changed to Kinetic Grand Championship. In 2009, the New Belgium Brewing Company became a sponsor. In 2013, the annual Mother's Day Kinetic Klassic children's event moved from Ferndale to Eureka's waterfront Halverson Park.

In 2014, the World Championship race course covered 42 miles (68 km), crossing a series of sand dunes, Humboldt Bay and the Eel River. The race began on Arcata Plaza with the Saturday noon whistle; the race goes through Eureka and Loleta before reaching the finish line on the third day on Main Street in Ferndale. The race is broadcast live on local radio station KHUM.

=== East Coast Championship in Baltimore ===
The 2011 Grand Mediocre East Coast Champion was Platypus. Built by David Hess, the two-ton sculpture is powered on land and water by 8 pilots, with an additional driver steering it along the 15-mile racecourse. Here, it races through Baltimore's Fell's Point neighborhood.

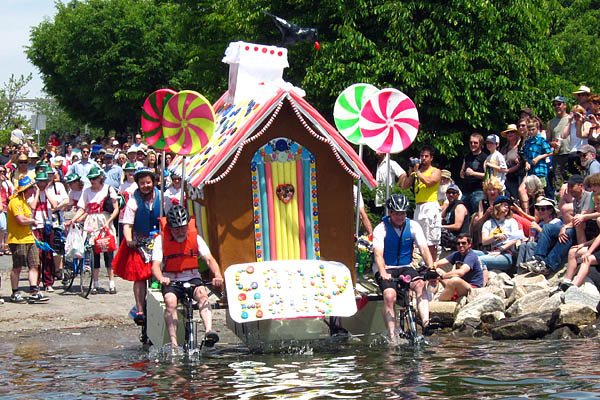
Candy Haus won the 2010 East Coast Championship; here it enters the Baltimore Harbor at Canton.

In 1999, the American Visionary Art Museum (AVAM) in Baltimore worked with Hobart Brown to start the first race in the Eastern United States, and has sponsored the race every year since. On 4 May 2019, 22 teams brought 25 sculptures to Baltimore for the 21st East Coast Championship. With the 2020 race postponed due to the COVID-19 pandemic, the next race was scheduled Saturday, 1 May 2021. However, the 2021 edition was held as a "mini-race" owing to social distancing guidelines. Twenty teams participated in the 22nd East Coast Championship on Saturday, 7 May 2022.

In contrast to the rural flair of Humboldt County, the Baltimore race spans the city's urban center and is completed in a single day. The 15 miles (24 km) race begins with morning opening ceremonies and the Le Mans Start down Federal Hill to AVAM on the south side of the Inner Harbor, continues past well-known sites including the Maryland Science Center, Harborplace, the USS Constellation, the National Aquarium, and Fells Point, enters the water at Canton, continues with sand and mud challenges at Patterson Park, then through Butchers Hill and downtown to the finish line at AVAM in mid- to late-afternoon. An awards ceremony at AVAM concludes the event.

In 2002, Baltimore's race included a loop around the Patterson Park ice skating rink, a challenging extension of the all-terrain aspect. However, in the years since then the race occurs later in the spring to benefit from warmer weather – after the rink closes for the season.

== Rutabaga Queens and other numeraries ==
Early in the history of the Championship, contestants began to select an annual Rutabaga Queen. with active Queens Pigtunia Swineheart (83/84), Queen Denise Ryles 2001, Queen Mo "Mo Betta" Burke 2002, Queen Mair "Jane Doe" Dodd 2003, Queen Monica Topping 2004, Queen Shaye "Flamebouyant Femme Fatale" Harty 2005, Queen Harmony "Foxy Biloxi" Groves 2006, Queen Emma "Emma the Emchantress" Breacain 2007, Queen Kati "Lotta Paintbuckets" Texas 2008, Queen Jermaine "Jermajesty" Brubaker 2009, Queen Jennifer "Dinah Might" Thelander 2010, Queen Natalie Arroyo "G-ma" 2011, and Queen Wendy "Sohotshe" Burns LaRutabaga" 2012.

The 2004, 2005 and 2006 Queens were the founding members of the board of directors of the non-profit entity, Kinetic Universe Inc., created in 2007 to administer the Kinetic Grand Championship, 3-day Arcata to Ferndale Kinetic Sculpture Race, and former queens participate in race administration.

Other Kinetic Races select different botanical Queens, including the Rose-Hips Queen of Port Townsend, Washington. In Australia, having already a queen, the race selects a Goddess to rule over the festivities instead.

== See also ==
- Bog snorkelling – Race thru a peat bog trench
- Cooper's Hill Cheese-Rolling and Wake – Annual event held in Gloucestershire, England
- Idiotarod – Shopping cart race
- Sepak takraw – Southeast Asian team sport
- Shopping cart race – Shopping cart race
  - Carts of Darkness, a documentary about shopping cart racing
- Wife carrying – Sport where men carry women through an obstacle track
- Wok racing – Racing using woks as sleds
- Zoobomb – Weekly bicycling activity in Portland, Oregon, United States
