= Can't Look Away: The Case Against Social Media =

2025 documentary film

- Directed by: Matthew O'Neill; Perri Peltz
- Produced by: Kristin Powers; Anna Casper
- Production companies: DCTV; Bloomberg Originals; Bloomberg Businessweek Films
- Distributed by: Jolt.Film
- Release date: April 4, 2025
- Running time: 75 minutes
- Country: United States
- Language: English

Can't Look Away: The Case Against Social Media is a 2025 documentary film which follows the work of the Social Media Victims Law Center, a group of lawyers assisting the parents of children who died due to interactions with harmful activities on the internet. It was directed by Matthew O'Neill and Perri Peltz.

== Themes ==
A film review in The Guardian describes how social media companies, including Snapchat, repeatedly serve United States teenagers content covering sextortion, suicide scenarios, unwanted sexual advances, and illicit drug networks.

This content is not accidental but rather the result of algorithms that determine the material that teenagers might wish to see based on their search and viewing histories. Moreover, the algorithms are designed to maximize engagement and differ from those applied to adult users, so that parents remain largely unaware of the type of subject matter being promoted to their children. O'Neill explains:

It's so much more than just addiction, or screen time, or wasting time. What young people see is so different because of the algorithms. What they're being fed, what they can't look away from, this is not what they're searching for. Children are essentially entering into a hellscape that adults don't know about.

== Reception ==
=== Accolades ===
Award	Date of ceremony	Category	Recipient(s)	Result	Ref.
Cinema for Peace Awards	16 February 2026	Cinema for Peace Dove for The Most Valuable Documentary of the Year	Can't Look Away: The Case Against Social Media	Pending	
Alfred I. duPont–Columbia University Award	28 January 2026	Silver Baton	Bloomberg News and DCTV	Won	
