= Kosogorsky metallurgical plant =

Kosogorsky Metallurgical Plant
- Formerly: Sudakovsky Metallurgical Plant
- Type: Joint-stock company
- Founded: 1897
- Headquarters: Tula, Kosaya Gora, Orlovskoye Highway, 4
- Key people: Sergey Vladimirovich Kiriev (director)
- Products: high-purity blast furnace pig iron, ferromanganese, industrial and artistic castings
- Number of employees: 1842 (2023)
- Parent: Bonarda Investments Ltd.
- Website: www.kmz-tula.ru

Kosogorsky Metallurgical plant (or Косогорский металлургический завод in Russian, KMZ) is a metallurgical industry enterprise in Tula, Russia producing blast furnace pig iron and ferromanganese, industrial and artistic castings.

== History ==
In October 1895, the "Joint Stock Company of Tula Blast Furnaces" was established in Brussels. Its charter was sent to Saint Petersburg, and Nicholas II "on May 17, 1896, deigned to permit the said company to commence operations in Russia." The site was selected 9 km south of Tula, near the settlement of Kosaya Gora, at the junction of the recently built Moscow-Kursk Railway and the Voronka River. As these lands adjoined the village of Sudakovo, it was initially called "Sudakovsky Metallurgical Plant." The first pig iron smelt took place on May 8, 1897, marking the plant's founding date.

The writer Leo Tolstoy visited Kosaya Gora multiple times during construction, last with his family for the pig iron pour on June 13, 1897. In 1918, after the October Revolution, the plant was nationalized. In 1926, it was renamed "Kosogorsky Metallurgical Plant named after F. E. Dzerzhinsky."

In 1941, due to German occupation, the plant was evacuated to the Ural city of Lysva. Reconstruction and development occurred from 1945 to 1980.

In 1992, it became a joint-stock company. In 2003, natural gas injection systems were installed on blast furnaces No. 1 and No. 3. Ferromanganese smelting technology on BF No. 2 was improved. A comprehensive raw material accounting system was introduced. In 2008, foundry production was modernized. A new crushing-sorting complex for blast furnace waste was launched, producing fractional slag gravel for construction.

In 2009, cooling plate casting technology for blast furnaces was mastered. Nitrogen plant construction was completed for bell-less top charging and dry gas cleaning. In 2009–2010, major overhaul of BF-1 complex with modernization occurred. In 2010, dry gas cleaning construction was completed and commissioned.

As of September 1, 2021, the owner was JSC "Satkinsky Iron Foundry". The sole owner in 2021 was Cypriot offshore "Bonarda Investments Ltd."

== Description ==
Kosogorsky Metallurgical Plant specializes in high-purity nodular and foundry pig iron for high-precision castings, ferromanganese FMn78 for special steels. Most nodular pig irons are exported abroad. It also produces industrial and art casting. The plant produces crushed slag gravel in road fractions 5-20, 20-40, 40-70 mm for regional road construction.

The plant has 3 blast furnaces: BF No. 1 (1,066 m³ hearth diameter 7.2 m); BF No. 2 (462 m³, 4.9 m); BF No. 3 (740 m³, 6.0 m), unique in Russia for alternating pig iron and ferromanganese on one furnace. It includes a foundry shop. Casting weights: gray iron SCh10-SCh30 0.1-12,000 kg, carbon and low-alloy steels 1-1,800 kg.

BF No. 1 operated from 1982 without modernization until stopped in 2006 by Federal Service for Ecological, Technological, and Atomic Supervision due to wear. It resumed in 2010 after reconstruction for higher productivity, reduced emissions, and better labor conditions. BF No. 1 stopped again in June 2016 for overhaul.

Currently, BF No. 2 smelts ferromanganese. From January to August 2021, BF No. 3 produced foundry and converter pig irons; August 27 to November 5, 2021, ferromanganese; from November 6, 2021, foundry and converter pig irons.

Auxiliary production includes foundry shop, secondary materials processing, and TETS-PVS (cogeneration plant). Foundry remelts ferromanganese screenings, produces industrial/art castings, monuments, fences, benches including custom. Secondary processing turns blast furnace waste (slags, dust, slurries) into building materials: undressed slag, fractional gravel. TETS-PVS generates heat, power, blast air, process steam; sole heat source for Kosaya Gora and south Tula (~1 mln Gcal/year), fully powers the plant.

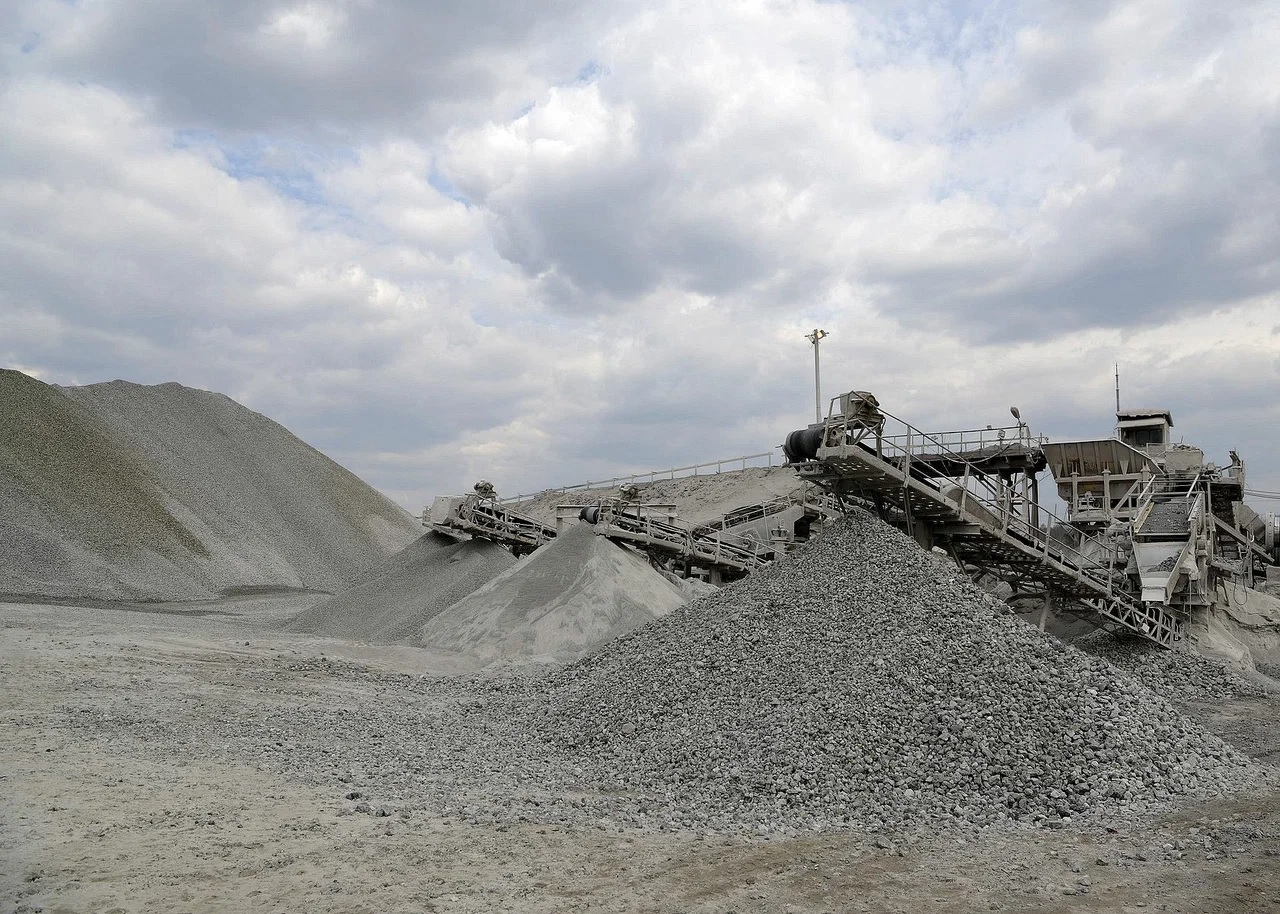
Ferromanganese production

== Performance Results ==
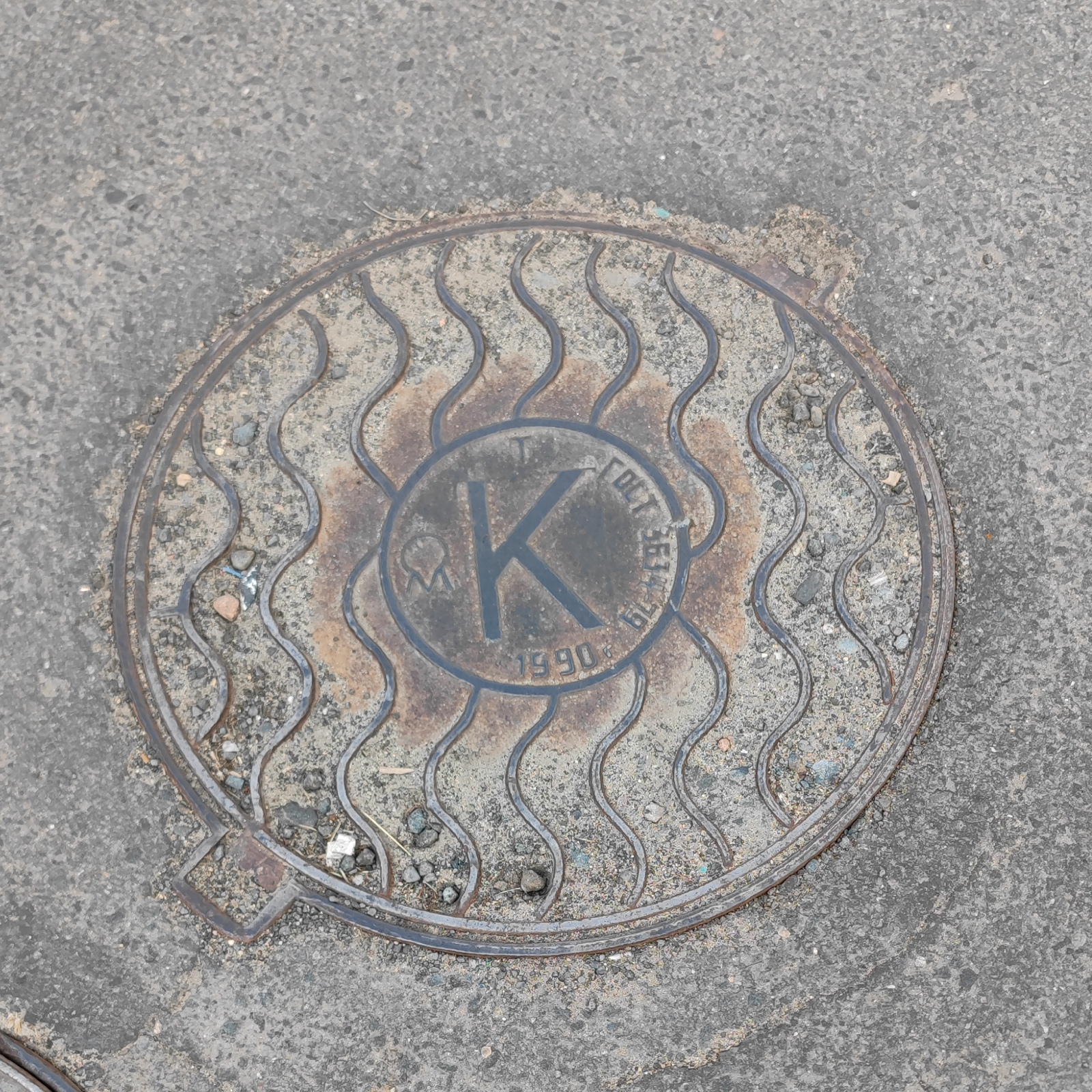
KMZ-produced cast iron manhole cover

In 2021, Kosogorsky Metallurgical Plant ranked second after Tulachermet in merchant pig iron shipments to Russia, Belarus, and CIS markets, with 15.5% share. Ferromanganese production was 88.2 thousand tons, up 23.7 thousand tons from 2020. 62.8 thousand tons shipped to Russia/CIS.

2021 main products:

- Pig iron — 269.38 thousand t (82.33 thousand t foundry, 187.05 thousand t converter), down 22% from 2020; 24% high-quality nodular/semi-nodular.
- Ferromanganese — 84.33 thousand t, up 36.9%; 83.22 thousand t FMn-78.

Main products revenue: 12,415.3 mln rub, up 192.03 mln rub. Non-core/nonsaleable: 454.6 mln rub, up 60.03 mln rub. Net profit: 1,343.5 mln rub Profitability 5.5%. No 2020 dividends paid.

== Social Projects and Charity ==
Charity is integral to social policy: aid to healthcare, schools, sports, low-income families, plant veterans, Great Patriotic War veterans. Participates in Tula region ecology/tourism: Raspberry Grove, Mosolovs Estate-Museum in Dubna district. Maintains war memorials in Kosaya Gora squares.

== Environmental Impact ==
Plant activities pollute air/soil, including copper compounds in Tula's Central and Privokzalny districts. Sanitary zone soils high in iron (45,750 mg/kg), exceeding manganese (4.4x), zinc (88%), lead (55%).

No radiation/chemical hazards, but risks: blast furnace shop (fire up to 500 m²), gas shop (50 m²), cogeneration substation (300 m²), foundry (100 m²), rail shop (150 m²). Rare explosions during startups/stops, hearth breaks, wear/misoperation.

Complaints on "fox tails" prompted inspections. Voronka River ponds polluted. 2022 samples showed excess pollutants; fined 200,000 rub for Voronka wastewater discharge. Orange emissions called normal, from BF blow-ins.

Plant reduces impact via modernization, waste recycling. BF-1 overhaul (2008–2010) added aspiration (dust capture from 4-6 t/h to 400 t/h). 2011–2016: recycled 58 thousand t dust. 2016: wastewater bio-treatment repairs cut ammonia 15%, nitrites 10%. Foundry switched to cold-setting mixes 2013, eliminated phenol/formaldehyde. Crusher processed 1.5 mln t slag 2011–2016.

== Plant in public media ==
Kosogorsky Metallurgical Plant and Kosaya Gora often film locations. 2008: "Lyubka" miniseries by Dina Rubina.

"Miracle" by Alexander Proshkin with Sergey Makovetsky, Konstantin Khabensky shot in Tula region.

2011: Proshkin shot "Redemption" («August and Alexandra») by Friedrich Gorenstein postwar scenes on plant, Tula center, mine spoil heap.

Plant backgrounds in "Mir! Druzhba! Zhvachka!" series episodes.
