= KXGO =

KXGO may refer to:

- KXGO (FM), a radio station (99.5 FM) licensed to serve Willow Creek, California, United States
- KLGE, a radio station (94.1 FM) licensed to serve Hydesville, California, which held the call sign KXGO from 2014 to 2017
- KSLG-FM, a radio station (93.1 FM) licensed to serve Arcata, California, which held the call sign KXGO from 1972 to 2014
- KVLY-TV, a television station in Fargo, North Dakota, which held the call sign KXGO-TV from 1959 to 1963
