= KHUM =

- Cutten, California; United States
- Broadcast area: Eureka, California; Humboldt County, California
- Frequency: 104.7 MHz
- Branding: K-HUM

Programming
- Format: Freeform

Ownership
- Owner: Lost Coast Communications, Inc.
- Sister stations: KSLG-FM, KWPT, KLGE

History
- First air date: January 7, 1996
- Former call signs: KBEY (1990–1995)
- Call sign meaning: Humboldt County

Technical information
- Licensing authority: FCC
- Facility ID: 33653
- Class: C1
- ERP: 24,500 watts
- HAAT: 504.9 meters (1,656 ft)
- Transmitter coordinates: 40°43′36.0″N 123°58′18.0″W

Links
- Public license information: Public file; LMS
- Webcast: Listen live
- Website: www.khum.com

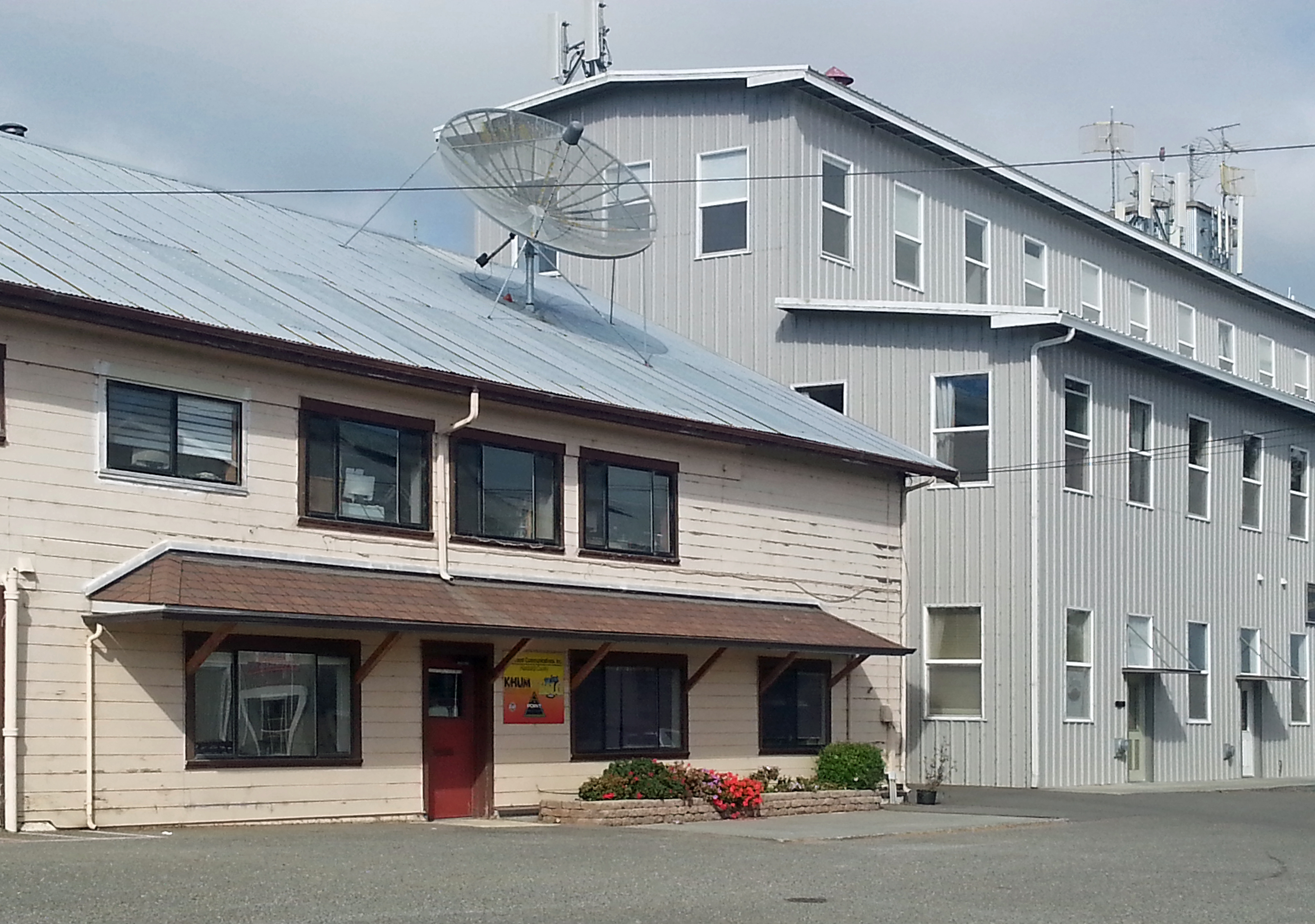
KHUM's former studios in Ferndale, California. (left)

KHUM is a commercial Freeform broadcast radio station licensed to Cutten, California, serving Eureka and Humboldt County in California. KHUM is owned and operated by Lost Coast Communications, Inc.

KHUM simulcasts on translator K282AD, broadcasting at 104.3 FM. The translator is located in the hills above Ferndale, California. The station's studios (along with those of KHUM's sister stations) are located in Eureka, CA.

== History and operations ==
Founded by Jacqueline Debets and Cliff Berkowitz, KHUM signed on January 7, 1996. Patrick Cleary (along with his family) is KHUM's majority owner.

== Programming ==
The current weekday lineup consists of Toby "in the morning" (6am-12pm, Pacific), and Jordan in the afternoon (12pm-6pm, Pacific). Gus Mozart, DJ Goldylocks, and Chas Lewis also heard on KHUM.

Past air staff include Larry Trask, Cliff Berkowitz, Bayley Brown, Lyndsey Battle, Cam Trujillo, Lila Nelson, Emily McLongstreet, Michael Moore, Pam Long, Matt Brunner, Gary Franklin, Jess McGuinty, Ryan Lee and Mike Dronkers. Air staff also included "Digital" Dan Lawrence, who lost part of his throat to cancer and used a computer voice simulator during his two radio programs.

Each year, KHUM undertakes a local Stop The Violence campaign, which includes three weeks of drive-time interviews with experts in and survivors of domestic abuse, street violence, and systemic violence. KHUM maintains a Stop The Violence Fund at a local foundation, and annual donations are made to local charities.

KHUM has broadcast live coverage of the annual world championship Kinetic Sculpture Race, which was founded in Ferndale and runs down Main Street past their studio.

== Awards ==
KHUM has won numerous national awards for production and programming, including an Edward R. Murrow Award from the Radio-Television News Director Association for its broadcast series, Picking Up: Meth on the North Coast, an NAB Crystal Radio Award for public service on June 12, 2006, as well as several awards for commercial writing and production. In 2006, KHUM was awarded the "Friend in Need Award" by the National Association of Broadcasters for keeping the "community safe and informed" after a large storm left three quarters of Humboldt County without power.

== Translator ==
In addition to the main station, KHUM is relayed by an FM translator to widen its broadcast area.

Call sign	Frequency	City of license	FID	ERP (W)	HAAT	Class	FCC info
K282AD	(104.3 FM) FM	Ferndale, California	33652	250 watts	509.5 m (1,672 ft)	D	LMS
