= Perri Peltz =

American film producer

Perri Peltz is an Emmy award winning documentary filmmaker, journalist, and public health advocate. Most recently, Perri directed “She Runs The World," a 2025 Tribeca Festival official selection, “The Last Twins,” in select theaters, “Can’t Look Away” for Bloomberg Originals and “Surveilled” with Ronan Farrow for HBO with Matthew O’Neill. Perri and Matt also created the Emmy® winning documentary news series “AXIOS on HBO,” and directed and produced the 2019 HBO Documentary, “Alternate Endings: Six New Ways to Die in America.” Previously, Perri directed the HBO documentaries, “Warning: This Drug May Kill You,” about the opioid addiction epidemic and “Risky Drinking,” about alcohol use disorder. She co-directed “A Conversation About Growing Up Black” as part of the “Conversation on Race” series for The New York Times Op-Docs, and other films include HBO’s “Remembering the Artist: Robert De Niro, Sr.” and “Prison Dogs.” Perri hosts “The Perri Peltz Show” on SiriusXM Radio and has a Doctorate in Public Health from Columbia University. She was previously an award-winning broadcast journalist for NBC, ABC, and CNN.

== Career ==
Peltz worked at WNBC from 1987 to 1996 where she co-anchored Weekend Today in New York with Ken Taylor, and weekend editions of News 4 New York at 6 and 11 with Ralph Penza.

Peltz joined Dateline NBC for two years. During that period, she often anchored live news coverage on NBC's 24-hour cable news television channel MSNBC.

She then worked for ABC's 20/20 for two years until she moved to CNN where she stayed until 2002.

Peltz left CNN to produce a feature film, Knights of the South Bronx starring Ted Danson. The film was based on the real-life story of a middle school chess team from the South Bronx that became national chess champions. The film aired on the A&E Network.

Peltz then went to work for the Robin Hood Foundation in New York City. Robin Hood is a non-profit organization dedicated to fighting poverty. While at Robin Hood, Peltz wanted to tell the stories of the people who were working on the front lines in the war against poverty.

In 2005 she rejoined WNBC after a nine-year absence to co-anchor Live at Five with Sue Simmons. She returned to WNBC to report on those people and the differences they were making. She also anchored Live at Five with Sue Simmons from 31 May 2005, until 12 March 2007, when she began hosting her own half-hour lifestyle broadcast titled News 4 You. The program was part of WNBC's attempt to boost ratings and features stories from the consumer, health and entertainment worlds.

On 10 September 2007, WNBC cancelled News 4 You. Peltz continued to report both for WNBC and for NBC Network on people who were making a difference.

Peltz co-produced and co-directed the documentary Prison Dogs, which premiered at the 2016 Tribeca Film Festival.

In 2025, Peltz and Matthew O'Neill directed the film Can't Look Away: The Case Against Social Media.

== Education ==
Peltz graduated from The Dalton School in New York City, and then went to Brown University and then to Columbia for a Masters in Public Health. In 2008, she left WNBC to attend medical school.
