= Cuba and the Cameraman =

- Film Poster
- Directed by: Jon Alpert
- Written by: Jon Alpert
- Produced by: Jon Alpert; Matthew O'Neill; Tessa Treadway
- Cinematography: Jon Alpert
- Edited by: David Meneses
- Music by: Daniel Freiberg
- Distributed by: Netflix
- Release dates: September 7, 2017 (Venice Film Festival); November 24, 2017 (Netflix)
- Running time: 114 minutes
- Country: United States
- Languages: English; Spanish

Cuba and the Cameraman is a 2017 American documentary film written, directed and co-produced by Jon Alpert. The film is a Netflix Original and was first shown at the 74th Venice International Film Festival.

== Synopsis ==
The film shows Cuba over a course of 45 years through the lens of Jon Alpert.

== Production ==
Alpert started visiting Cuba in the 70's. After founding the Downtown Community Television Center, he became increasingly interested in Cuba's policies. He said: "We heard that Fidel Castro was implementing the social programs that we were fighting for here in New York”. The film was edited from over 1,000 hours of footage, Alpert filmed since the first time he visited Cuba.

== Reception ==
On review aggregator Rotten Tomatoes, the film has an approval rating of 100% based on 8 reviews, with an average rating of 7.7/10. Metacritic, which uses a weighted average, assigned a score of 82 out of 100, based on 5 critics, indicating "Universal acclaim". Glenn Kenny from The New York Times wrote: "In part because of its political blind spots, “Cuba and the Cameraman” is captivating. (Whatever you think of Mr. Alpert’s perspective, it’s interesting.) But it’s mostly worth watching because of human stories like these."

David Ehrlich from IndieWire gave the film a B+ and stated: "If only Alpert had been a bit less genial, if only he had dug a little deeper — if only he had either taken himself out of the equation, or gone the other way and been much more introspective about his complicated feelings about Castro — then “Cuba and the Cameraman” could have been more than just a window into a foreign world. But windows are important; without them, we’d never be able to see through our walls. And this is as clear and wide a window as you’re ever likely to find."

Sheri Linden from the Los Angeles Times said about the film: "As a decades-long, ground-level portrait of the country, his vibrant film is unprecedented." Neil Young from The Hollywood Reporter wrote: "A work of old-school humanism that hovers between pro-Revolutionary fervor and a more objective documentary stance, Cuba and the Cameraman is sustained by the strong bonds of trust which the gregarious Alpert has evidently been able to maintain with Cubans from various echelons of this theoretically classless society."
