= KSLG =

KSLG may refer to:

- Smith Field (Arkansas) (ICAO code KSLG)
- KSLG-FM, a radio station (93.1 FM) licensed to serve Arcata, California, United States
- KLGE, a radio station (94.1 FM) licensed to serve Hydesville, California, which held the call sign KSLG-FM from 2001 to 2014
- KXFN, a radio station (1380 AM) licensed to serve St. Louis, Missouri, United States, which held the call sign KSLG from 1999 to 2012
