= Wife-carrying =

Sport where men carry women through an obstacle track

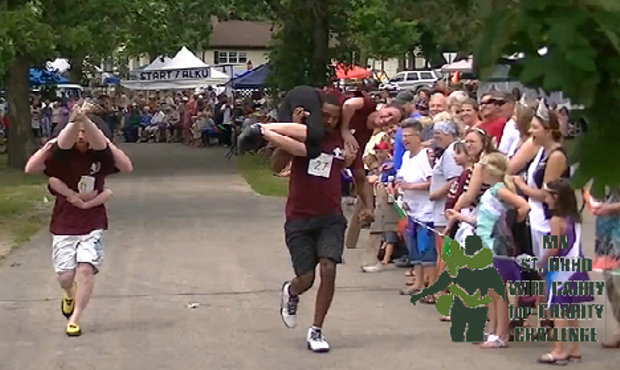
A wife-carrying competition in Menahga, Minnesota

Wife carrying (Finnish: eukonkanto or akankanto, Swedish: kärringkånk or kärringbärning) is a contest in which competitors race while each carrying a partner. While most teams consist of a man carrying a woman, there are generally no rules about gender or marital status. The objective is for the runner to carry their team‑mate through a route in the fastest time. The sport was first introduced in 1992 in Sonkajärvi, Finland.

Several types of carrying may be practiced: a classic piggyback, a fireman's carry (over the shoulder), or the Estonian‑style (the 'wife' upside‑down on the carrier's back, with her legs over their neck and shoulders).

== History ==
Eukonkanto originated in Finland. Tales have been passed down of a man named Herkko Rosvo‑Ronkainen (also known as Ronkainen the Robber). This man was thought to be a robber in the late 1800s who lived in a forest. He supposedly ran around with his gang of thieves causing harm to villagers. From what has been found, there are three ideas as to why and how this sport was invented. Firstly, that Rosvo‑Ronkainen and his thieves were accused of stealing food and abducting women from villages in the area where he lived, then carrying these women on their backs as they ran away (hence the 'wife' or woman carrying). The second suggestion is that young men would go to neighboring villages and abduct women to forcibly marry, often women who were already married. These wives were also carried on the backs of the young men; this was referred to as 'the practice of wife stealing'. Lastly, there is the idea that Rosvo‑Ronkainen trained his thieves to be "faster and stronger" by carrying big, heavy sacks on their backs, from which this sport evolved. Though the sport is often considered a joke, competitors take it very seriously, just like any other sport.

Wife‑carrying contests have taken place in Australia, the United States, Hong Kong, India, Germany, the UK, and other parts of the world besides Finland and nearby Sweden, Estonia, and Latvia, and the sport has a category in the Guinness Book of Records.

== World champions ==
Wife Carrying World Champions (1996–2026)
Year	Carrier	Carried	Country	Time
2026	Taisto Miettinen	Katja Kovanen	Finland	1:04.4
2025	Caleb Roesler	Justine Roesler	United States	1:01.1
2024	Vytautas Kirkliauskas	Neringa Kirkliauskas	Lithuania	1:03.5
2023	Taisto Miettinen	Katja Kovanen	Finland	1:06.2
2022	Taisto Miettinen	Katja Kovanen	Finland	1:04.3
2019	Vytautas Kirkliauskas	Neringa Kirkliauskienė	Lithuania	1:06.7
2018	Vytautas Kirkliauskas	Neringa Kirkliauskienė	Lithuania	1:05.1
2017	Taisto Miettinen	Kristiina Haapanen	Finland	1:08.6
2016	Dmitri Sagal	Anastasia Loginova	Russia	1:04.1
2015	Ville Parviainen	Sari Viljanen	Finland	1:02.8
2014	Ville Parviainen	Janette Oksman	Finland	1:03.7
2013	Taisto Miettinen	Kristiina Haapanen	Finland	1:05.0
2012	Taisto Miettinen	Kristiina Haapanen	Finland	1:12.2
2011	Taisto Miettinen	Kristiina Haapanen	Finland	1:00.7
2010	Taisto Miettinen	Kristiina Haapanen	Finland	1:04.9
2009	Taisto Miettinen	Kristiina Haapanen	Finland	1:02.0
2008	Alar Voogla	Kristi Viltrop	Estonia	1:01.9
2007	Madis Uusorg	Inga Klauson	Estonia	1:01.7
2006	Margo Uusorg	Sandra Kullas	Estonia	0:56.9
2005	Margo Uusorg	Egle Soll	Estonia	0:59.1
2004	Madis Uusorg	Inga Klauson	Estonia	1:05.3
2003	Margo Uusorg	Egle Soll	Estonia	1:00.7
2002	Meelis Tammre	Anne Zilberberg	Estonia	1:03.8
2001	Margo Uusorg	Birgit Ullrich	Estonia	0:55.6
2000	Margo Uusorg	Birgit Ullrich	Estonia	0:55.5
1999	Imre Ambos	Annela Ojaste	Estonia	1:04.5
1998	Imre Ambos	Annela Ojaste	Estonia	1:09.2
1997	Jouni Jussila	Tiina Jussila	Finland	1:05.0
1996	Jouni Jussila	Tiina Jussila	Finland	1:05.8

Wife Carrying Sprint World Champions (2006–2026)
Year	Carrier	Carried	Country
2026	Teemu Tuovinen	Jatta Leinonen	Finland
2025	Severi Allonen	Karla Könönen	Finland
2024	Elliott Earnshaw	Adelaide Taylor	Australia
2023	Ilpo Haalisto	Jenni Piippo	Finland
2022	Joni Juntunen	Jaana Haavikko	Finland
2019	Ilpo Haalisto	Jenni Piippo	Finland
2018	Thomas Kueng	Sandra Burch	Germany
2017	Philipp Spiess	Kim Stella Müller	Switzerland
2016	Joni Juntunen	Jaana Haavikko	Finland
2015	Joni Juntunen	Jaana Haavikko	Finland
2014	Joni Juntunen	Jaana Haavikko	Finland
2013	Alar Voogla	Kristi Viltrop	Estonia
2012	Joni Juntunen	Jaana Haavikko	Finland
2011	Alar Voogla	Kristi Viltrop	Estonia
2010	Alar Voogla	Kristi Viltrop	Estonia
2009	Renno Remmel	Merlin Linnusaar	Estonia
2008	Joni Juntunen	Jaana Haavikko	Finland
2007	Ranner Kuningas	Inga Klauson	Estonia
2006	Renno Remmel	Kati Elmi	Estonia

Wife Carrying Team Race World Champions (1996–2026)
Year	Winning Team	Members (Carriers & Carried)	Country
2026	Team Beer For My Horses	Andrew Lee, Devon Lee, Joshua Crafter, Vytautas Kirkliauskas	United States / Lithuania
2025	Team Big Beef	Joni Juntunen, Siiri Koskinen, John Lund, Elliot Storey	Finland / United States
2024	Team Australia	Elliott Earnshaw, Angus Mcdonald, Patrick Mahony, Adelaide Taylor	Australia
2023	Maailmanmestaruuden metsästäjät	Joni Juntunen, Antti Siltala, John Lund, Jaana Haavikko	Finland / United States
2022	Serti	Joni Juntunen, Toni Hynynen, Timo Pudas, Jaana Haavikko	Finland
2019	Serti	Toni Hynynen, Timo Pudas, Jaana Haavikko, Joni Juntunen	Finland
2018	Serti	Sami Tervo, Timo Pudas, Jaana Haavikko, Joni Juntunen	Finland
2017	Serti	Toni Hynynen, Timo Pudas, Jaana Haavikko, Joni Juntunen	Finland
2016	Serti	Toni Hynynen, Timo Pudas, Jaana Haavikko, Joni Juntunen	Finland
2015	Sonkarun	Toni Hynynen, Mika Suomalainen, Jaana Haavikko, Joni Juntunen	Finland
2014	Sonkarun	Toni Hynynen, Mika Suomalainen, Jaana Haavikko, Joni Juntunen	Finland
2013	Sonkarun	Toni Hynynen, Mika Suomalainen, Jaana Haavikko, Joni Juntunen	Finland
2012	Sonkarun	Toni Hynynen, Mika Suomalainen, Jaana Haavikko, Joni Juntunen	Finland
2011	Sonkarun	Toni Hynynen, Mika Suomalainen, Jaana Haavikko, Joni Juntunen	Finland
2010	Konkurendid	Kristi Viltrop, Alar Voogla, Renno Remmel, Marek Zahka	Estonia
2009	Sõbrad	Merlin Linnusaar, Mauri Zahkna, Marek Zahkna, Renno Remmel	Estonia
2008	Sõbrad	Merlin Linnusaar, Mauri Zahkna, Marek Zahkna, Renno Remmel	Estonia
2007	Sõbrad	Merlin Linnusaar, Mauri Zahkna, Marek Zahkna, Renno Remmel	Estonia
2006	Sõbrad	Kati Elmi, Mauri Zahkna, Marek Zahkna, Renno Remmel	Estonia
2005	Sõbrad	Merlin Linnusaar, Mauri Zahka, Renno Remmel, Marek Zahka	Estonia
2004	Äntu Farm	Ivi Löömets, Ants Einsalu, Margo Hussar, Janek Löömets	Estonia
2003	Äntu Farm	Ivi Löömets, Ants Einsalu, Jaanus Pajula, Janek Löömets	Estonia
2002	Iisalmen Putkiasennus Oy / Äntu Farm	Joni Juntunen, Jorma Ryhänen, Petri Vinkki, Johanna Jauhiainen / Estonia	Finland / Estonia
2001	Väike-Maarja Vald	(Individual squad members not archived)	Estonia
2000	Ylä-Savon kihlakunnan poliisit	Marko Tervo, Tuomo Eskelinen, Jari Rytkönen, Sirpa-Riitta Patronen	Finland
1999	Iisalmen Putkiasennus Oy	Joni Juntunen, Jorma Ryhänen, Arto Lappalainen, Katri Rask	Finland
1998	Ylä-Savon kihlakunnan poliisit	Jari Rytkönen, Jorma Rannio, Pekka Korhonen, Sirpa-Riitta Patronen	Finland
1997	Ylä-Savon kihlakunnan poliisit	Tuomo Eskelinen, Pekka Korhonen, Marko Tervo, Marja Pääkkö	Finland
1996	Ylä-Savon kihlakunnan poliisit	Marko Tervo, Reijo Kärkkäinen, Pekka Korhonen, Marja Pääkkö	Finland

Combined Wife Carrying World Championships by Country (Main, Sprint & Team Events)
Rank	Country	Gold (Main)	Gold (Sprint)	Gold (Team)	Total Championships
1	Finland	13	10	18*	41
2	Estonia	11	6	10*	27
3	Lithuania	3	0	1*	4
4	United States	1	0	3*	4
5	Australia	0	1	1	2
6	Russia	1	0	0	1
7	Switzerland	0	1	0	1
8	Germany	0	1	0	1
Total	All countries	29	19	31	79

*Note: Contains at least one team championship won as part of a mixed-nationality or international squad.

== Countries ==
=== Australia ===
Australian Wife Carrying Championships have been held annually since 2005.

Year	Winners	Nationality
2005	Anthony Partridge & Angela Cafe	Australia
2006	Kal Baker & Kelly Smith	Australia
2007	Anthony Partridge and Angela Moore	Australia
2008	Jason Doyle & Lyneece Garland	Australia
2009	Anthony Partridge & Kath Whalan	Australia
2010	Anthony Partridge & Kath Whalan	Australia
2011	Michael & Emma Blenman	Australia
2012	Beau Mynard & Ellie Gresham	Australia
2013	Amiee & Jamie Graham	Australia
2014	Jade Cupitt & Luke Papworth	Australia
2015	Jess McCallum & Ben Gregg	Australia
2016	Adrian and Amanda Betts	Australia
2017	Adam Cullen & Tylee Robinson	Australia
2018	Dylan Hedges & Alana Flemming	Australia
2019	Nicholas Metcalf & Jess Codrington	Australia
2022	Nick & Ashleigh Topham	Australia
2023	Elliott Earnshaw and Adelaide Taylor	Australia
2024	Oliver Klotz & Emma Bestic	Australia
2025	Ben & Jess Gregg	Australia

=== Finland ===
The Finnish Wife Carrying Championships were first held in 1992 in Sonkajärvi, Finland. Following the rapid growth and international interest in the event, the national competition expanded into the official Wife Carrying World Championships in 1996. From 1992 to 1995, the event was run as a national Finnish championship before transitioning into the World Championship era.

Year	Winners	Hometown	Nationality
1992	Jouni Jussila & Tiina Kaipainen	Raisio	Finland
1993	Jouni Jussila & Tiina Kaipiainen	Raisio	Finland
1994	Jouni Jussila & Tiina Kaipiainen	Raisio	Finland
1995	Ilpo Rönkkö & Anneli Rönkkö	Vieremä	Finland

=== United Kingdom ===
The United Kingdom Wife Carrying Race was introduced in 2008, though the "sport" is claimed to have taken place "with help from our Scandinavian cousins" for around 1200 years from 793AD when Viking raiders raided villages and abducted wives.

Year	Winners	Nationality
2008	Joel Hicks & Wendy Cook	Great Britain
2009	Matt Evans & Jatinder Gill	Great Britain
2010	John Lund & Rosa Fenwick	Great Britain
2011	Sammy Trowbridge & Nathalie	Great Britain
2012	Tom Wilmot & Kirsty Wilmot	Great Britain
2013	Mike Witko & Lindsey Finn	Great Britain
2014	Rich Blake Smith & Anna Smith	Great Britain
2015	Jonathan Schwochert & Charlotte Xiong	Great Britain
2016	Jonathan Schwochert & Charlotte Xiong	Great Britain
2017	Jack McKendrick & Kirsty Jones	Great Britain
2018	Chris Hepworth & Tanisha Prince	Great Britain
2019	Chris Hepworth & Tanisha Prince	Great Britain
2020	Mark Threlfall & Cassie Yates	Great Britain
2021	Event not held	—
2022	Alex Bone & Millie Barnham	Great Britain
2023	Vytautas Kirkliauskas & Neringa Kirkliauskiene	Lithuania
2024	Stuart Johnson & Hattie Cronin	Great Britain
2025	Stuart Johnson & Hattie Cronin	Great Britain
2026	Teemu Tuovinen & Jatta Leinonen	Finland

=== United States ===
The US final takes place on the second weekend of July in Menahga Minnesota (MN-St. Urho Wife Carry for Charity Challenge). Wife-carrying competitions are also held in Monona, Wisconsin, Minocqua, Wisconsin and Marquette, Michigan.

The North American Wife Carrying Championships takes place every year since 1999 on Indigenous People's Day Weekend in October at Sunday River Ski Resort in Newry, Maine.

== In popular culture ==
- North American champions Ehrin and April Armstrong were featured as guests on a first-season episode of GSN's revival of I've Got a Secret.
- BBC Presenters Mike Bushell and Steph McGovern reversed the roles when they took part in the UK annual wife-carrying competition in 2013, she carried him. Bushell said this was a first.

== See also ==
- Cheese rolling
- Idiotarod
- Kinetic sculpture race
- Wok racing
- Zoobomb
- Bog snorkelling
- Sepak takraw
