= Idiotarod =

Shopping cart race

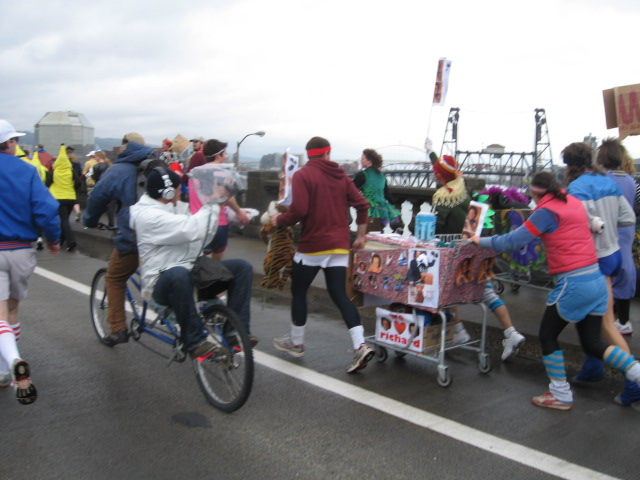
Costumed participants in the Urban Idiotarod race over the Burnside Bridge in shopping carts

The Idiotarod is a shopping cart race in which teams of five or more "idiots" with a (sometimes modified) grocery store shopping cart run through the streets of a major metropolitan area. The carts are usually themed and feature people in costumes. The races are fun competitions where sabotage, costume, and presentation, and other efforts are rewarded; some cities offer a "Best in Show" prize. Sabotage, such as tripping competitors, throwing marbles or large obstacles in their paths, and the spreading of misinformation such as false route information, were common in the early years. A push for "leave no trace" actions has been promoted recently.

The Idiotarod is named after the Iditarod, a 1,000 mile dog-sledding race in Alaska.

Idiotarods have taken place in Ann Arbor, Asheville, Austin, Boston, Chicago, Cincinnati, Dallas, Denver, Iowa City, New York City, Phoenix, Portland, Salt Lake City, Seattle, St. Louis, Toronto, Los Angeles, Vancouver and Washington, D.C., though the original race was founded in San Francisco in 1994 as the "Urban Iditarod".

== Portland, Oregon ==
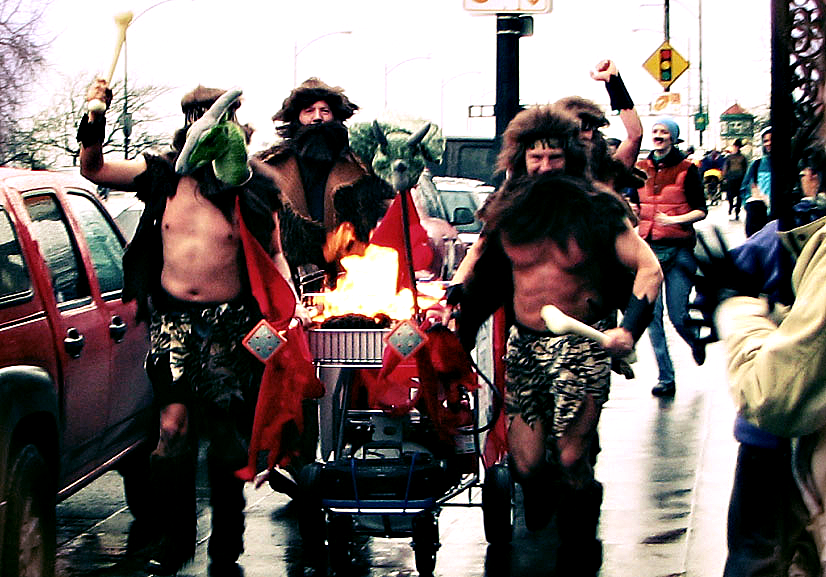
Team "Quest for Fire" runs the idiotarod in 2008 with a propane fire burning in their cart

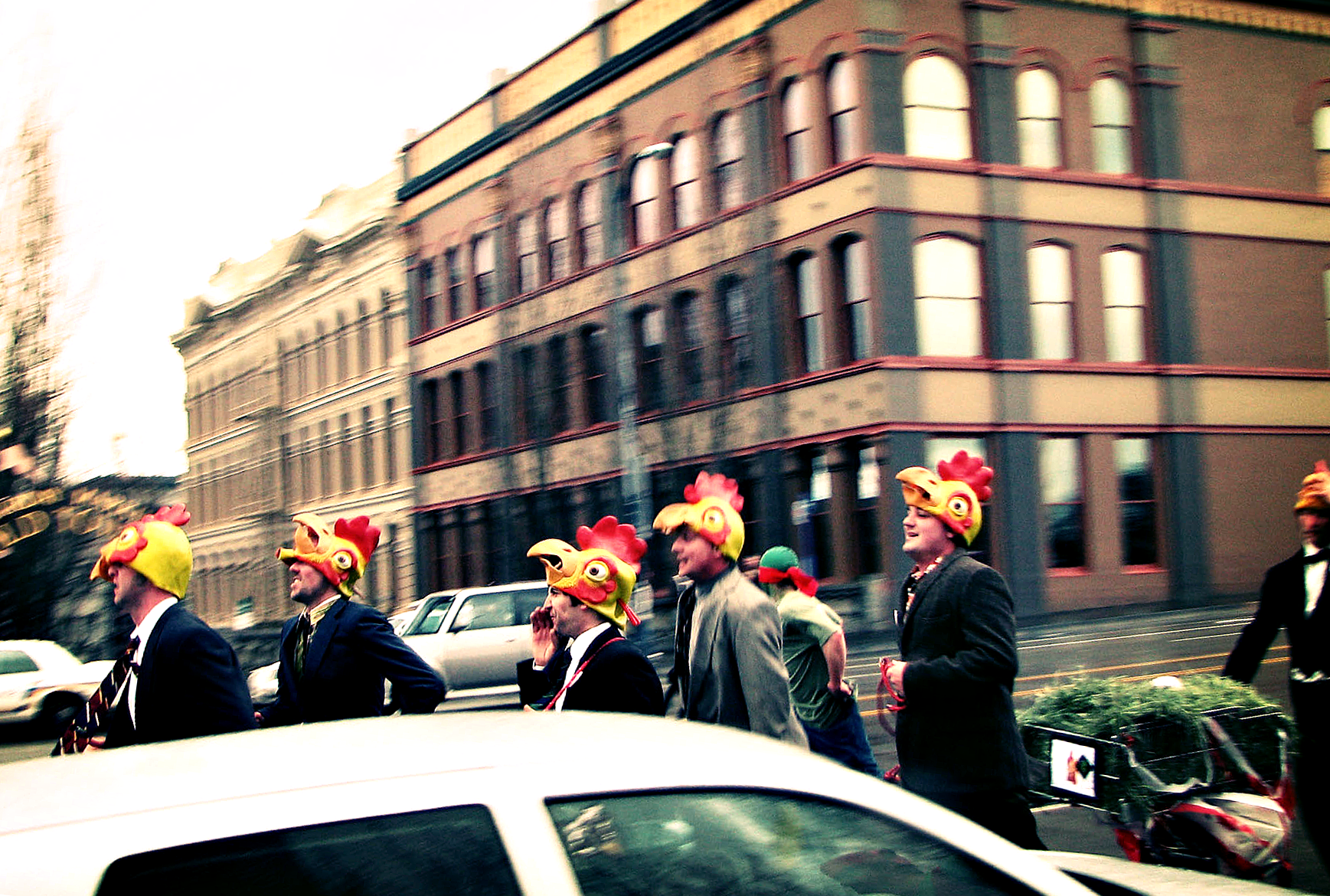
Team "Chickenhead" competes in the 2008 idiotarod

The Portland Urban Iditarod, which began in March 2001, runs through a course over four miles through downtown Portland, Oregon. This race occurs on the first Saturday of March, the same date as the actual Alaskan Iditarod. Racers wear "absurd" costumes, including Spanish bullfighters and diaper-wearing astronauts, and make stops at pubs and bars along the way. There are no winners or losers in the Portland event.

== Chicago, Illinois ==
Chicago's Urban Iditarod, called the Chiditarod, has been held annually on the first Saturday in March since 2006. Historically the race has occurred in and around the Chicago neighborhood of West Town. Much like other Urban Iditarods, a Chiditarod team includes 5 participants: 4 dawgs and a musher. Teams are required to use a regular shopping cart and are not allowed to modify the cart's original caster wheels. Beyond this limitation, teams are encouraged to take artistic liberties with their carts and participants often decorate their carts in highly creative ways and dress in costume to match their team's theme. Like a traditional race, teams compete to finish the course in as little time as possible, while making designated stops at checkpoints along the course. Participating teams are allowed and even encouraged to sabotage each other in order to gain advantage but most teams engage in sabotage merely for bragging rights. In the spirit of radical inclusion, the Chiditarod organizers hand out a number of awards in a variety of categories giving participants the freedom to compete in the fields they are best suited for.

The landmark of the Chiditarod is the event's charitable aspect. Billing itself as "Probably the world's largest mobile food drive," the Chiditarod plays an important role in helping raise foods for Chicago's food depositories, where in teams were asked to donate a minimum amount of high protein, non perishable food items. Racers also raise funds to help solve hunger issues with all funds directed to community grants programs that are finding new ways to solve food insecurities.

Another notable innovation is the organization's approach to self-policing. In an effort to keep all participants safe throughout the course, the Chiditarod deploys bike marshals who act as roaming course deputies: resolving disputes between teams, mitigating destructive sabotage, safeguarding participant conduct, and lending a helping hand when necessary.

== Trademark claim ==
In 2014, the Iditarod Trail Sled Dog Race sent a cease-and-desist order to Idiotarod NYC, asserting that the name "Idiotarod" infringed its trademark in "Iditarod." Idiotarod NYC characterized the letter as "frivolous threats of legal action", but renamed the event to "Idiotarodorama NYC (a.k.a. 'The Desistarod')".

== See also ==
- Kinetic sculpture race
- Wife carrying
- Wok racing
- Zoobomb
- Carts of Darkness, a documentary about shopping cart racing
- Chair Race (sit or stand)
