= Wok racing =

Racing using woks as sleds

Wok Racing
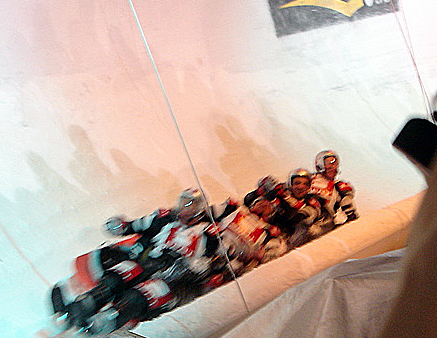
- Georg Hackl's four-person woksled during the Wok World Championship 2006 in Innsbruck
- Highest governing body: International Bobsleigh and Skeleton Federation
- First played: 2003

Characteristics
- Team members: Teams of 1 or 4
- Type: Winter sport, Time trial
- Equipment: Wok
- Venue: Bobsleigh tracks

Presence
- Olympic: No

Wok racing is a sport developed by the German TV host and entertainer Stefan Raab in which modified woks are used to make timed runs down an Olympic bobsleigh track. There are competitions for one-person woksleds and four-person woksleds, the latter using four woks per sled.

== History ==
Wok racing was inspired by a bet in the German TV show Wetten, dass..?. In November 2003, the First official Wok World Championship was broadcast from Winterberg. The immediate success led to the second world championship in Innsbruck on March 4, 2004. Participants are mostly b-list celebrities like musical artists, actors, and TV hosts, but there are also known athletes that have ongoing professional careers in winter sports, like three-time Olympic luge champion Georg Hackl and the Jamaican Bobsled Team.

The third championship took place again in Winterberg on March 5, 2005. In contrast to the previous championships, there were two runs in which all contesters participated. The times of both runs were added. As a further innovation a qualifying round was created in which the participants had to jump from a trickski-jump with woks to determine the starting order. Further the sport event was professionalized.

== Equipment ==
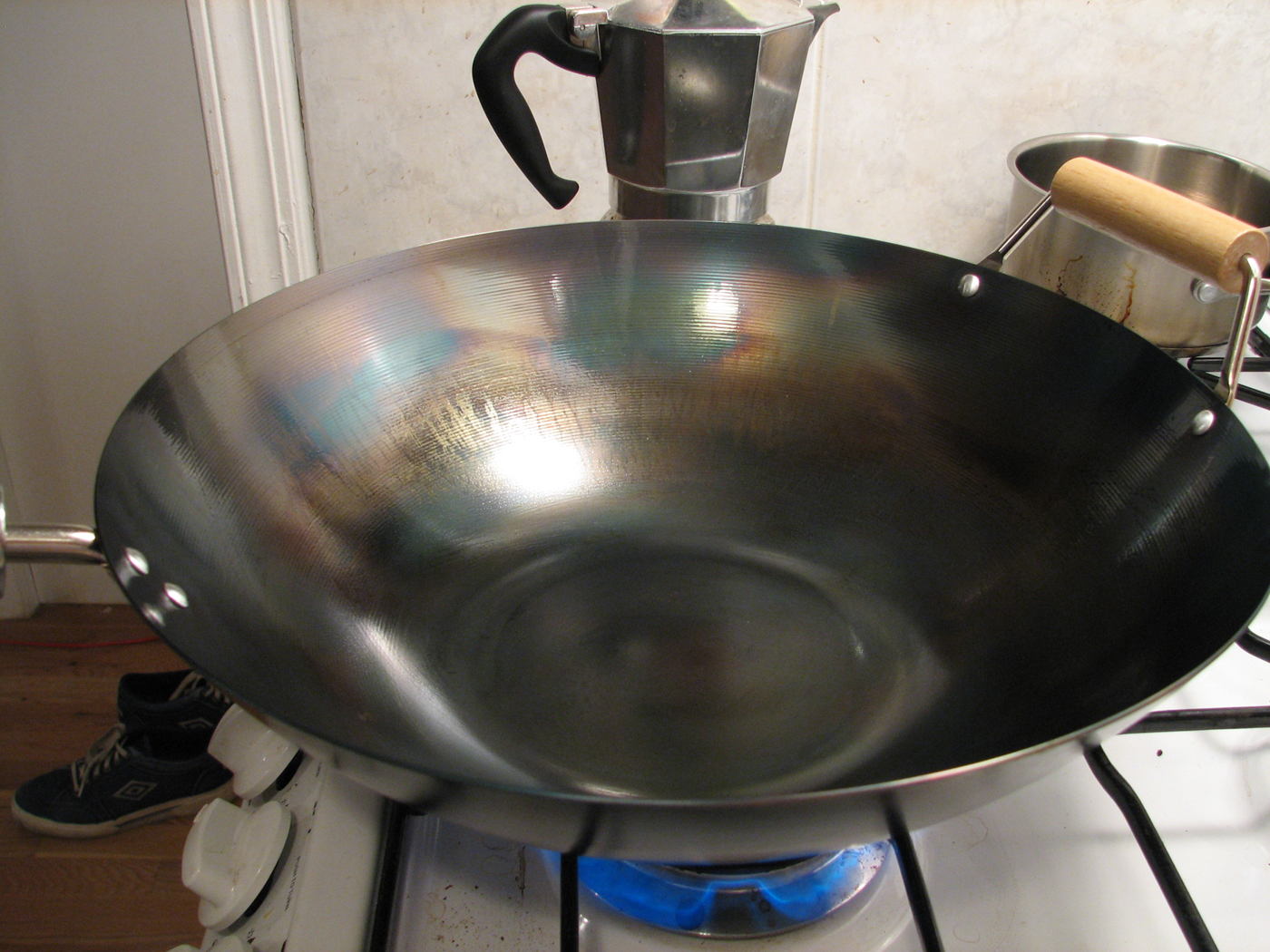
An ordinary wok

Typical racing woks are usually directly imported from China. The only modifications are that the bottom is reinforced with an epoxy filling and heated with a blowlamp. Four-person woksleds consist of two pairs of woks, each of them is held together by a rounded frame. The two pairs are connected by a coupling. Due to the rather risky nature of the sport the participants wear heavy protective gear, usually similar to ice hockey equipment. To further reduce friction and the risk of injuries, the athletes wear ladles under their feet.

== Advertising controversy ==
Public wok racing is only practiced once a year at The "World Wok Racing Championships" (German: Wok-WM, German pronunciation: [ˈvɔk.veːˌɛm], lit. Wok Worldcup) which is aired as special edition of Raab's show TV total on the German television channel ProSieben. The network used to declare these broadcasts as sporting events. Under German law that allowed the network to treat the massive corporate sponsorship of the event as incidental advertising which didn't count against Germany's strict rules regarding time limits for TV commercials. After a Berlin court ruling in 2009, however, the shows have to be labeled as an infomercial, since – unlike a regular sporting event – the races are explicitly staged for the TV broadcast, and there is strong evidence that the profits of the event sponsorship directly benefit the network.

== World Wok Racing Championships ==
=== Venues ===
- (Germany) November 6, 2003: Winterberg
- (Austria) March 4, 2004: Innsbruck
- (Germany) March 5, 2005: Winterberg
- (Austria) March 11, 2006: Innsbruck
- (Austria) March 9, 2007: Innsbruck
- (Germany) March 8, 2008: Altenberg
- (Germany) March 7, 2009: Winterberg
- (Germany) March 19, 2010: Oberhof
- (Austria) March 12, 2011: Innsbruck
- (Germany) March 10, 2012: Königssee
- (Germany) March 2, 2013: Oberhof
- (Germany) March 8, 2014: Königssee
- (Austria) March 14, 2015: Innsbruck
- (Germany) November 12, 2022: Winterberg
- (Germany) November 11, 2023: Winterberg

=== Ranking ===
==== One-person Wok ====
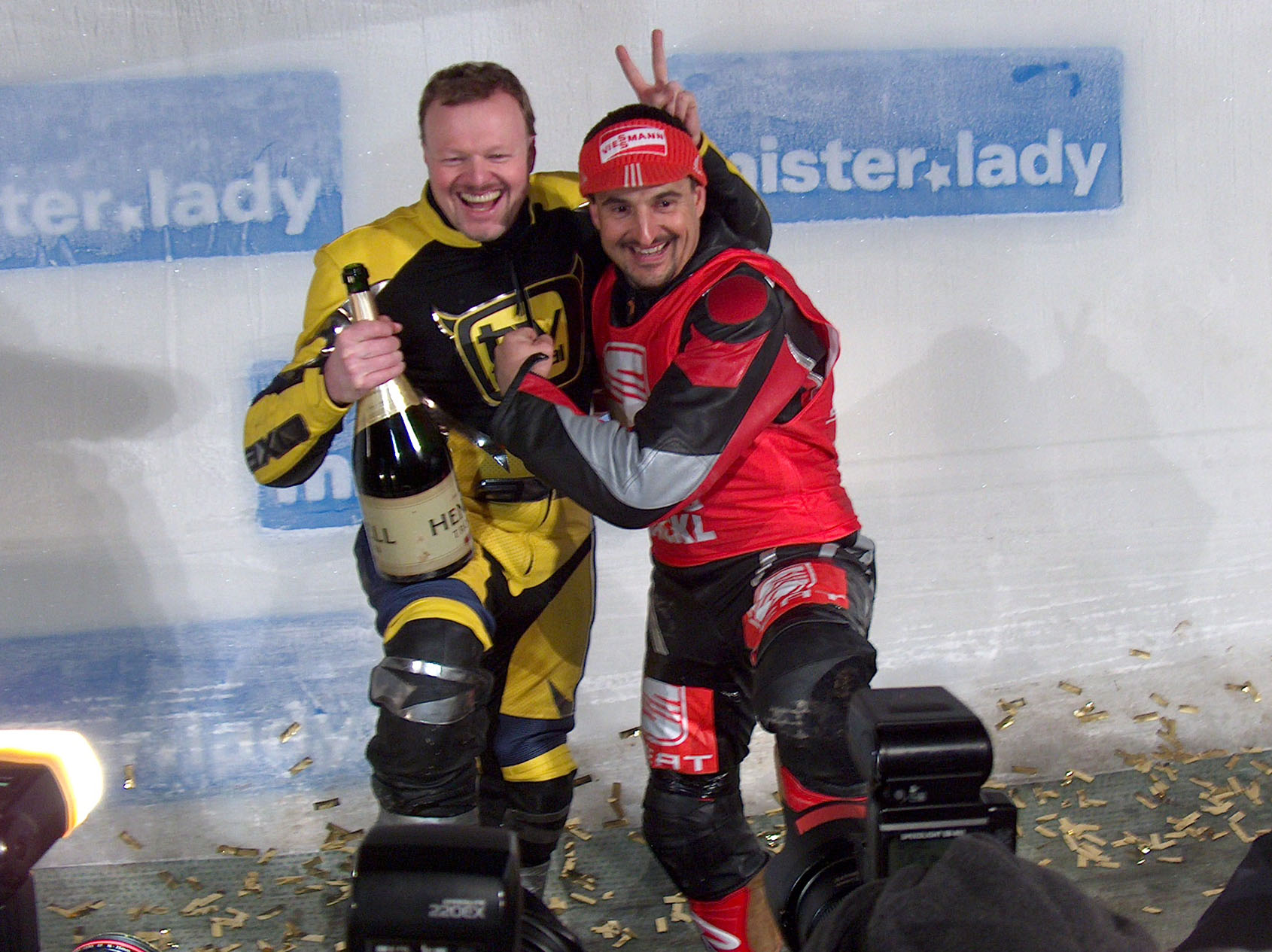
Stefan Raab and Georg Hackl at the Wok-WM 2008

Year	Gold	Silver	Bronze
2003	(Germany) Stefan Raab	(Republic of Ireland) Joey Kelly	(Germany) Detlef Soost
2004	(Germany) Georg Hackl	(Republic of Ireland) Joey Kelly	(Germany) Stefan Raab
2005	(Germany) Georg Hackl	(Germany) Stefan Raab	(Republic of Ireland) Joey Kelly
2006	(Republic of Ireland) Joey Kelly	(Germany) Georg Hackl	(Germany) Stefan Raab
2007	(Germany) Georg Hackl	(Republic of Ireland) Joey Kelly	(Germany) Stefan Raab
2008	(Germany) Georg Hackl	(Austria) Christian Clerici	(Republic of Ireland) Joey Kelly
2009	(Germany) Georg Hackl	(Germany) Felix Loch	(Republic of Ireland) Joey Kelly
2010	(Germany) Georg Hackl	(Republic of Ireland) Joey Kelly	(Austria) Christian Clerici
2011	(Germany) Georg Hackl	(Germany) Felix Loch	(Bulgaria) Lucy Diakovska
2012	(Germany) Georg Hackl	(Bulgaria) Lucy Diakovska	(Republic of Ireland) Joey Kelly
2013	(Germany) Georg Hackl	(Bulgaria) Lucy Diakovska	(Italy) Armin Zöggeler
2014	(Republic of Ireland) Joey Kelly	(Germany) Georg Hackl	(Italy) Armin Zöggeler
2015	(Italy) Armin Zöggeler	(Germany) Georg Hackl	(Republic of Ireland) Joey Kelly
2022	(Republic of Ireland) Joey Kelly	(Greece) Lucas Cordalis	(Turkey) Jolina Mennen
2023	(Republic of Ireland) Joey Kelly	(Italy) Armin Zöggeler	(Germany) Sophia Thiel

==== Four-person Wok ====
Year	Team	Drivers
2003	Dick Brave and the Backbeats	Sascha Schmitz, Andre Tolba, Felix Wiegand, Martell Beigang
2004	ProSieben team	Ralf Zacherl, Stefan Gödde, Dominik Bachmair, Simon Gosejohann
2005	ProSieben team	Joey Kelly, Stefan Gödde, Charlotte Engelhardt, Lukas Hilbert
2006	Fisherman's Friend team	Sandra Kiriasis, Christoph Langen, Silke Kraushaar, Susi Erdmann
2007	SEAT team	Sven Hannawald, Susi Kentikian, Christina Surer, Markus Beyer
2008	Frosta-team	Christoph Langen, Susi Erdmann, Silke Kraushaar, Felix Loch
2009	TV total team	Stefan Raab, André Lange, Axel Stein, Björn Dunkerbeck
2010	TV total team	Stefan Raab, André Lange, Axel Stein, Björn Dunkerbeck
2011	Babybel team	Sandra Kiriasis, Tatjana Hüfner, Manuel Machata, Christoph Langen
2012	TV total team	Stefan Raab, Felix Loch, Manuel Machata, Tim Lobinger
2013	TV total team	Stefan Raab, Felix Loch, Manuel Machata, Steffen Henssler
2014	Otelo team	Seldwyn Morgan, Hanukkah Wallace, Marvin Dixon, Wayne Blackwood
2015	Europa Versicherungen/Austria team	Markus Prock, Ulrike Kriegler, Marc Pircher, Janine Flock
2022	Chocomel/Germany team 3	Johannes Ludwig, Felix von Jascheroff, Francesco Friedrich, Evi Sachenbacher-Stehle
2023	Zoll-Karriere/Germany team 2	Sven Hannawald, Thore Schölermann, Pascal Hens, Thorsten Legat

=== Records ===
==== Speed records ====
One-Person-Wok
Place	Speed in km/h	Holder	Year
Innsbruck	91.70	Georg Hackl	2007
Altenberg	81.80	Georg Hackl	2008
Winterberg	105.40	Georg Hackl	2009
Oberhof	69.40	Georg Hackl	2010
Königsee	88.20	Georg Hackl	2012

Four-Person-Wok
Place	Speed in km/h	Holder	Year
Winterberg	114.3	Elton & Friends	2009
Innsbruck	97.00	FROSTA	2006

==== Course Records ====
One-Person-Wok
Place	Time in seconds	Holder	Year
Winterberg	47.621	Georg Hackl	2005
Innsbruck	54.840	Georg Hackl	2007

Four-Person-Wok
Place	Time in seconds	Holder	Year
Winterberg	57.117	TV total	2005
Innsbruck	52.527	Fisherman's Friend	2006

== See also ==
- Idiotarod
- Kinetic sculpture race
- Portland Urban Iditarod
- Shopping cart race
- Wife carrying
- Zoobomb
