= China's Unnatural Disaster: The Tears of Sichuan Province =

- Directed by: Jon Alpert; Matthew O'Neill
- Countries of origin: United States; China
- Original language: Chinese (English subtitles)

Production
- Producers: Jon Alpert; Matthew O'Neill
- Running time: 39 minutes
- Production companies: Downtown Community Television Center; MZ Pictures; HBO Films

Original release
- Network: HBO
- Release: May 7, 2009

China's Unnatural Disaster: The Tears of Sichuan Province is a 2009 documentary film co-directed by Jon Alpert and Matthew O'Neill of the Downtown Community Television Center, and produced by MZ Pictures for HBO Films.

The documentary covers the aftermath of the 2008 Sichuan earthquake on May 12, which killed around 70,000 people—of which 10,000 were children, many of whom were killed when their schools collapsed. The film focuses on the grieving families and communities of the children as they mourn their loss and question the government over the construction standard of the schools.

Alpert and O'Neill sent the raw footage of the film by courier to the United States, before they were detained and questioned by local police for eight hours as they tried to leave the country themselves. In September 2009, the filmmakers were scheduled to present the film at the Shanghai International Film Festival, but were denied visas by the Chinese government.

China's Unnatural Disaster was nominated for the Academy Award for Best Documentary (Short Subject) in 2009.
