= MZ Pictures =

Media company in Shanghai, China

MZ Pictures is a specialized film and TV production company based incorporated in 2009 in Shanghai, China, whose precursor is the MZ Film Workshop founded by Mi Zi, who has been involved in the production of numerous award-winning documentaries, feature films, commercials, TV series and stage plays.

They also released the digital 3D animation feature, Ping Pong Rabbit (2017).

A co-production project, Sweetheart Chocolate, took off at the end of 2009 and is in preproduction now. It will be filmed in both Hokkaido, Japan, and Shanghai, China. The core production team is from both Japan and China, and the lead roles will be playing by the stars from Japan, China, and Korea.

== Awards ==
- 2007 79th Academy Awards Best Documentary, Short Subjects The Blood of Yingzhou District
- 2008 Asia Pacific Screen Awards Best Performance by an Actress: Miao Pu Cherries (Nomination)
- 2009 82nd Academy Awards Best Documentary, Short Subjects China's Unnatural Disaster: The Tears of Sichuan Province

== Filmography ==
=== Narrative Feature ===
- 2012 Sweetheart Chocolate
- 2008 Letters From Death Row
- 2008 Forever Singing
- 2008 Dowry
- 2007 Cherries
- 2005 China Flower
- 2004 Cannot Cry

=== Documentary ===
- 2008 China's Unnatural Disaster: The Tears of Sichuan Province
- 2007 The Blood of Yingzhou District

=== Animation ===
- 2017 Ping Pong Rabbit (Digital 3D Animation)
