= Life of Crime (documentary trilogy) =

American documentary series

One Year in a Life of Crime Life of Crime 2 Life of Crime, 1984-2020
- Directed by: Jon Alpert
- Produced by: Jon Alpert; Maryann De Leo (L of C 1); Janet Storti (L of C 1); Sheila Nevins (L of C 2); Nancy Abraham (L of C 3); Lisa Heller (L of C 3)
- Starring: Rob Steffey; Mike McGrath; Freddie Rodriguez; Deliris Vasquez
- Edited by: Dani Froelich (L of C 1); John Custodio (L of C 2); Patrick McMahon ACE (L of C 3)
- Music by: W. Craig Crawford (L of C 1); Residente (L of C 3)
- Production company: Downtown Community Television Center
- Distributed by: HBO
- Release dates: November 30, 1989 (One Year in a Life of Crime); December 15, 1998 (Life of Crime 2); November 30, 2021 (Life of Crime, 1984-2020)
- Running time: 55 minutes 119 minutes 121 minutes
- Country: United States
- Language: English

The Life of Crime trilogy is a series of three American documentaries from director Jon Alpert titled One Year in a Life of Crime (1989), Life of Crime 2 (1998), and Life of Crime, 1984-2020 (2021). The documentaries appeared on HBO and follow the lives of four criminals in Newark, New Jersey, as they shoplift, use drugs, and navigate work, family, and the penal system over thirty-six years.

The films were praised for their cinéma vérité style and intimate exploration of criminal life but were criticized for their decisions to film crimes, often with hidden cameras and without interfering, and to show graphic footage of drug use and death.

== Synopsis ==
=== One Year in a Life of Crime ===
The film opens in March 1984 with Rob Steffey, 26, and Mike McGrath, 22, two criminals from Newark, New Jersey, who are meeting up to shoplift a local store. A hidden camera follows them as they steal some bedsheets. A month later, Freddie Rodriguez, 29, is getting out of jail after serving two months for possession of cocaine. Freddie goes shoplifting with Rob and steals $170 worth of silverware.

By the end of May, Rob and Mike are shoplifting more than $400 worth of merchandise per day, and in July, Fred is arrested for grand larceny and vehicular homicide. Fred uses an alias and gets off without serving time. A local mechanic, Sid, appears twice as a voice of reason, urging Rob and Freddie to get back on track.

The film also shows the domestic issues of the three men. Rob's daughter is almost taken away by the Department of Welfare. Freddie's wife and child leave him as his drug habit gets worse. And Mike is seen being physically abusive to his pregnant girlfriend, smacking her while she cries, cowering in the bed.

In October, Mike and Freddie are caught stealing silverware, and Freddie goes to jail for six months while Mike jumps bail, leaving his mother and bail bondsmen to foot the bill. After three months of hiding at Rob's house, Mike is arrested, and in March, is sentenced to jail time. Meanwhile, Freddie is arrested several more times but finishes the film back on the streets. The film finishes by showing Rob's growing drug addiction.

=== Life of Crime 2 ===
The second installment of the trilogy picks up ten years after the end of the prior film. Rob and Freddie are in jail, and we meet Deliris, Rob's old girlfriend. She has three kids, is addicted to drugs, and is currently earning money as a prostitute, seeing three to four clients per night.

After getting released from jail and put on parole, Rob gets a job as a car salesman for a car lot. He later gets back together with Deliris, moves in with her, loses his job, and starts using drugs again. They eventually break up again after claims of infidelity and lying about drug use. Freddie gets out of jail, and we see him hook up with a woman at a motel before going to meet up with Deliris. He admits to using heroin to his parole officer. Freddie later gets an HIV test which comes back positive.

Deliris is shown leaving her kids on the street, so she can get high with Freddie in an alley. She eventually loses custody of her kids and starts using drugs with Rob. She gets a blood infection from using that almost kills her. Freddie continues to shoplift and get high and ends up back in jail for first-degree armed robbery and impersonating an officer. Deliris tries and fails to get clean. She is last seen still using, depressed, and on the streets. We hear her say, “My life is falling away, just like the rain.” The film closes with Rob, nodding out from drugs, alone, in an empty lot surrounded by rundown buildings.

=== Life of Crime, 1984-2020 ===
The first hour of the third installment of the trilogy recaps the previous films with footage featured in those films. Then it jumps to the year 2000. Freddie is in Riverfront State Prison where he's been for seven years, and Rob is in the South Woods State Prison where he's been for 28 months. Deliris is in Essex county jail. The film jumps forward in time, and they all get out of jail. Rob gets a job at Eckerds Pharmacy, and Deliris, who has been clean for three months, tries to help her friends get into a detox program. Freddie's parole officer visits Freddie at his family home and decides to mandate that Freddie cannot live there because everyone in the house also suffers from addiction. The officer shows him an apartment to rent $460 per month and gives him an ultimatum to either stay there or at a hotel. Freddie chooses the hotel.

Freddie gets to see his two kids who are excited to spend the day with him. Later, Freddie goes to his son's school, where his son has gotten in trouble, to plead on his behalf. However, Freddie eventually starts skipping parole meetings, and a warrant is issued for his arrest. He goes to New York City and gets high. Freddie turns himself in. Three years later, we are at his funeral.

Rob's girlfriend leaves him, and he loses his job because they found out he's a felon. He gets a roommate who has relapsed on drugs. In 2002, 41-year-old Rob's bloated corpse is found days after he dies from a fatal dose of highly pure heroin.

After achieving sobriety in 2007, Deliris became a motivational speaker by 2010, with audiences adopting the phrase, “If Deliris can do it, I can do it!” Her children were adults and in good health. In 2019, she was named Newark Citizen of the Year.

In July 2020, after 13 years of sobriety, Deliris died from a drug overdose. Her death followed a period of limited access to her support network during the COVID-19 pandemic in New Jersey.

== Production ==
=== Development ===
The idea for this documentary first came to director Jon Alpert when he was a victim of crime himself: His motorcycle was stolen. Additionally, a couple of people that he worked with had their apartments broken into. This inspired him to get into the mind of a criminal. He said, “Most filmmakers, when they're dealing with crime, they're hanging with the cops. It's a lot safer. If I could choose, I would probably hang with the criminals. I wanted to know who they were, why they did what they did, why their path and the path that my parents taught me to follow diverged so significantly.”

In order to find the subjects of the documentary, Alpert contacted a colleague, Janet Storti, who had worked at an alternative high school in Newark called Independence. She called the school and asked for names of students who had dropped out, which led to the introduction to Rob and Mike. The very first scene Alpert shot with them was the first scene that appeared in One Year in a Life Of Crime, where they shoplift sheets.

The reason Alpert decided to undertake a sequel was because he thought Rob had a chance of rehabilitation. Alpert said, "I wouldn't have undertaken Life of Crime 2 if I didn't think Rob had had a chance. He kept calling me from jail and imploring me to do part two and I kept on refusing....But you see, everybody in the neighborhood where he lives has HBO, and in jail at the time of the first documentary the prisoners had HBO. And there Rob was at the end of the first doc—toothless, haggard, addicted to drugs, having thrown his life away. He was embarrassed.... And something was different in his eye not completely, but I thought he had a 50-50 chance. Now Freddie I never thought could do it. I just sensed he was a little too hungry." Alpert originally thought the second film could be a reality series with weekly episodes, "like a criminal version of MTV's Real World." But HBO didn't like the idea.

After the release of the second film, Alpert intended to be finished with the series. He didn't want to continue filming a bleak situation. However, he received a call from Deliris, stating that she was clean and doing well, and he felt inspired to continue the story. He then planned a different ending for the film. Alpert said, "I talked to Mayor Baraka of Newark, and we agreed that Deliris was a war hero, and we honor our war heroes. ‘Let's declare Deliris day in Newark and let's have a parade for her and march her with all her friends down Broad Street and give her the keys to the city in a proclamation.’ And that was going to be the end of the film.” Unfortunately, Deliris relapsed and died before they could make that happen.

=== Filming ===
In a radio interview, director Jon Alpert said he started shooting the footage for this film with the intention of it appearing on the Today show. After he decided to pivot and make a documentary, HBO came on board. Alpert said, "They were interested in telling the story and allowed us to work on it for almost 40 years, so HBO was onboard from the beginning." The first film aired as part of HBO's America Undercover series.

The camera equipment evolved over the years and included hidden cameras to shoot the shoplifting scenes. The first hidden camera was created with the help of one of Panasonic's engineers. “We stayed up all night long blowtorching this big camera into something that could fit into a briefcase with a hole drilled on the side,” Alpert said. The other cameras included a large Betacam when he started and a “little Sony Handycam that cost $800” at the end of shooting, which later became his camera of choice.

Since this was before cell phones, Alpert said the best way to find his subjects was just to show up in Newark daily. He estimates he shot 500 to 600 hours of footage. Over this time, Alpert developed a relationship with the subjects and behind the scenes was trying to help them by driving them to rehab facilities, often waiting for hours while they tried to get accepted. Additionally, Alpert says he would pay for the stolen merchandise: "If Rob or Freddie stole something we circled back to the store and admitted we'd witnessed a crime and we repaid them. You see one store where Freddie was stealing tchotchkes that cost about $3,000. It got expensive."

== Reception ==
Critical reception for the films was mixed, with many journalists questioning the ethics of filming this type of criminal behavior, especially after the release of the first film. The Chicago Tribune called One Year in a Life of Crime "a grim hour that not only is disturbing for its theme of apparently hopeless, self-generating recidivism but for its questionable journalistic ethics." The Los Angeles Times said of the same film that "Alpert and De Leo tread on the ethically gray area that others in the cinema verite tradition have tripped upon before."

The New York Times also questioned the film's ethics, but noted that "the hour, co-produced and reported by Maryann De Leo, holds you. In Mr. Alpert's hands, the lightweight camera packs a heavyweight punch." And the Boston Globe said, "For all the claims against Alpert's morality, this is a supremely significant moralistic film, intentionally or not. It will never happen, but if educators wanted to deter kids from drugs and crime, One Year in a Life of Crime would be mandatory viewing."

After the release of the second film, reviews seem more positive with the Washington Post saying, "Alpert is a one-of-a-kind filmmaker (tapemaker really, since he works in video) who unites art and journalism without ever seeming to try. Whatever category Life of Crime 2 fits into, whatever it's trying to be, it does a brilliant job of it. So brilliant it hurts."

Film Critic Brian Tallerico reviewed Life of Crime, 1984-2020 for RogerEbert.com, giving it three stars out of four, noting, "It's not an easy watch, but it's a moving one."

Life of Crime, 1984-2020 was nominated for a 2021 Peabody Award, won a National News & Documentary Emmy in the category of Outstanding Crime and Justice Documentary and won the Venice Film Festival "Ambassador of Hope" award.

== In popular culture ==
One Year in a Life of Crime served as inspiration for the filmmakers Josh and Benny Safdie for their film Good Time.
