= Firehouse, Engine Company 31 =

Fire station in Manhattan, New York

- U.S. National Register of Historic Places
- New York State Register of Historic Places
- New York City Landmark
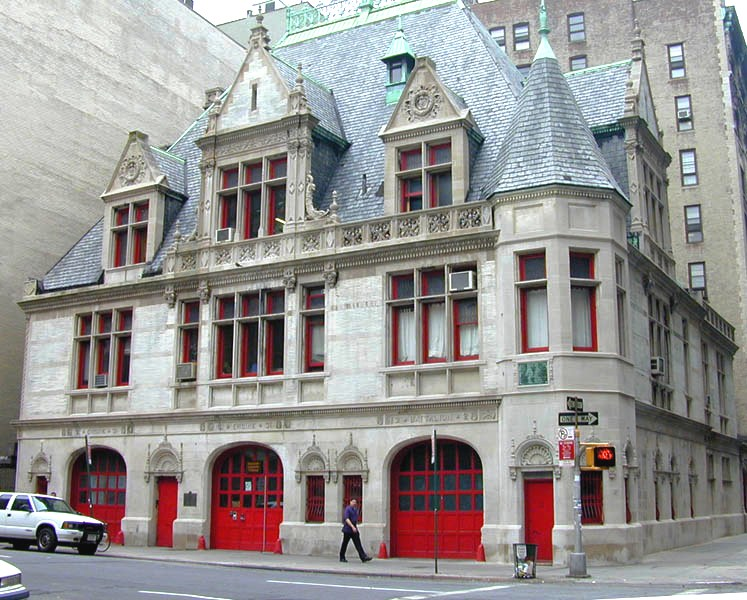
- (2006)
- Location: 87 Lafayette Street; Manhattan, New York City
- Coordinates: 40°43′02″N 74°00′5″W
- Built: 1895
- Architect: Napoleon Le Brun & Sons
- NRHP reference No.: 72000870
- NYSRHP No.: 06101.000030
- NYCL No.: 0087

Significant dates
- Added to NRHP: January 20, 1972
- Designated NYSRHP: June 23, 1980
- Designated NYCL: January 18, 1966

Firehouse, Engine Company 31 is a historic fire station located at 87 Lafayette Street between Walker and White Streets in the Tribeca and Civic Center neighborhoods of Manhattan in New York City. It was built in 1895 and designed by architects Napoleon LeBrun & Sons, who styled it after early-16th-century chateaux in the Loire Valley of France.

The building was designated a New York City Landmark in 1966 and added to the National Register of Historic Places in 1972. The New York City Fire Department vacated the building in November 1972, and it is currently occupied by the Downtown Community Television Center (DCTV).

== See also ==
- National Register of Historic Places listings in Manhattan below 14th Street
- List of New York City Designated Landmarks in Manhattan below 14th Street
