= Da Vinci Days =

Annual festival in Corvallis, Oregon, United States

- Genre: Science, art
- Date: July
- Frequency: annual
- Location: Corvallis, Oregon
- Inaugurated: 1988
- Most recent: 2024
- Website: davincidays.org

Da Vinci Days is an annual festival held in Corvallis in the U.S. state of Oregon. The science, technology, and art based festival includes live music, a kinetic sculpture race during the summer event, and lecture series in the spring. The festival is named after Italian inventor, artist, and writer, Leonardo da Vinci.

Started in 1988, the last event was held in 2018. In 2019, STEAM Series lectures will take place every Tuesday in April. The summer festival will take place, as always, during the third weekend in July.

== History ==
Da Vinci Days began in 1988 as a joint project of Oregon State University, the city, and Hewlett-Packard. The festival was not held in 2014 and 2015. The festival restructured and returned in 2016 and continues annually.

Da Vinci Days was cancelled in favor of virtual conference in 2020 due to Covid-19 pandemic.

== See also ==
- List of things named after Leonardo da Vinci
