= Redemption (2012 film) =

- Directed by: Jon Alpert; Matthew O'Neill
- Distributed by: ShortsHD; HBO
- Release date: 2012
- Country: United States

Redemption is a 2012 short documentary film directed by Jon Alpert and Matthew O'Neill. The film, which details the lives of New York City's "canners", people who survive by redeeming bottles and cans for money, was nominated for the 2013 Academy Award for Best Documentary (Short Subject).

After being nominated for an Academy Award, the film was released along with all the other 15 Oscar-nominated short films in theaters by ShortsHD.

== See also ==
- Carts of Darkness, a documentary film about "binners" in North Vancouver
