= Matthew O'Neill (filmmaker) =

American filmmaker

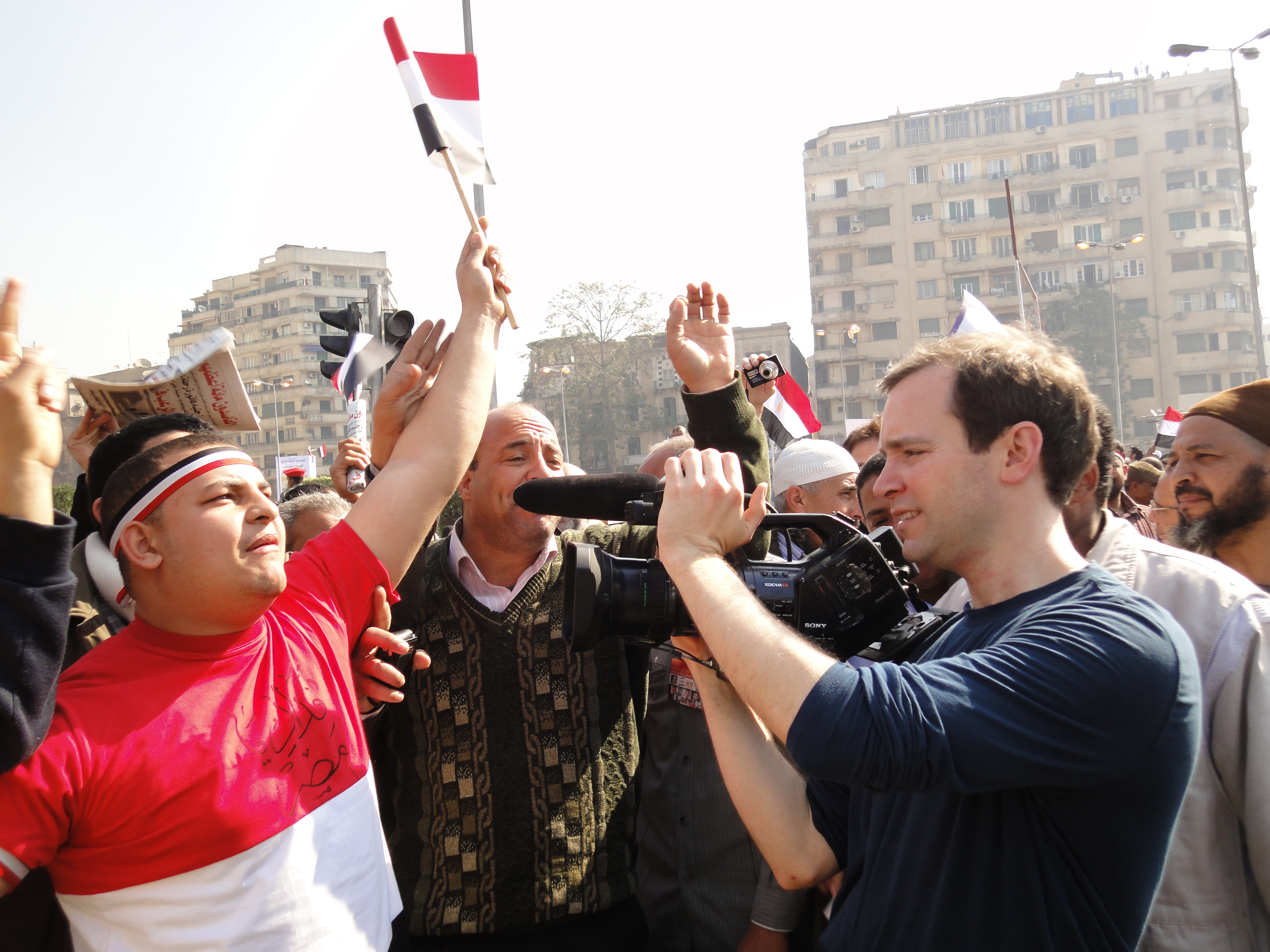
- O'Neill filming in Tahrir Square in 2011
- Born: United States
- Education: Yale University
- Occupation: Filmmaker

Matthew O'Neill is a documentary filmmaker best known for his work on the HBO film Baghdad ER, for which he and co-creator Jon Alpert won three Emmy Awards.

He and Alpert were nominated for a 2010 Academy Award for their film China's Unnatural Disaster: The Tears of Sichuan Province about the 2008 Sichuan earthquake. They were nominated again for a 2013 Academy Award for their film Redemption about individuals in New York City, known as canners, who survive by collecting cans and bottles from trash and recycling bins and redeeming them for money. Also co-producer of the Life of Crime: 1984-2020 which was nominated for a 2021 Peabody Award.

He has been involved with Downtown Community Television Center since 1997. He primarily produces films about subjects outside the United States including In Tahrir Square: 18 Days of Egypt's Unfinished Revolution (2011) about the Egyptian Revolution for HBO, Turkey's Tigers (2006) about the rise of religious Islamic businessmen in Turkey for PBS' Wide Angle and Venezuela: Revolution in Progress (2005) which aired on Discovery Times.

O'Neill is a graduate of Yale University.
