= Downtown Community Television Center =

Community media center in Manhattan, New York

Coordinates: 40°43′2.36″N 74°0′4.58″W

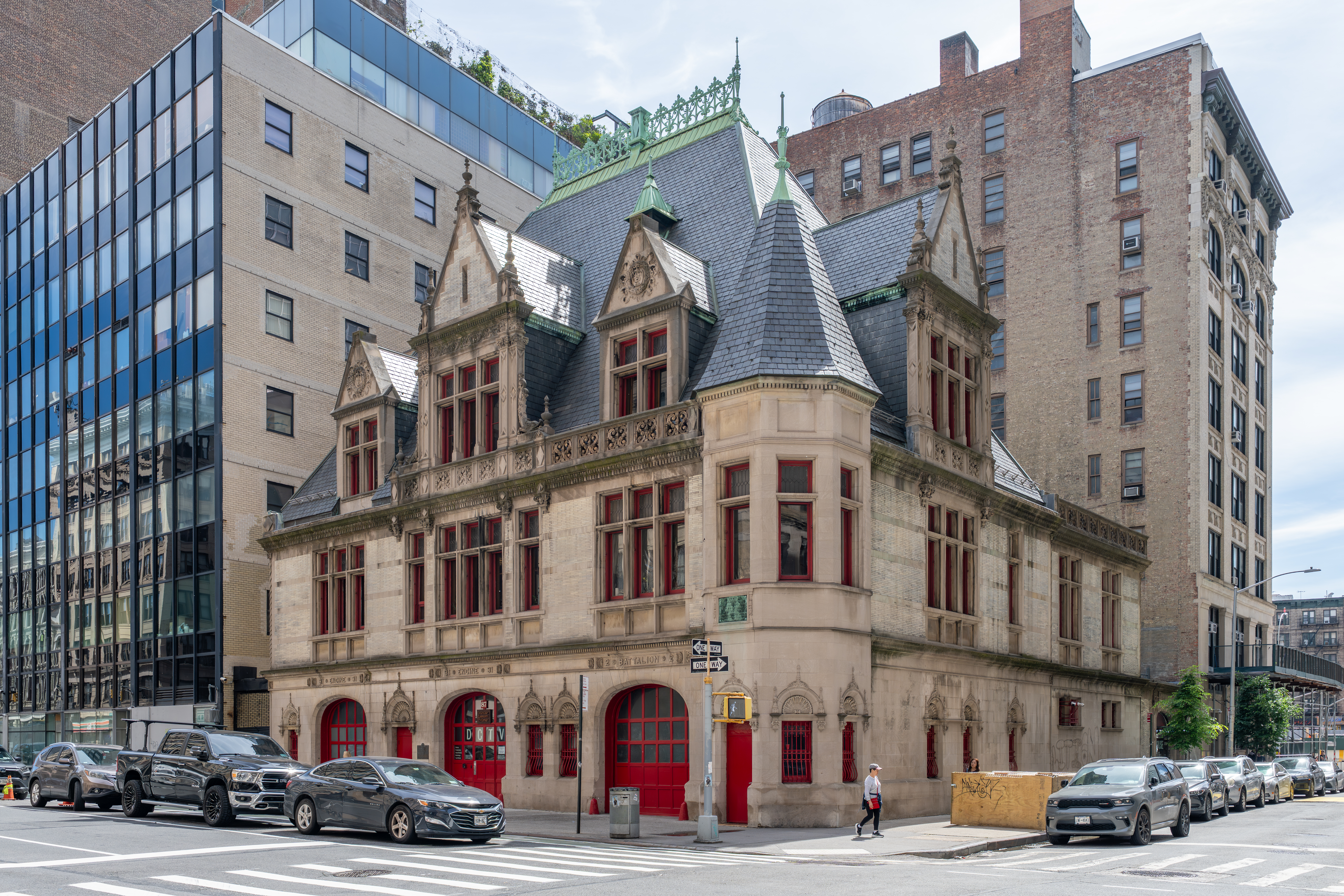
Firehouse, Engine Company 31, where DCTV is headquartered

The Downtown Community Television Center or DCTV is a community media center located in the former Engine Company 31 firehouse on Lafayette Street in the Civic Center of Manhattan, New York City. It was founded in 1972 by spouses documentary film director Jon Alpert and Keiko Tsuno.

== Mission ==
According to their website, DCTV "introduc[es] members of the community to the basics of electronic media through hundreds of free or low-cost production courses and access to broadcast-quality production equipment." DCTV conducts classes enabling people from less privileged backgrounds to learn to create video productions and operates studios available to them for low cost. These programs are funded in part by earnings from DCTV's own documentary films which have won 16 national Emmy awards and many other honors.

== Facilities ==
DCTV is based in Firehouse, Engine Company 31, a landmarked firehouse at 87 Lafayette Street in Manhattan, constructed in 1895 and purchased by DCTV in the 1980s. It offers unique and versatile multi-use venue rentals.

== Firehouse Cinema ==
In 2022, DCTV opened Firehouse Cinema as a documentary-only, art house movie theater. The cinema screens first-run films as well as specialty programming throughout the year. Dara Messinger serves as the director of programming.

== Programs ==
By providing professional training and tools, access to critical equipment and public exhibition space in Manhattan, DCTV gives youth, aspiring and emerging filmmakers and communities of all backgrounds greater voice and platforms through documentary film.

PRO-TV (Professional Youth Media Training) is a program designed to train students from New York City's underprivileged communities in media arts, using state-of-the-art equipment.

== Films ==
DCTV's productions include:

- 1980 – Third Avenue: Only the Strong Survive
- 1983 – Invisible Citizens: Japanese Americans
- 1986 – Junkie Junior
- 1986 – The Philippines: Life, Death & Revolution
- 1987 – Hard Metals Disease
- 1987 – Hunger in the Suburbs
- 1989 – One Year in a Life of Crime: Part I
- 1991 – Rape: Cries from the Heartland
- 1991 – The Story of Vinh
- 1994 – Chiapas: The Fight for Land and Liberty
- 1994 – Snakeheads: The Chinese Mafia & The New Slave Trade
- 1995 – High on Crack Street: Lost Lives in Lowell
- 1995 – Lock Up: The Prisoners of Riker's Island
- 1998 – Canal Street: First Stop In America
- 1998 – A Cinderella Season: The Lady Vols Fight Back
- 2001 – Campaign Confidential
- 2001 – Papa
- 2002 – Afghanistan: From Ground Zero to Ground Zero
- 2003 – Bridge to Baghdad I
- 2003 – Bridge to Baghdad II
- 2003 – Coca and the Congressman
- 2003 – Latin Kings: A Street Gang Story
- 2004 – Dope Sick Love
- 2005 – Bullets in the Hood: A Bed-Stuy Story
- 2005 – The Last Cowboy
- 2005 – Off to War (1–10)
- 2005 – Siberian Adoption Story
- 2005 – Venezuela: Revolution in Progress
- 2006 – Baghdad ER
- 2006 – India Journal
- 2007 – The Bridge
- 2007 – The Russians are Coming!!!
- 2008 – Dirty Driving
- 2008 – A Woman Among Boys: A Brooklyn Basketball Story
- 2009 – China's Unnatural Disaster: The Tears of Sichuan Province
- 2009 – "Section 60: Arlington National Cemetery"
- 2010 – "WARTORN: 1861–2010"
- 2017 – Cuba and the Cameraman
- 2018-2021 – Axios
- 2020 – Raising Baby Grey
- 2021 – Life of Crime: 1984-2020
- 2022 – Shut Up and Paint
