= National Aquarium =

There are several institutions known as the National Aquarium:

== Africa ==
- National Marine Aquarium of Namibia

== Asia ==
- National Museum of Marine Biology and Aquarium, Taiwan

== Europe ==
- National Aquarium Denmark
- National Marine Aquarium, Plymouth, England

== North America ==
- National Aquarium (Baltimore), U.S.
- National Aquarium (Washington, D.C.), U.S.

== Oceania ==
- National Aquarium of New Zealand
- National Zoo & Aquarium, Canberra, Australia
