= KSLG-FM =

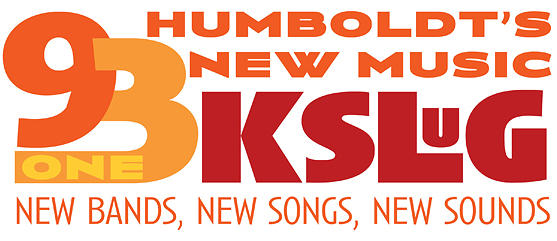
- Ferndale, California; United States
- Broadcast area: Eureka, California
- Frequency: 93.1 MHz
- Branding: K-Slug, Humboldt's New Music

Programming
- Format: Alternative rock

Ownership
- Owner: Lost Coast Communications, Inc.

History
- First air date: May 1, 2001 (on 94.1 MHz)
- Former frequencies: 94.1 MHz (2001–2014)

Technical information
- Licensing authority: FCC
- Facility ID: 71700
- Class: C
- ERP: 50,000 watts
- HAAT: 508 meters
- Transmitter coordinates: 40.7269°N 123.9739°W

Links
- Public license information: Public file; LMS
- Webcast: Listen Live
- Website: kslg.com

KSLG is a commercial Independent music and Alternative radio station in Ferndale, California, broadcasting to the Eureka, California, area on 93.1 FM. KSLG is branded as K-Slug, which refers to the banana slugs native to the region. Its parent company is Lost Coast Communications, Inc. with sister stations KHUM, KLGE and KWPT.

== History ==
KSLG-FM launched on May 1, 2001, three years after Lost Coast Communications secured the license from the FCC. Lost Coast Communications paid another radio operator, Eureka Broadcasting, US$70,000 to withdraw a bid for the 94.1 frequency, then had to secure investors to begin operating.

In 2013 the station shifted from playing a mix of current and dated Modern rock to mostly new Independent music and Alternative with a majority of the playlist only dating back a few years. The playlist features some more recognizable artists, listener submissions, artists with smaller followings, non-singles, deep cuts and artists with little to no money behind them.

The station uses their website, Facebook and Twitter and Instagram as tools to connect with listeners in the Humboldt County area. They also actively use the airwaves and social networks for giveaways and contests.
