= Third Avenue: Only the Strong Survive =

1980 documentary television film

Third Avenue: Only the Strong Survive is a television documentary that originally aired on April 11, 1980. It was directed by Jon Alpert and Keiko Tsuno for New York Channel 13.

== Plot ==
The film details the lives of six people who live on Third Avenue in New York City. The individuals are a car thief, a Bowery homeless man, a mother on welfare, a male prostitute, a factory employee, and a barber.

== Reception ==
Tom Shales of The Washington Post said, "This program is essentially about whatever it is that makes people stand up and curse and dare anybody to trample them again." The film won two Emmy Awards.
