= Zoobomb =

Weekly bicycling activity in Portland, Oregon, United States

- Zoobomb logo
- Genre: Bicycling
- Frequency: Weekly
- Locations: Portland, Oregon, USA
- Years active: Since 2002; 24 years ago
- Participants: Over 100 (as of 2005)
- Website: zoobomb.net

Zoobomb is a weekly bicycling activity in Portland, Oregon, United States during which participants ride bicycles rapidly downhill in the city's West Hills. Zoobomb began in 2002.

Participants carry their bikes on MAX Light Rail to the Washington Park station next to the Oregon Zoo. From there, participants take the elevator to the surface and then ride their bikes down the hills in the vicinity. This process is often repeated several times throughout the night.

== Culture ==
The people that are going 35-mph-plus have backgrounds in BMX, mountain biking, bike messengering or downhill skateboarding. I don't know that people showing up for the first time understand this.

— Zoobomber Mark Verno in August 2005

There is an emphasis on unusual bicycles, first and foremost the children's bicycles or "minibikes," but extending to tall bikes, swing bikes, choppers, non-functional bicycles, skateboards, longboards, etc.

== Zoobomb Pile ==
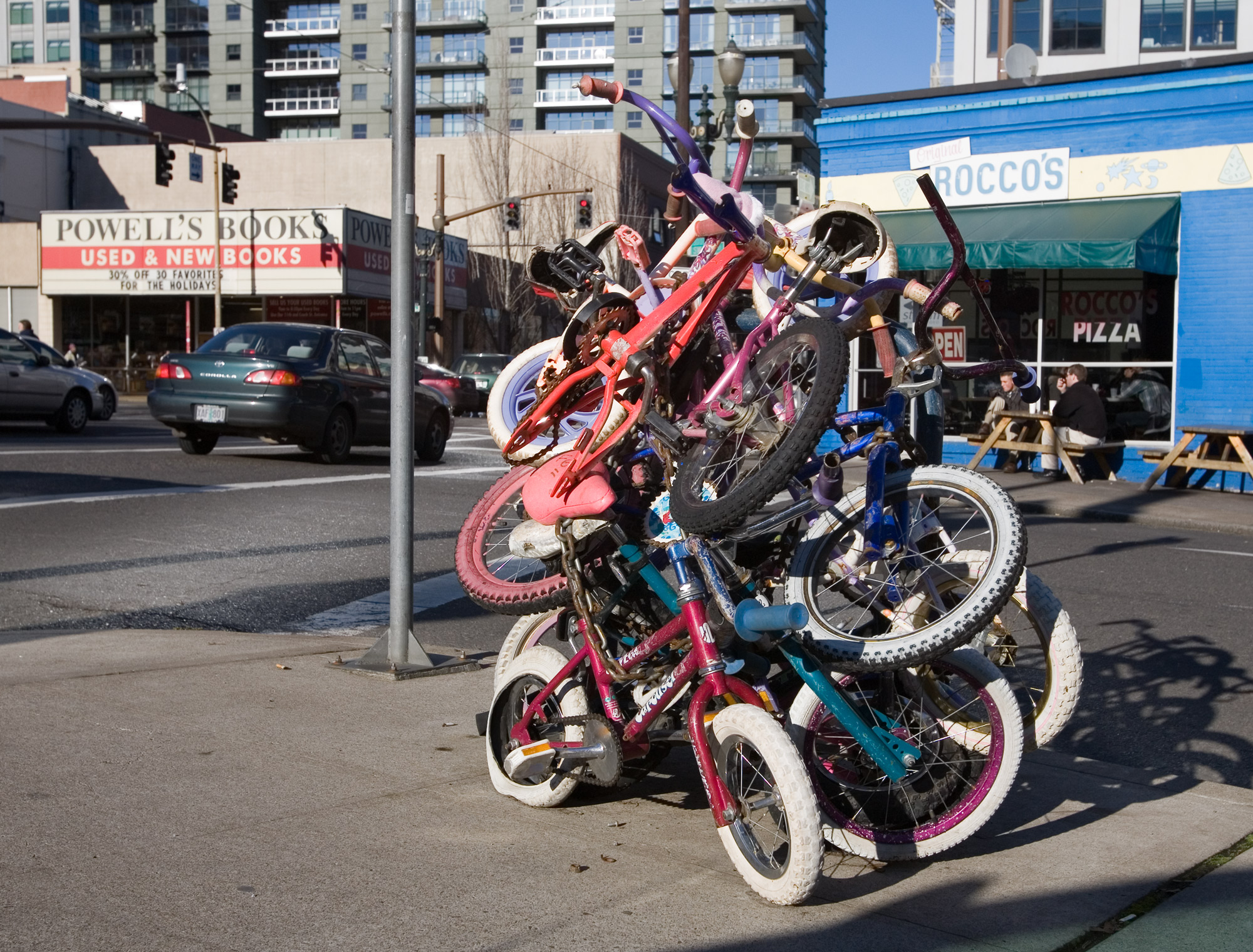
The Zoobomb pile, the meeting point for participants (December 2007); the pile is located near Powell's City of Books, seen in the background, at left.

Though many riders bring their own bicycles, the participants maintain a "Zoobomb pile". This is a tower of minibikes anchored to a bicycle rack at the Zoobomb meeting point. These are spare bikes that are used as loaners for would-be Zoobombers who don't have their own bike. The pile has become a local landmark.

In March 2009, a new pile was dedicated, in a ceremony attended by Portland mayor Sam Adams. The new pile is located at SW 13th and Burnside.

== Related events ==
There are several annual events hosted by Zoobomb organizers and participants, including:

- Zoobomb Century in June
- MiniBikeWinter in February
- Zoobomb Summer Olympics (aka BiffDay) in August
- Alleykitten Invitational

Zoobomb has inspired Hoodbomb, where participants gather at the Timberline Lodge and bomb the 5.5-mile (8.9 km) course of Timberline Road on Mount Hood.

== See also ==
- Culture of Portland, Oregon
- Portland Urban Iditarod
- Idiotarod
- Kinetic sculpture race
- Shopping cart race
