= Jon Alpert =

American journalist & documentary filmmaker (born c.1948)

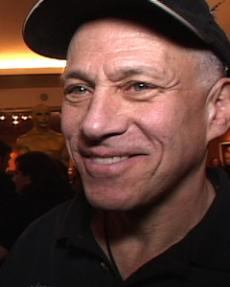
- Alpert in 2010
- Born: December 13, 1948 (age 77); United States
- Occupations: Journalist, film director

Jon Alpert (born c. December 13, 1948) is an American journalist and documentary filmmaker, known for his use of a cinéma vérité approach in his films.

== Life and career ==
A native of Port Chester, New York, Jonathan B. Alpert is a 1970 graduate of Colgate University, and has a 4th degree black belt in karate. In fact he once won the North American team-kumite Karate Championship despite fighting with three broken ribs.

Alpert has traveled widely as an investigative journalist and has reported from Vietnam, Cambodia, Iran, Nicaragua, the Philippines, Cuba, China, and Afghanistan. He has made films for NBC, PBS, and HBO. Over the course of his career, he has won 17 National Emmy Awards, ranging from Best Investigative Reporting to Best Sports Documentary. Uniquely, he has won National Emmy Awards in every craft category: Cinematography, Directing, Editing and Sound. Alpert has also won four DuPont-Columbia Awards and a Peabody Award. He has been nominated for a 2010 Academy Award in the category of Best Documentary, Short Subject for China's Unnatural Disaster: The Tears of Sichuan Province. He was nominated for a 2013 Academy Award in the same category for Redemption. Alpert won the Erikson Institute Prize for Excellence in Mental Health Media with co-director Ellen Goosenberg Kent for their documentary War Torn: 1861-2010.

In 1972, Alpert and his wife, Keiko Tsuno, founded the non-profit organization, Downtown Community Television Center (DCTV), one of the country's first community media centers. DCTV is housed in a landmark firehouse in New York City. DCTV's programs have trained more than 70,000 people over the course of its 50-year history, most of them members of low-income and minority communities. DCTV offers over 150 low-cost video and electronic media training workshops a year. The most accomplished of their students are DCTV's High School Media Fellows. They have won local Emmy Awards, the Sundance Film Festival jury prize, and the R.F.K. Journalism award.

In 1974, Alpert and Tsuno made Cuba: The People. Neither he nor Tsuno knew anything about film and couldn't afford to learn, so they chose to use video. "Keiko's brother would literally go to the factory, and as the first color portapak was coming off JVC's assembly line, we'd get serial number one of everything," Alpert said. According to Alpert, the film was the first independently produced color documentary recorded on video. Jon Alpert ended up interviewing Fidel Castro several times. Over the years, Alpert repeatedly visited Cuba, and his footage from 45 years of filming in Cuba came together in the 2017 Netflix documentary, Cuba and the Cameraman, which provides a look at the revolution and Cuba's recent history through the eyes of 3 Cuban families and Fidel Castro.

Between 1979 and 1991, Alpert was the sole freelance video documentarist regularly featured on network television. His reports for NBC's The Today Show and Nightly News offered mass audiences a view of domestic and international affairs from a decidedly decentered perspective.

In 1991, while employed by NBC, Alpert was the first American journalist to bring back uncensored video footage from the first Persian Gulf War. The footage, much of it focusing on civilian casualties, was cancelled three hours before it was supposed to be aired, and Alpert was fired soon after. Later that year, CBS Evening News Executive Producer Tom Bettag planned to air the footage but this airing was also cancelled, and Bettag was fired. Jon Alpert was one of the few Western journalists to have conducted a videotaped interview with Saddam Hussein since the Persian Gulf War. In 1992, he received the prize "Archivio Disarmo - Golden Doves for Peace" from IRIAD.

Alpert has been nominated for an Oscar award on two occasions, once in 2010 for Documentary short, China's Unnatural Disaster: The Tears of Sichuan Province (HBO) and again in 2013 for Redemption (HBO).

In 2021, HBO Max debut Alpert's Life of Crime: 1984-2020 documentary, a thirty-six year chronicle of criminal and drug addicts in Newark, New Jersey. It was nominated for a 2021 Peabody Award, won a National News & Documentary Emmy in the category of Outstanding Crime and Justice Documentary and won the Venice Film Festival "Ambassador of Hope" award.

In 2022 Alpert's non-profit DCTV opened the Firehouse Cinema, one of the few documentary centric cinemas in the world. The theater features first run, curated, repertory, masterclasses and family programs.

Alpert has broken almost every bone in his body pursuing his hobbies of playing hockey, doing karate and getting bucked off horses.

== Films ==
- 1974: Cuba: The People
- 1976: Chinatown: Immigrants in America (co-producer)
- 1977: Vietnam: Picking up the Pieces (Co-director/Co-producer)
- 1980: Third Avenue: Only the Strong Survive (Director)
- 1984: Hard Metal Disease (Producer/Director/Cinematographer/Sound)
- 1985: Vietnam: Talking to the people
- 1987: Junkie Junior (Director/Cinematographer/camera operator)
- 1989: One Year in A Life of Crime (Director/Producer) for America Undercover, (part of the Life of Crime (documentary trilogy))
- 1991: Rape: Cries from the Heartland (Executive Producer)
- 1991: Nowhere to hide (Producer/Director/Cinematographer)
- 1995: High on Crack Street: Lost Lives in Lowell (Cinematographer/Producer) for America Undercover
- 1995: Lock-up: The Prisoners of Rikers Island
- 1998: Life of Crime 2 (part of the Life of Crime (documentary trilogy))
- 1998: A Cinderella Season: The Lady Vols Fight Back
- 2002: To Have and Have Not (Director)
- 2002: Afghanistan: From Ground Zero to Ground Zero (Director)
- 2002: Papa (Director/Producer)
- 2003: Latin Kings: A Street Gang Story (Director/Editor/Cinematographer/Producer)
- 2003: Coca and the Congressman (Director)
- 2004: The Last Cowboy (Director)
- 2004: Dope Sick Love (Executive Producer)
- 2004: Off to War (Executive Producer)
- 2004: Bullets in the Hood: A Bed-Stuy Story (Executive Producer)
- 2005: Venezuela: Revolution in Progress (Cinematographer)
- 2006: Baghdad ER (Director/Producer)
- 2007: Alive Day Memories: Home from Iraq (Producer/Director/Cinematographer)
- 2007: The Bridge TV Show (Executive Producer/Cinematographer)
- 2008: Section 60: Arlington National Cemetery (Co-Director/Co-Producer)
- 2008: Dirty Driving: Thundercars of Indiana (Director/Producer)
- 2008: A Woman Among Boys (Co-Director/Co-Producer)
- 2009: China's Unnatural Disaster: The Tears of Sichuan Province (Co-Director/Co-Producer)
- 2012: In Tahrir Square (Co-Director/Co-Producer)
- 2013: Redemption (Co-Director)
- 2014: The Other Man: F.W. de Klerk and the End of Apartheid (Executive Producer)
- 2015: The Latin Explosion: A New America (Director/Producer)
- 2016: Banking on Bitcoin (Producer)
- 2016: Mariela Castro's March (Director/Producer)
- 2017: Rock and a Hard Place (Director/Producer)
- 2017: Cuba and the Cameraman (Director/Producer/Writer)
- 2018: All for One (Co-Director)
- 2019: Finding the Way Home (Producer/Director/Cinematographer/Sound)
- 2021: Life of Crime 1984-2020 (part of the Life of Crime (documentary trilogy))
- 2025: Armed only with a Camera: The Life and Death of Brent Renaud
