= KWPT =

- Fortuna, California; United States
- Broadcast area: Eureka, California
- Frequency: 100.3 MHz
- Branding: The Point

Programming
- Format: Classic rock/hits

Ownership
- Owner: KWPT, Inc

History
- First air date: 1992
- Call sign meaning: PT for "Point"

Technical information
- Licensing authority: FCC
- Facility ID: 49308
- Class: C1
- ERP: 12,000 watts
- HAAT: 577.2 meters
- Transmitter coordinates: 40°25′29.8″N 124°06′23.4″W
- Translator: 102.9 K275BI (Eureka)

Links
- Public license information: Public file; LMS
- Webcast: Listen Live
- Website: kwpt.com

KWPT is a commercial classic rock/hits music radio station licensed to Fortuna, California, broadcasting to the Eureka, California area on 100.3 FM. It is owned by KWPT, Inc. KWPT also serves Eureka, California, on translator K275BI at 102.9 FM.

== History ==
KWPT carried a Rhythmic Top 40 format previous to the current classic rock/hits format and was known as The Party. Before that it aired a Smooth Jazz format. All formats on KWPT have been locally executed, which is unique for the Eureka, CA metro market.

== Personalities ==
KWPT The Point's airstaff includes: Jay in the morning and Chuck Rogers afternoons. Previous DJs include Carole Ann, Janet Carney, and Andy Powell. The programming is generated entirely from the Ferndale, California studios.
