= Carts of Darkness =

- Directed by: Murray Siple
- Written by: Murray Siple
- Produced by: Tracey Friesen
- Cinematography: Christian Bégin
- Edited by: Michael Brockington
- Production company: National Film Board of Canada
- Release date: 2008
- Country: Canada

Carts of Darkness is a 2008 documentary film produced by the National Film Board of Canada, written and directed by Murray Siple. The film follows a group of homeless men in North Vancouver who use shopping carts to collect bottles and cans to return for deposit refunds and to race down the city's steep slopes for thrills.

The subjects control the carts using only their body weight and one foot during descents that cross intersections, with top speeds claimed to reach up to 70 km/h.

Siple, a former director of extreme sports videos and an avid skateboarder and snowboarder, became a quadriplegic after a car accident in 1996. His first film after his accident, Carts of Darkness allowed the filmmaker to regain the excitement he had experienced with extreme sports and to relate to a fellow group of outsiders.

== Reception ==
Carts of Darkness was shown at public screenings in Vancouver and Victoria, with the film's subjects in attendance. It was also selected for the Hot Docs Canadian International Documentary Festival. The film received the Leo Award for Best Documentary Program in the Nature/ Environment/Adventure/Science/Technology category as well as the award for best documentary over 30 minutes at the Picture This Film Festival in Calgary.

== See also ==
- Shameless: The ART of Disability
- Redemption, a 2012 documentary film about people who redeem bottles and cans in New York City
