= Redwood Park =

Redwood Park may refer to:

- Redwood National and State Parks, located in California, United States
- Redwood Park, South Australia
- Redwood Park (Arcata, California), a municipal park containing Coast Redwoods and public buildings in the city of Arcata, California, United States. The park is contiguous in its location at the western edge of the Arcata Community Forest.
