= Eureka Theater =

- U.S. National Register of Historic Places
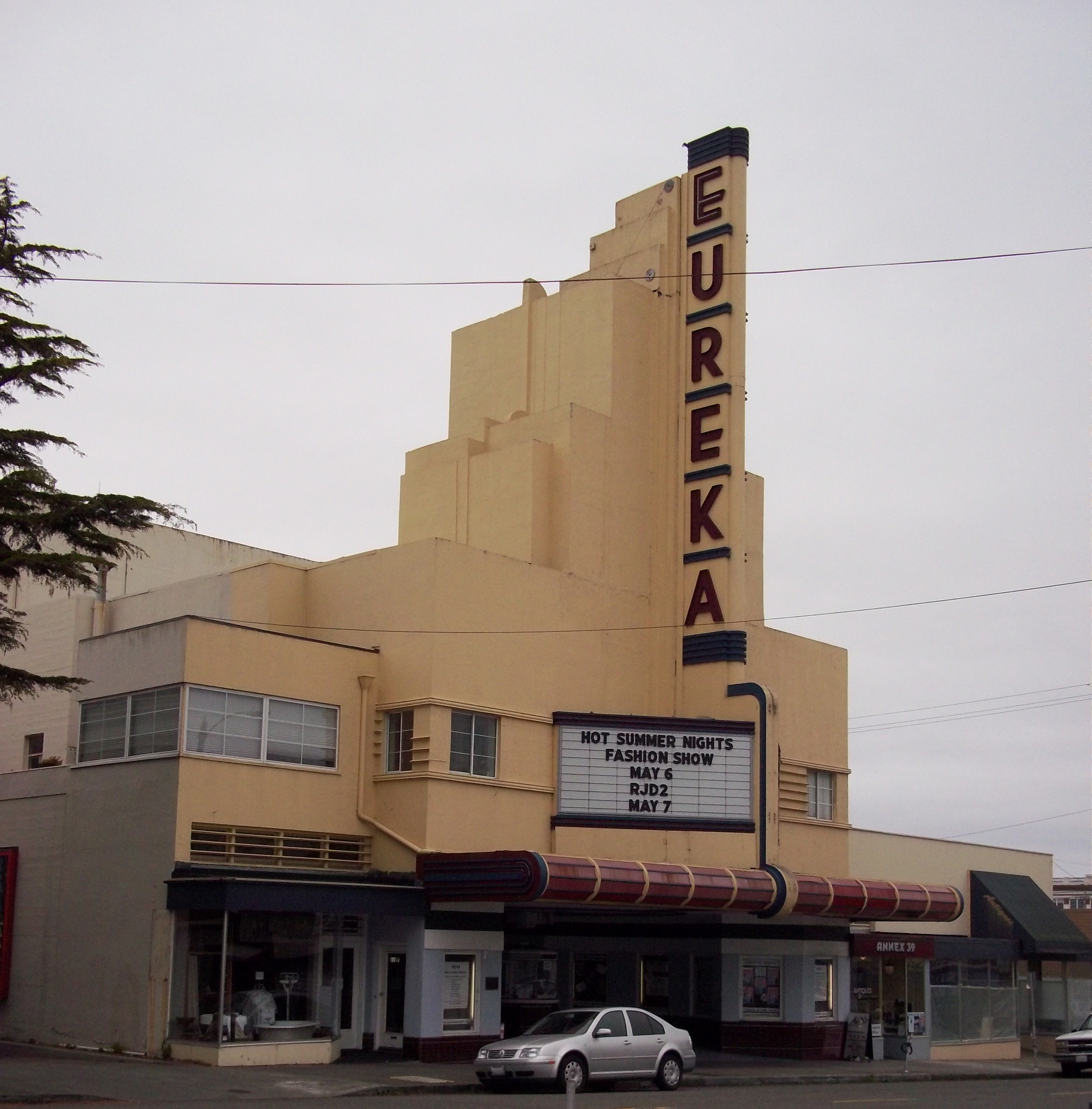

- Location within California Location within the United States
- Location: 612 F. St., Eureka, California
- Coordinates: 40°48′3″N 124°9′53″W
- Area: less than one acre
- Built by: Moore & Roberts
- Architect: William B. David
- Architectural style: Art Moderne
- NRHP reference No.: 09001199
- Added to NRHP: January 7, 2010

The Eureka Theater is an Art Moderne–style cinema built in 1939 in Eureka, California. The movie theater was initially proposed in 1937 as part of a larger development that would include a five-story, 162-room hotel, which was soon scaled back to the theater with flanking commercial spaces. Built by theater magnate George M. Mann, the theater was designed by noted San Francisco designer William B. David, who had once worked in the Metro-Goldwyn-Mayer Art Department in the mid-1930s. The Eureka Theater was considered an ultra-modern movie theater when constructed in 1939 and was an expression of optimism and confidence in Eureka and Humboldt County, California as they pulled out of the Depression. The Eureka Theater ceased showing regularly scheduled movies on August 1, 1996. The theater is currently undergoing restoration, and is available for rent as a performance or event venue.

== Description ==
The Eureka Theater features a symmetrical stucco facade built of cubic forms rising to a 50-foot (15 m) tall vertical pylon sign bearing the letters EUREKA over the theater's marquee. At ground level the lobby entrance is centered between storefronts. The lobby is overhung by a projecting canopy with a rolled edge. A V-shaped attraction board rests on the marquee and appears to support the pylon. The complex pylon mounts in receding block forms as it rises. Although it appears to be a monolith, it is actually supported by a frame structure with a stucco appliqué. The second floor features subsidiary blocks with smaller windows and accent lines, housing the owner's apartment.

The outer lobby is a shallow semicircle with a mosaic tile floor extending to the sidewalk. The walls have a maroon subway tile wainscot, with chrome tile accent stripes. A large light fixture with chrome accents is centered over the octagonal ticket booth. The booth has tile that matches the outer lobby wainscot. A blue glass pane above the ticket window is designed to be illuminated when the box office is open for business. The lobby is flanked by storefront spaces, whose transom windows are accented by a horizontal grillage. The other elevations are comparatively plain, with large concrete surfaces.

The inner foyer is narrow, less than 6 feet (1.8 m) wide, with a number of Art Moderne details. The entrance doors retain their original custom hardware of brass and Bakelite. The ceiling is extensively detailed. The foyer leads to the grand lobby, which is approximately oval, accented by a stepped curving ceiling detail and a central light fixture with multicolored glass. Columns flanking the entrance feature glazed panels that match the light fixture, and which can themselves be illuminated.

The Eureka Theater was placed on the National Register of Historic Places on January 7, 2010.

== See also ==
Arcata Theatre
