= Steven C. Hackett =

American economist (born 1960)

- Born: 1960 (age 65–66); United States
- Education: Texas A&M University Ph.D 1989; Texas A&M University MS 1986; Montana State University BS 1983
- Scientific career
- Fields: Economist
- Workplaces: Cal Poly Humboldt

Steven C. Hackett (born 1960) is an American economist, and professor emeritus of Economics at Cal Poly Humboldt (formerly Humboldt State University), known for his contributions to the fields of environmental and natural resources economics.

== Biography ==
Born and raised in Arcata, California in 1960, Hackett obtained his BS in Agricultural Business and Economics at the Montana State University in 1983. He then moved to the Texas A&M University, where he obtained his MS in economics 1986, and his PhD in economics in 1989.

Hackett began his academic career at the rank of assistant professor at Indiana University in Bloomington in 1989. In 1994 he then moved to the Humboldt State University, where he started as assistant professor at its School of Business and Economics. There in 1997 he became associate professor, and in 2002 professor at the department of economics.

At the Humboldt State University among others Hackett was co-founder of the Humboldt Economic Index, which he directed from 1996 to 2002. In 2002 he was founding director of its Office for Economic, Community, and Business Development. He chaired the department of economics first time in the years 2004–2006, secondly in 2013–2016, and again since 2017.

== Work ==
=== Early research ===
Early on Hackett's research was focused on the economic performance of contractual relationships, such as the social dilemmas associated with common-pool resources like oil and gas fields, groundwater basins or marine fisheries. Self-interested or opportunistic behavior in these circumstances can result in inferior economic outcomes. This work began at Texas A&M and was further cultivated by his affiliation with Nobel Laureate Elinor Ostrom's Workshop in Political Theory and Policy Analysis while a member of the graduate faculty at Indiana University in Bloomington.

He was particularly interested in the challenges of structuring successful agreements capable of preventing opportunistic behavior when stakeholders are heterogeneous, or have made prior relationship-specific investments (research influenced by the work of Nobel Laureate Oliver Williamson). His research approaches involved developing theoretical models and evaluating testable hypotheses through the use of laboratory experimental methods. Another line of his research involved the use of economic modeling approaches to understand the political economy of environmental regulation.

In several papers Hackett and collaborators investigated how voluntary actions by firms to limit pollution can have strategic value relative to competitors, or as a way of shaping future regulatory policy. In another line of research Hackett and colleagues developed a model for the partial deregulation of critical energy markets, such as for natural gas, and identified some of the hazards associated with applying that model to electricity deregulation.

Hackett's curiosity about contracting problems also resulted in papers on diverse topics such as revenue-sharing problems in medical group practices, and factors that influence foreign direct investment decisions by multinational firms.

=== More recent research ===
More recently Hackett has worked collaboratively on a number of projects addressing marine fishery economics and policy and renewable energy. In various projects he has analyzed California's wetfish industry complex, California's Dungeness crab fishery and associated processing sector, and the California and Oregon salmon fisheries. In 2009 his research team released the COFHE model for assessing economic impact in each of California's commercial marine fisheries. Unique models were developed to function at county, regional, and statewide scales.

Hackett has also returned to energy economics, with a focus on renewable energy and energy efficiency. He recently contributed a chapter to California's wave energy white paper. He is collaborating with the Schatz Energy Research Center and the Redwood Coast Energy Authority on a California Energy Commission-funded project that will identify ways to create a renewable energy secure community by managing the Humboldt micro-grid with 75 to 100 percent of energy supplies derived from renewable sources.

In recognition of his research into regional economic issues, and what former HSU President Rollin Richmond described as "the clarity and significance his work brings to global questions of environmental economics," Hackett was selected as Humboldt State University's Scholar of the Year for 2005.

== Selected Literature ==
1990s

- Hackett, S., "Heterogeneity and the Provision of Governance for Common-Pool Resources," Journal of Theoretical Politics, July 1992, 4, 325–42.
- Hackett, S., “A Comparative Analysis of Merchant and Broker Intermediation,” Journal of Economic Behavior and Organization, August 1992, 18, 299–315.
- Hackett, S., "Consignment Contracting," Journal of Economic Behavior and Organization, February 1993, 20, 247–53.
- Hackett, S., "Incomplete Contracting: A Laboratory Experimental Analysis," Economic Inquiry, April 1993, 31, 274–97.
- Lyon, T., and S. Hackett, "Bottlenecks and Governance Structures: Open Access and Long Term Contracting in Natural Gas," Journal of Law, Economics, and Organization, October 1993, 9, 380–98.
- Hackett, S., E. Schlager, and J. Walker, "The Role of Communication in Resolving Commons Dilemmas: Experimental Evidence with Heterogeneous Appropriators," Journal of Environmental Economics and Management, 1994, 27, 99–126.
- Hackett, S., "Is Relational Exchange Possible in the Absence of Reputations and Repeated Contact?" Journal of Law, Economics, and Organization, October 1994, 10, 360–89.
- Hackett, S., "Pollution-Controlling Innovation in Oligopolistic Industries: Some Comparisons Between Patent Races and Research Joint Ventures," Journal of Environmental Economics and Management, November 1995, 29(3), pp. 339–356.

2000s

- Maxwell, J., T. Lyon and S. Hackett, "Self-Regulation and Social Welfare: The Political Economy of Corporate Environmentalism," Journal of Law and Economics October 2000, 43, pp. 583–618.
- Dewees, C., K. Sortais, S. Hackett, M. Krachey, and D. Hankin. "Racing for Crabs: Costs and Management Options in Dungeness Crab Fishery," California Agriculture, October–December 2004, 58, pp. 186–93.
- Hackett, S., D. Hankin, M. Krachey, and S. Brown. "Derby Fisheries, Individual Quotas, and Transition in the Fish Processing Industry," Marine Resource Economics, April 2005, 20, pp. 47–60.
- Hackett, S., Environmental and Natural Resources Economics: Theory, Policy, and the Sustainable Society, 3rd Edition (New York: M.E. Sharpe, 2006).
- Kellermann, J., M. Johnson, A. Stercho, and S. Hackett. "Ecological and Economic Services Provided by Birds on Jamaican Blue Mountain Coffee Farms," Conservation Biology, 22(5), 2008, 1177 - 1185.
- Hackett, S. "Economic and Social Considerations for Wave Energy Development in California." In P. Nelson and L. Engeman (eds.) Developing Wave Energy in Coastal California: Potential Socio-Economic and Environmental Effects. California Energy Commission Report CEC-500-2008-083. Sacramento, CA: California Energy Commission, 2008, 23–49.
- Hackett, S., and M. Hansen. “Cost and Revenue Characteristics of the Salmon Fisheries in California and Oregon.” Technical Report under Contract 8404-S-004, National Marine Fisheries Service, Washington, DC. 2008.
- Hackett, S., D. King, M. Hansen, and E. Price. “The Economic Structure of California’s Commercial Fisheries.” Technical Report under Contract P0670015, California Department of Fish and Game, Sacramento, CA. 2009.
