= Cal Poly Humboldt Natural History Museum =

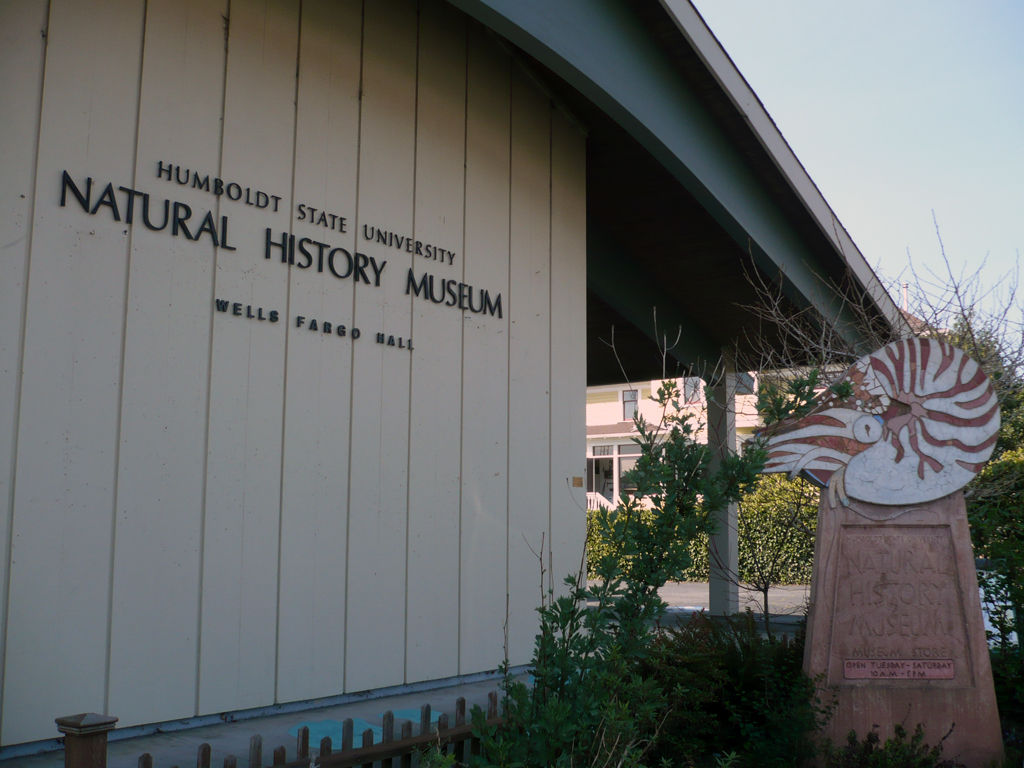
- The museum at its original location

- Location within California
- Location: Arcata, California, United States
- Coordinates: 40.872255°N 124.084819°W
- Type: natural history museum
- Collection size: 2,000
- Director: Julie Van Sickle
- Website: natmus.humboldt.edu

Cal Poly Humboldt Natural History Museum is a natural history museum on the campus of the California State Polytechnic University, Humboldt in Arcata, California in the United States.

== History ==
Wells Fargo Bank donated the original location of the museum to Humboldt State University (HSU).

Around 2010, the university was unable to continue to fund the operations of the museum. The museum closed. Eventually, the Humboldt Science Mathematics Center/Redwood Science Project took over the management and the museum reopened. Jeffrey White became the executive director and Julie Van Sickle the Manager. Museum administrators sought grants and public support in order to sustain itself. In 2013, it was announced that the museum would move from its original location into the location where it is currently located. The new building was donated by Redwood Capital Bank. It is 2,700 square feet in size. The museum's former building is now a Redwood Capital Bank branch location.

== Collections ==
The museum has over 2,000 natural history objects. Collections include Native American cultural objects. They have a large fossil collection, called the Maloney Fossil Collection, including sand dollars and Busycon contrarium from the Pliocene and a Chlamys from the Miocene. Other exhibits include the Life Through Time exhibit, a series of thirteen display cases that illustrates the beginnings of the Earth from its earliest history to the present day. There are also online exhibits available to view, and the museum hosts Science and Nature youth summer camps where credentialed teaching NHM staff and students of the school who have been trained through the college's internship program will teach children about various scientific disciplines.

== Exhibitions ==
Students from Cal Poly Humboldt assist in the design and curation of exhibitions at the museum. Many exhibits are interactive. Visitors can touch a meteorite, fossils, and dinosaur bone casts. Most of the exhibitions focus on the natural history of the region surrounding the museum.
