= Robert A. Gearheart =

- Born: Robert Arthur Gearheart
- Education: North Texas State University (B.A., 1964); University of Oklahoma (M.S., 1965; Ph.D., 1969)
- Awards: ASCE Environmental Engineer of the Year Award; Cal Poly Humboldt Distinguished Faculty Award (1995); Ford Foundation Innovation in Government Award (Group recipient for Arcata Marsh)
- Engineering career
- Discipline: Environmental engineering, civil engineering, ecological engineering, wastewater treatment
- Practice name: Cal Poly Humboldt (Professor Emeritus of Environmental Resources Engineering)
- Projects: Arcata Marsh and Wildlife Sanctuary; International wastewater-to-wetlands conversion projects (USAID)
- Significant design: Multi-stage constructed wetland systems using natural biological processes for municipal wastewater purification

Robert A. (Bob) Gearheart (born 1938) is an emeritus professor of environmental engineering at Cal Poly Humboldt, in Arcata, California.

Gearheart teaches courses in environmental impact assessment, hazardous waste management, water quality management, and Capstone.

His research interests include water and wastewater treatment using appropriate technology, including constructed wetlands. He has been actively involved with a number of public and private sector agencies providing technical support for water supply and decentralized sanitation facilities in developing countries, including Indonesia, Kenya, Ghana, and Sierra Leone.

Gearheart is involved with the development of Arcata's Integrated Wetland and Wastewater Treatment Facility and the Arcata Marsh. The Arcata Marsh serves as a sewage treatment plant, a recreation area, a wildlife sanctuary and aquaculture project.

Gearheart earned a Bachelor of Arts in biology and mathematics from North Texas State University in 1964. He went on to attend the University of Oklahoma, where he received his Master of Science in 1965 and a Ph.D. in civil engineering in 1969.
