= Explorations in Afro-Cuban Dance and Drum =

The annual Explorations in Afro-Cuban Dance & Drum workshops were founded by Howie Kaufman and are hosted by the Humboldt State University Office of Extended Education in Arcata, California. The classes focus on Afro-Cuban folkloric song, dance, and percussion and brings together some of the world's top AfroCuban folkloric dancers and drummers.

== The politics of Cubans teaching at Humboldt State University ==
Despite the United States embargo against Cuba, a slight relaxation allowed the Afro-Cuban folkloric group Los Muñequitos de Matanzas to tour the United States in 1992. The 1992 Muñequitos tour also established the small California college town of Arcata as a preferable venue for touring Cuban groups. Los Muñequitos performed, and gave dance and drum classes in Arcata in 1992, 1994, and 1998. Beginning in 1996, Humboldt State University invited touring Cuban folkloric masters to teach at their Explorations workshop. Eventually, the University obtained visas for Cuban teachers, and brought them directly from the island to the workshop.

== Workshops ==
Each year the Humboldt State campus hosts the largest assemblage of Afro-Cuban folkloric dance and drum masters in the United States. Song instruction includes the Lucumí and Iyesá (Santería), Arará, Palo, and rumba traditions. Styles of dance include Santería, Arará, Palo (religion), and rumba, in both the Havana and Matanzas styles, as well as "Haitiano" genres, and salsa (dance). Percussion instruction includes batá drums (three levels), conga drums, quinto, shekere, and cajón. Some instruction in Cuban popular styles (salsa music, timba, Latin jazz, etc.) of congas, bongos, timbales, drumset are also offered.

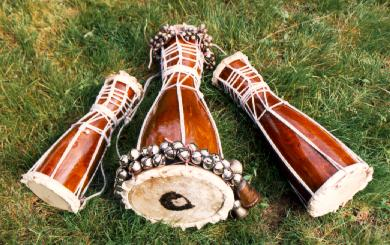
Batá drums. From left: okónkolo, iyá, itótele. Photo: Harold Muñiz

=== Grupo Exploración ===
In the summer of 2000, Explorations faculty members Miguel Bernal, Juan Brown, Michael Spiro, Harold Muniz, and "Chichito" Cepeda recorded a CD of instrumental experimental folklore. With no singing, the melody of the tuned drums provide the thematic focus of the music. The results were released as the CD Drum Jam (Descarga al tambor) on Bembe Records (2026-2).

=== Rumbones ===
Although not an official part of the course, there are informal rumbones ('rumba parties') nearly every night. These are typically held off-campus, at various homes in the community. Shortly after the 2009 beach party began, local neighbors called the police, complaining about the drumming. Since then, the Tuesday night rumbones have occurred a few miles south, at Mad River Beach. The new location is not near any residences, and therefore, does not violate Arcata's famous "Bongo Ordinance."
