= Arcata Wastewater Treatment Plant and Wildlife Sanctuary =

Facility in Arcata, California

Coordinates: 40.858341°N 124.090728°W

Arcata Wastewater Treatment Plant and Wildlife Sanctuary is an innovative sewer management system employed by the city of Arcata, California.

A series of oxidation ponds, treatment wetlands and enhancement marshes are used to filter sewage waste. The marshes also serve as a wildlife refuge, and are on the Pacific Flyway. The Arcata Marsh is a popular destination for birders. The marsh has been awarded the Innovations in Government award from the Ford Foundation/Harvard Kennedy School. Numerous holding pools in the marsh, called "lakes," are named after donors and citizens who helped start the marsh project, including Cal Poly Humboldt professors George Allen and Robert A. Gearheart who were instrumental in the creation of the Arcata Marsh. In 1969 Allen also started an aquaculture project at the marsh to raise salmonids in mixtures of sea water and partially treated wastewater. Despite being effectively a sewer, the series of open-air lakes do not have an odor, and are a popular destination for birdwatching, cycling and jogging.

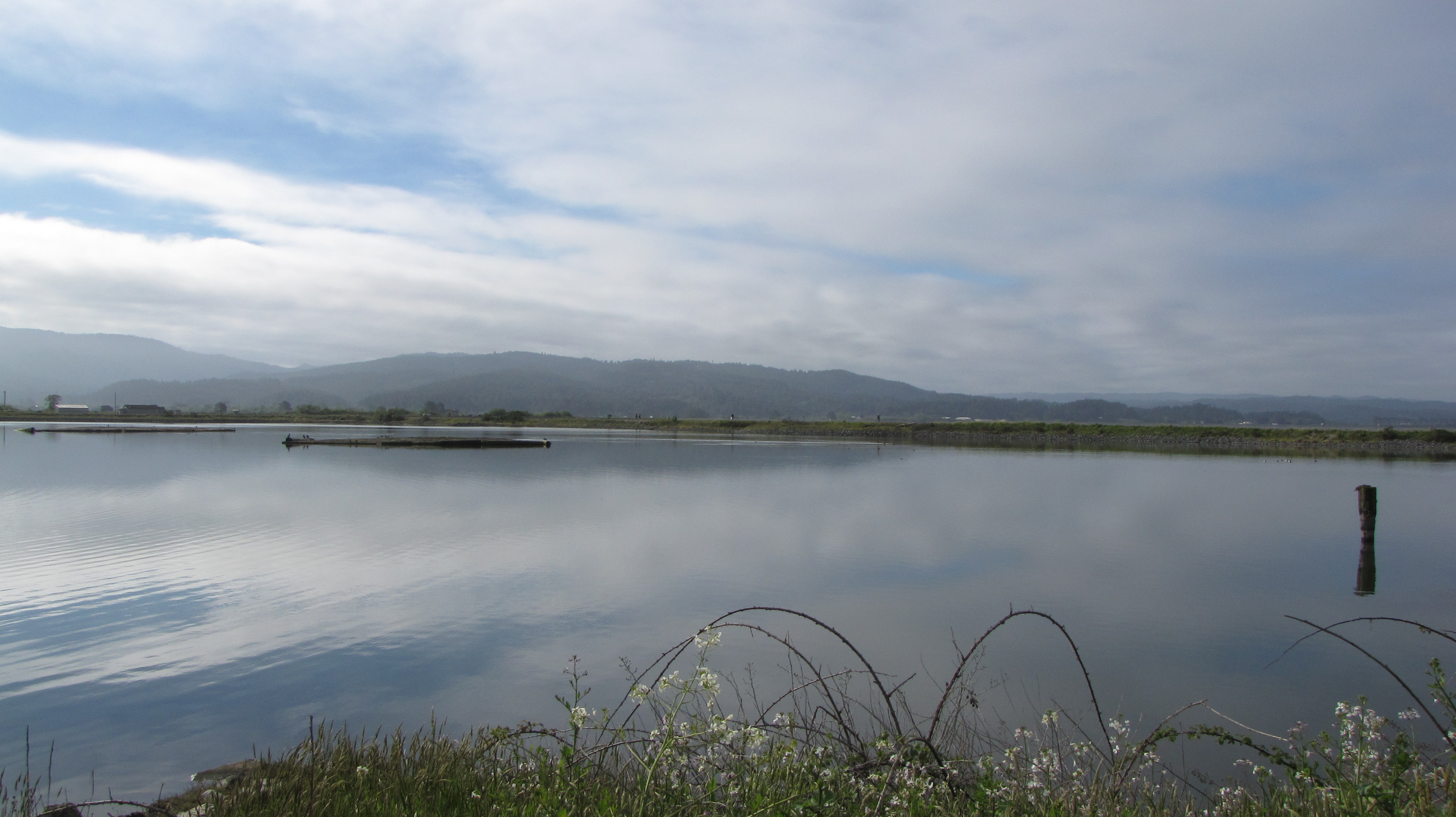
View over southern end of Arcata Marsh.

== Sewage treatment ==
The sewage treatment process takes place in stages:

1. Primary Treatment (completed in 1949): Sewage is held in sedimentation tanks where the sludge is removed and processed for use as fertilizer.
2. Secondary Treatment (completed in 1957): Primary effluent is pumped into oxidation ponds (here bacteria break down the waste).
3. Disinfection (completed in 1966): Secondary effluent is chlorinated to kill pathogens and dechlorinated to avoid damage to natural environments.
4. Tertiary Treatment (competed in 1986): Disinfected secondary effluent is put into artificial marshes where it is cleansed by reeds, cattails, and bacteria.
5. Disinfection: Tertiary effluent is chlorinated to kill pathogens from bird droppings and dechlorinated to avoid damage to natural environments.

== Treatment and enhancement ==
Sewage from the city of Arcata is treated and released to Humboldt Bay via complex flow routing through a number of contiguous ponds, wetlands, and marshes. Resemblance of treatment features to natural bay environments may cause potential ambiguity about where wastewater ceases to be considered partially treated sewage and meets enhancement objectives of the California Bays and Estuaries Policy. The wastewater treatment system includes both treatment wetlands and enhancement marshes. Treatment wetlands improve oxidation pond effluent quality to meet the federal definition of secondary treatment. Disinfection and dechlorination is the final step of the wastewater treatment process. Disinfected wastewater may be discharged either to Humboldt Bay or to enhancement marshes. Enhancement marshes purify the wastewater and provide wetland habitat. Enhancement marsh effluent is disinfected to improve coliform index changes from birds using tertiary treatment enhancement marsh habitat. After leaving the treatment wetlands the effluent is mixed with water returning from the enhancement marshes. Wild bird feces contain coliform bacteria similar to those found in human sewage. Recreational access is limited to areas where effluent has received secondary treatment and disinfection.

== Conventional pollutants or wetland detritus ==
Wetland plants use the energy of sunlight to produce five to ten times as much carbohydrate biomass per acre as a wheat field. Detritus from decomposing wetlands vegetation forms the base of a food chain for aquatic organisms, birds and mammals. Individuals who value wetland environments may not realize the effluent characteristics necessary for release of treated wastewater to Humboldt Bay. Although there is no evidence of harm to wildlife, some regulators suggest potential risk to wildlife using treatment wetlands because of an absence of significant research on wildlife exposure to partially treated effluent and to potential accumulation of chemicals being removed from effluent in wetland treatment processes. Ongoing research at Cal Poly Humboldt minimizes potential risk to Humboldt Bay wetlands and wildlife.

The City of Arcata generates an average volume of 2.3 million US gallons (8,700 m^{3}) of sewage per day. Winter rainfall onto treatment ponds and marshes increases the volume of effluent discharged from the wetland treatment system to as much as 16.5 million US gallons (62,000 m^{3}) per day. National Pollutant Discharge Elimination System regulations require monthly average effluent concentrations of biochemical oxygen demand and of total suspended solids to be no greater than 30 mg/L, with an additional requirement for removal of 85 percent of the quantities measured in untreated sewage from the City of Arcata. Unfortunately, when measuring concentrations leaving treatment wetlands, neither of these analytical methods can distinguish between unremoved conventional pollutants originally arriving in sewage, or detritus of decomposing wetland vegetation; so the limitations may apply to the sum of both.

== Wildlife ==
The Arcata Marsh and Wildlife Sanctuary encompasses 307 acres of land situated along the Pacific Flyway. Over 327 species of birds have been recorded at the sanctuary. Numerous plant, mammal, fish, insect, reptile and amphibian species inhabit the marsh. These include river otters, gray foxes, red-legged frog, tidewater goby, bobcat, striped skunk, praying mantis and red-sided garter snake.

== Arcata Marsh Interpretive Center ==
The Friends of the Arcata Marsh (FOAM) operate the Arcata Marsh Interpretive Center that contains exhibits about the operations of the treatment plant, the importance of the marsh, and about the plants and animals that live there. Volunteer docents give tours of the marsh. Education programs are offered for school, scout and other groups, as well as summer camp programs.
