= Minor Theater =

Theatre in Arcata, California, U.S.

Coordinates: 40°52′12″N 124°05′12″W

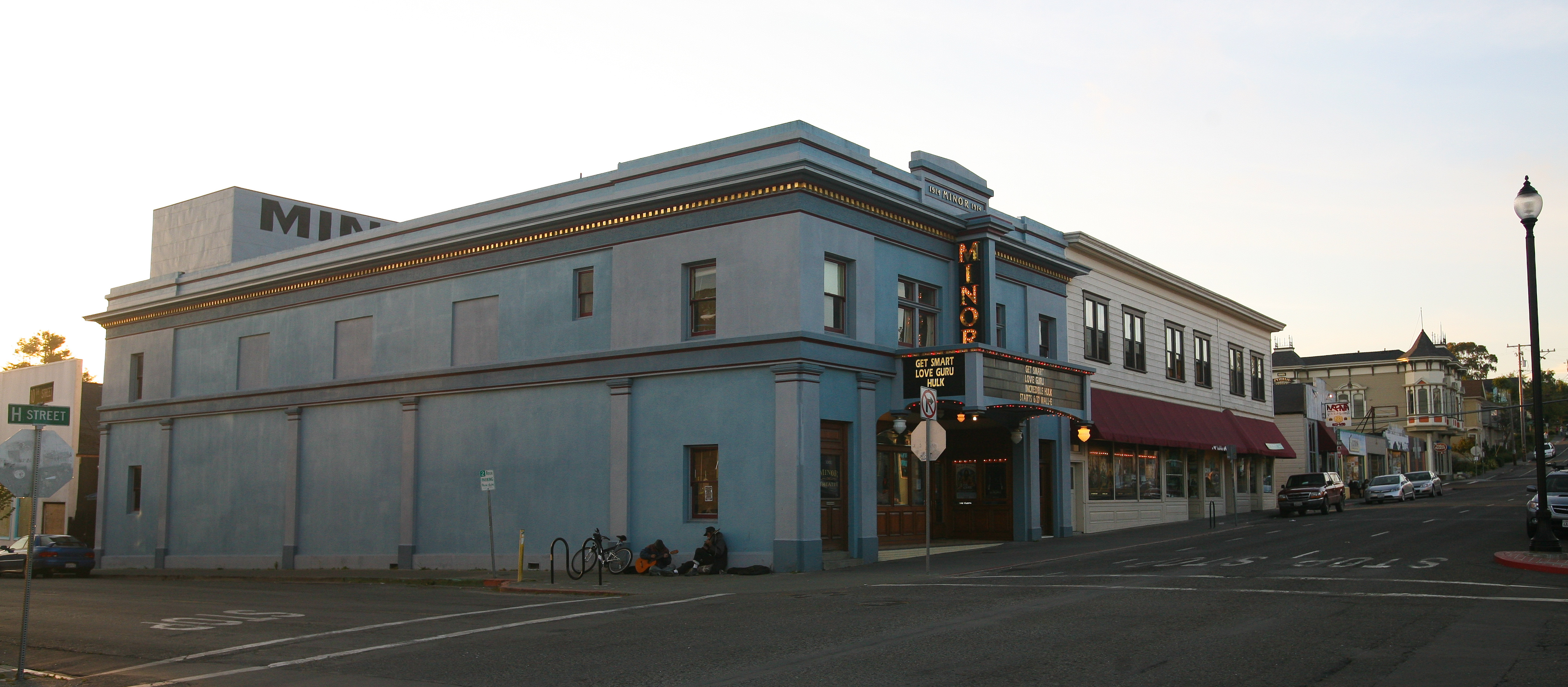
The Minor Theater, at dusk

The Minor Theater, located at 1001 H Street in Arcata, California, reopened under independent ownership in 2016. It is the second oldest movie theater in the United States to be built for that purpose. (The oldest movie theater in California is the Cameo Cinema in St Helena, Napa Valley.) It was the first building in Humboldt County to be built as a "true movie theater."

== History ==
The theater was built by Isaac Minor for a cost of $20,000. Ground was broken for the building of the theater on April 2, 1914, and the project was finished in November of that year, built in reinforced concrete for structural safety and fire-resistance. The grand opening was December 3, 1914. It closed in 1938 and reopened in the 50s. It closed again in the 60s due to the popularity of television and reopened again in 1972. It was closed again in 2016 and reopened a few months later. The trap door that Houdini used is still there.

The orchestra had room for twelve musicians. "The stage measured 25 to 43 feet and had an upward slope of three inches to the rear and was large enough to accommodate a large theatrical company or a chorus of at least 75 people."

It was purchased in 1971 from the Minor family by a group of Humboldt State University graduates, notable among them David Phillips, one of the founding students of the Humboldt Int'l Film Fest.

The Arcata City Council approved renovations in January, 1989.

The facility was leased by Coming Attractions Theatres in 2006. It is currently a triplex (two screens added from the adjacent commercial building) and seats 461.

The Minor Theater has housed the Humboldt Int'l Film Fest since 2017.

== See also ==
- Arcata Theatre
