= The Arcata Eye =

The Arcata Eye was a newspaper which describing itself as "the mildly objectionable weekly newspaper for Arcata, California." The paper was started, owned and edited by Kevin L. Hoover, a former founding member of Michigan band, The Sparklers. It covered news relevant to citizens of the City of Arcata and surrounding environs. Topics such as marijuana, homelessness, environmental issues, city council meetings, festivals, fundraisers and the local semi-pro baseball team, the Humboldt Crabs, are often found within its pages. The paper gained minor notoriety for the style of its articles and its police log. It was widely circulated in Arcata. It published its final print edition on September 25, 2013. The online edition continues.

== History ==
The Arcata Eye was born in 1996 after another local weekly newspaper, the Arcata Union (established 1886) went out of business. While the Union had shown some lag in profits, this was not the reason for its demise. It was terminated by the owner, Patrick O'Dell, in an effort to consolidate his Humboldt County newspaper holdings into the Humboldt Beacon, a paper run out of nearby Fortuna, California. Kevin L. Hoover was a reporter with the Union at the time of its termination and realized that a niche had opened.

Hoover scraped together enough funding and launched the Arcata Eye. The Eye, as it was often called by locals, was a very different paper from the Union. The logo depicted an eyeball and it had a unique and prominently placed police log – Hoover had previously run a "drier" police log while at the Union. Likely due to its "new thrust in journalism", and its close allegiance with Arcata's "more colorful side", the paper quickly gained in popularity and size. While the Arcata Eye had been the center of some controversy, it was generally considered the paper of record for Arcata.

== Police blotter ==
The Arcata Eye gained a reputation for its police logs and recurring themes about local street life. The police log gained a large following inside Arcata and in the broader area (thanks to online publication) because it took interesting tidbits in local police reports and couched them in "witty" language. Two books collecting together a selection of police logs have been published. The newspaper's owner, Kevin Hoover, popularized the term "plazoid" to describe those homeless people who congregate at the city's central square ("the Plaza"), on city streets, and in other city parks.
