= Arcata Theatre =

Building in Arcata, California, United States

Coordinates: 40.8703°N 124.08609°W

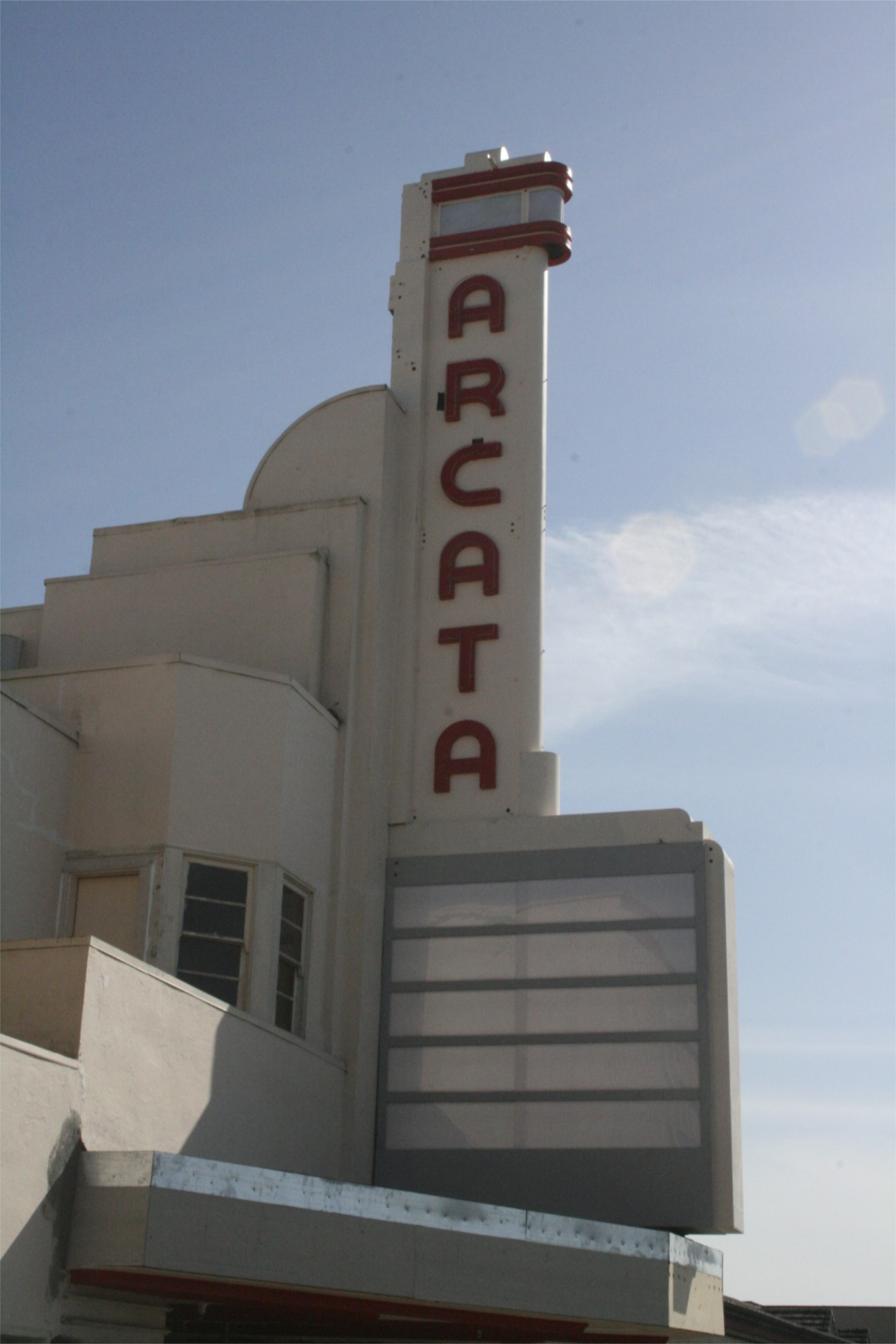
Arcata Theatre Lounge marquee

The Arcata Theatre Lounge is a historic structure located in the city of Arcata in Humboldt County, California.

== History ==
George Mann, who controlled the theater businesses in the area, commissioned architect William B. David to design the theater in 1927. Original construction costs ranged between $40,000 to $60,000. Opening night in 1938 featured Thin Ice, starring Sonja Henie and Tyrone Power. The theatre was a success and was soon offering up to six films a week along with added attractions, cartoons like Popeye and Betty Boop, news, and sports. In 1948 the theater was expanded an additional 30 feet to the east to allow for greater seating capacity. The length of the auditorium was increased by a third to accommodate a total of 900 seats. The original proscenium and screen were removed and replaced by a new, cinemascope screen that was larger. Acoustical plaster resurfaced the entire ceiling and a significant portion of the walls, thereby covering the Art Deco border designs and mural. New lighting fixtures, carpeting, seats with air cushions, as well as heating were installed to provide greater comfort.

In 1982 the theatre was sold to David Phillips but to operate as a movie house. The theater was sold in 2000 to Robert White. Lara and Brian Cox, bought the Arcata Theater in May 2004. All permanent theater-style seating was removed and replaced with platforms that allowed for mixed-used of the space, including comedy shows, concerts, and other entertainment in addition to the regular theater operations. A bar was installed at the back of the auditorium. It reopened as the Arcata Theatre Lounge in April 2009. In August 2016 it was again listed for sale for $1,850,000 and in August 2019 sold to Timothy Overturf for $1,135,000.

A number of businesses occupied the two small storefronts in the Arcata Theatre Building. What is now Smugs Pizza was first the Varsity Sweet Shop in 1938. In 1945 it became a watch repair business that was replaced by a jewelry store in 1948, the Clarke Employment Agency in 1954, and around 1979 became Our Gangs Ice Cream Shop. What is now Terry's Bluegrass Barbershop was in 1939 a beauty parlor. In 1945 it became a realtors office, then in 1955 a public accountant office. In 1963 Stan's Barbershop occupied the space. Terry's Bluegrass Barbershop continued to occupy the space as a barber until April 2020 when the COVID-19 outbreak forced the business to shut its doors permanently. After a brief dormancy, the space was reoccupied by a salon called "Directors Cut".

== Current operations ==
Since reopening as a mixed-use venue, the Arcata Theatre Lounge has become the focal point for entertainment in the small community of Arcata. Since 2010 the bar has had a full liquor license. Current occupancy guidelines allow up to 618 attendees depending on the configuration. Alongside movie showings, the venue has seen diverse music acts, including Riff Raff, Odesza, Troyboi, and GRiZ.

== Architecture ==
The chosen design was a combination of Art Deco and Art Moderne. Inside details were in the Art Deco style, including cumulus clouds painted on the ceiling and murals of swimming mermaids painted on the walls. Images of sea life covered many surfaces. “Best advertising for the town is George Mann’s new sign on the G Street Theater which emblazons to the world at large that south-bound tourists are now entering Arcata”. (Arcata Union, Jan. 28, 1938)

The auditorium of the theater was originally decorated in a simplified Art Deco tradition with geometric light fixtures, and a wondrous mural design of mermaids surfacing from the sea as legendary Selkies who had transformed themselves into voluptuous human form. The cumulus clouds and fanciful sea garden depicted life above and below the ocean. Geometric border designs edged the ceiling on two sides from front to back as well as around the back and center walls. The center wall featured a row of 10 circular windows where one could peek into the auditorium from the lobby. During the early 2000s eight circular windows that had been protected with paper and covered over with plaster during the 1948 remodel were uncovered.

In 2020 the rear wall of the theatre was covered by a mural depicting Diana the Huntress, a figure used frequently in Art Deco. Diana the Huntress is also etched into the historic circular windows in the theatre lobby.

== See also ==
- Minor Theater
