= Arcata, California =

City in the United States

- City
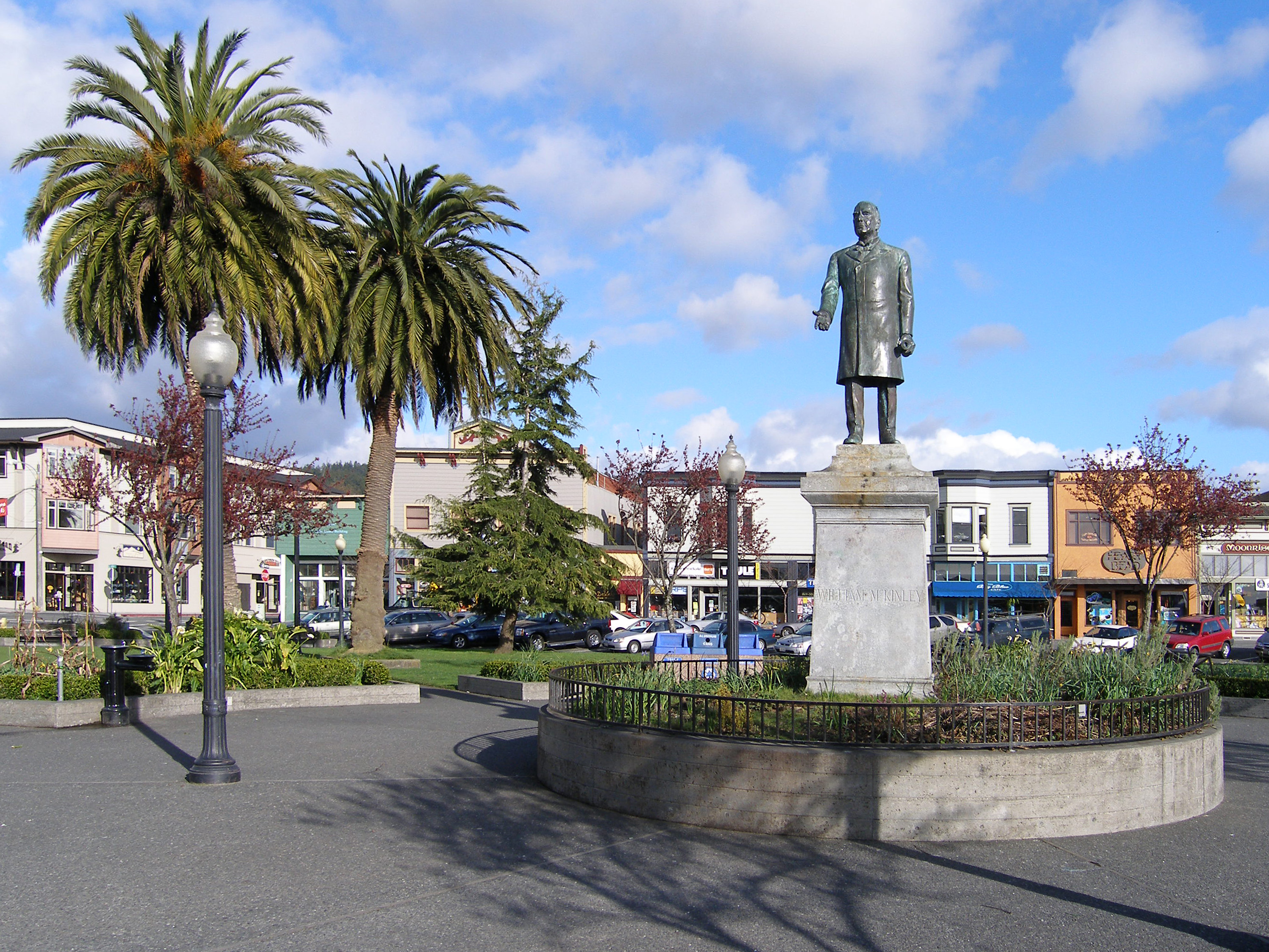
- Arcata Plaza

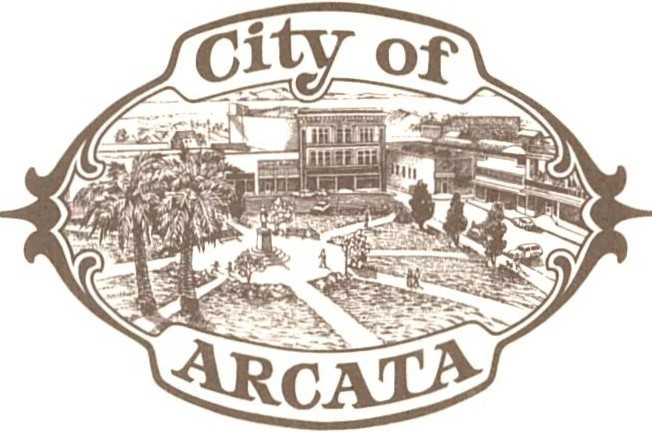
- Seal
- Interactive map of Arcata, California
- Location in California Location in the United States
- Coordinates: 40°52′5″N 124°5′26″W
- Country: United States
- State: California
- County: Humboldt
- Incorporated: February 2, 1858

Government
  - Type: Council-Manager
  - Mayor: Kimberley White
  - City manager: Merritt Perry

Area
  - Total: 11.44 sq mi (29.63 km^{2})
  - Land: 9.42 sq mi (24.40 km^{2})
  - Water: 2.02 sq mi (5.23 km^{2}) 17.25%
- Elevation: 23 ft (7.0 m)

Population (2020)
  - Total: 18,857
  - Density: 2,001.6/sq mi (772.83/km^{2})
- Time zone: UTC−8 (Pacific Time Zone)
  - Summer (DST): UTC−7 (PDT)
- ZIP codes: 95518, 95521
- Area code: 707, 369
- FIPS code: 06-02476
- GNIS feature IDs: 277471, 2409723
- Website: www.cityofarcata.org

Arcata (/ɑːrˈkeɪ.tə/; Wiyot: Goudi’ni; Yurok: Oket'oh) is a city adjacent to the Arcata Bay (northern) portion of Humboldt Bay in Humboldt County, California, United States. At the 2020 census, Arcata's population was 18,857. Arcata was first founded in 1850 as Union, was officially established in 1858, and was renamed Arcata in 1860. It is located 280 miles (450 km) north of San Francisco (via Highway 101), and is home to California State Polytechnic University, Humboldt. Arcata is also the location of the Arcata Field Office of the Federal Bureau of Land Management, which is responsible for the administration of natural resources, lands and mineral programs, including the Headwaters Forest, on approximately 200,000 acres (810 km^{2}) of public land in Northwestern California.

== History ==
=== Indigenous Native American ===
The Wiyot people and Yurok people inhabited this area prior to the arrival of Europeans and continue to live in the area. "Kori" is the name for the Wiyot settlement that existed on the site of what would become Arcata. The name "Arcata" comes from the Yurok term oket'oh, meaning "where there is a lagoon" (referring to Humboldt Bay), from o-, "place", plus ket'oh, "to be a lagoon". The same name was also used by the Yuroks for Big Lagoon. The natives of this region are the farthest-southwest people whose language has Algic roots, a language family shared with the Algonquian. The traditional homeland of the Wiyot ranged from the Little River in the north and continues south through Humboldt Bay (including the present cities of Eureka and Arcata) and then south to the lower Eel River basin. The traditional homeland of the Yurok ranges from Mad River to beyond the Klamath River in the north. Today, Arcata is the headquarters of the Big Lagoon Rancheria tribe, who maintain a 20-acre (81,000 m^{2}) reservation close by. Local Indian tribes operate several casinos in the area. In a coordinated 1860 massacre, significant numbers of Wiyot people were killed by white settlers at several locations in and around Humboldt Bay, including the center of their society, the island known to them as Duluwat Island. A local newspaper editor, who would later be known as Bret Harte, was forced to leave the Humboldt Bay area after he editorialized his disgust with the incident.

=== Westernization ===
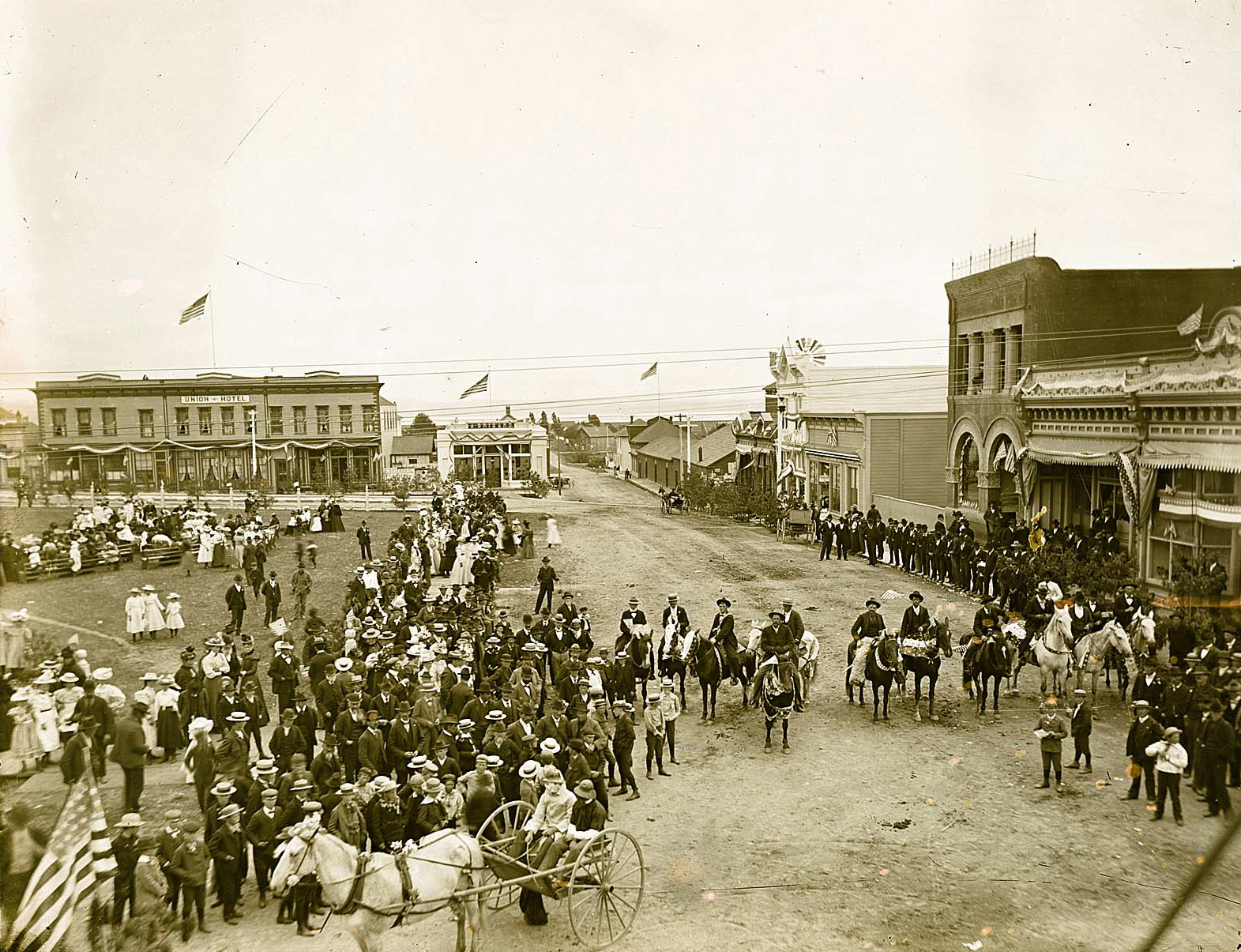
Arcata Plaza in the 1890s

The Spaniards claimed the area but never settled it; the first permanent settlements occurred after California was admitted to the Union. Arcata was first settled as Union in 1850. Union was created as a port, and reprovisioning center for the gold mines in the Klamath, Trinity, and Salmon mountains to the east, and was very briefly the county seat during this period. It was slightly closer to the mines than Eureka, which gave Union an early advantage. What was to become the first significant town on Humboldt Bay began as Union Company employees laid out the plaza and first city streets in the Spring of 1850. By later in the 1850s redwood timber replaced the depleted gold fields as the economic driver for the region and Eureka became the principal city on the bay due to its possession of the better harbor, gaining it the county seat by the end of the decade.

The Union town post office opened in 1852, and the town changed its name to Arcata in 1860.

In 1886, concern over the growing number of unassimilated immigrants led Arcata to expel its Chinese population and enact the following resolution: "We, the citizens of Arcata and vicinity, wish the total expulsion of the Chinese from our midst. We endorse the efforts of Eureka to exclude all Chinese settlements in the city and environs."

History and images of early settler families in Arcata are cataloged in the Susie Baker Fountain Papers and True Hoyle Collection at California State Polytechnic University, Humboldt. These collections also include images of important social events in the Arcata area, such as graduations at Arcata High School as early as 1910, as well as images of social gatherings at the Arcata plaza before the statue of William McKinley was erected in the center from 1906 until its relocation in 2019.

=== Recent history ===
Since the 1970s, Arcata has been home to multiple major manufacturing companies, specifically in the outdoor industry. Yakima Racks, a major car racks and bike accessories company, was headquartered in Arcata from 1979 to 2005, when the company moved to Oregon. Moonstone Mountaineering, founded out of a van at Moonstone Beach in 1977, was a major innovator in down sleeping bags, waterproof gear, and fleece before being bought and closed by Columbia Sportswear in 2006. Kokatat, founded as Blue Puma in 1971 and renamed in 1986, is a major watersports clothing company headquartered in Arcata that specializes in waterproof apparel for kayaking, and outfits the US Coast Guard, Navy SEALs, and SWCC, US watersports teams for 1992 and 1996 Summer Olympics and the movie The Bodyguard. Wing Inflatables, founded in Arcata in 1991, manufactures polyurethane Inflatables boats used by riverboat tours, as well Navy SEALs, Coast Guard, NOAA, and NASA.

In August 1989, the voters of Arcata passed the Nuclear Weapons Free Zone Act, prohibiting work on nuclear weapons, and the storage or transportation of nuclear weapons within the city limits. The ordinance also minimized the city's contracts for and purchases of the products and services of nuclear weapons contractors. On March 17, 2010, the Arcata city council voted for final passage of an unlawful-panhandling ordinance (Ordinance No. 1399). Among other restrictions, it forbids panhandling within 20 feet (6 m) of any business.

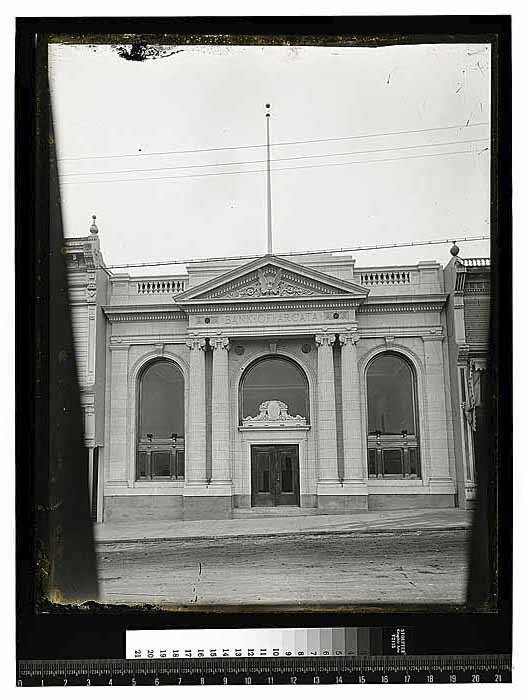
Bank of Arcata on the Plaza

== Geography ==
According to the United States Census Bureau, the city has a total area of 11.0 square miles (28.5 km^{2}), of which 9.1 square miles (23.6 km^{2}) is land and 1.9 square miles (4.9 km^{2}), comprising 17.25%, is water.

Arcata contains major public and shopping areas within the city. They include: the Downtown/Plaza Area, Northtown, and Valley West (each of these are also large neighborhoods). There are additional named neighborhoods encompassed by the city: They include: Aldergrove, Alliance (which was once a separate community located North of Arcata), Arcata Bottoms, portions of Bayside (despite it having its own Post Office and postal code), Bayview, California Heights, the Creamery District, Fickle Hill (lower portions), Greenview, the Marsh District (aka South G Street), Redwood Park (which includes the City-owned Redwood forest), Sunny Brae, Sunset, and Westwood. Arcata also has the Arcata Marsh, a preserve located on the city's bay shore.

=== Climate ===
Arcata has a cool-summer Mediterranean climate (Köppen: Csb), which is dominated by marine influences associated with Humboldt Bay and the Pacific Ocean. These influences make the climate in the city much cooler than that of a typical Mediterranean climate and more on par with that of an oceanic climate. On average, Arcata experiences 40 to 50 inches (1,000 to 1,300 mm) of rain per year, though there is a short but pronounced dry season from June to September. Northerly winds keep the spring very cool and create a coastal upwelling of deep, cold, ocean water. This upwelling in turn results in foggy conditions throughout the summer, with high temperatures commonly in the 50s and low 60s. Yet just a few miles inland the temperatures may be up to 25 °F (14 °C) degrees warmer in the summer and fall. This is even more pronounced further inland in the Trinity River valley.

Winter high temperatures average in the low 40s to mid-50s, with lows in the mid-30s to lower 40s. Temperatures infrequently dip below 30 °F (−1 °C) in the winter, and nearly as infrequently climb above 72 °F (22 °C) in the summer and fall.

Arcata has higher record temperatures than county seat Eureka, although averages are very similar.

Climate data for Arcata, California
Month	Jan	Feb	Mar	Apr	May	Jun	Jul	Aug	Sep	Oct	Nov	Dec	Year
Record high °F (°C)	69 (21)	76 (24)	78 (26)	87 (31)	95 (35)	95 (35)	96 (36)	96 (36)	96 (36)	93 (34)	77 (25)	67 (19)	96 (36)
Mean daily maximum °F (°C)	56.4 (13.6)	56.6 (13.7)	56.7 (13.7)	57.7 (14.3)	59.7 (15.4)	62.5 (16.9)	63.4 (17.4)	64.5 (18.1)	65.1 (18.4)	63.5 (17.5)	58.9 (14.9)	56.2 (13.4)	60.1 (15.6)
Mean daily minimum °F (°C)	40.5 (4.7)	40.6 (4.8)	41.4 (5.2)	42.8 (6.0)	46.0 (7.8)	48.5 (9.2)	51.3 (10.7)	51.3 (10.7)	48.5 (9.2)	45.0 (7.2)	42.1 (5.6)	39.7 (4.3)	44.8 (7.1)
Record low °F (°C)	24 (−4)	27 (−3)	30 (−1)	33 (1)	35 (2)	38 (3)	44 (7)	47 (8)	42 (6)	33 (1)	28 (−2)	20 (−7)	20 (−7)
Average precipitation inches (mm)	7.52 (191)	6.48 (165)	6.28 (160)	4.11 (104)	2.10 (53)	0.96 (24)	0.19 (4.8)	0.26 (6.6)	0.85 (22)	2.71 (69)	5.71 (145)	8.95 (227)	46.12 (1,171)
Average snowfall inches (cm)	0 (0)	0.1 (0.25)	0 (0)	0 (0)	0 (0)	0 (0)	0 (0)	0 (0)	0 (0)	0 (0)	0 (0)	0.1 (0.25)	0.2 (0.51)
Average precipitation days (≥ 0.01 in)	16.7	15.0	16.1	13.3	9.3	5.5	2.5	2.8	4.2	8.3	14.9	17.1	125.7
Source: NOAA

== Demographics ==
Historical population
Census	Pop.	Note	%±
1880	702		—
1890	962		37.0%
1900	952		−1.0%
1910	1,121		17.8%
1920	1,486		32.6%
1930	1,709		15.0%
1940	1,855		8.5%
1950	3,729		101.0%
1960	5,235		40.4%
1970	8,985		71.6%
1980	12,850		43.0%
1990	15,197		18.3%
2000	16,651		9.6%
2010	17,231		3.5%
2020	18,857		9.4%
2024 (est.)	18,748	▼	−0.6%
U.S. Decennial Census

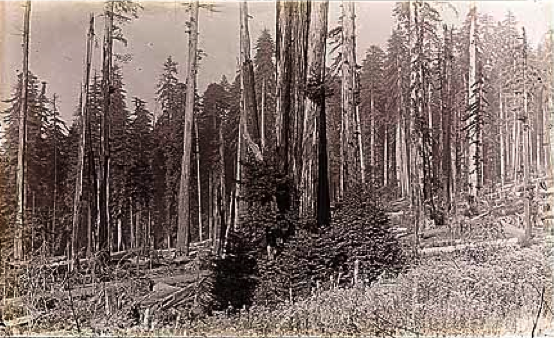
Industry in Humboldt County

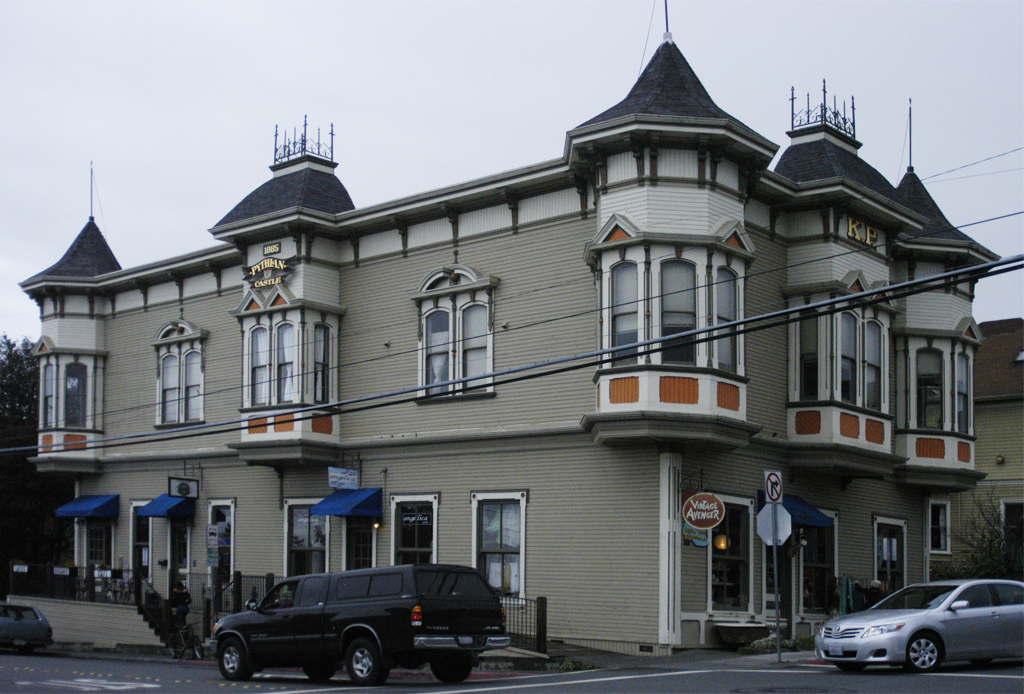
The Pythian Castle building in Arcata is on the National Register of Historic Places.

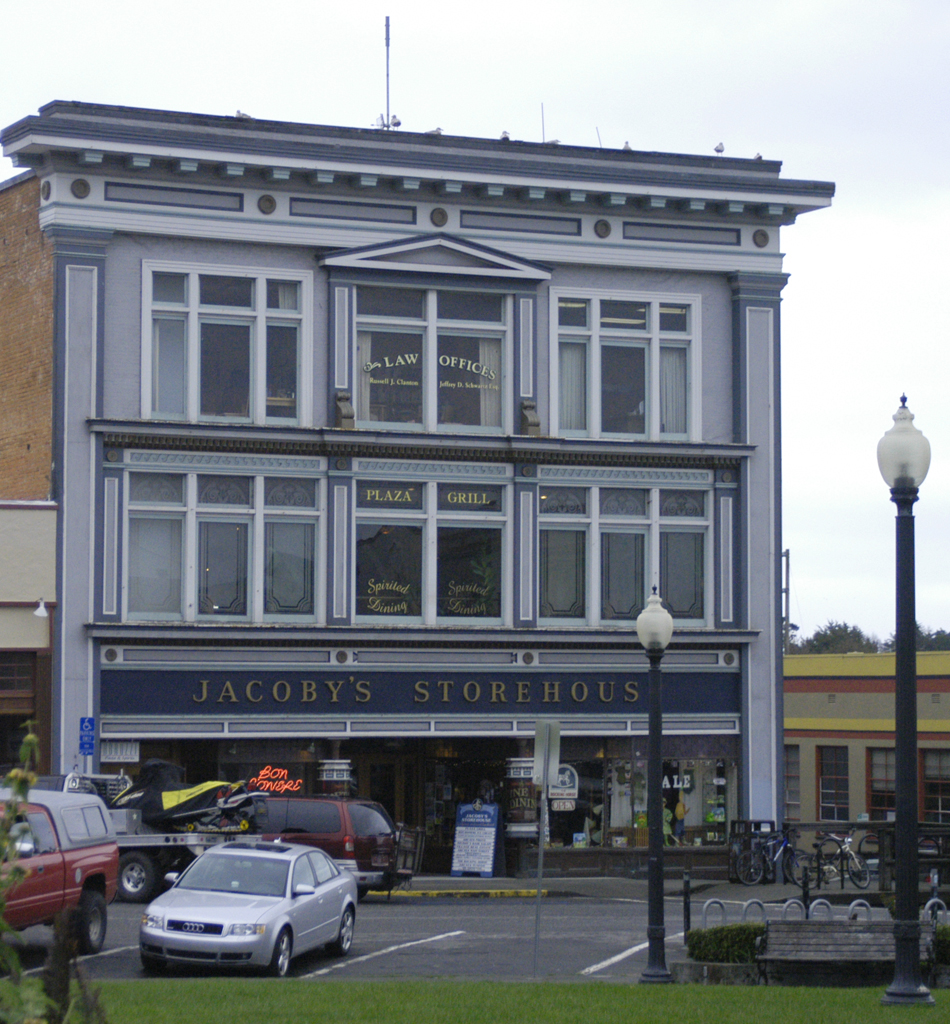
The Jacoby Building, commonly known as Jacoby's Storehouse, on the Plaza in Arcata, is one of Humboldt County's oldest commercial buildings (the first floor dates from 1857), and is also on the National Register of Historic Places.

=== Racial and ethnic composition ===
Race and Ethnicity
Racial and ethnic composition	2000	2010	2020
White (non-Hispanic)	81.3%	76.33%	64.41%
Hispanic or Latino (of any race)	7.22%	11.61%	19.83%
Two or more races (non-Hispanic)	4.25%	4.99%	7.49%
Black or African American (non-Hispanic)	1.48%	1.87%	2.54%
Asian (non-Hispanic)	2.23%	2.52%	2.44%
Native American (non-Hispanic)	2.31%	1.87%	2.08%
Other (non-Hispanic)	1.03%	0.62%	0.97%
Pacific Islander (non-Hispanic)	0.18%	0.18%	0.24%

=== Logging bust ===
Changing populations have happened in timber and mining towns in the American West as a result of boom and bust economic cycles. Some towns decrease in population following a bust, while some, like Arcata, experience a change in demographics. In the case of Arcata, the peak and the bust were close due to Arcata's relatively late entry into the timber industry, and its domination by mechanization. The population of the city of Arcata was 3,729 during its peak 1950, when lumber was exported throughout the country and abroad. For the County of Humboldt, the age distribution for urban residents, which would include Arcata, had 23.7% of the population under the age of 15. Those that would be considered young workers (age 15–24) made up 14% of the population. "Normal" aged workers (age 25–39) made up 23.9% of the population. Older working age (age 40–54) made up 19.4% of the population. Pre-retirement aged (age 55–64) made up 9.7% of the population. Those of retirement age (age 65 and older) made up 9.1% of the population. For Arcata specifically, those age 65 and older were 8.3% of the population in 1950, and the median age was 29.4 years.

After the bust in 1955, the population of Arcata in 1960 was 5,235. In Arcata the population under the age of 15 was 28.1%. Those age 15–24 made up 22.8% of Arcata's population. Those age 25–39 made up 19.4% of the population. Those age 40–54 made up 16% of Arcata's population. Those age 55–64 made up 6.7% of Arcata's population. Those age 65 and over made up 6.9% of Arcata's population.

Overall, census data reflects a lowering in the age of the Arcata population, due to an influx of young workers, due to there not being enough time after the bust for older workers to leave, in the decade between 1950 and 1960, during which the timber industry peaked and busted.

=== 2020 census ===
As of the 2020 census, Arcata had a population of 18,857. The median age was 28.5 years. 13.3% of residents were under the age of 18 and 11.7% of residents were 65 years of age or older. For every 100 females there were 95.9 males, and for every 100 females age 18 and over there were 94.5 males age 18 and over.

99.6% of residents lived in urban areas, while 0.4% lived in rural areas.

There were 7,850 households in Arcata, of which 19.5% had children under the age of 18 living in them. Of all households, 21.9% were married-couple households, 30.0% were households with a male householder and no spouse or partner present, and 34.5% were households with a female householder and no spouse or partner present. About 37.7% of all households were made up of individuals and 10.3% had someone living alone who was 65 years of age or older.

There were 8,423 housing units, of which 6.8% were vacant. The homeowner vacancy rate was 0.6% and the rental vacancy rate was 5.0%.

Racial composition as of the 2020 census
Race	Number	Percent
White	13,226	70.1%
Black or African American	523	2.8%
American Indian and Alaska Native	558	3.0%
Asian	501	2.7%
Native Hawaiian and Other Pacific Islander	46	0.2%
Some other race	1,637	8.7%
Two or more races	2,366	12.5%
Hispanic or Latino (of any race)	3,739	19.8%

=== 2010 census ===
The 2010 United States census reported that Arcata had a population of 17,231. The population density was 1,567.4 inhabitants per square mile (605.2/km^{2}).

The racial makeup of Arcata was:

- 14,094 (81.8%) White,
- 2,000+ (11.6%) Hispanic or Latino,
- 1,135 (6.6%) from two or more races,
- 769 (4.5%) from other races,
- 454 (2.6%) Asian,
- 393 (2.3%) Native American,
- 351 (2.0%) African American, and
- 35 (0.2%) Pacific Islander,

The Census reported that 15,486 people (89.9% of the population) lived in households, 1,745 (10.1%) lived in non-institutionalized group quarters, and 0 were institutionalized.

There were 7,381 households, out of which 1,275 (17.3%) had children under the age of 18 living in them, 1,651 (22.4%) were opposite-sex married couples living together, 649 (8.8%) had a female householder with no husband present, 325 (4.4%) had a male householder with no wife present. There were 764 (10.4%) unmarried opposite-sex partnerships, and 75 (1.0%) same-sex married couples or partnerships. 2,730 households (37.0%) were made up of individuals, and 524 (7.1%) had someone living alone who was 65 years of age or older. The average household size was 2.10. There were 2,625 families (35.6% of all households); the average family size was 2.73.

The population dispersal was with 2,164 people (12.6%) under the age of 18, 5,891 people (34.2%) aged 18 to 24, 4,619 people (26.8%) aged 25 to 44, 3,149 people (18.3%) aged 45 to 64, and 1,408 people (8.2%) who were 65 years of age or older. The median age was 26.1 years. For every 100 females, there were 99.2 males. For every 100 females age 18 and over, there were 98.0 males.

There were 7,722 housing units at an average density of 702.4 units per square mile (271.2 units/km^{2}), of which 7,381 were occupied, of which 2,519 (34.1%) were owner-occupied, and 4,862 (65.9%) were occupied by renters. The homeowner vacancy rate was 1.2%; the rental vacancy rate was 2.2%. 5,496 people (31.9% of the population) lived in owner-occupied housing units and 9,990 people (58.0%) lived in rental housing units.

=== 2000 census ===
As of the census of 2000, there were 16,651 people, 7,051 households, and 2,813 families residing in the city. The population density was 1,812.1 inhabitants per square mile (699.7/km^{2}). There were 7,272 housing units at an average density of 791.4 units per square mile (305.6 units/km^{2}). The racial makeup of the city in 2010 is 76.3% non-Hispanic White, 1.9% non-Hispanic Black or African American, 1.9% Native American, 2.5% Asian, 0.2% Pacific Islander, 0.6% from other races, and 5.0% from two or more races. 11.6% of the population were Hispanic or Latino of any race.

The composition of Arcata's households reflects the large number of unrelated college-age students living together. Of the 7,051 households in Arcata, only 19.7% had children under the age of 18 living with them, only 25.9% were married couples living together, 10.4% had a female householder with no husband present, while 60.1% were non-families. 34.8% of all households were made up of individuals, and 7.1% had someone living alone who was 65 years of age or older. The average household size was 2.16 and the average family size was 2.81.

Arcata's age cohorts are also distorted by a large percentage of college-age students. Only 15.3% of Arcata residents are under the age of 18, while nearly a third (32.3%) fall between ages 18 and 24, and 27.8% are 25 to 44 years old. Among older age cohorts, 15.9% are 45 to 64 years old, and 8.7% were 65 years of age or older. The median age was 26 years. For every 100 females, there were 99.0 males. For every 100 females age 18 and over, there were 96.9 males.

As of 2002, there were 8,210 employed persons living in Arcata and an unemployment rate of 7.2%. For many years the timber industry dominated Arcata's economy. Today, the majority of Arcata jobs come from government (including schools and Cal Poly Humboldt), the city's many owner-resident small businesses, some lumber and food manufacturing, and a wide variety of service industries (ranging from professional services to restaurant and hospitality). A large but unmeasurable cannabis economy employs many in Arcata and the surrounding area. The area's economy and population are both growing more slowly than the State of California overall.

Median reported household income in Arcata was $22,315, and the median income for a family was $36,716. Males had a median income of $26,577 versus $24,358 for females. The per capita income for the city was $15,531, however this figure may be artificially low due to the large student population. About 14.3% of families and 32.2% of the population were below the poverty line, including 22.4% of those under age 18 and 6.0% of those age 65 or over.

== Arts and culture ==
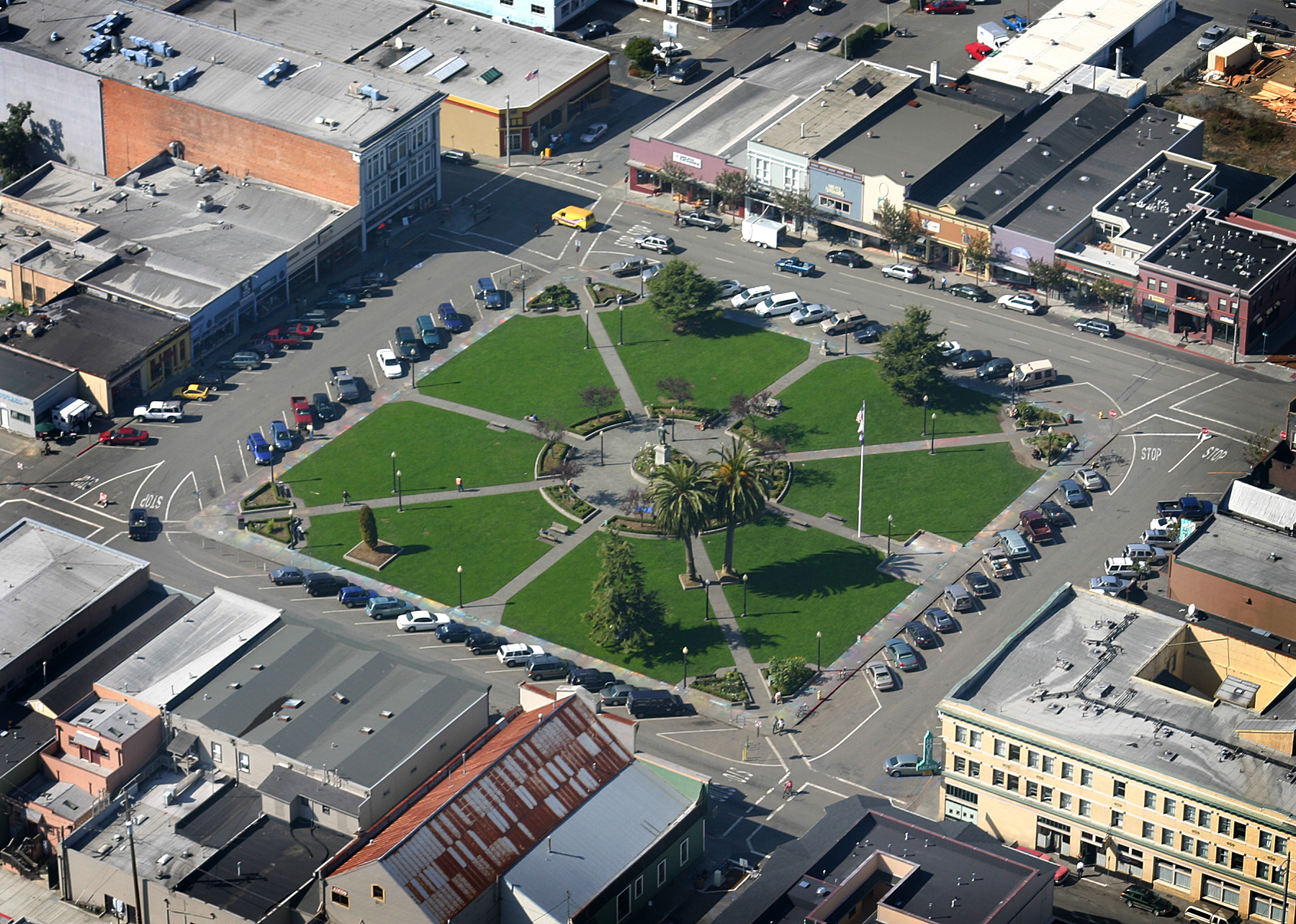
Arcata Plaza

The heart of Arcata is the Plaza. In the 1850s, the Plaza was where goods destined for the Trinity County mines were loaded onto mule trains. The Plaza has a green lawn, extensive flower plantings, and at its center there used to be a statue of president William McKinley by Haig Patigian. The Plaza is surrounded by bookstores, bars, coffee shops, restaurants, and live music venues. The Plaza is also the center of Humboldt County's largest farmers' market, and serves as a major venue for local Fourth of July festivities, the Arcata Main Street Oyster Festival, the start of the Kinetic Sculpture Race, and the North Country Fair. The North Country Fair Samba Parade has been a community favorite since 1986. The Plaza is also a popular rendezvous point for travelers who stop off in Arcata.

The annual Explorations in Afro-Cuban Dance and Drum workshop is held every summer on the Cal Poly Humboldt campus. The workshop hosts the largest assemblage of Afro-Cuban folkloric music and dance masters in the United States.

The statue of William McKinley has been a point of controversy since the 1970s. Opponents of the statue condemned McKinley's supposed support of settler colonialism and policies that led to the slaughter of Native Americans. Supporters of the statue emphasized its historical significance as a major part of the culture of Arcata. In February 2018, the Arcata City Council voted to remove the statue from the Plaza, a decision supported in November 2018 when a referendum to block the statue's removal was defeated. In February 2019, the Arcata City Council approved a measure to relocate the statue to the William McKinley Presidential Library and Museum in Canton, Ohio, and on February 28, the statue was removed from the Plaza in preparation for its relocation.

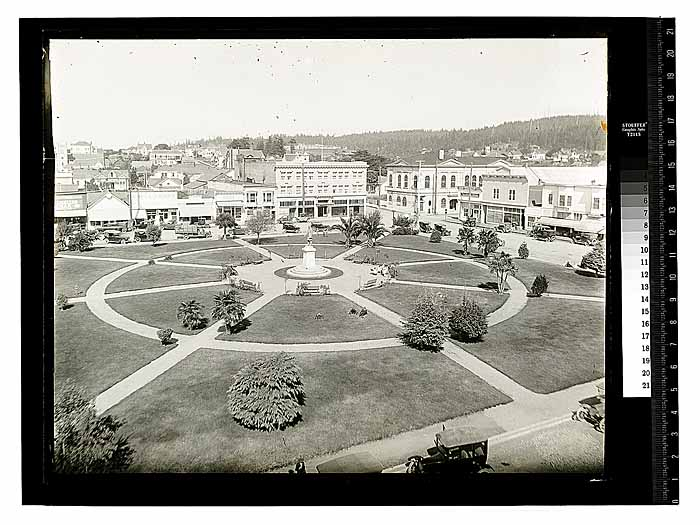
Arcata Plaza looking northeast from top of Brizard Building

Arcata also features a large number of original Victorian structures, many of which have been restored.

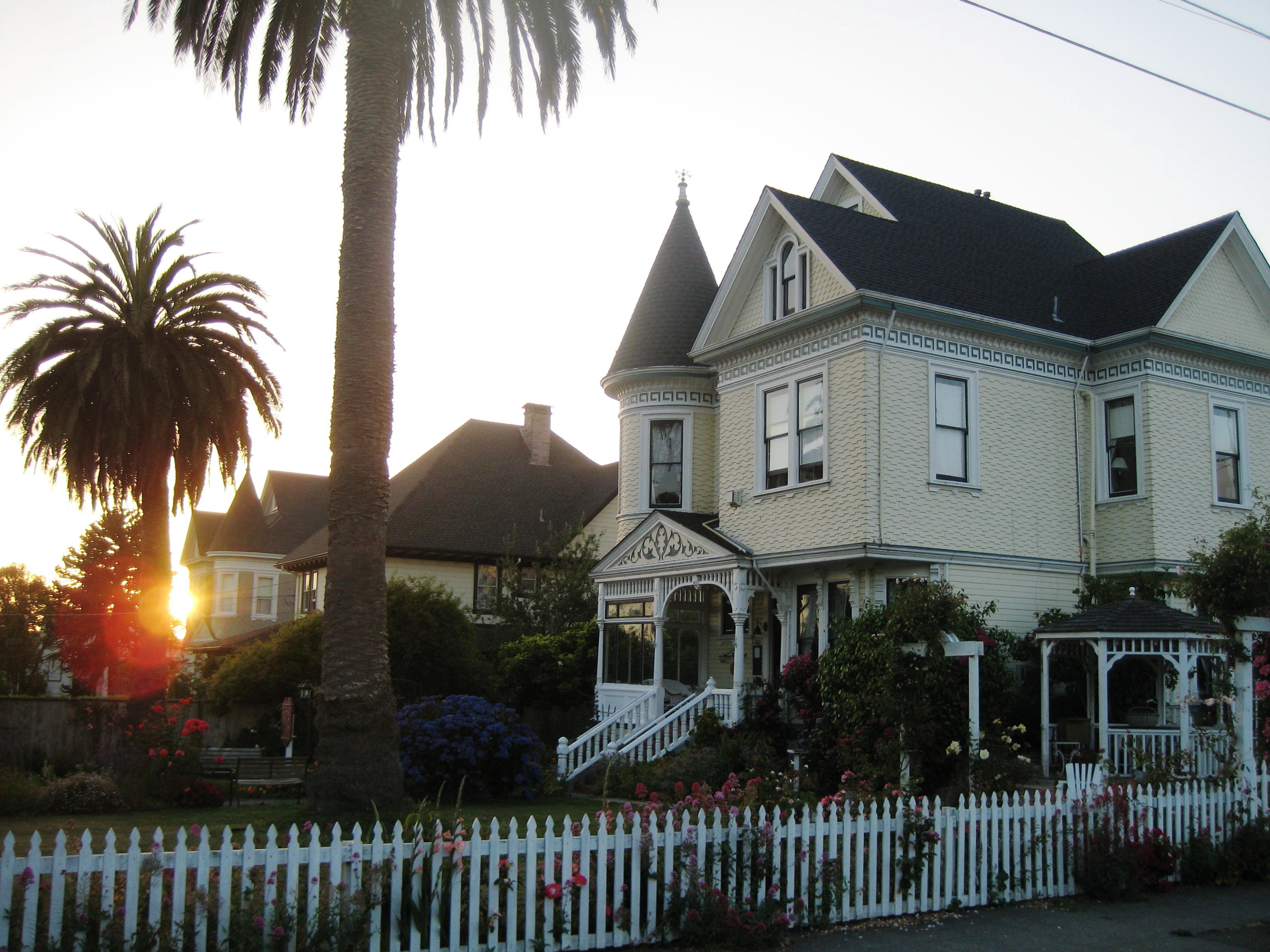
Victorian architecture in Arcata

The Wiyot people, the original inhabitants of the area, call the Plaza "Goad-la-nah" for the "land a little above the water".

Arcata's Minor Theater is one of the oldest movies-only theaters in the United States which is still in operation. It is also home to the Arcata Theatre.

=== Events ===
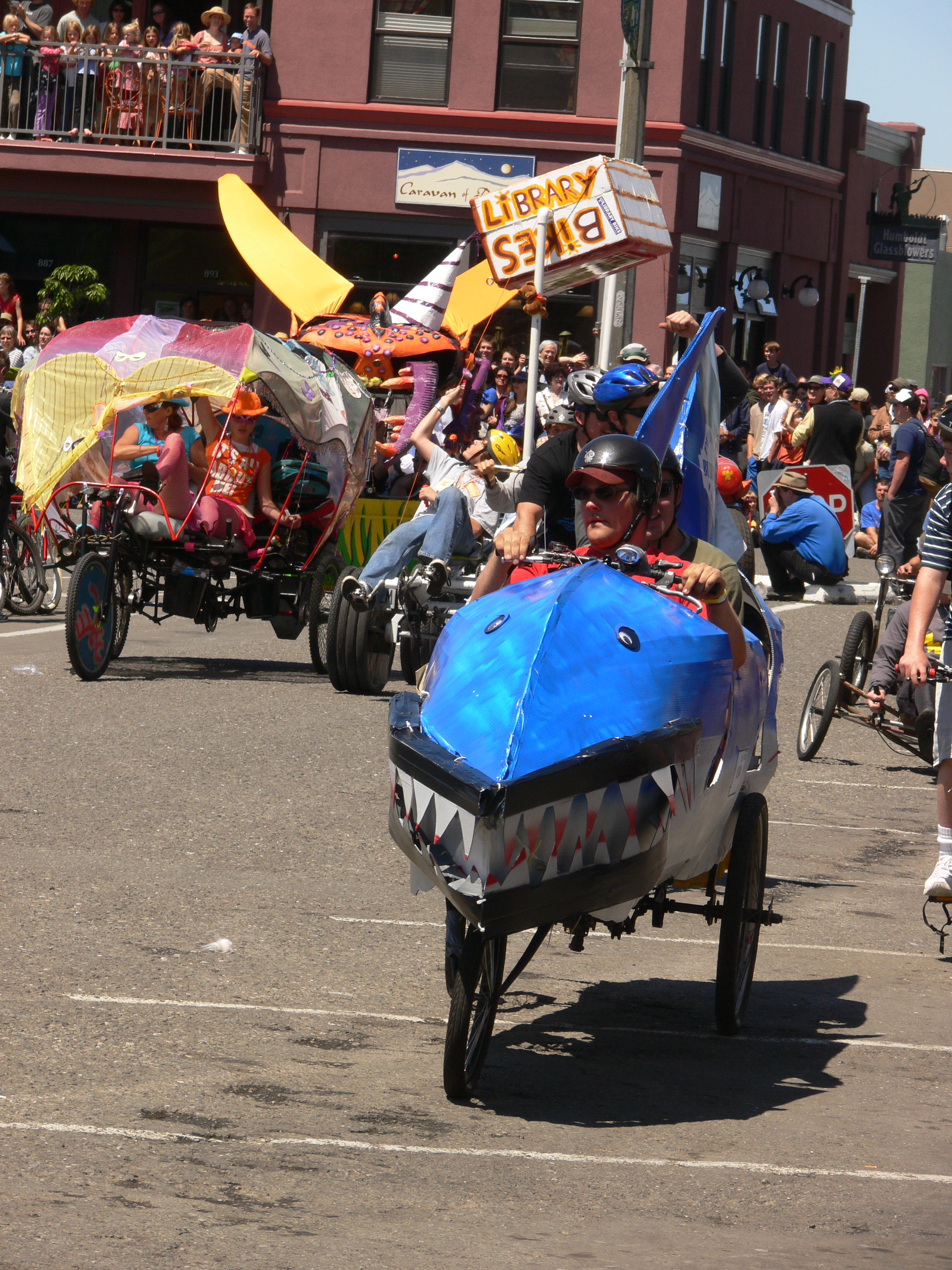
Arcata's Plaza is the starting point for the Kinetic Sculpture Race.

- Kinetic Sculpture Race
- North Country Fair
- North Country Fair Samba Parade
- Godwit Days (Spring Migration Bird Festival, 3rd week in April annually)
- Arts! Arcata every second Friday from 6 p.m. to 9 p.m.
- Arcata Main Street Oyster Festival
- Fourth of July Jubilee
- Saturday's Farmer's Market
- 12 Hours of Humboldt, mountain bike endurance race, August
- "I" Street Block Party, in the summer to benefit Arcata's sister city
- Pastels on the Plaza

== Sports ==
Arcata is home to the Humboldt Crabs, the nation's longest continuously operated semi-pro baseball team, which has played every season since 1945 except for the 2020 season, which was cancelled due to COVID-19 quarantine measures.

== Parks and recreation ==
The Arcata Marsh, a constructed network of freshwater and saltwater ponds initially completed in 1979, demonstrates a revolutionary marsh-based wastewater treatment system. The marsh was built on a retired municipal solid waste dump and has received many awards, including the Innovations in Government award from the Ford Foundation and Harvard Kennedy School. The marsh is a popular destination for cyclists, bird watchers, transients, and joggers, and was recently expanded as a part of the McDaniel Slough restoration project.

The City owns a total of 2,100 acres (8.5 km^{2}) of forest land, including the Arcata Community Forest, the Sunny Brae Forest, and the Jacoby Creek Forest. Arcata's community forest lands have been the subject of national media attention. The Arcata Community Forest was originally acquired by the City in order to protect the integrity of its municipal water supply. Upon acquisition in 1955, The Arcata Community Forest was dedicated as the first city-owned community forest in the State of California. Since then it has served many functions including recreation, education, sustainable timber harvesting, and wildlife habitat. The forest serves as the headwaters of many of Arcata's urban streams. In 1979, the citizens of Arcata passed the "Forest Management and Parkland Initiative." The intent of the legislation was to develop a responsible and ecologically sensitive long-term forest management program, which would provide timber-harvest revenues for the acquisition and development of City parkland. In 1998 the Arcata Community Forest was the first municipal forest certified in the U.S. under the Forest Stewardship Council (FSC). Since that time additional acreage has been protected, such as the 175-acre (0.71 km^{2}) Sunny Brae Forest acquisition in 2006, and the 2009 receipt of a donated 185-acre (0.75 km^{2}) conservation easement adjacent to the Arcata Community Forest's northern boundary in the upper Janes Creek watershed.

== Government ==
The city of Arcata has a Council-Manager form of government, with a City Council of five members, which is the legislative policy-making branch of city government. Each Council member is elected at large (i.e., by all voting Arcata residents) for a four-year term. Members are allowed to run for re-election, and there is no limit on how many terms a person may serve. The Council directs the course of local government through its power to adopt ordinances, levy taxes, award contracts, and appoint certain city officers, commissions and committees.

Arcata has been notably progressive in its political makeup, and was the first city in the United States to elect a majority of its city council members from the Green Party. As a result of the progressive majority, Arcata capped the number of chain restaurants allowed in the city. Arcata was also the first municipality to ban the growth of any type of Genetically Modified Organism within city limits, with exceptions for research and educational purposes.

=== Politics ===
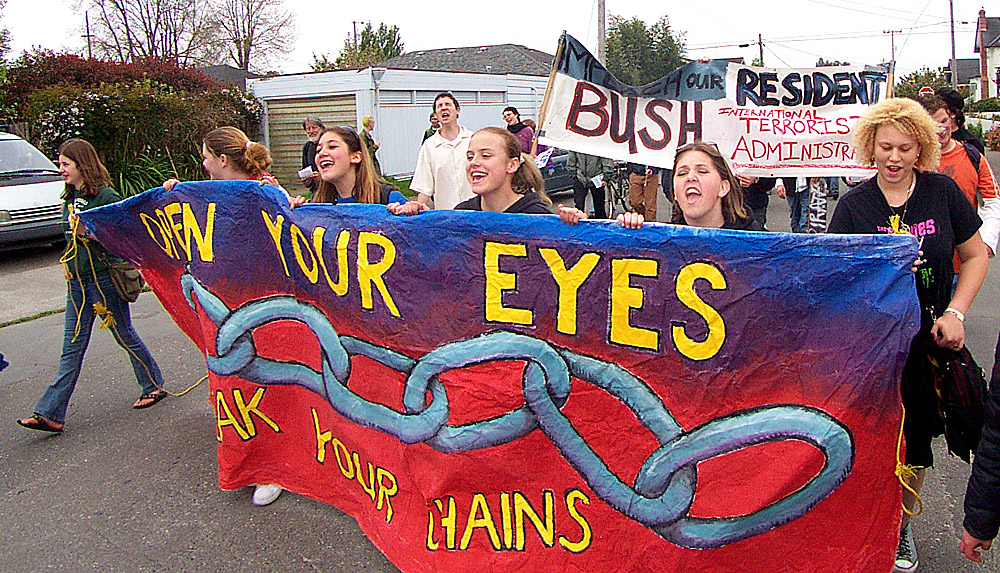
Protest against the George W. Bush administration

In the state legislature, Arcata is in the 2nd senatorial district, represented by Democrat Mike McGuire, and the 2nd Assembly district, represented by Democrat Chris Rogers.

Federally, Arcata is in California's 2nd congressional district, represented by Democrat Jared Huffman.

Arcata voters are among the most Democratic in Humboldt County. In the 2008 United States presidential election, Republican candidate John McCain received less than 10% of the popular vote in many Arcata precincts, while in those same precincts Democratic candidate Barack Obama received 85% or more of the vote. Arcata is a hub of liberal thought typical of a college town, a place where environmentalism and social activism are broadly embraced. Humboldt County fits the statewide trend of increasingly liberal coastal counties and conservative interior counties, but some conservative voters remain. College students have, at times, been mayor or city council members.

Arcata was the first city to have a Green Party majority in its city council. Arcata is also one of three cities in California and one of four cities in the United States ever to have held a Green Party majority in their city councils.

In August 1989, the voters of Arcata passed the Nuclear Weapons Free Zone Act, prohibiting activities benefiting nuclear weapons contractors within city jurisdictional limits.

Arcata residents are active in regional environmental protection, and played a contributing role in the successful effort to preserve the Headwaters Forest from logging. The north coast region is often divided on environmental issues, with conflicts arising between residents and landowners who have made a living harvesting the area's natural resources, and residents aiming to preserve the region's natural habitats.

Arcata is on the path to decriminalizing most psychedelic entheogenic substances.

In November 2022, the voters of Arcata passed a Measure M, which would have compelled the city to fly an Earth Flag above that of the United States, but this was ruled unlawful by the Humboldt County Superior Court in April of 2024.

== Education ==
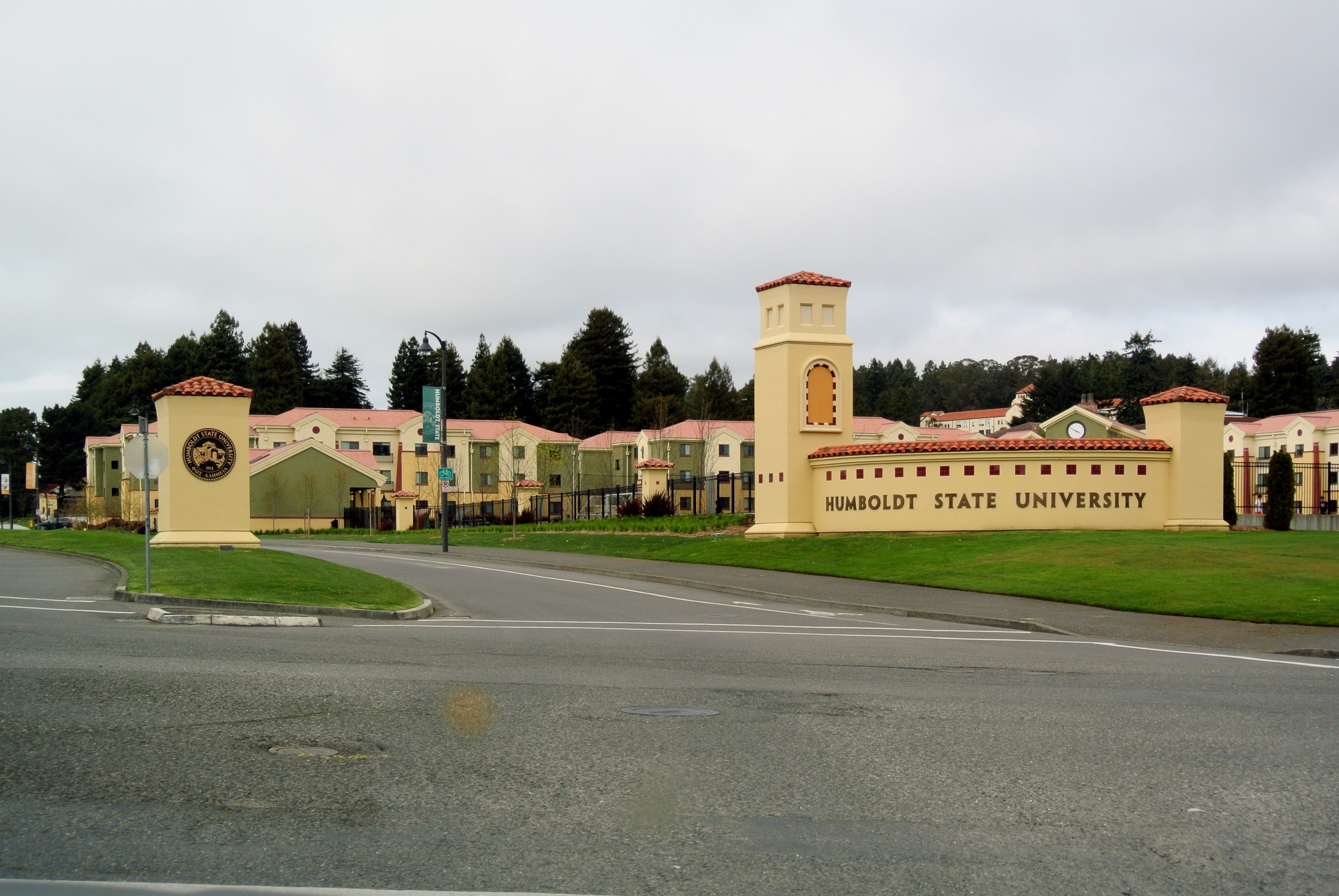
Entrance of California State Polytechnic University, Humboldt

Arcata is the site of California State Polytechnic University, Humboldt, the northernmost campus of the 23-campus California State University system. With a student body equaling nearly half the city's total population, Arcata is a classic example of a traditional "college town." The city center is 0.8 mi (1.3 km) from the university center and takes about 16 minutes to walk.

The primary public high school is Arcata High School, with a total population of 827 for the 2012–2013 school year. The high school is located at 1720 M Street in Arcata, and is part of the Northern Humboldt Union High School District. The school offers a number of programs, including an Advanced Placement program, special programs through the Arcata Arts Institute, and a variety of student clubs.

== Media ==
The Eureka Times-Standard is the only major regional daily publication covering Arcata. The Arcata Eye was a former weekly newspaper covering Arcata and Blue Lake until it merged with the McKinleyville Press newspaper in 2013 to become the Mad River Union. The Northcoast Environmental Center, located in Arcata, has published Econews as a monthly journal since 1971. CPH produces a weekly student-run paper titled The Lumberjack, a student-run, general-interest magazine, the Osprey, published once a semester, and El Leñador, Cal Poly Humboldt's first bilingual, student-run newspaper. Arcata is also home to CPH's student-run radio station, KRFH 105.1 FM, which is notable for being one of a select few freeform radio stations still on the air today. The town has a number of small zines and blogs that cover a variety of local issues, including youth culture and homelessness.

== Transportation ==
=== Roads ===
U.S. Route 101 extends north and south and bisects the city. The downtown has several overcrossings; Arcata is considered a fairly walkable community. State Route 299 connects to U.S. Route 101 at the northern end of Arcata. SR 299 begins at this point and extends easterly towards Weaverville, Redding, Alturas, and Nevada. SR 255 connects to U.S. Route 101 at the southern end of Arcata on Samoa Blvd. and to the west of US-101 passes through Manila. Bridge access (left at first controlled intersection) leads to Eureka through Woodley island and Tuluwat island (using three bridges) ending on 4th (south 101) and 5th (north 101) streets in Eureka, CA. Used as an alternate route to the US-101, its speed limit is 55 mph (89 km/h) though, unlike the speed on Highway 101 – which from the Bayside cutoff to Gallagher lane north 101 and x street south 101 is 50 mph (80 km/h) due to a safety corridor.

The highways connecting Arcata to areas outside Humboldt County include long segments of winding two-lane road traversing remote mountains and river canyons, portions of which may close after extensive rain and wind storms, requiring possibly long detours. While Arcata, Eureka, Fortuna and the Redwood Coast region are part of the most populous state in the US, the Redwood Coast region is also one of the most remote locations along the continental US west coast. The city also offers several cycling trails.

=== Transit ===
Redwood Transit System (RTS) is the major provider of public bus transportation in Humboldt County, with several stops in Arcata. Arcata and Mad River Transit Service (AMRTS) is the local bus and serves Arcata and Sunny Brae. Dial-A-Ride service is available from Humboldt Senior Resource Center through an application process.

Transit and long-haul bus services, including Amtrak and Greyhound, use the Arcata Transit Center at 925 E Street as their central interchange point for Arcata.

The Amtrak Thruway 7 bus provides daily connections to/from Arcata and Martinez to the south, including stops at points in between along the Highway 101 corridor. Additional Amtrak connections are available from Martinez station.

=== Air ===
The closest airport is the Arcata-Eureka Airport located in McKinleyville. This airport was built by the Army Air Corps in World War II in a particularly foggy location, as a site to test fog dispersal techniques. No successful dispersal method appears to have been found, and after demobilization the airfield was given to the County of Humboldt as a civilian airport. This airport is one of the foggiest in the world, resulting in frequent flight delays or cancellations. Some arriving flights are diverted to Redding, California, a three-hour drive to the east, or Crescent City, about 90 miles (140 km) to the north.

=== Water ===
There is a deep-water port in nearby Eureka. In 1854, the Union Wharf and Plank Walk Company built redwood plank and rails 2.7 miles (4.3 km) out into the deeper water of Arcata Bay, providing Arcata with a deep-water seaport. This was initially a horse-drawn railroad, though it was later converted to steam. This eventually became the Arcata and Mad River Railroad (now defunct). Arcata's wharf is long gone, and only a few piers can be seen at low tide. Some very small recreational boats can be launched from the foot of I street at the Arcata Marsh at high tide. However, at low tide Arcata Bay becomes a vast mud flat and a challenge to boaters.

== Notable people ==
- Edward N. Ament (1860–1949) – mayor of Berkeley, California
- Christopher Buckley (b. 1948) – poet
- Raymond Carver (1938–1988) – writer
- Wesley Chesbro (b. 1951) – politician
- Don Durdan (1920–1971) – professional American football and basketball player
- Robert A. Gearheart (b. 1938) – Cal Poly Humboldt professor
- Steven Hackett (b. 1960) – economist, Cal Poly Humboldt professor
- Bret Harte (1836–1902) – writer
- Dan Hauser (b. 1942) – politician
- Garth Iorg (b. 1954) – professional baseball player
- Christa Johnson (b. 1958) – professional golfer
- Naomi Lang (b. 1978) – Olympic ice dancer
- Nate Quarry (b. 1972) – Mixed Martial Arts fighter
- Eric Rofes (1954–2006) – writer
- Steve Sillett (b. 1968) – botanist
- Greg Stafford (1948–2018) – game designer
- James Allen Taylor (b. 1937) – decorated Army officer
- Willi Unsoeld (1926–1979) – mountaineer
- Don Van Vliet (aka Captain Beefheart) (1941–2010) – artist
- Gary Wilson (b. 1970) – professional baseball pitcher

== Sister city ==
- Camoapa, Nicaragua

== See also ==
- Arcata Community Forest
- Humboldt County Historical Society
- Cal Poly Humboldt Natural History Museum
- Northwestern Pacific Railroad
