= Arcata Community Forest =

Forest in California, United States

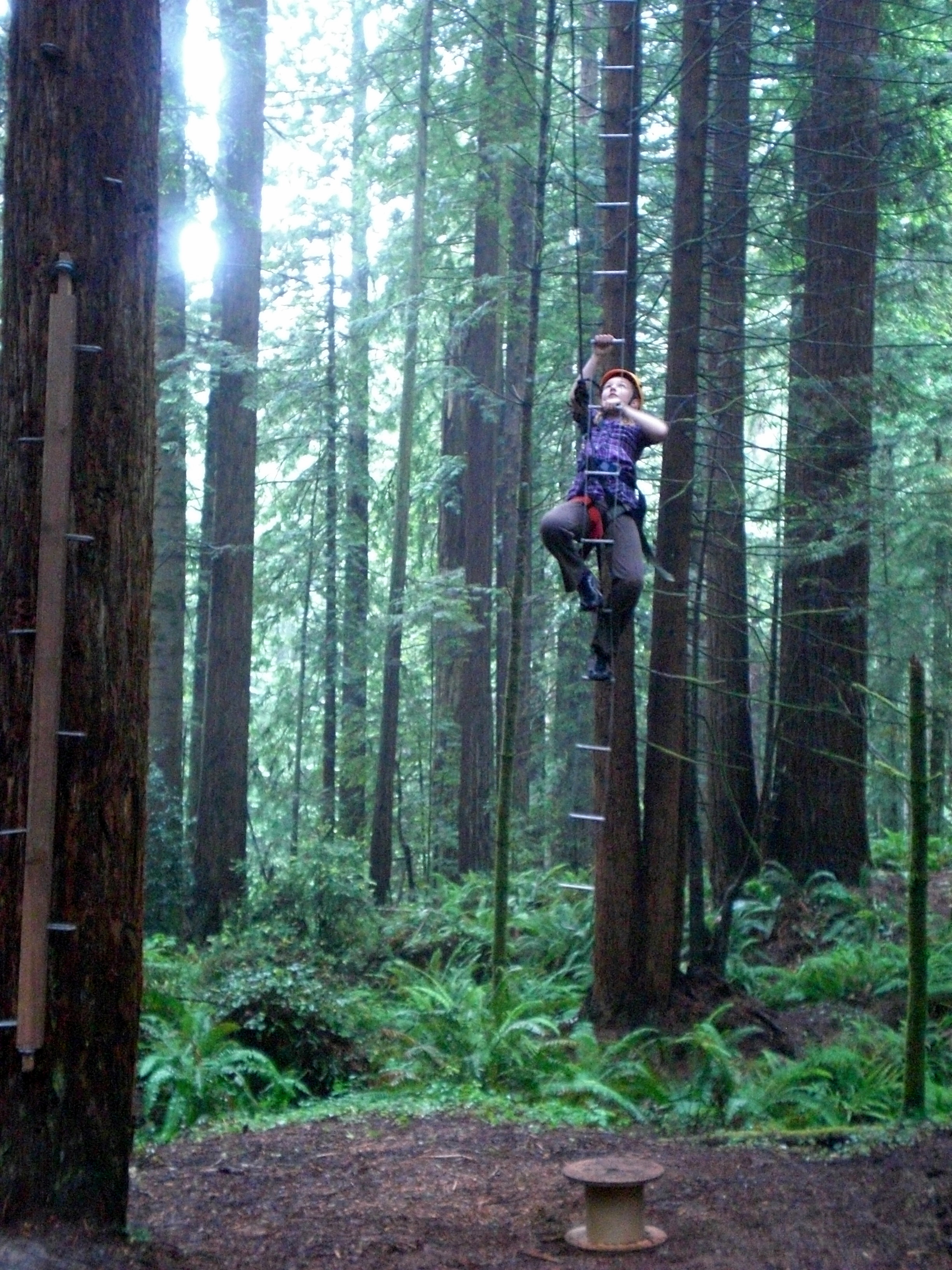
- Climbing under the auspices of the City of Arcata's Recreation Division in the Arcata municipal forest.
- Interactive map of Arcata Community Forest

Geography
- Coordinates: 40.87393°N 124.05839°W

The Arcata Community Forest is part of the parks and recreation system of the City of Arcata, California, United States. It was originally created in 1955 from six forest tracts: Gannon Tract, Burns Tract, Preston Tract I, Preston Tract II, Reclamation Water Co. Tract, and Brizard Tract. The main forest area covers 793 acres (3.21 km^{2}). The park was the culmination of efforts to combine tracts of forest land located east of the city together in one continuous section of city-owned second-growth coast redwood forest. Over a 50-year period, 622 acres (2.52 km^{2}) were obtained in several purchases. In November 2006, the 171-acre (0.69 km^{2}) Sunny Brae Forest was added to the Community Forest. The city also owns and manages the 1,200-acre (4.9 km^{2}) Jacoby Creek Forest. The City owns a total of 2,350 acres (9.5 km^{2}) of forest.

Prior to European settlement, the land which makes up Arcata Community Forest was occupied by the indigenous Wiyot people. The Wiyot community used the Arcata forestlands for hunting, fishing, as well as other practices. In the 1850s, European settlers began to occupy the Humboldt Bay region and Wiyot people were driven off the land.

Until 1964, this land was used as the municipal water source, obtaining its supply from Gannon Creek, Preston Creek (Jolly Giant), and Janes Creek. Historically, steelhead and salmon migrated upstream into all the creeks before logging and poor water quality wiped them out. It is currently used for education, recreation, wildlife habitat, and sustainable timber harvesting. Many of Arcata's small streams possess their headwaters in the Arcata Community Forest.

In 1979, the citizens of Arcata passed the "Forest Management and Parkland Initiative". The Arcata Community Forest was the first municipal forest certified in the US under the Forest Stewardship Council. This was intended to develop an ecologically responsible long-term forest management program to generate income to develop and acquire parkland. Generating $500,000–$700,000 of revenue per year from timber harvesting, the forest is self-supporting, and excess net revenue is used to maintain other city parkland and open space.

The forest is popular with hikers, birders, and has a history of (illegal) camping that remains unpopular with some locals who report being harassed or intimidated by the homeless that have "staked a claim" to both public and private property. According to the Humboldt Housing and Homeless Coalition (HHHC), 74% of homeless individuals were camping in Humboldt County. Approximately 15 illegal, two- to five-person camps are cleaned up annually by the Arcata City Police and Environmental Service Departments in the community forest.

Parking and main trail head can be accessed from an unmarked road at Bayview and E 12th St. The Redwood Lodge is located at the park; it is available for rent to host activities and contains tables, chairs, and a small kitchen with appliances.
