= 2023–24 Luge World Cup =

Luge championship season

Discipline	Men	Women
Singles Overall	(Germany) Max Langenhan (1)	(Germany) Julia Taubitz (4)
Singles	(Germany) Max Langenhan (1)	(Germany) Julia Taubitz (2)
Singles Sprint	(Germany) Max Langenhan (1)	(Germany) Julia Taubitz (5)
Doubles Overall	(Austria) Thomas Steu (2) / Wolfgang Kindl (1)	(Italy) Andrea Vötter / Marion Oberhofer (2)
Doubles	(Austria) Thomas Steu (2) / Wolfgang Kindl (1)	(Germany) Jessica Degenhardt / Cheyenne Rosenthal (1)
Doubles Sprint	(Latvia) Mārtiņš Bots / Roberts Plūme (1)	(Austria) Selina Egle / Lara Kipp (2)
- Team Relay: Germany (18)

Competition
Edition	47th	47th
Locations	7	7

The 2023–24 Luge World Cup (official: Eberspächer Luge World Cup) was a multi-race series over a season of Luge, organised by International Luge Federation (FIL).

The season started on 8 December 2023 in Lake Placid, United States, and concluded on 3 March 2024 in Sigulda, Latvia.

The season featured a break in January for the FIL World Luge Championships in Altenberg, Germany.

== Map of world cup hosts ==
All 7 locations hosting world cup events in this season (including Altenberg – venue of the World Championships).

Europe

North America

World Championships also as European Championships

== Schedule ==
Stage	Location	Date	Men's Singles	Women's Singles	Men's Doubles	Women's Doubles	Sprint	Team	Details
1	(United States) Lake Placid	7–9 December 2023	●	●	●	●	●		
2	(Canada) Whistler	14–16 December 2023	●	●	●	●		●	
3	(Germany) Winterberg	5–7 January 2024	●	●	●	●		●	
4	(Austria) Innsbruck-Igls	12–14 January 2024	●	●	●	●		●	also European Championships
WC	(Germany) Altenberg	26–28 January 2024	●	●	●	●	●	●	World Championships (not included in the World Cup)
5	(Germany) Altenberg	2–4 February 2024	●	●	●	●		●	
6	(Germany) Oberhof	9–11 February 2024	●	●	●	●		●	
7	(Germany) Oberhof	16–18 February 2024	●	●	●	●	●		
8	(Latvia) Sigulda	23–25 February 2024	●	●	●	●	●		
9	(Latvia) Sigulda	2–3 March 2024	●	●	●	●		●	

== Men ==
=== Calendar ===
#	Date	Place (In brackets Stage)	Discipline	Winner	Time	Second	Time	Third	Time	R.
1	8 December 2023	(United States) Lake Placid (1)	Singles	(Germany) Max Langenhan	1:41.952 (50.944 / 51.008)	(Austria) Jonas Müller	1:42.398 (51.164 / 51.234)	(Austria) Nico Gleirscher	1:42.585 (51.270 / 51.315)	
2	8 December 2023	(United States) Lake Placid (1)	Doubles	United States; Zachary DiGregorio; Sean Hollander	1:27.630 (43.790 / 43.840)	Austria; Thomas Steu; Wolfgang Kindl	1:27.682 (43.645 / 44.037)	Austria; Juri Gatt; Riccardo Schöpf	1:27.702 (43.851 / 43.851)	
3	9 December 2023	(United States) Lake Placid (1)	Singles Sprint	(Germany) Max Langenhan	33.257	(Germany) Felix Loch	33.560	(Austria) Nico Gleirscher	33.595	
4	9 December 2023	(United States) Lake Placid (1)	Doubles Sprint	Latvia; Mārtiņš Bots; Roberts Plūme	37.872	Austria; Thomas Steu; Wolfgang Kindl	37.877	Germany; Tobias Wendl; Tobias Arlt	38.019	
5	15 December 2023	(Canada) Whistler (2)	Singles	(Germany) Max Langenhan	1:40.093 (50.091 / 50.002)	(Austria) Jonas Müller	1:40.348 (50.214 / 50.134)	(Latvia) Kristers Aparjods	1:40.572 (50.314 / 50.258)	
6	15 December 2023	(Canada) Whistler (2)	Doubles	Germany; Tobias Wendl; Tobias Arlt	1:17.300 (38.668 / 38.632)	Austria; Thomas Steu; Wolfgang Kindl	1:17.378 (38.624 / 38.754)	Germany; Hannes Orlamünder; Paul Constantin Gubitz	1:17.405 (38.713 / 38.692)	
7	6 January 2024	(Germany) Winterberg (3)	Doubles	Austria; Juri Gatt; Riccardo Schöpf	1:26.145 (43.105 / 43.040)	Germany; Tobias Wendl; Tobias Arlt	1:26.211 (43.271 / 42.940)	Germany; Hannes Orlamünder; Paul Constantin Gubitz	1:26.236 (43.158 / 43.078)	
8	7 January 2024	(Germany) Winterberg (3)	Singles	(Germany) Max Langenhan	1:43.695 (51.885 / 51.810)	(Italy) Dominik Fischnaller	1:43.871 (51.889 / 51.982)	(Latvia) Kristers Aparjods	1:43.877 (51.999 / 51.878)	
55th FIL European Championships 2024 (12–14 January)
9	13 January 2024	(Austria) Innsbruck-Igls (4)	Doubles	Austria; Thomas Steu; Wolfgang Kindl	1:18.690 (39.344 / 39.346)	Latvia; Mārtiņš Bots; Roberts Plūme	1:18.862 (39.414 / 39.448)	Germany; Tobias Wendl; Tobias Arlt	1:18.986 (39.510 / 39.476)	
10	14 January 2024	(Austria) Innsbruck-Igls (4)	Singles	(Austria) Jonas Müller	1:38.655 (49.288 / 49.367)	(Austria) Nico Gleirscher	1:38.981 (49.469 / 49.512)	(Germany) Max Langenhan	1:39.083 (49.599 / 49.484)	
52nd FIL World Luge Championships 2024 (26–28 January)
WCH	26 January 2024	(Germany) Altenberg	Doubles Sprint	Latvia; Mārtiņš Bots; Roberts Plūme	27.863	Austria; Thomas Steu; Wolfgang Kindl	27.895	Austria; Juri Gatt; Riccardo Schöpf	27.973	
WCH	26 January 2024	(Germany) Altenberg	Singles Sprint	(Austria) David Gleirscher	33.001	(Germany) Max Langenhan	33.071	(Latvia) Kristers Aparjods	33.124	
WCH	27 January 2024	(Germany) Altenberg	Singles	(Germany) Max Langenhan	1:47.813 (53.943 / 53.870)	(Austria) Nico Gleirscher	1:48.574 (54.230 / 54.344)	(Germany) Felix Loch	1:48.630 (54.303 / 54.327)	
WCH	27 January 2024	(Germany) Altenberg	Doubles	Austria; Juri Gatt; Riccardo Schöpf	1:22.924 (41.453 / 41.471)	Austria; Thomas Steu; Wolfgang Kindl	1:22.970 (41.506 / 41.464)	Germany; Tobias Wendl; Tobias Arlt	1:23.279 (41.721 / 41.558)	
11	3 February 2024	(Germany) Altenberg (5)	Singles	(Germany) Max Langenhan	1:51.162 (56.360 / 54.802)	(Austria) David Gleirscher	1:51.283 (55.479 / 55.804)	(Latvia) Kristers Aparjods	1:51.289 (55.831 / 55.458)	
12	3 February 2024	(Germany) Altenberg (5)	Doubles	Austria; Juri Gatt; Riccardo Schöpf	1:24.991 (42.531 / 42.460)	Austria; Thomas Steu; Wolfgang Kindl	1:24.999 (42.539 / 42.460)	Italy; Emanuel Rieder; Simon Kainzwaldner	1:25.116 (42.646 / 42.470)	
13	10 February 2024	(Germany) Oberhof (6), (7)	Doubles	Austria; Thomas Steu; Wolfgang Kindl	1:23.928 (42.114 / 41.814)	Germany; Hannes Orlamünder; Paul Constantin Gubitz	1:24.051 (42.161 / 41.890)	Germany; Tobias Wendl; Tobias Arlt	1:24.118 (42.233 / 41.885)	
14	11 February 2024	(Germany) Oberhof (6), (7)	Singles	(Latvia) Kristers Aparjods	1:27.263 (44.031 / 43.232)	(Germany) Max Langenhan	1:27.305 (43.858 / 43.447)	(Austria) David Gleirscher	1:27.381 (44.218 / 43.163)	
15	17 February 2024	(Germany) Oberhof (6), (7)	Singles	(Austria) Jonas Müller	1:26.033 (43.015 / 43.018)	(Germany) Max Langenhan	1:26.109 (43.047 / 43.062)	(Germany) Felix Loch	1:26.131 (43.083 / 43.048)	
16	17 February 2024	(Germany) Oberhof (6), (7)	Doubles	Austria; Thomas Steu; Wolfgang Kindl	1:23.333 (41.552 / 41.781)	Germany; Tobias Wendl; Tobias Arlt	1:23.406 (41.651 / 41.755)	Germany; Hannes Orlamünder; Paul Constantin Gubitz	1:23.452 (41.686 / 41.766)	
17	18 February 2024	(Germany) Oberhof (6), (7)	Singles Sprint	(Germany) Max Langenhan	33.562	(Austria) Jonas Müller	33.586	(Austria) Wolfgang Kindl	33.595	
18	18 February 2024	(Germany) Oberhof (6), (7)	Doubles Sprint	Germany; Hannes Orlamünder; Paul Constantin Gubitz	26.027	Austria; Thomas Steu; Wolfgang Kindl	26.049	Germany; Tobias Wendl; Tobias Arlt	26.123	
19	24 February 2024	(Latvia) Sigulda (8), (9)	Doubles	Latvia; Mārtiņš Bots; Roberts Plūme	1:23.308 (41.516 / 41.792)	Germany; Tobias Wendl; Tobias Arlt	1:23.326 (41.534 / 41.792)	Austria; Thomas Steu; Wolfgang Kindl	1:23.582 (41.734 / 41.848)	
20	25 February 2024	(Latvia) Sigulda (8), (9)	Singles	(Germany) Felix Loch	1:35.650 (43.887 / 43.763)	(Latvia) Kristers Aparjods	1:35.709 (47.841 / 47.868)	(Germany) Max Langenhan	1:35.962 (48.060 / 47.902)	
21	25 February 2024	(Latvia) Sigulda (8), (9)	Singles Sprint	(Germany) Felix Loch	27.223	(Latvia) Kristers Aparjods	27.290	(Austria) David Gleirscher	27.325	
22	25 February 2024	(Latvia) Sigulda (8), (9)	Doubles Sprint	Latvia; Mārtiņš Bots; Roberts Plūme	30.714	Germany; Tobias Wendl; Tobias Arlt	30.801	Italy; Emanuel Rieder; Simon Kainzwaldner	30.843	
23	2 March 2024	(Latvia) Sigulda (8), (9)	Doubles	Latvia; Mārtiņš Bots; Roberts Plūme	1:22.915 (41.412 / 41.503)	Germany; Tobias Wendl; Tobias Arlt	1:23.010 (41.472 / 41.538)	Austria; Thomas Steu; Wolfgang Kindl	1:23.301 (41.574 / 41.727)	
24	3 March 2024	(Latvia) Sigulda (8), (9)	Singles	(Latvia) Kristers Aparjods	1:35.169 (47.676 / 47.493)	(Germany) Felix Loch	1:35.315 (47.644 / 47.671)	(Austria) Nico Gleirscher	1:35.414 (47.659 / 47.755)	

=== Standings ===
==== Singles Overall ====
Rank	after all 12 events	Points
1	(Germany) Max Langenhan	970
2	(Latvia) Kristers Aparjods	841
3	(Germany) Felix Loch	765
4	(Austria) Jonas Müller	723
5	(Austria) David Gleirscher	655
6	(Austria) Nico Gleirscher	653
7	(Italy) Dominik Fischnaller	621
8	(Austria) Wolfgang Kindl	606
9	(United States) Tucker West	447
10	(United States) Jonathan Eric Gustafson	387

==== Singles ====
Rank	after all 9 events	Points
1	(Germany) Max Langenhan	710
2	(Latvia) Kristers Aparjods	660
3	(Austria) Jonas Müller	578
4	(Germany) Felix Loch	520
5	(Austria) Nico Gleirscher	491

==== Singles Sprint ====
Rank	after all 3 events	Points
1	(Germany) Max Langenhan	260
2	(Germany) Felix Loch	245
3	(Latvia) Kristers Aparjods	181
4	(Austria) David Gleirscher	171
5	(Austria) Wolfgang Kindl	167

==== Doubles Overall ====
Rank	after all 12 events	Points
1	(Austria) Thomas Steu / Wolfgang Kindl	966
2	(Germany) Tobias Wendl / Tobias Arlt	885
3	(Latvia) Mārtiņš Bots / Roberts Plūme	876
4	(Germany) Hannes Orlamünder / Paul Constantin Gubitz	736
5	(Austria) Juri Gatt / Riccardo Schöpf	701
6	(Italy) Emanuel Rieder / Simon Kainzwaldner	566
7	(Austria) Yannick Müller / Armin Frauscher (United States) Zachary DiGregorio / Sean Hollander	525
9	(Italy) Ivan Nagler / Fabian Malleier	447
10	(United States) Dana William Kellogg / Frank Ike	406

==== Doubles ====
Rank	after all 9 events	Points
1	(Austria) Thomas Steu / Wolfgang Kindl	741
2	(Germany) Tobias Wendl / Tobias Arlt	660
3	(Latvia) Mārtiņš Bots / Roberts Plūme	630
4	(Austria) Juri Gatt / Riccardo Schöpf	535
5	(Germany) Hannes Orlamünder / Paul Constantin Gubitz	534

==== Doubles Sprint ====
Rank	after all 3 events	Points
1	(Latvia) Mārtiņš Bots / Roberts Plūme	246
2	(Austria) Thomas Steu / Wolfgang Kindl (Germany) Tobias Wendl / Tobias Arlt	225
4	(Germany) Hannes Orlamünder / Paul Constantin Gubitz	202
5	(Austria) Juri Gatt / Riccardo Schöpf	166

== Women ==
=== Calendar ===
#	Date	Place (In brackets Stage)	Discipline	Winner	Time	Second	Time	Third	Time	R.
1	8 December 2023	(United States) Lake Placid (1)	Doubles	Austria; Selina Egle; Lara Kipp	1:28.924 (44.437 / 44.487)	Germany; Dajana Eitberger; Saskia Schirmer	1:29.037 (44.564 / 44.473)	Italy; Andrea Vötter; Marion Oberhofer	1:29.470 (44.716 / 44.754)	
2	9 December 2023	(United States) Lake Placid (1)	Singles	(Austria) Madeleine Egle	1:28.710 (44.050 / 44.660)	(Germany) Julia Taubitz	1:28.898 (44.207 / 44.691)	(United States) Summer Britcher	1:29.117 (44.322 / 44.795)	
3	9 December 2023	(United States) Lake Placid (1)	Doubles Sprint	Austria; Selina Egle; Lara Kipp	38.340	United States; Chevonne Forgan; Sophia Kirkby	38.443	Germany; Dajana Eitberger; Saskia Schirmer	38.477	
4	9 December 2023	(United States) Lake Placid (1)	Singles Sprint	(Germany) Julia Taubitz	37.451	(United States) Ashley Farquharson	37.550	(United States) Emily Sweeney	37.565	
5	15 December 2023	(Canada) Whistler (2)	Singles	(Germany) Julia Taubitz	1:18.066 (39.032 / 39.034)	(Germany) Anna Berreiter	1:18.177 (39.107 / 39.070)	(Germany) Merle Fräbel	1:18.179 (39.130 / 39.049)	
6	16 December 2023	(Canada) Whistler (2)	Doubles	Germany; Jessica Degenhardt; Cheyenne Rosenthal	1:18.371 (39.189 / 39.182)	Germany; Dajana Eitberger; Saskia Schirmer	1:18.451 (39.220 / 39.231)	Italy; Andrea Vötter; Marion Oberhofer	1:18.466 (39.219 / 39.247)	
7	6 January 2024	(Germany) Winterberg (3)	Doubles	Germany; Jessica Degenhardt; Cheyenne Rosenthal	1:27.131 (43.510 / 43.621)	Italy; Andrea Vötter; Marion Oberhofer	1:27.155 (43.552 / 43.603)	Austria; Selina Egle; Lara Kipp	1:27.175 (43.679 / 43.496)	
8	6 January 2024	(Germany) Winterberg (3)	Singles	(Austria) Madeleine Egle	1:51.392 (55.632 / 55.760)	(Germany) Julia Taubitz	1:51.421 (55.668 / 55.753)	(Austria) Hannah Prock	1:51.697 (55.742 / 55.955)	
55th FIL European Championships 2024 (12–14 January)
9	13 January 2024	(Austria) Innsbruck-Igls (4)	Singles	(Austria) Madeleine Egle	1:19.200 (39.599 / 39.601)	(Germany) Julia Taubitz	1:19.224 (39.622 / 39.602)	(Germany) Anna Berreiter	1:19.439 (39.747 / 39.692)	
10	13 January 2024	(Austria) Innsbruck-Igls (4)	Doubles	Germany; Jessica Degenhardt; Cheyenne Rosenthal	1:20.178 (40.114 / 40.064)	Italy; Andrea Vötter; Marion Oberhofer	1:20.192 (40.070 / 40.122)	Latvia; Marta Robežniece; Kitija Bogdanova	1:20.438 (40.262 / 40.176)	
52nd FIL World Luge Championships 2024 (26–28 January)
WCH	26 January 2024	(Germany) Altenberg	Singles Sprint	(Germany) Julia Taubitz	37.702	(Switzerland) Natalie Maag	37.774	(Latvia) Elīna Ieva Vītola	37.813	
WCH	26 January 2024	(Germany) Altenberg	Doubles Sprint	Italy; Andrea Vötter; Marion Oberhofer	28.421	Latvia; Anda Upīte; Zane Kaluma	28.438	Latvia; Marta Robežniece; Kitija Bogdanova	28.467	
WCH	27 January 2024	(Germany) Altenberg	Doubles	Austria; Selina Egle; Lara Kipp	1:24.761 (42.364 / 42.397)	Latvia; Anda Upīte; Zane Kaluma	1:24.811 (42.334 / 42.477)	United States; Chevonne Forgan; Sophia Kirkby	1:24.897 (42.563 / 42.334)	
WCH	28 January 2024	(Germany) Altenberg	Singles	(Austria) Lisa Schulte	1:43.901 (52.082 / 51.819)	(Germany) Julia Taubitz	1:44.005 (52.154 / 51.851)	(Austria) Madeleine Egle	1:44.076 (52.192 / 51.884)	
11	3 February 2024	(Germany) Altenberg (5)	Doubles	Italy; Andrea Vötter; Marion Oberhofer	1:25.337 (42.810 / 42.527)	Latvia; Anda Upīte; Kitija Bogdanova	1:25.538 (42.781 / 42.757)	Germany; Dajana Eitberger; Saskia Schirmer	1:25.548 (42.800 / 42.748)	
12	4 February 2024	(Germany) Altenberg (5)	Singles	(Germany) Julia Taubitz	1:47.971 (54.774 / 53.197)	(Latvia) Elīna Ieva Vītola	1:48.120 (54.584 / 53.536)	(Austria) Lisa Schulte	1:48.268 (54.526 / 53.742)	
13	10 February 2024	(Germany) Oberhof (6), (7)	Doubles	Germany; Jessica Degenhardt; Cheyenne Rosenthal	1:26.244 (43.195 / 43.049)	Italy; Andrea Vötter; Marion Oberhofer	1:26.277 (43.202 / 43.075)	Austria; Selina Egle; Lara Kipp	1:26.365 (43.121 / 43.244)	
14	10 February 2024	(Germany) Oberhof (6), (7)	Singles	(Germany) Merle Fräbel	1:24.956 (42.564 / 42.392)	(Austria) Madeleine Egle	1:25.080 (42.878 / 42.202)	(Germany) Julia Taubitz	1:25.108 (42.977 / 42.131)	
15	17 February 2024	(Germany) Oberhof (6), (7)	Doubles	Germany; Dajana Eitberger; Saskia Schirmer	1:25.889 (42.934 / 42.955)	Italy; Andrea Vötter; Marion Oberhofer	1:25.897 (42.858 / 43.039)	Germany; Jessica Degenhardt; Cheyenne Rosenthal	1:25.898 (42.852 / 43.046)	
16	18 February 2024	(Germany) Oberhof (6), (7)	Singles	(Germany) Julia Taubitz	1:24.426 (41.978 / 42.448)	(Germany) Anna Berreiter	1:24.477 (42.064 / 42.413)	(Austria) Madeleine Egle	1:24.542 (41.952 / 42.590)	
17	18 February 2024	(Germany) Oberhof (6), (7)	Doubles Sprint	Austria; Selina Egle; Lara Kipp	26.425	Germany; Dajana Eitberger; Saskia Schirmer	26.537	Italy; Andrea Vötter; Marion Oberhofer	26.539	
18	18 February 2024	(Germany) Oberhof (6), (7)	Single Sprint	(Germany) Julia Taubitz	25.864	(Switzerland) Natalie Maag	25.958	(Germany) Anna Berreiter	26.014	
19	24 February 2024	(Latvia) Sigulda (8), (9)	Singles	(Germany) Anna Berreiter	1:23.405 (41.799 / 41.606)	(Latvia) Elina Ieva Vitola	1:23.423 (41.779 / 41.644)	(Germany) Julia Taubitz	1:23.486 (41.757 / 41.729)	
20	24 February 2024	(Latvia) Sigulda (8), (9)	Doubles	Germany; Jessica Degenhardt; Cheyenne Rosenthal	1:25.743 (42.610 / 43.133)	Italy; Andrea Vötter; Marion Oberhofer	1:25.828 (42.728 / 43.100)	Germany; Dajana Eitberger; Saskia Schirmer	1:25.851 (42.758 / 43.093)	
21	25 February 2024	(Latvia) Sigulda (8), (9)	Singles Sprint	(Germany) Julia Taubitz	30.652	(Latvia) Kendija Aparjode	30.760	(United States) Emily Sweeney	30.858	
22	25 February 2024	(Latvia) Sigulda (8), (9)	Doubles Sprint	Italy; Andrea Vötter; Marion Oberhofer	31.187	Austria; Selina Egle; Lara Kipp	31.261	Germany; Dajana Eitberger; Saskia Schirmer	31.335	
23	2 March 2024	(Latvia) Sigulda (8), (9)	Doubles	Germany; Jessica Degenhardt; Cheyenne Rosenthal	1:24.648 (42.271 / 42.377)	Germany; Dajana Eitberger; Saskia Schirmer	1:24.902 (42.448 / 42.454)	Austria; Selina Egle; Lara Kipp	1:24.931 (42.486 / 42.445)	
24	3 March 2024	(Latvia) Sigulda (8), (9)	Singles	(Latvia) Elīna Ieva Vītola	1:23.176 (41.685 / 41.491)	(Germany) Anna Berreiter	1:23.250 (41.747 / 41.503)	(Germany) Merle Fräbel	1:23.291 (41.819 / 41.472)	

=== Standings ===
==== Singles Overall ====
Rank	after all 12 events	Points
1	(Germany) Julia Taubitz	1034
2	(Germany) Anna Berreiter	791
3	(Austria) Madeleine Egle	742
4	(Latvia) Elīna Ieva Vītola	622
5	(Austria) Lisa Schulte	616
6	(United States) Ashley Farquharson	612
7	(Germany) Merle Fräbel	611
8	(United States) Emily Sweeney	583
9	(Latvia) Kendija Aparjode	559
10	(Switzerland) Natalie Maag	522

==== Singles ====
Rank	after all 9 events	Points
1	(Germany) Julia Taubitz	734
2	(Germany) Anna Berreiter	651
3	(Austria) Madeleine Egle	622
4	(Latvia) Elīna Ieva Vītola	522
5	(Austria) Lisa Schulte	469

==== Singles Sprint ====
Rank	after all 3 events	Points
1	(Germany) Julia Taubitz	300
2	(United States) Emily Sweeney	190
3	(Latvia) Kendija Aparjode	186
4	(Switzerland) Natalie Maag	170
5	(United States) Ashley Farquharson	166

==== Doubles Overall ====
Rank	after all 12 events	Points
1	(Italy) Andrea Vötter / Marion Oberhofer	955
2	(Germany) Jessica Degenhardt / Cheyenne Rosenthal	895
3	(Germany) Dajana Eitberger / Saskia Schirmer	886
4	(Austria) Selina Egle / Lara Kipp	859
5	(United States) Chevonne Forgan / Sophia Kirkby	706
6	(Ukraine) Olena Stetskiv / Oleksandra Mokh	449
7	(United States) Maya Chan / Reannyn Weiler	426
8	(Romania) Raluca Strămăturaru / Mihaela-Carmen Manolescu	420
9	(China) Adikeyoumu Gulijienaiti / Jiaying Zhao	343
10	(Poland) Nikola Domowicz / Dominika Piwkowska	293

==== Doubles ====
Rank	after all 9 events	Points
1	(Germany) Jessica Degenhardt / Cheyenne Rosenthal	780
2	(Italy) Andrea Vötter / Marion Oberhofer	725
3	(Germany) Dajana Eitberger / Saskia Schirmer	661
4	(Austria) Selina Egle / Lara Kipp	574
5	(United States) Chevonne Forgan / Sophia Kirkby	511

==== Doubles Sprint ====
Rank	after all 3 events	Points
1	(Austria) Selina Egle / Lara Kipp	285
2	(Italy) Andrea Vötter / Marion Oberhofer	230
3	(Germany) Dajana Eitberger / Saskia Schirmer	225
4	(United States) Chevonne Forgan / Sophia Kirkby	195
5	(Ukraine) Olena Stetskiv / Oleksandra Moch	125

== Team Relay ==
#	Date	Place (In brackets Stage)	Winner	Time	Second	Time	Third	Time	R.
1	16 December 2023	(Canada) Whistler (2)	Germany	2:48.665	Austria	2:49.215	United States	2:49.311	
2	7 January 2024	(Germany) Winterberg (3)	Germany	3:11.425	Austria	3:11.468	United States	3:12.676	
55th FIL European Championships 2024 (12–14 January)
3	14 January 2024	(Austria) Innsbruck-Igls (4)	Austria	2:52.190	Germany	2:52.376	Italy	2:52.651	
52nd FIL World Luge Championships 2024 (26–28 January)
WCH	28 January 2024	(Germany) Altenberg	Germany	3:10.869	United States	3:11.227	Latvia	3:11.275	
4	4 February 2024	(Germany) Altenberg (5)	Latvia	3:14.445	United States	3:15.448	Romania	3:16.301	
5	11 February 2024	(Germany) Oberhof (6)	Germany	3:12.942	Latvia	3:13.092	Austria	3:13.230	
6	3 March 2024	(Latvia) Sigulda (9)	Germany	2:57.516	Latvia	2:57.657	United States	2:58.522	

=== Rankings ===
Rank	after all 6 events	Points
1	Germany	540
2	Austria	446
3	United States	410
4	Latvia	380
5	Italy	300
6	Ukraine	290
7	Romania	205
8	China	185
9	Poland	148
10	Canada	50

== Podium table by nation ==
Table showing the World Cup podium places (gold–1st place, silver–2nd place, bronze–3rd place) by the countries represented by the athletes.

Rank	Nation	Gold	Silver	Bronze	Total
1	Germany	29	21	21	71
2	Austria	14	14	16	44
3	Latvia	8	9	4	21
4	Italy	2	6	6	14
5	United States	1	3	6	10
6	Switzerland	0	1	0	1
7	Romania	0	0	1	1
Totals (7 entries)		54	54	54	162

== Points distribution ==
The table shows the number of points won in the 2023–24 Luge World Cup for men and women.

Place	1	2	3	4	5	6	7	8	9	10	11	12	13	14	15	16	17	18	19	20
Singles, Doubles & Relay	100	85	70	60	55	50	46	42	39	36	34	32	30	28	26	25	24	23	22	21
