= 2025–26 Luge World Cup =

Luge championship season

Discipline	Men	Women
Singles	(Germany) Felix Loch (8)	(Germany) Julia Taubitz (6)
Doubles	Germany; Tobias Wendl; Tobias Arlt (7)	Austria; Selina Egle; Lara Kipp (2)
- Team Relay: Austria

Competition
Edition	49th	49th
Locations	9	9

The 2025–26 FIL Luge World Cup (official: Eberspächer Luge World Cup), was the 49th World Cup season for men and women as the highest level of international luge competitions.

The season started on 6 December 2025 in Winterberg, Germany and concluded on 8 March 2026 in Altenberg, Germany

The season featured a break in February for the 2026 Winter Olympics in Cortina d'Ampezzo, Italy, whose results are not included in the World Cup standings.

== Season overview ==
A total of nine World Cup weekends are planned on seven routes in four countries.

== Map of world cup hosts ==
The following list contains all 9 World Cup hosts of the season (including Cortina d'Ampezzo - host of the luge events at the 2026 Winter Olympics).

Europe	North America 2025–26 Luge World Cup (North America)

== Men ==
=== Calendar ===
No.	Date	Place (In brackets Stage)	Discipline	Winner	Time	Second	Time	Third	Time	R.
1	6–7 December 2025	(Germany) Winterberg I (1)	Singles	(Germany) Felix Loch	1:43.160 (51.750 / 51.410)	(Austria) Jonas Müller	1:43.250 (51.835 / 51.415)	(Germany) Max Langenhan	1:43.428 (51.816 / 51.612)	
2	6–7 December 2025	(Germany) Winterberg I (1)	Doubles	Austria; Juri Gatt; Riccardo Schöpf	1:25.609 (42.723 / 42.886)	Germany; Tobias Wendl; Tobias Arlt	1:25.717 (42.783 / 42.934)	Austria; Yannick Müller; Armin Frauscher	1:25.801 (42.811 / 42.990)	
3	12–13 December 2025	(United States) Park City (2)	Singles	(Austria) Jonas Müller	1:29.640 (44.652 / 44.988)	(Germany) Max Langenhan	1:29.897 (44.806 / 45.091)	(Italy) Leon Felderer	1:30.148 (44.866 / 45.282)	
4	12–13 December 2025	(United States) Park City (2)	Doubles	Germany; Toni Eggert; Florian Müller	1:26.222 (43.075 / 43.147)	United States; Zachary Di Gregorio; Sean Hollander	1:26.273 (43.015 / 43.258)	Italy; Ivan Nagler; Fabian Malleier	1:26.356 (43.132 / 43.224)	
5	19–20 December 2025	(United States) Lake Placid(3)	Singles	(Germany) Felix Loch	1:41.766 (50.858 / 50.908)	(Germany) Max Langenhan	1:41.820 (50.920 / 50.900)	(Austria) Wolfgang Kindl	1:41.969 (51.067 / 50.902)	
6	19–20 December 2025	(United States) Lake Placid(3)	Doubles	United States; Marcus Mueller; Ansel Haugsjaa	1:27.509 (43.766 / 43.743)	Latvia; Mārtiņš Bots; Roberts Plūme	1:27.567 (43.851 / 43.716)	Austria; Yannick Müller; Armin Frauscher	1:27.649 (43.823 / 43.826)	
7	3–4 January 2026	(Latvia) Sigulda (4)	Singles	(Germany) Felix Loch	1:35.409 (47.738 / 47.671)	(Austria) Jonas Müller	1:35.490 (47.776 / 47.714)	(Germany) Max Langenhan	1:35.508 (47.801 / 47.707)	
8	3–4 January 2026	(Latvia) Sigulda (4)	Doubles	Latvia; Eduards Ševics-Mikeļševics; Lūkass Krasts	1:23.508 (41.715 / 41.793)	Germany; Tobias Wendl; Tobias Arlt	1:23.586 (41.751 / 41.835)	Latvia; Mārtiņš Bots; Roberts Plūme	1:23.593 (41.805 / 41.788)	
9	10–11 January 2026	(Germany) Winterberg II (5)	Singles	(Austria) Jonas Müller	1:42.899 (51.299 / 51.600)	(Germany) Felix Loch	1:43.005 (51.581 / 51.423)	(Austria) Nico Gleirscher	1:43.016 (51.486 / 51.530)	
10	10–11 January 2026	(Germany) Winterberg II (5)	Doubles	Germany; Tobias Wendl; Tobias Arlt	1:25.599 (42.757 / 42.842)	Austria; Thomas Steu; Wolfgang Kindl	1:25.653 (42.719 / 42.934)	Austria; Juri Gatt; Riccardo Schöpf	1:25.688 (42.767 / 42.921)	
57th FIL European Championships 2026 (17–18 January)
11	17–18 January 2026	(Germany) Oberhof I (6)	Singles	(Austria) Jonas Müller	1:24.549 (42.275 / 42.274)	(Germany) Felix Loch	1:24.640 (42.351 / 42.289)	(Germany) Max Langenhan	1:24.824 (42.513 / 42.311)	
12	17–18 January 2026	(Germany) Oberhof I (6)	Doubles	Germany; Tobias Wendl; Tobias Arlt	1:22.687 (41.360 / 41.327)	Germany; Toni Eggert; Florian Müller	1:22.941 (41.420 / 41.521)	Austria; Juri Gatt; Riccardo Schöpf	1:23.076 (41.539 / 41.537)	
13	23–24 January 2026	(Germany) Oberhof II (7)	Singles	(Germany) Felix Loch	1:24.673 (42.288 / 42.385)	(Austria) Jonas Müller	1:24.762 (42.313 / 42.449)	(Germany) Max Langenhan	1:24.994 (42.420 / 42.574)	
14	23–24 January 2026	(Germany) Oberhof II (7)	Doubles	Germany; Tobias Wendl; Tobias Arlt	1:22.575 (41.274 / 41.301)	Austria; Thomas Steu; Wolfgang Kindl	1:22.727 (41.305 / 41.422)	Austria; Juri Gatt; Riccardo Schöpf	1:22.785 (41.374 / 41.411)	
XXV Olympic Winter Games (7–12 February) (Note: not included in the World Cup)
OLY	7–12 February 2026	(Italy) Cortina d'Ampezzo	Singles	(Germany) Max Langenhan	3:31.191 (52.924 / 52.902 / 52.705 / 52.660)	(Austria) Jonas Müller	3:31.787 (52.959 / 53.029 / 52.837 / 52.962)	(Italy) Dominik Fischnaller	3:32.125 (53.085 / 53.039 / 52.949 / 53.052)	
OLY	7–12 February 2026	(Italy) Cortina d'Ampezzo	Doubles	Italy; Emanuel Rieder; Simon Kainzwaldner	1:45.086 (52.499 / 52.587)	Austria; Thomas Steu; Wolfgang Kindl	1:45.154 (52.485 / 52.669)	Germany; Tobias Wendl; Tobias Arlt	1:45.176 (52.583 / 52.593)	
15	28 February–1 March 2026	(Switzerland) St. Moritz (8)	Singles	(Germany) Max Langenhan	2:12.402 (1:06.061 / 1:06.341)	(Germany) Felix Loch	2:12.749 (1:06.256 / 1:06.493)	(Austria) Jonas Müller	2:13.160 (1:06.053 / 1:07.107)	
16	28 February–1 March 2026	(Switzerland) St. Moritz (8)	Doubles	Austria; Thomas Steu; Wolfgang Kindl	1:46.693 (53.235 / 53.458)	Italy; Ivan Nagler; Fabian Malleier	1:46.697 (53.391 / 53.306)	Germany; Tobias Wendl; Tobias Arlt	1:46.807 (53.394 / 53.413)	
17	7–8 March 2026	(Germany) Altenberg (9)	Singles	(Germany) Felix Loch	1:46.069 (53.071 / 52.998)	(Italy) Dominik Fischnaller	1:46.433 (53.313 / 53.120)	(Austria) David Gleirscher	1:46.503 (53.323 / 53.180)	
18	7–8 March 2026	(Germany) Altenberg (9)	Doubles	Austria; Thomas Steu; Wolfgang Kindl	1:22.754 (41.149 / 41.605)	Austria; Juri Gatt; Riccardo Schöpf	1:22.880 (41.297 / 41.583)	Germany; Toni Eggert; Florian Müller	1:22.904 (41.291 / 41.613)	

=== Standings ===
==== Singles ====
Rank	after all 9 events	Points
1	(Germany) Felix Loch	801
2	(Austria) Jonas Müller	685
3	(Germany) Max Langenhan	605
4	(Austria) Nico Gleirscher	485
5	(Austria) Wolfgang Kindl	444
6	(Latvia) Kristers Aparjods	425
7	(Latvia) Gints Bērziņš	358
8	(Austria) David Gleirscher	357
9	(Italy) Dominik Fischnaller	348
10	(Germany) David Nößler	346

==== Doubles ====
Rank	after all 9 events	Points
1	(Germany) Tobias Wendl / Tobias Arlt	636
2	(Austria) Thomas Steu / Wolfgang Kindl	605
3	(Austria) Juri Gatt / Riccardo Schöpf	599
4	(Germany) Toni Eggert / Florian Müller	534
5	(Latvia) Mārtiņš Bots / Roberts Plūme	500
6	(Italy) Ivan Nagler / Fabian Malleier	435
7	(Latvia) Eduards Ševics-Mikeļševics / Lūkass Krasts	431
8	(Austria) Yannick Müller / Armin Frauscher	422
9	(Germany) Hannes Orlamuender / Paul Constanzin Gubitz	375
10	(Italy) Emanuel Rieder / Simon Kainzwaldner	286

== Women ==
=== Calendar ===
No.	Date	Place (In brackets Stage)	Discipline	Winner	Time	Second	Time	Third	Time	R.
1	6–7 December 2025	(Germany) Winterberg I (1)	Singles	(Austria) Hannah Prock	1:51.648 (55.742 / 55.906)	(Germany) Merle Fräbel	1:51.678 (55.874 / 55.804)	(Austria) Dorothea Schwarz	1:51.857 (55.786 / 56.071)	
2	6–7 December 2025	(Germany) Winterberg I (1)	Doubles	Germany; Jessica Degenhardt; Cheyenne Rosenthal	1:26.881 (43.308 / 43.573)	Austria; Selina Egle; Lara Kipp	1:26.950 (43.368 / 43.582)	Germany; Dajana Eitberger; Magdalena Matschina	1:27.015 (43.463 / 43.552)	
3	12–13 December 2025	(United States) Park City (2)	Singles	(United States) Summer Britcher	1:26.961 (43.291 / 43.670)	(Italy) Verena Hofer	1:27.066 (43.396 / 43.670)	(United States) Ashley Farquharson	1:27.070 (43.539 / 43.531)	
4	12–13 December 2025	(United States) Park City (2)	Doubles	Germany; Dajana Eitberger; Magdalena Matschina	1:27.140 (43.514 / 43.626)	Austria; Selina Egle; Lara Kipp	1:27.416 (43.666 / 43.750)	Germany; Jessica Degenhardt; Cheyenne Rosenthal	1:27.648 (43.799 / 43.849)	
5	19–20 December 2025	(United States) Lake Placid(3)	Singles	(Germany) Julia Taubitz	1:28.824 (44.490 / 44.334)	(United States) Ashley Farquharson	1:28.956 (44.478 / 44.478)	(United States) Summer Britcher	1:29.054 (44.610 / 44.444)	
6	19–20 December 2025	(United States) Lake Placid(3)	Doubles	Austria; Selina Egle; Lara Kipp	1:28.310 (44.151 / 44.159)	Germany; Dajana Eitberger; Magdalena Matschina	1:28.594 (44.275 / 44.319)	United States; Chevonne Forgan; Sophia Kirkby	1:29.119 (44.681 / 44.438)	
7	3–4 January 2026	(Latvia) Sigulda (4)	Singles	(United States) Summer Britcher	1:23.840 (41.938 / 41.902)	(Austria) Lisa Schulte	1:23.877 (41.934 / 41.943)	(Germany) Julia Taubitz	1:23.931 (41.933 / 41.998)	
8	3–4 January 2026	(Latvia) Sigulda (4)	Doubles	Austria; Selina Egle; Lara Kipp	1:24.814 (42.385 / 42.429)	Germany; Dajana Eitberger; Magdalena Matschina	1:24.845 (42.345 / 42.500)	Italy; Andrea Vötter; Marion Oberhofer	1:25.017 (42.583 / 42.434)	
9	10–11 January 2026	(Germany) Winterberg II (5)	Singles	(Austria) Hannah Prock	1:51.885 (56.005 / 55.880)	(Germany) Julia Taubitz	1:51.972 (56.036 / 55.936)	(Italy) Verena Hofer	1:52.250 (56.180 / 56.070)	
10	10–11 January 2026	(Germany) Winterberg II (5)	Doubles	Germany; Jessica Degenhardt; Cheyenne Rosenthal	1:26.710 (43.321 / 43.389)	Austria; Selina Egle; Lara Kipp	1:26.810 (43.394 / 43.416)	Germany; Dajana Eitberger; Magdalena Matschina	1:27.079 (43.442 / 43.663)	
57th FIL European Championships 2026 (17–18 January)
11	17–18 January 2026	(Germany) Oberhof I (6)	Singles	(Germany) Merle Fräbel	1:22.867 (41.403 / 41.464)	(Austria) Lisa Schulte	1:23.146 (41.600 / 41.546)	(Switzerland) Natalie Maag	1:23.148 (41.550 / 41.598)	
12	17–18 January 2026	(Germany) Oberhof I (6)	Doubles	Germany; Jessica Degenhardt; Cheyenne Rosenthal	1:23.956 (42.004 / 41.952)	Austria; Selina Egle; Lara Kipp	1:24.137 (42.153 / 41.984)	Germany; Dajana Eitberger; Magdalena Matschina	1:24.288 (42.179 / 42.109)	
13	23–24 January 2026	(Germany) Oberhof II (7)	Singles	(Germany) Merle Fräbel	1:23.330 (41.752 / 41.578)	(Austria) Lisa Schulte	1:23.435 (41.684 / 41.751)	(Germany) Julia Taubitz	1:23.467 (41.816 / 41.651)	
14	23–24 January 2026	(Germany) Oberhof II (7)	Doubles	Austria; Selina Egle; Lara Kipp	1:24.086 (42.012 / 42.074)	Germany; Elisa-Marie Storch; Pauline Patz	1:24.241 (42.110 / 42.131)	Italy; Andrea Vötter; Marion Oberhofer	1:24.250 (42.044 / 42.206)	
XXV Olympic Winter Games (7–12 February)
OLY	7–12 February 2026	(Italy) Cortina d'Ampezzo	Singles	(Germany) Julia Taubitz	3:30.625 (52.638 / 52.550 / 52.730 / 52.707)	(Latvia) Elīna Ieva Bota	3:31.543 (52.878 / 52.805 / 52.939 / 52.921)	(United States) Ashley Farquharson	3:31.582 (52.862 / 52.934 / 52.877 / 52.909)	
OLY	7–12 February 2026	(Italy) Cortina d'Ampezzo	Doubles	Italy; Andrea Vötter; Marion Oberhofer	1:46.284 (53.102 / 53.182)	Germany; Dajana Eitberger; Magdalena Matschina	1:46.404 (53.124 / 53.280)	Austria; Selina Egle; Lara Kipp	1:46.543 (53.193 / 53.350)	
15	28 February–1 March 2026	(Switzerland) St. Moritz (8)	Singles	(Germany) Julia Taubitz	1:48.144 (54.280 / 53.864)	(Germany) Merle Fräbel	1:48.265 (54.073 / 54.192)	(Italy) Verena Hofer	1:48.369 (54.191 / 54.178)	
16	28 February–1 March 2026	(Switzerland) St. Moritz (8)	Doubles	Italy; Andrea Vötter; Marion Oberhofer	1:48.506 (54.175 / 54.331)	Germany; Elisa-Marie Storch; Pauline Patz	1:49.101 (54.532 / 54.569)	Latvia; Anda Upīte; Madara Pavlova	1:49.111 (54.544 / 54.567)	
17	7–8 March 2026	(Germany) Altenberg (9)	Singles	(Germany) Merle Fräbel	1:43.790 (52.036 / 51.754)	(Germany) Julia Taubitz	1:43.927 (52.069 / 51.858)	(Latvia) Kendija Aparjode	1:43.933 (52.034 / 51.899)	
18	7–8 March 2026	(Germany) Altenberg (9)	Doubles	Austria; Selina Egle; Lara Kipp	1:23.783 (41.939 / 41.844)	Germany; Dajana Eitberger; Magdalena Matschina	1:23.934 (42.048 / 41.886)	Latvia; Marta Robežniece; Kitija Bogdanova	1:24.065 (42.043 / 42.022)	

=== Standings ===
==== Singles ====
Rank	after all 9 events	Points
1	(Germany) Julia Taubitz	634
2	(Germany) Merle Fräbel	630
3	(Austria) Lisa Schulte	558
4	(United States) Summer Britcher	482
5	(Germany) Anna Berreiter	437
6	(Austria) Hannah Prock	419
7	(Switzerland) Natalie Maag	410
8	(Austria) Dorothea Schwarz	391
9	(Italy) Verena Hofer	373
10	(Latvia) Kendija Aparjode	316

==== Doubles ====
Rank	after all 9 events	Points
1	(Austria) Selina Egle / Lara Kipp	795
2	(Germany) Dajana Eitberger / Magdalena Matschina	653
3	(Germany) Jessica Degenhardt / Cheyenne Rosenthal	524
4	(Germany) Elise-Marie Storch / Pauline Patz	450
5	(Latvia) Anda Upīte / Madara Pavlova	434
6	(Italy) Andrea Vötter / Marion Oberhofer	426
7	(Latvia) Marta Robežniece / Kitija Bogdanova	396
8	(Poland) Nikola Domowicz / Dominika Piwkowska	354
9	(United States) Chevonne Forgan / Sophia Kirkby	350
10	(Ukraine) Olena Stetskiv / Oleksandra Mokh	337

== Mixed ==
=== Calendar ===
No.	Date	Place (In brackets Stage)	Discipline	Winner	Time	Second	Time	Third	Time	R.
1	5 December 2025	(Germany) Winterberg I (1)	Singles MX	Austria; Jonas Müller; Lisa Schulte	1:41.510	Germany; Felix Loch; Julia Taubitz	1:41.633	Austria; Wolfgang Kindl; Hannah Prock	1:42.038	
2	5 December 2025	(Germany) Winterberg I (1)	Doubles MX	Germany; Tobias Wendl; Tobias Arlt; Jessica Degenhardt; Cheyenne Rosenthal	1:34.470	Austria; Thomas Steu; Wolfgang Kindl; Selina Egle; Lara Kipp	1:34.541	Latvia; Mārtiņš Bots; Roberts Plūme; Anda Upīte; Madara Pavlova	1:35.078	
3	20 December 2025	(United States) Lake Placid (3)	Singles MX	Germany; Max Langenhan; Merle Fräbel	1:47.611	Germany; Felix Loch; Julia Taubitz	1:47.745	Austria; Jonas Müller; Dorothea Schwarz	1:47.987	
1st FIL Mixed European Championships 2026 (24 January)
4	24 January 2026	(Germany) Oberhof II (7)	Singles MX	Germany; Max Langenhan; Julia Taubitz	1:34.206	Germany; Felix Loch; Merle Fräbel	1:34.269	Austria; Jonas Müller; Lisa Schulte	1:34.559	
5	24 January 2026	(Germany) Oberhof II (7)	Doubles MX	Austria; Thomas Steu; Wolfgang Kindl; Selina Egle; Lara Kipp	1:34.156	Germany; Toni Eggert; Florian Müller; Jessica Degenhardt; Cheyenne Rosenthal	1:34.330	Latvia; Mārtiņš Bots; Roberts Plūme; Marta Robežniece; Kitija Bogdanova	1:34.373	

=== Standings ===
==== Singles Mixed ====
Rank	after all 3 events	Points
1	Germany 2	260
2	Germany 1	255
3	Austria 2	225
4	Austria 1	195
5	Latvia 1	157

==== Doubles Mixed ====
Rank	after all 2 events	Points
1	Germany 2	185
2	Austria 1	160
3	Latvia 2	116
3	Latvia 1	116
5	Italy	110

== Team Relay ==
No.	Date	Place (In brackets Stage)	Winner	Time	Second	Time	Third	Time	R.
1	7 December 2025	(Germany) Winterberg I (1)	Germany	3:13.155	Austria	3:13.784	Latvia	3:14.796	
2	13 December 2025	(United States) Park City (2)	Italy	3:05.885	Austria	3:06.092	United States	3:06.451	
3	4 January 2026	(Latvia) Sigulda (4)	Austria	3:01.215	Latvia	3:01.510	United States	3:01.643	
4	11 January 2026	(Germany) Winterberg II (5)	Germany	3:12.106	Austria	3:12.729	Italy	3:12.834	
5	18 January 2026	(Germany) Oberhof I (6) (Note: also as European Championships)	Germany	3:10.452	Austria	3:10.599	Latvia	3:11.362	
OLY	12 February 2026	(Italy) Cortina d'Ampezzo	Germany	3:41.672	Austria	3:42.214	Italy	3:42.521	
6	8 March 2026	(Germany) Altenberg (9)	Austria	3:11.454	Italy	3:11.672	Latvia	3:12.685	

=== Rankings ===
Rank	after all 6 events	Points
1	Austria	540
2	Latvia	410
3	Germany	355
4	Poland	321
5	Ukraine	316

== Podium table by nation ==
Table showing the World Cup podium places (gold–1st place, silver–2nd place, bronze–3rd place) by the countries represented by the athletes.

Rank	Nation	Gold	Silver	Bronze	Total
1	Germany	25	21	12	58
2	Austria	16	18	13	47
3	United States	3	2	5	10
4	Italy	2	4	7	13
5	Latvia	1	2	9	12
6	Switzerland	0	0	1	1
Totals (6 entries)		47	47	47	141

== Points distribution ==
The table shows the number of points won in the 2025–26 Luge World Cup for men and women.

Place	1	2	3	4	5	6	7	8	9	10	11	12	13	14	15	16	17	18	19	20
Singles, Doubles & Relay	100	85	70	60	55	50	46	42	39	36	34	32	30	28	26	25	24	23	22	21
