= 2025 FIL World Luge Championships – Mixed doubles =

Mixed doubles at the 2025 FIL World Luge Championships
- Venue: Whistler Sliding Centre
- Location: Whistler, British Columbia, Canada
- Dates: 6 February
- Competitors: 48 from 9 nations
- Teams: 12
- Winning time: 1:22.894

Medalists
gold medal	Thomas Steu; Wolfgang Kindl; Selina Egle; Lara Kipp	Austria
silver medal	Hannes Orlamünder; Paul Gubitz; Dajana Eitberger; Magdalena Matschina	Germany
bronze medal	Tobias Wendl; Tobias Arlt; Jessica Degenhardt; Cheyenne Rosenthal	Germany

The Mixed doubles competition at the 2025 FIL World Luge Championships was held on 6 February 2025.

== Results ==
The race was started at 10:30.

Rank	Bib	Name	Country	Time	Diff
1st place, gold medalist(s)	11	Thomas Steu / Wolfgang Kindl; Selina Egle / Lara Kipp	Austria	1:22.894	
2nd place, silver medalist(s)	12	Hannes Orlamünder / Paul Gubitz; Dajana Eitberger / Magdalena Matschina	Germany 1	1:22.912	+0.018
3rd place, bronze medalist(s)	9	Tobias Wendl / Tobias Arlt; Jessica Degenhardt / Cheyenne Rosenthal	Germany 2	1:22.991	+0.097
4	4	Zack DiGregorio / Sean Hollander; Chevonne Forgan / Sophia Kirkby	United States 2	1:23.059	+0.165
5	7	Ivan Nagler / Fabian Malleier; Andrea Vötter / Marion Oberhofer	Italy	1:23.127	+0.233
6	10	Mārtiņš Bots / Roberts Plūme; Marta Robežniece / Kitija Bogdanova	Latvia 1	1:23.196	+0.302
7	3	Eduards Ševics-Mikeļševics / Lūkass Krasts; Anda Upīte / Zane Kaluma	Latvia 2	1:23.544	+0.650
8	1	Devin Wardrope / Cole Zajanski; Beattie Podulsky / Kailey Allan	Canada	1:23.923	+1.029
9	6	Wojciech Chmielewski / Jakub Kowalewski; Nikola Domowicz / Dominika Piwkowska	Poland	1:24.422	+1.528
10	5	Ihor Hoi / Nazarii Kachmar; Olena Stetskiv / Oleksandra Mokh	Ukraine	1:24.878	+1.984
11	2	Vasile Gîtlan / Darius Șerban; Raluca Strămăturaru / Carmen Manolescu	Romania	1:25.028	+2.134
12	8	Marcus Mueller / Ansel Haugsjaa; Maya Chan / Sophia Gordon	United States 1	1:25.107	+2.213
