= 2024 FIL World Luge Championships – Women's doubles =

Women's doubles at the 2024 FIL World Luge Championships
- Venue: Altenberg bobsleigh, luge, and skeleton track
- Location: Altenberg, Germany
- Dates: 27 January
- Competitors: 32 from 10 nations
- Teams: 16
- Winning time: 1:24.761

Medalists
gold medal	Selina Egle; Lara Kipp	Austria
silver medal	Anda Upīte; Zane Kaluma	Latvia
bronze medal	Chevonne Forgan; Sophia Kirkby	United States

The Women's doubles competition at the 2024 FIL World Luge Championships was held on 27 January 2024.

== Results ==
The race was started at 08:53.

Rank	Bib	Name	Country	Run 1	Rank	Run 2	Rank	Total	Diff
1st place, gold medalist(s)	14	Selina Egle; Lara Kipp	Austria	42.364	2	42.397	2	1:24.761	
2nd place, silver medalist(s)	7	Anda Upīte; Zane Kaluma	Latvia	42.334	1	42.477	3	1:24.811	+0.050
3rd place, bronze medalist(s)	13	Chevonne Forgan; Sophia Kirkby	United States	42.563	6	42.334	1	1:24.897	+0.136
4	10	Andrea Vötter; Marion Oberhofer	Italy	42.480	3	42.502	4	1:24.962	+0.221
5	15	Maya Chan; Reannyn Weiler	United States	42.529	5	42.629	5	1:25.158	+0.397
6	12	Dajana Eitberger; Saskia Schirmer	Germany	42.506	4	43.098	7	1:25.604	+0.843
7	8	Raluca Strămăturaru; Carmen Manolescu	Romania	43.125	12	42.950	6	1:26.075	+1.314
8	2	Anna Čežíková; Lucie Jansová	Czech Republic	43.095	11	43.127	8	1:26.222	+1.461
9	16	Adikeyoumu Gulijienaiti; Zhao Jiaying	China	43.037	10	43.213	9	1:26.250	+1.489
10	4	Viktorija Ziediņa; Selīna Zvilna	Latvia	42.887	8	44.035	11	1:26.922	+2.161
11	6	Nikola Domowicz; Dominika Piwkowska	Poland	43.916	14	43.626	10	1:27.542	+2.781
12	1	Elisa-Marie Storch; Pauline Patz	Germany	42.987	9	45.303	12	1:28.290	+3.529
13	11	Jessica Degenhardt; Cheyenne Rosenthal	Germany	42.581	7	46.259	13	1:28.840	+4.079
14	3	Natasha Khytrenko; Viktoriia Koval	Ukraine	43.774	13	46.344	14	1:30.118	+5.357
15	9	Olena Stetskiv; Oleksandra Mokh	Ukraine	44.097	15	50.919	15	1:35.016	+10.255
–	5	Marta Robežniece; Kitija Bogdanova	Latvia	Did not finish					
