= 2024–25 Luge World Cup =

Luge championship season

Discipline	Men	Women
Singles	(Germany) Max Langenhan (2)	(Germany) Julia Taubitz (5)
Doubles	(Germany) Tobias Wendl / Tobias Arlt (6)	(Austria) Selina Egle / Lara Kipp (1)
- Team Relay: Austria (1)

Competition
Edition	48th	48th
Locations	9	9

The 2024–25 FIL Luge World Cup (official: Eberspächer Luge World Cup), was the 48th World Cup season for men and women as the highest level of international luge competitions.

The season started on 30 November 2024 in Lillehammer, Norway, and concluded on 23 February 2025 in Yanqing, China.

The season featured a break in February for the FIL World Luge Championships in Whistler, Canada, whose results are not included in the World Cup standings.

== Season overview ==
In the 2024/25 season, the Sprint World Cup will no longer be held. At the FIL 2024 Congress, the world association decided to introduce new mixed competitions instead, which may be held in teams, in both singles and doubles disciplines. For the first time, mixed teams from two nations are also allowed to take part if they cannot field their own mixed team. This new format will premiere with the start of the World Cup in Lillehammer, and later in Oberhof (originally scheduled for Altenberg) and Pyeongchang.

A total of nine World Cup weekends are planned on eight routes in six countries.

== Map of world cup hosts ==
The following list contains all 9 World Cup hosts of the season (including Whistler – venue of the World Championships).

Europe
Asia	North America

== Men ==
=== Calendar ===
No.	Date	Place (In brackets Stage)	Discipline	Winner	Time	Second	Time	Third	Time	R.
1	30 November– 1 December 2024	(Norway) Lillehammer (1)	Singles	(Germany) Max Langenhan	1:37.338 (48.826 / 48.512)	(Austria) Wolfgang Kindl	1:37.365 (48.963 / 48.402)	(Germany) Felix Loch	1:37.522 (49.151 / 48.371)	
2	30 November– 1 December 2024	(Norway) Lillehammer (1)	Doubles	Germany; Toni Eggert; Florian Müller	1:34.929 (46.807 / 47.039)	Latvia; Mārtiņš Bots; Roberts Plūme	1:33.978 (46.932 / 47.046)	Austria; Thomas Steu; Wolfgang Kindl	1:34.070 (47.060 / 47.010)	
3	7–8 December 2024	(Austria) Innsbruck-Igls (2)	Singles	(Austria) Nico Gleirscher	1:39.713 (49.615 / 50.098)	(Austria) Jonas Müller	1:39.808 (49.595 / 50.213)	(Austria) David Gleirscher	1:40.166 (49.715 / 50.451)	
4	7–8 December 2024	(Austria) Innsbruck-Igls (2)	Doubles	Latvia; Mārtiņš Bots; Roberts Plūme	1:32.393 (46.151 / 46.242)	Germany; Toni Eggert; Florian Müller	1:32.572 (46.227 / 46.345)	Austria; Thomas Steu; Wolfgang Kindl	1:32.682 (46.228 / 46.454)	
5	14–15 December 2024	(Germany) Oberhof I (3)	Singles	(Austria) Jonas Müller	1:25.321 (42.636 / 42.685)	(Austria) Nico Gleirscher	1:25.566 (42.726 / 42.830)	(Austria) David Gleirscher	1:25.836 (42.951 / 42.885)	
6	14–15 December 2024	(Germany) Oberhof I (3)	Doubles	Germany; Hannes Orlamünder; Paul Gubitz	1:23.275 (41.655 / 41.620)	Germany; Tobias Wendl; Tobias Arlt	1:23.391 (41.669 / 41.722)	Austria; Thomas Steu; Wolfgang Kindl	1:23.483 (41.730 / 41.753)	
7	4–5 January 2025	(Latvia) Sigulda (4)	Singles	(Austria) Nico Gleirscher	1:35.199 (47.539 / 47.660)	(Latvia) Kristers Aparjods	1:35.383 (47.627 / 47.756)	(Germany) Max Langenhan	1:35.480 (47.733 / 47.747)	
8	4–5 January 2025	(Latvia) Sigulda (4)	Doubles	Germany; Tobias Wendl; Tobias Arlt	1:23.045 (41.652 / 41.393)	Latvia; Mārtiņš Bots; Roberts Plūme	1:23.146 (41.728 / 41.418)	Austria; Yannick Müller; Armin Frauscher	1:23.337 (41.681 / 41.656)	
9	11–12 January 2025	(Germany) Altenberg (5)	Singles	(Germany) Max Langenhan	1:48.210 (54.166 / 54.044)	(Germany) Felix Loch	1:48.440 (54.338 / 54.102)	(Italy) Dominik Fischnaller	1:48.609 (54.438 / 54.171)	
10	11–12 January 2025	(Germany) Altenberg (5)	Doubles	Latvia; Mārtiņš Bots; Roberts Plūme	1:23.900 (41.879 / 42.021)	Germany; Tobias Wendl; Tobias Arlt	1:24.023 (41.983 / 42.040)	Austria; Yannick Müller; Armin Frauscher	1:24.031 (41.929 / 42.102)	
56th FIL European Championships 2025 (18–19 January)
11	18–19 January 2025	(Germany) Winterberg (6)	Singles	(Austria) Jonas Müller	1:41.742 (50.722 / 51.020)	(Germany) Max Langenhan	1:41.797 (50.831 / 50.966)	(Austria) Nico Gleirscher	1:41.843 (50.822 / 51.021)	
12	18–19 January 2025	(Germany) Winterberg (6)	Doubles	Germany; Tobias Wendl; Tobias Arlt	1:25.152 (42.606 / 42.546)	Austria; Juri Gatt; Riccardo Schöpf	1:25.286 (42.608 / 42.678)	Austria; Yannick Müller; Armin Frauscher	1:25.354 (42.613 / 42.741)	
13	25–26 January 2025	(Germany) Oberhof II (7)	Singles	(Germany) Max Langenhan	1:25.895 (42.828 / 43.067)	(Germany) Felix Loch	1:26.134 (43.007 / 43.127)	(Austria) Wolfgang Kindl	1:26.257 (43.071 / 43.186)	
14	25–26 January 2025	(Germany) Oberhof II (7)	Doubles	Germany; Tobias Wendl; Tobias Arlt	1:22.808 (41.276 / 41.532)	Germany; Hannes Orlamünder; Paul Gubitz	1:22.876 (41.388 / 41.488)	Austria; Thomas Steu; Wolfgang Kindl	1:23.046 (41.444 / 41.602)	
53rd FIL World Luge Championships 2024 (6–8 February) (Note: not included in the World Cup)
WCH	6–8 February 2025	(Canada) Whistler	Singles	(Germany) Max Langenhan	1:39.922	(Germany) Felix Loch	1:40.057	(Austria) Nico Gleirscher	1:40.144	
WCH	6–8 February 2025	(Canada) Whistler	Doubles	Germany; Hannes Orlamünder; Paul Gubitz	1:16.538	Latvia; Mārtiņš Bots; Roberts Plūme	1:16.640	Germany; Tobias Wendl; Tobias Arlt	1:16.671	
15	15–16 February 2025	(South Korea) Pyeongchang (8)	Singles	(Austria) Wolfgang Kindl	1:35.422 (47.650 / 47.772)	(Italy) Dominik Fischnaller	1:35.514 (47.679 / 47.835)	(Latvia) Kristers Aparjods	1:35.533 (47.819 / 47.714)	
16	15–16 February 2025	(South Korea) Pyeongchang (8)	Doubles	Austria; Thomas Steu; Wolfgang Kindl	1:32.578 (46.380 / 46.198)	Germany; Toni Eggert; Florian Müller	1:32.580 (46.238 / 46.342)	Germany; Tobias Wendl; Tobias Arlt	1:32.680 (46.336 / 46.344)	
17	22–23 February 2025	(China) Yanqing (9)	Singles	(Germany) Max Langenhan	1:55.051 (57.532 / 57.519)	(Austria) Jonas Müller	1:55.583 (57.593 / 57.990)	(Austria) David Gleirscher	1:55.633 (57.838 / 57.795)	
18	22–23 February 2025	(China) Yanqing (9)	Doubles	Germany; Tobias Wendl; Tobias Arlt	1:58.143 (59.211 / 58.932)	Latvia; Mārtiņš Bots; Roberts Plūme	1:58.301 (59.155 / 59.146)	Germany; Toni Eggert; Florian Müller	1:58.908 (59.765 / 59.143)	

=== Standings ===
==== Singles ====
Rank	after all 9 events	Points
1	(Germany) Max Langenhan	716
2	(Austria) Nico Gleirscher	613
3	(Germany) Felix Loch	547
4	(Austria) Jonas Müller	545
5	(Austria) Wolfgang Kindl	523
6	(Italy) Dominik Fischnaller	506
7	(Latvia) Kristers Aparjods	477
8	(Austria) David Gleirscher	472
9	(Germany) Timon Grancagnolo	338
10	(Latvia) Gints Berzins	295

==== Doubles ====
Rank	after all 9 events	Points
1	(Germany) Tobias Wendl / Tobias Arlt	745
2	(Latvia) Mārtiņš Bots / Roberts Plūme	641
3	(Austria) Thomas Steu / Wolfgang Kindl	615
4	(Germany) Toni Eggert / Florian Müller	606
5	(Germany) Hannes Orlamünder / Paul Gubitz	495
6	(Austria) Yannick Müller / Armin Frauscher	454
7	(Austria) Juri Gatt / Riccardo Schöpf	369
8	(Italy) Emanuel Rieder / Simon Kainzwaldner	347
9	(United States) Zachary Di Gregorio / Sean Hollander	341
10	(Italy) Ivan Nagler / Fabian Malleier	339

== Women ==
=== Calendar ===
No.	Date	Place (In brackets Stage)	Discipline	Winner	Time	Second	Time	Third	Time	R.
1	30 November– 1 December 2024	(Norway) Lillehammer (1)	Singles	(Germany) Julia Taubitz	1:33.898 (46.935 / 46.963)	(United States) Emily Sweeney	1:33.990 (47.123 / 46.867)	(Austria) Lisa Schulte	1:34.050 (47.016 / 47.034)	
2	30 November– 1 December 2024	(Norway) Lillehammer (1)	Doubles	United States; Chevonne Forgan; Sophia Kirkby	1:34.929 (47.406 / 47.523)	Germany; Jessica Degenhardt; Cheyenne Rosenthal	1:34.946 (47.445 / 47.501)	Latvia; Marta Robežniece; Kitija Bogdanova	1:35.419 (47.687 / 47.732)	
3	7–8 December 2024	(Austria) Innsbruck-Igls (2)	Singles	(Austria) Madeleine Egle	1:32.484 (46.161 / 46.323)	(Germany) Julia Taubitz	1:32.724 (46.370 / 46.354)	(Austria) Lisa Schulte	1:32.853 (46.431 / 46.422)	
4	7–8 December 2024	(Austria) Innsbruck-Igls (2)	Doubles	Austria; Selina Egle; Lara Kipp	1:33.499 (46.763 / 46.736)	Germany; Jessica Degenhardt; Cheyenne Rosenthal	1:33.850 (47.015 / 46.835)	Latvia; Anda Upīte; Zane Kaluma	1:34.109 (47.121 / 46.988)	
5	14–15 December 2024	(Germany) Oberhof I (3)	Singles	(Austria) Madeleine Egle	1:24.019 (42.021 / 41.998)	(Austria) Lisa Schulte	1:24.175 (42.115 / 42.060)	(Germany) Julia Taubitz	1:24.194 (42.103 / 42.091)	
6	14–15 December 2024	(Germany) Oberhof I (3)	Doubles	Austria; Selina Egle; Lara Kipp	1:24.844 (42.382 / 42.462)	Germany; Jessica Degenhardt; Cheyenne Rosenthal	1:25.105 (42.486 / 42.619)	United States; Chevonne Forgan; Sophia Kirkby	1:25.576 (42.794 / 42.782)	
7	4–5 January 2025	(Latvia) Sigulda (4)	Singles	(Latvia) Elīna Ieva Bota	1:23.280 (41.534 / 41.746)	(Germany) Merle Fräbel	1:23.344 (41.684 / 41.660)	(Austria) Lisa Schulte	1:23.345 (41.616 / 41.729)	
8	4–5 January 2025	(Latvia) Sigulda (4)	Doubles	Austria; Selina Egle; Lara Kipp	1:24.483 (42.297 / 42.186)	United States; Chevonne Forgan; Sophia Kirkby	1:24.599 (42.493 / 42.106)	Latvia; Marta Robežniece; Kitija Bogdanova	1:24.894 (42.408 / 42.486)	
9	11–12 January 2025	(Germany) Altenberg (5)	Singles	(Austria) Madeleine Egle	1:45.642 (52.868 / 52.774)	(Germany) Anna Berreiter	1:45.792 (52.938 / 52.854)	(Germany) Merle Fräbel	1:45.905 (53.085 / 52.820)	
10	11–12 January 2025	(Germany) Altenberg (5)	Doubles	Austria; Selina Egle; Lara Kipp	1:25.077 (42.478 / 42.599)	Germany; Jessica Degenhardt; Cheyenne Rosenthal	1:25.474 (42.786 / 42.688)	United States; Chevonne Forgan; Sophia Kirkby	1:25.633 (42.773 / 42.860)	
56th FIL European Championships 2025 (18–19 January)
11	18–19 January 2025	(Germany) Winterberg (6)	Singles	(Germany) Julia Taubitz	1:49.582 (54.806 / 54.776)	(Austria) Madeleine Egle	1:49.780 (54.823 / 54.957)	(United States) Emily Sweeney	1:49.922 (55.006 / 54.916)	
12	18–19 January 2025	(Germany) Winterberg (6)	Doubles	Austria; Selina Egle; Lara Kipp	1:26.467 (43.260 / 43.207)	Germany; Jessica Degenhardt; Cheyenne Rosenthal	1:26.481 (43.330 / 43.151)	Italy; Andrea Vötter; Marion Oberhofer	1:26.688 (43.371 / 43.317)	
13	25–26 January 2025	(Germany) Oberhof II (7)	Singles	(Austria) Madeleine Egle	1:23.117 (41.505 / 41.617)	(Germany) Julia Taubitz	1:23.230 (41.694 / 41.536)	(Switzerland) Natalie Maag	1:23.360 (41.655 / 41.705)	
14	25–26 January 2025	(Germany) Oberhof II (7)	Doubles	Austria; Selina Egle; Lara Kipp	1:24.135 (42.060 / 42.075)	Germany; Jessica Degenhardt; Cheyenne Rosenthal	1:24.235 (42.117 / 42.118)	Germany; Dajana Eitberger; Magdalena Matschina	1:24.613 (42.350 / 42.263)	
53rd FIL World Luge Championships 2024 (6–8 February)
WCH	6–8 February 2025	(Canada) Whistler	Singles	(Germany) Julia Taubitz	1:17.206	(Germany) Merle Fräbel	1:17.247	(United States) Emily Sweeney	1:17.249	
WCH	6–8 February 2025	(Canada) Whistler	Doubles	Austria; Selina Egle; Lara Kipp	1:17.724	Germany; Dajana Eitberger; Magdalena Matschina	1:17.753	Germany; Jessica Degenhardt; Cheyenne Rosenthal	1:17.784	
15	15–16 February 2025	(South Korea) Pyeongchang (8)	Singles	(Austria) Lisa Schulte	1:32.923 (46.481 / 46.442)	(Germany) Merle Fräbel	1:33.296 (46.571 / 46.725)	(Austria) Hannah Prock	1:33.000 (46.496 / 46.804)	
16	15–16 February 2025	(South Korea) Pyeongchang (8)	Doubles	Germany; Jessica Degenhardt; Cheyenne Rosenthal	1:33.618 (46.834 / 46.784)	Austria; Selina Egle; Lara Kipp	1:33.641 (46.790 / 46.851)	Germany; Dajana Eitberger; Magdalena Matschina	1:34.013 (47.015 / 46.998)	
17	22–23 February 2025	(China) Yanqing (9)	Singles	(Germany) Julia Taubitz	1:58.926 (59.506 / 59.420)	(Switzerland) Natalie Maag	1:59.369 (59.706 / 59.663)	(Germany) Merle Fräbel	1:59.403 (59.672 / 59.731)	
18	22–23 February 2025	(China) Yanqing (9)	Doubles	Austria; Selina Egle; Lara Kipp	1:59.896 (1:00.055 / 59.841)	Germany; Jessica Degenhardt; Cheyenne Rosenthal	2:01.721 (1:00.389 / 1:01.332)	Latvia; Anda Upīte; Zane Kaluma	2:01.862 (1:00.905 / 1:00.957)	

=== Standings ===
==== Singles ====
Rank	after all 9 events	Points
1	(Germany) Julia Taubitz	657
2	(Austria) Madeleine Egle	629
3	(Austria) Lisa Schulte	620
4	(Germany) Merle Fräbel	582
5	(Switzerland) Natalie Maag	454
6	(Germany) Anna Berreiter	426
7	(United States) Ashley Farquharson	400
8	(Latvia) Kendija Aparjode	375
9	(Austria) Barbara Allmaier	365
10	(Latvia) Elīna Ieva Bota	302

==== Doubles ====
Rank	after all 9 events	Points
1	(Austria) Selina Egle / Lara Kipp	835
2	(Germany) Jessica Degenhardt / Cheyenne Rosenthal	745
3	(United States) Chevonne Forgan / Sophia Kirkby	601
4	(Latvia) Anda Upīte / Zane Kaluma	503
5	(Italy) Andrea Vötter / Marion Oberhofer	500
6	(Latvia) Marta Robežniece / Kitija Bogdanova	429
7	(Germany) Dajana Eitberger / Magdalena Matschina	378
8	(Ukraine) Olena Stetskiv / Oleksandra Mokh	346
9	(Romania) Raluca Stramaturaru / Mihaela-Carmen Manolescu	293
10	(Poland) Nikola Domowicz / Dominika Piwkowska	246

== Mixed ==
=== Calendar ===
No.	Date	Place (In brackets Stage)	Discipline	Winner	Time	Second	Time	Third	Time	R.
1	30 November– 1 December 2024	(Norway) Lillehammer (1)	Singles MX	Germany; Max Langenhan; Julia Taubitz	1:45.429 (52.051 / 53.378)	United States; Jonathan Eric Gustafson; Emily Sweeney	1:45.692 (52.511 / 53.181)	Germany; Felix Loch; Merle Fräbel	1:45.741 (52.167 / 53.574)	
2	30 November– 1 December 2024	(Norway) Lillehammer (1)	Doubles MX	Germany; Tobias Wendl; Tobias Arlt; Dajana Eitberger; Magdalena Matschina	1:44.148 (50.693 / 53.545)	Latvia; Mārtiņš Bots; Roberts Plūme; Marta Robežniece; Kitija Bogdanova	1:44.604 (50.714 / 53.890)	United States; Marcus Mueller; Ansel Haugsjaa; Chevonne Forgan; Sophia Kirkby	1:44.684 (50.794 / 53.890)	
3	25–26 January 2025	(Germany) Oberhof II (7)	Singles MX	Germany; Felix Loch; Merle Fräbel	1:36.948 (47.722 / 49.226)	Germany; Max Langenhan; Julia Taubitz	1:37.130 (47.763 / 49.367)	Austria; Nico Gleirscher; Lisa Schulte	1:37.408 (47.991 / 49.417)	
4	25–26 January 2025	(Germany) Oberhof II (7)	Doubles MX	Germany; Tobias Wendl; Tobias Arlt; Jessica Degenhardt; Cheyenne Rosenthal	1:36.365 (46.592 / 49.773)	Austria; Thomas Steu; Wolfgang Kindl; Selina Egle; Lara Kipp	1:36.547 (46.949 / 49.598)	Italy; Ivan Nagler; Fabian Malleier; Andrea Vötter; Marion Oberhofer	1:36.705 (46.865 / 49.840)	
53rd FIL World Luge Championships 2024 (6–8 February)
WCH	6–8 February 2025	(Canada) Whistler	Singles MX	Germany; Max Langenhan; Julia Taubitz	1:22.354	United States; Jonathan Eric Gustafson; Emily Sweeney	1:22.449	Austria; David Gleirscher; Madeleine Egle	1:22.678	
WCH	6–8 February 2025	(Canada) Whistler	Doubles MX	Austria; Thomas Steu; Wolfgang Kindl; Selina Egle; Lara Kipp	1:22.894	Germany; Hannes Orlamünder; Paul Gubitz; Dajana Eitberger; Magdalena Matschina	1:22.912	Germany; Tobias Wendl; Tobias Arlt; Jessica Degenhardt; Cheyenne Rosenthal	1:22.991	
5	15–16 February 2025	(South Korea) Pyeongchang (8)	Singles MX	Germany; Toni Eggert; Florian Müller; Jessica Degenhardt; Cheyenne Rosenthal	1:37.835	Austria; Thomas Steu; Wolfgang Kindl; Selina Egle; Lara Kipp	1:38.037	Germany; Tobias Wendl; Tobias Arlt; Dajana Eitberger; Magdalena Matschina	1:38.162	
6	15–16 February 2025	(South Korea) Pyeongchang (8)	Doubles MX	Austria; Wolfgang Kindl; Lisa Schulte	1:38.613	Germany; Max Langenhan; Merle Fräbel	1:38.635	Germany; Felix Loch; Julia Taubitz	1:38.887	

=== Standings ===
==== Singles Mixed ====
Rank	after all 3 events	Points
1	Germany 1	270
2	Germany 2	240
3	Austria 2	216
4	United States 1	169
5	Austria 1	165

==== Doubles Mixed ====
Rank	after all 3 events	Points
1	Germany 1	246
2	Germany 2	230
3	Austria	212
4	Latvia 1	184
5	Italy 1	175

== Team Relay ==
No.	Date	Place (In brackets Stage)	Winner	Time	Second	Time	Third	Time	R.
	8 December 2024	(Austria) Innsbruck-Igls (2)	cancelled due to technical problems						
1	15 December 2024	(Germany) Oberhof I (3)	Austria	3:12.865	Germany	3:13.281	Italy	3:14.239	
2	5 January 2025	(Latvia) Sigulda (4)	Germany	3:00.723	Austria	3:00.763	Ukraine	3:04.670	
3	12 January 2025	(Germany) Altenberg (5)	Latvia	3:15.715	Germany	3:15.914	United States	3:16.149	
4	19 January 2025	(Germany) Winterberg (6) (Note: also as European Championships)	Austria	3:11.428	Germany	3:11.519	Italy	3:12.008	
WCH	8 February 2025	(Canada) Whistler	Germany	2:50.361	Austria	2:50.492	Canada	2:51.641	
5	23 February 2025	(China) Yanqing (9)	Austria	4:11.933	Germany	4:12.098	United States	4:13.535	

=== Rankings ===
Rank	after 5 of 5 events	Points
1	Austria	445
2	Germany	440
3	Latvia	275
4	United States	255
5	Italy	250
6	Ukraine	246
7	Romania	177
8	Canada	96
9	Poland	89
10	China	50

== Podium table by nation ==
Table showing the World Cup podium places (gold–1st place, silver–2nd place, bronze–3rd place) by the countries represented by the athletes.

Rank	Nation	Gold	Silver	Bronze	Total
1	Germany	21	26	12	59
2	Austria	21	11	17	49
3	Latvia	4	5	5	14
4	United States	1	3	6	10
5	Italy	0	1	5	6
6	Switzerland	0	1	1	2
7	Ukraine	0	0	1	1
Totals (7 entries)		47	47	47	141

== Points distribution ==
The table shows the number of points won in the 2024–25 Luge World Cup for men and women.

Place	1	2	3	4	5	6	7	8	9	10	11	12	13	14	15	16	17	18	19	20
Singles, Doubles & Relay	100	85	70	60	55	50	46	42	39	36	34	32	30	28	26	25	24	23	22	21
