= Oleksandra Mokh =

Ukrainian luger (born 2004)

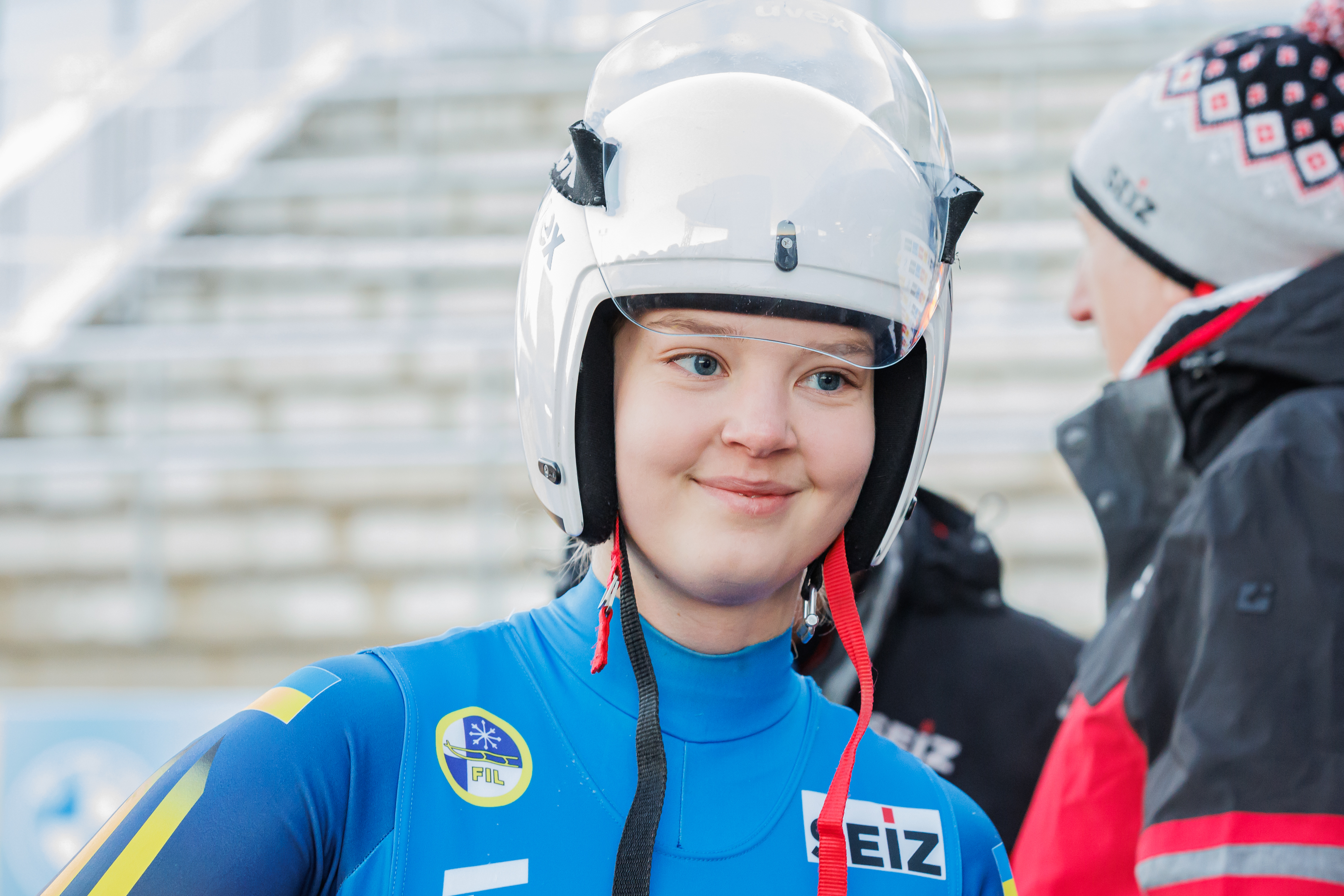
- Mokh in 2024

Personal information
- Nationality: Ukrainian
- Born: 27 February 2004 (age 22) Lviv, Lviv Oblast, Ukraine

Sport
- Country: Ukraine
- Sport: Luge
- Event: Women's doubles

Oleksandra Mokh (Ukrainian: Олександра Мох, born 27 February 2004) is a Ukrainian luger. She participated at the 2026 Winter Olympics.

== Career ==
Mokh competed at the 2020 Winter Youth Olympics in St. Moritz, Switzerland, where she was 10th in the doubles competition together with Nadiia Antoniuk.

In December 2022, she debuted in World Cup competitions. Mokh's partner since her World Cup debut was Olena Stetskiv. As of December 2025, Mokh's best Luge World Cup doubles finish was 7th four times each year between 2022 and 2025, all of which were achieved in Sigulda, Latvia, while her best sprint result was 6th in Sigulda in the season 2023–24.

On January 5, 2025, Mokh finished third in the mixed relay event in Sigulda. The team also included Mandziy, Tunytska, Hoy, Kachmar, and Stetskiv. This marked the first ever medal for Ukraine in the relay event.

Mokh qualified to compete at the 2026 Winter Olympics. Together with Stetskiv, she finished 7th in women's doubles.

== Personal life ==
Mokh studies at the Lviv State University of Physical Culture. She graduated from the Lviv Professional College of Sports.

== Career results ==
=== Winter Olympics ===
Year	Event	Doubles	Relay
2026	Cortina d'Ampezzo, Italy	7	6

=== World Championships ===
Year	Event	Doubles	Doubles Sprint	Relay	Mixed Doubles
2023	Oberhof, Germany	11	13	—N/a	—N/a
2024	Altenberg, Germany	15	12	8	—N/a
2025	Whistler, Canada	11	—N/a	6	10

=== European Championships ===
Year	Event	Doubles	Relay	Mixed Doubles
2023	Sigulda, Latvia	6	4	—N/a
2024	Innsbruck, Austria	11	5	—N/a
2025	Winterberg, Germany	8	6	—N/a
2026	Oberhof, Germany	9	5	8

=== Luge World Cup ===
==== Relay podiums ====
Season	Track	Competition	Placement
2024–25	Sigulda, Latvia	Mixed relay	3

==== Rankings ====
Season	Doubles	Doubles Sprint	Doubles Overall
2022–23	13	13	13
2023–24	7	5	6
2024–25	8	—N/a	
2025–26	10	—N/a	
