= Luge at the 2026 Winter Olympics – Team relay =

Luge team relay at the XXV Olympic Winter Games
- Luge pictogram
- Venue: Cortina Sliding Centre
- Date: 12 February 2026
- Competitors: 54 from 9 nations
- Winning time: 3:41.672

Medalists
1st place, gold medalist(s)		Julia Taubitz; Tobias Wendl; Tobias Arlt; Max Langenhan; Dajana Eitberger; Magdalena Matschina	Germany
2nd place, silver medalist(s)		Lisa Schulte; Thomas Steu; Wolfgang Kindl; Jonas Müller; Selina Egle; Lara Kipp	Austria
3rd place, bronze medalist(s)		Verena Hofer; Emanuel Rieder; Simon Kainzwaldner; Dominik Fischnaller; Andrea Vötter; Marion Oberhofer	Italy

The team relay competition in luge at the 2026 Winter Olympics was held on 12 February at the Cortina Sliding Centre in Cortina d'Ampezzo. Following the introduction of women's doubles to the Olympic program, the relay was expanded to four legs. Germany, represented by Julia Taubitz, Tobias Wendl / Tobias Arlt, Max Langenhan, and Dajana Eitberger / Magdalena Matschina, won the event. Austria were second and Italy third.

== Background ==
Germany are the defending Olympic champions, having won every event since its introduction in 2014. From their 2022 gold medal winning lineup only the doubles pair of Tobias Wendl and Tobias Arlt qualified, with both Natalie Geisenberger and Johannes Ludwig have retired from competitions. Austria won the silver medal; in 2026 only Wolfgang Kindl and Thomas Steu qualified as Madeleine Egle was serving at the time her 20 month suspension for an anti-doping rule violation for whereabouts failures, while Kindl replaced Lorenz Koller as Steu's partner in the men's doubles. Latvia were the bronze medalist with Kristers Aparjods and the doubles pair of Mārtiņš Bots and Roberts Plūme qualified for the event, while Elīza Tīruma retired from competitions. Germany were leading the standing at the 2025–26 Luge World Cup and are also the 2025 World champions ahead of Austria and Canada. Both of the two doubles pairs from the world title winning team (Hannes Orlamünder and Paul Gubitz for the men and Jessica Degenhardt and Cheyenne Rosenthal) had failed to qualify, while Canada will miss the event altogether as they did not have an athlete that qualified for the men's singles event.

== Qualification ==
=== Summary ===
Number of sleds	Athletes total	Nation

== Results ==
Rank	Bib	Country	Women's singles	Men's doubles	Men's singles	Women's doubles	Total	Behind
1st place, gold medalist(s)	9	Germany; Julia Taubitz; Tobias Wendl / Tobias Arlt; Max Langenhan; Dajana Eitberger / Magdalena Matschina	55.633	55.219	54.691	56.129	3:41.672	—
2nd place, silver medalist(s)	7	Austria; Lisa Schulte; Thomas Steu / Wolfgang Kindl; Jonas Müller; Selina Egle / Lara Kipp	55.959	55.370	54.727	56.158	3:42.214	+0.542
3rd place, bronze medalist(s)	8	Italy; Verena Hofer; Emanuel Rieder / Simon Kainzwaldner; Dominik Fischnaller; Andrea Vötter / Marion Oberhofer	55.830	55.332	55.088	56.271	3:42.521	+0.849
4	6	Latvia; Elīna Ieva Bota; Mārtiņš Bots / Roberts Plūme; Kristers Aparjods; Marta Robežniece / Kitija Bogdanova	55.684	55.800	54.989	56.276	3:42.749	+1.077
5	5	United States; Ashley Farquharson; Marcus Mueller / Ansel Haugsjaa; Jonathan Gustafson; Chevonne Forgan / Sophia Kirkby	55.771	55.281	55.197	56.527	3:42.776	+1.104
6	4	Ukraine; Yulianna Tunytska; Ihor Hoi / Nazarii Kachmar; Andriy Mandziy; Olena Stetskiv / Oleksandra Mokh	56.392	57.025	55.498	57.259	3:46.174	+4.502
7	2	China; Wang Peixuan; Jubayi Saikeyi / Hou Shuo; Bao Zhenyu; Gulijienaiti Adikeyoumu / Zhao Jiaying	56.760	56.368	56.364	57.350	3:46.842	+5.170
8	3	Poland; Klaudia Domaradzka; Wojciech Chmielewski / Michał Gancarczyk; Mateusz Sochowicz; Nikola Domowicz / Dominika Piwkowska	57.174	55.832	57.208	57.120	3:47.334	+5.662
9	1	Romania; Ioana Buzatoiu; Vasile Gitlan / Darius Șerban; Valentin Crețu; Raluca Strămăturaru / Mihaela-Carmen Manolescu	56.794	59.710	55.591	57.836	3:49.931	+8.259
