= 2024 FIL World Luge Championships – Women's doubles' sprint =

Women's doubles' sprint at the 2024 FIL World Luge Championships
- Venue: Altenberg bobsleigh, luge, and skeleton track
- Location: Altenberg, Germany
- Dates: 26 January
- Competitors: 32 from 10 nations
- Teams: 16
- Winning time: 28.421

Medalists
gold medal	Andrea Vötter; Marion Oberhofer	Italy
silver medal	Anda Upīte; Zane Kaluma	Latvia
bronze medal	Marta Robežniece; Kitija Bogdanova	Latvia

The Women's doubles' sprint competition at the 2024 FIL World Luge Championships was held on 26 January 2024.

== Results ==
The qualification was started at 12:00. The final was started at 15:41.

Rank	Bib	Name	Country	Qualification		Final	
Rank	Bib	Name	Country	Time	Rank	Time	Diff
1st place, gold medalist(s)	14	Andrea Vötter; Marion Oberhofer	Italy	28.945	10	28.421	1
2nd place, silver medalist(s)	3	Anda Upīte; Zane Kaluma	Latvia	28.584	7	28.438	2
3rd place, bronze medalist(s)	4	Marta Robežniece; Kitija Bogdanova	Latvia	28.234	1	28.467	3
4	10	Maya Chan; Reannyn Weiler	United States	28.462	4	28.482	4
5	12	Dajana Eitberger; Saskia Schirmer	Germany	28.354	2	28.506	5
6	11	Chevonne Forgan; Sophia Kirkby	United States	28.481	5	28.595	6
7	16	Elisa-Marie Storch; Pauline Patz	Germany	28.656	8	28.613	7
8	13	Selina Egle; Lara Kipp	Austria	28.446	3	28.849	8
9	8	Raluca Strămăturaru; Carmen Manolescu	Romania	28.939	9	28.928	9
10	1	Adikeyoumu Gulijienaiti; Zhao Jiaying	China	29.030	12	29.053	10
11	5	Anna Čežíková; Lucie Jansová	Czech Republic	29.159	14	29.146	11
12	7	Olena Stetskiv; Oleksandra Mokh	Ukraine	29.002	11	29.340	12
13	9	Viktorija Ziediņa; Selīna Zvilna	Latvia	29.033	13	29.705	13
14	15	Jessica Degenhardt; Cheyenne Rosenthal	Germany	28.542	6	32.532	14
15	2	Natasha Khytrenko; Viktoriia Koval	Ukraine	29.239	15	33.096	15
16	6	Nikola Domowicz; Dominika Piwkowska	Poland	29.260	16	Did not advance	
