= 2023 FIL European Luge Championships – Women's doubles =

Women's doubles at the 2023 FIL European Luge Championships
- Venue: Sigulda bobsleigh, luge, and skeleton track
- Location: Sigulda, Latvia
- Dates: 14 January
- Competitors: 12 from 6 nations
- Teams: 6
- Winning time: 1:26.281

Medalists
gold medal	Andrea Vötter; Marion Oberhofer	Italy
silver medal	Anda Upīte; Sanija Ozoliņa	Latvia
bronze medal	Jessica Degenhardt; Cheyenne Rosenthal	Germany

The women's doubles competition at the 2023 FIL European Luge Championships was held on 14 January 2023.

== Results ==
The first run was held at 10:44 and the second run at 12:15.

Rank	Bib	Name	Country	Run 1	Rank	Run 2	Rank	Total	Diff
1st place, gold medalist(s)	5	Andrea Vötter; Marion Oberhofer	Italy	43.235	1	43.046	1	1:26.261	
2nd place, silver medalist(s)	3	Anda Upīte; Sanija Ozoliņa	Latvia	43.387	2	43.395	4	1:26.782	+0.501
3rd place, bronze medalist(s)	8	Jessica Degenhardt; Cheyenne Rosenthal	Germany	43.534	4	43.305	2	1:26.839	+0.558
4	4	Selina Egle; Lara Kipp	Austria	43.497	3	43.497	3	1:26.841	+0.560
5	6	Raluca Strămăturaru; Carmen Manolescu	Romania	43.994	5	43.923	6	1:27.917	+1.636
6	2	Olena Stetskiv; Oleksandra Mokh	Ukraine	45.783	6	43.732	5	1:29.515	+3.234
