= Madara Pavlova =

Latvian luger (born 2008)

- Pavlova in 2026

Personal information
- Nationality: Latvian
- Born: 18 September 2008 (age 18)

Sport
- Sport: Luge
Medal record
Women's luge
Representing Latvia
European Championships
Bronze medal – third place	2026 Oberhof	Team relay

Madara Pavlova (born 18 September 2008) is a Latvian luger.

== Career ==
During the 2025–26 Luge World Cup, she earned her first career podium on 5 December 2025, finishing in third place in the mixed doubles event. In January 2026, she competed at the 2026 FIL European Luge Championships, and won a bronze medal in the team relay event. She also finished in fifth place in the doubles event, along with Anda Upīte. She then competed in the first European Championship mixed doubles event and finished in seventh place.
