= Florian Müller (luger) =

German luger (born 2001)

- Müller in 2026

Personal information
- Nationality: German
- Born: 9 October 2001 (age 25) Erlabrunn, Germany

Sport
- Sport: Luge
- Event: Doubles
Medal record
Men's luge
Representing Germany
European Championships
Silver medal – second place	2026 Oberhof	Doubles
Silver medal – second place	2026 Oberhof	Mixed doubles
Junior World Championships
Gold medal – first place	2022 Winterberg	Team relay
Silver medal – second place	2022 Winterberg	Singles

Florian Müller (born 9 October 2001) is a German luger.

== Career ==
Müller competed at the 2022 Junior World Luge Championships and won a gold medal in the team relay with a time of 2:25.617 and a silver medal in the singles event with a time of 1:53.205.

After beginning his career in singles competition, he switched to doubles, competing with Toni Eggert. In February 2025, he competed at the 2025 FIL World Luge Championships and finished in fifth place in the doubles event, along with Eggert, with a time 1:16.821. During the 2024–25 Luge World Cup, in the season opening race on 30 November 2024, he earned his first career doubles win with a time of 1:34.929. They finished the World Cup ranked fourth with 606 points.

During the 2025–26 Luge World Cup, on 13 December 2025, Müller earned his second career World Cup doubles win with a time of 1:26.222.

In January 2026, he competed at the 2026 FIL European Luge Championships and won a silver medal in the doubles event with a time of 1:22.941. He then won a silver medal in the first European Championship mixed doubles event, with a time of 1:34.330.
