= 2023 FIL World Luge Championships =

International luge competition

- Venue: Oberhof, Germany
- Dates: 27–29 January

The 2023 FIL World Luge Championships was the 51st edition and held from 27 to 29 January 2023 at the Oberhof bobsleigh, luge, and skeleton track in Oberhof, Germany.

== Schedule ==
Nine events were held.

All times are local (UTC+1).

Date	Time	Events
27 January	09:00	Women's doubles' sprint qualification
27 January	09:25	Men's doubles' sprint qualification
27 January	10:15	Women's sprint qualification
27 January	11:40	Men's sprint qualification
27 January	13:04	Men's doubles' sprint final
27 January	13:34	Women's doubles' sprint final
27 January	14:21	Women's sprint final
27 January	15:11	Men's sprint final
28 January	08:28	Men's doubles 1st run
28 January	09:10	Women's doubles 1st run
28 January	10:05	Men's doubles 2nd run
28 January	10:46	Women's doubles 2nd run
28 January	11:48	Women's 1st run
28 January	13:17	Women's 2nd run
29 January	10:03	Men's 1st run
29 January	11:38	Men's 2nd run
29 January	13:40	Team relay

== Medal summary ==
* Host nation (Germany)

Rank	Nation	Gold	Silver	Bronze	Total
1	Germany*	8	5	3	16
2	Austria	1	4	3	8
3	Italy	0	0	2	2
4	Latvia	0	0	1	1
Totals (4 entries)		9	9	9	27

=== Medalists ===
Event	Gold		Silver		Bronze	
Men's singles	Jonas Müller; Austria	1:25.478	Max Langenhan; Germany	1:25.582	David Gleirscher; Austria	1:25.599
Men's doubles	Germany; Toni Eggert; Sascha Benecken	1:23.517	Germany; Tobias Wendl; Tobias Arlt	1:23.688	Austria; Yannick Müller; Armin Frauscher	1:23.709
Men's sprint	Felix Loch; Germany	33.544	Jonas Müller; Austria	33.617	Max Langenhan; Germany	33.666
Men's doubles' sprint	Germany; Toni Eggert; Sascha Benecken	26.248	Germany; Tobias Wendl; Tobias Arlt	26.284	Austria; Yannick Müller; Armin Frauscher	26.317
Women's singles	Anna Berreiter; Germany	1:23.991	Julia Taubitz; Germany	1:24.049	Dajana Eitberger; Germany	1:24.107
Women's doubles	Germany; Jessica Degenhardt; Cheyenne Rosenthal	1:17.619	Austria; Selina Egle; Lara Kipp	1:17.745	Italy; Andrea Vötter; Marion Oberhofer	1:17.806
Women's sprint	Dajana Eitberger; Germany	26.204	Julia Taubitz; Germany	26.205	Anna Berreiter; Germany	26.232
Women's doubles' sprint	Germany; Jessica Degenhardt; Cheyenne Rosenthal	31.205	Austria; Selina Egle; Lara Kipp	31.221	Italy; Andrea Vötter; Marion Oberhofer	31.228
Team relay	Germany; Anna Berreiter; Max Langenhan; Toni Eggert; Sascha Benecken	2:22.266	Austria; Madeleine Egle; Jonas Müller; Yannick Müller; Armin Frauscher	2:22.289	Latvia; Kendija Aparjode; Kristers Aparjods; Mārtiņš Bots; Roberts Plūme	2:22.666
