= Zane Kaluma =

Latvian luger (born 2004)

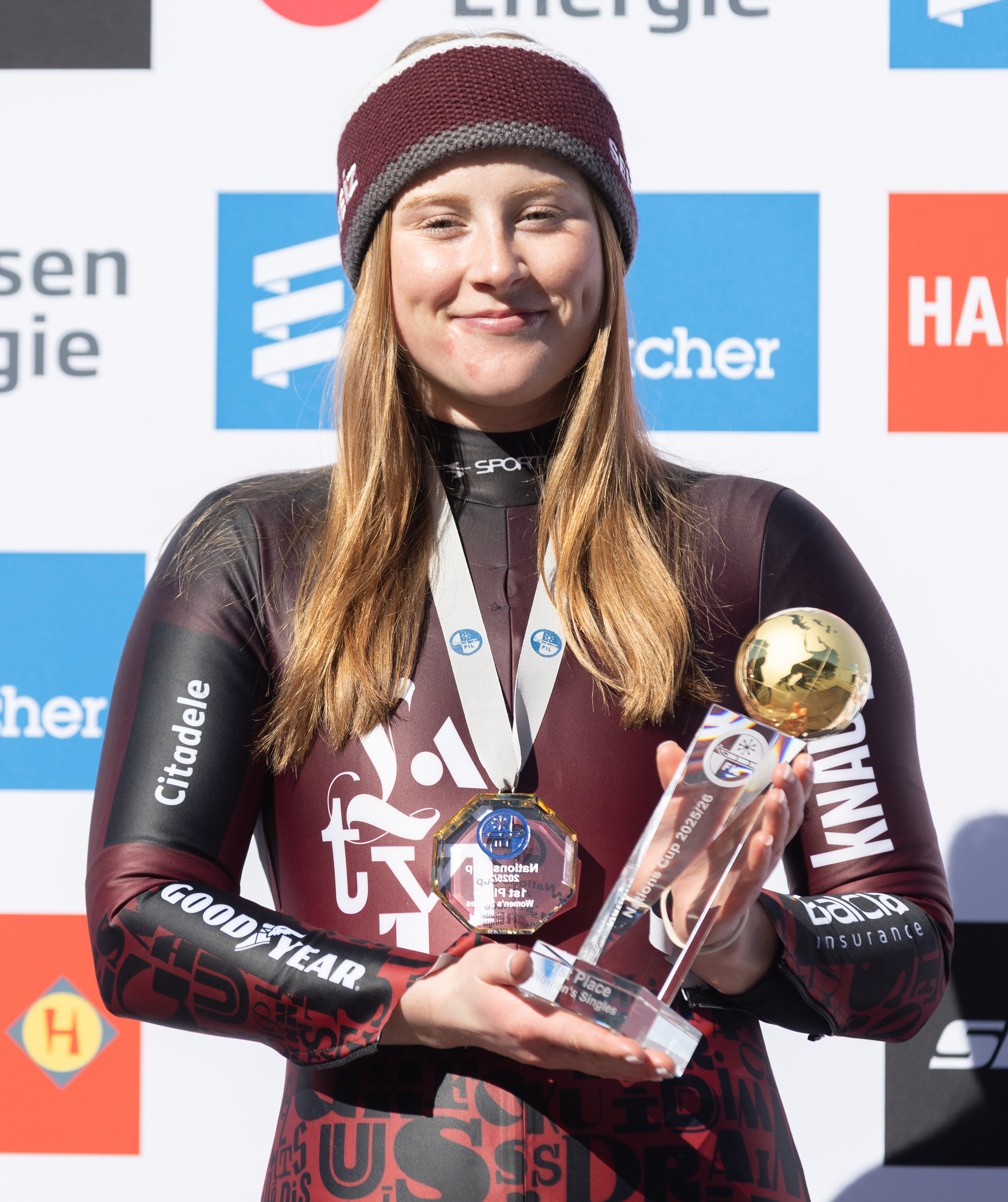
- Kaluma in 2026

Personal information
- Nationality: Latvian
- Born: 3 December 2004 (age 21)

Sport
- Sport: Luge
Medal record
Women's luge
Representing Latvia
World Championships
Silver medal – second place	2024 Altenberg	Doubles
Silver medal – second place	2024 Altenberg	Doubles' sprint
Bronze medal – third place	2024 Altenberg	Team relay

Zane Kaluma (born 3 December 2004) is a Latvian luger.

== Career ==
Kaluma competed at the 2024 FIL World Luge Championships and won silver medals in the doubles and doubles' sprint events, along with Anda Upīte. She also won a bronze medal in the team relay with a time of 3:11.275.

During the 2024–25 Luge World Cup she earned her first career podium in the doubles event on 7 December 2024, finishing in third with a time of 1:34.109. During the final race of the season on 22 February 2025, she again finished in third in the doubles event with a time of 2:01.862.
