= 2024 FIL European Luge Championships =

- Venue: Olympic Sliding Centre Innsbruck
- Location: Innsbruck, Austria
- Dates: 13–14 January

The 2024 FIL European Luge Championships were held from 13 to 14 January 2024 in Innsbruck, Austria.

== Schedule ==
Five events were held.

All times are local (UTC+1).

| Date | Time | Events |
|---|---|---|
| 13 January | 09:00 | 1st run Women |
| 13 January | 10:30 | 2nd run Women |
| 13 January | 11:55 | 1st run Doubles Men |
| 13 January | 12:43 | 1st run Doubles Women |
| 13 January | 13:40 | 2nd run Doubles Men |
| 13 January | 14:32 | 2nd run Doubles Women |
| 14 January | 10:00 | 1st run Men |
| 14 January | 11:30 | 2nd run Men |
| 14 January | 13:30 | Team relay |

== Medal summary ==
=== Medal table ===
* Host nation (Austria)

| Rank | Nation | Gold | Silver | Bronze | Total |
|---|---|---|---|---|---|
| 1 | Austria* | 4 | 1 | 0 | 5 |
| 2 | Germany | 1 | 2 | 3 | 6 |
| 3 | Italy | 0 | 1 | 1 | 2 |
| 3 | Latvia | 0 | 1 | 1 | 2 |
| Totals (4 entries) | | 5 | 5 | 5 | 15 |

=== Medalists ===
| Event | Gold | | Silver | | Bronze | |
|---|---|---|---|---|---|---|
| Men's singles | Jonas Müller; Austria | 1:38.655 | Nico Gleirscher; Austria | 1:38.981 | Max Langenhan; Germany | 1:39.083 |
| Women's singles | Madeleine Egle; Austria | 1:19.200 | Julia Taubitz; Germany | 1:19.224 | Anna Berreiter; Germany | 1:19.439 |
| Men's doubles | Austria; Thomas Steu; Wolfgang Kindl | 1:18.690 | Latvia; Mārtiņš Bots; Roberts Plūme | 1:18.862 | Germany; Tobias Wendl; Tobias Arlt | 1:18.986 |
| Women's doubles | Germany; Jessica Degenhardt; Cheyenne Rosenthal | 1:20.178 | Italy; Andrea Vötter; Marion Oberhofer | 1:20.192 | Latvia; Marta Robežniece; Kitija Bogdanova | 1:20.438 |
| Team relay | Austria; Madeleine Egle; Thomas Steu / Wolfgang Kindl; Jonas Müller; Selina Egle / Lara Michaela Kipp | 2:52.190 | Germany; Julia Taubitz; Tobias Wendl / Tobias Arlt; Max Langenhan; Jessica Degenhardt / Cheyenne Rosenthal | 2:52.376 | Italy; Verena Hofer; Emanuel Rieder / Simon Kainzwaldner; Dominik Fischnaller; Andrea Vötter / Marion Oberhofer | 2:52.651 |
