= Dajana Eitberger =

German luger (born 1991)

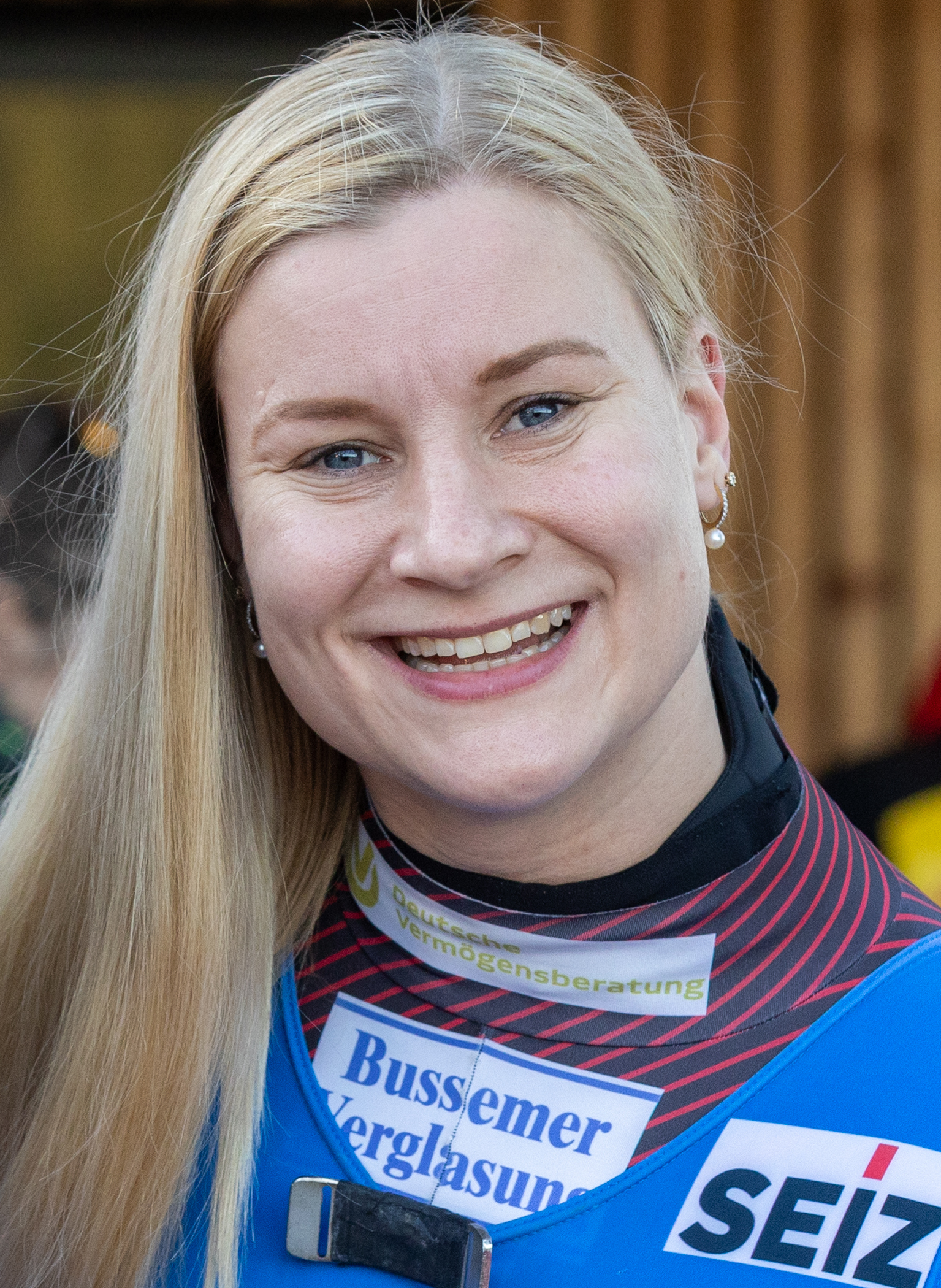
- Eitberger in 2026

Personal information
- Nationality: German
- Born: 7 January 1991 (age 35) Ilmenau, Germany
- Height: 1.80 m (5 ft 11 in)
- Weight: 78 kg (172 lb)

Sport
- Country: Germany
- Sport: Luge
- Events: Singles, Doubles
Medal record
Women's luge
Representing Germany
Olympic Games
Gold medal – first place	2026 Milano Cortina	Team relay
Silver medal – second place	2018 Pyeongchang	Singles
Silver medal – second place	2026 Milano Cortina	Doubles
World Championships
Gold medal – first place	2023 Oberhof	Sprint
Gold medal – first place	2024 Altenberg	Team relay
Silver medal – second place	2025 Whistler	Mixed doubles
Bronze medal – third place	2016 Königssee	Sprint
Bronze medal – third place	2019 Winterberg	Sprint
Bronze medal – third place	2021 Königssee	Singles
Bronze medal – third place	2021 Königssee	Sprint
Bronze medal – third place	2023 Oberhof	Singles
Bronze medal – third place	2025 Whistler	Doubles
European Championships
Gold medal – first place	2015 Sochi	Singles
Gold medal – first place	2015 Sochi	Team relay
Gold medal – first place	2026 Oberhof	Team relay
Silver medal – second place	2023 Sigulda	Singles
Bronze medal – third place	2014 Sigulda	Singles
Bronze medal – third place	2019 Oberhof	Singles
Bronze medal – third place	2026 Oberhof	Doubles
World Cup
Event	1st	2nd	3rd
Singles	8	5	14
Sprint	2	5	6
Team relay	6	1	0
Total	16	11	20
- Updated as of 26 February 2023

Dajana Eitberger (born 7 January 1991) is a German luger. She currently represents Germany in the women's doubles event in the Luge World Cup.

== Career ==
During the 2014–15 Luge World Cup season she was victorious in one event which was the final race of the season in Sochi. During that season she came in second twice and third four time and finished second in the overall standing behind her teammate, Natalie Geisenberger. The event in Sochi and doubled as the European championship and as such she is the current European champion.

During the 2015–16 Luge World Cup Eitberger was on the winners platform on the podium once (at the season opener in Igls), was second twice and third three times. She once again finished the season sixth in the standings.

Eitberger won the silver medal at the 2018 Olympics in Pyeongchang, again behind Natalie Geisenberger. She missed the 2019/20 season due to childbirth, subsequently returned to competition, but finished the 2021–22 Luge World Cup outside of the top ten, and did not qualify for the 2022 Olympics.

She competed at the 2024 FIL World Luge Championships and won a gold medal in the team relay.

In July 2024, it was announced she would compete with Magdalena Matschina in doubles beginning during the 2024–25 Luge World Cup. She competed at the 2025 FIL World Luge Championships and won a silver medal in the inaugural mixed doubles event at the FIL World Luge Championships. She also won a bronze medal in the doubles event.

At the 2026 Winter Olympics in Italy, Eitberger won gold in the Team relay event and won silver in the Women's Doubles event with Matschina. It was the first Winter Olympic Games where a women's doubles event was held.

== Results ==
=== World Championships ===
- 10 medals – (2 gold, 1, silver, 7 bronze)

Year	Age	Singles	Sprint	Doubles	Doubles sprint	Team relay	Mixed doubles
(Latvia) 2015 Sigulda	24	6th	—	—	—	—	—N/a
(Germany) 2016 Königssee	25	20th	Bronze	—	—	—	—N/a
(Austria) 2017 Innsbruck	26	9th	5th	—	—	—	—N/a
(Germany) 2019 Winterberg	28	12th	Bronze	—	—	—	—N/a
(Russia) 2020 Sochi	29	—	—	—	—	—	—N/a
(Germany) 2021 Königssee	30	Bronze	Bronze	—	—	—	—N/a
(Germany) 2023 Oberhof	31	Bronze	Gold	—	—	—	—N/a
(Germany) 2024 Altenberg	33	—	—	6th	5th	Gold	—N/a
(Canada) 2025 Whistler	34	—	—N/a	Bronze	—N/a	—	Silver

=== World Cup ===
Season	Singles									Sprint				Team relay						Points	Overall	Singles	Sprint
Season	1	2	3	4	5	6	7	8	9	1	2	3	4	1	2	3	4	5	6	Points	Overall	Singles	Sprint
2012–13	–	–	–	–	–	4	–	–	–	—N/a	—N/a	—N/a	—N/a	–	–	–	–	–	–	60	35th	35th	—N/a
2013–14	40	4	9	7	5	4	3	5	7	—N/a	—N/a	—N/a	—N/a	–	–	–	–	–	–	432	5th	5th	—N/a
2014–15	2	7	6	3	3	2	3	3	1	4	4	2	—N/a	–	–	–	–	1	1	851		2nd	
2015–16	1	9	3	9	6	3	19	10	7	3	2	2	N/A	1	–	–	–	–	–	712		6th	1st
2016–17	3	9	5	8	16	–	4	8	3	1	6	–	N/A	–	–	–	–	–	–	553		7th	NC
2017–18	2	11	3	6	5	2	1	DNF	4	9	1	–	4	–	–	–	–	1	–	754	2nd	2nd	NC
2018–19	8	8	25	1	14	8	25	3	3	3	6	2	N/A	–	–	–	–	–	–	631	4th	4th	2nd
2020–21	3	6	1	13	5	11	11	5	4	3	3	3	N/A	–	–	1	–	–	CNX	698	3rd	4th	3rd
2021–22	5	5	9	9	–	DNF	–	–	–	3	–	–	N/A	–	–	–	–	–	–	270	18th	19th	13rd
2022–23	10	4	1	1	2	3	4	1	6	7	2	4	—N/a	–	2	–	–	1	–	852	2nd	2nd	2nd

Note: Prior to 2020/21 season, to be classified in sprint standings athletes must compete on all sprint events throughout the season.
