= 2026 FIL European Luge Championships =

Luge competition

- Venue: Oberhof bobsleigh, luge, and skeleton track
- Location: Oberhof, Germany
- Dates: 17–24 January

The 2026 FIL European Luge Championships were held from 17 to 24 January 2026 in Oberhof, Germany. Mixed singles and doubles event made their European Championships debut.

== Medal summary ==
=== Medal table ===
* Host nation (Germany)

Rank	Nation	Gold	Silver	Bronze	Total
1	Germany*	5	4	2	11
2	Austria	2	3	2	7
3	Latvia	0	0	2	2
4	Switzerland	0	0	1	1
Totals (4 entries)		7	7	7	21

=== Medalists ===
Event	Gold		Silver		Bronze	
Men's singles	Jonas Müller; Austria	1:24.549	Felix Loch; Germany	1:24.640	Max Langenhan; Germany	1:24.824
Women's singles	Merle Fräbel; Germany	1:22.867	Lisa Schulte; Austria	1:23.146	Natalie Maag; Switzerland	1:23.148
Mixed singles	Germany; Max Langenhan; Julia Taubitz	1:34.206	Germany; Felix Loch; Merle Fräbel	1:34.269	Austria; Jonas Müller; Lisa Schulte	1:34.559
Men's doubles	Germany; Tobias Wendl; Tobias Arlt	1:22.687	Germany; Toni Eggert; Florian Müller	1:22.941	Austria; Juri Gatt; Riccardo Schöpf	1:23.076
Women's doubles	Germany; Jessica Degenhardt; Cheyenne Rosenthal	1:23.956	Austria; Selina Egle; Lara Kipp	1:24.137	Germany; Dajana Eitberger; Magdalena Matschina	1:24.288
Mixed doubles	Austria; Thomas Steu / Wolfgang Kindl; Selina Egle / Lara Kipp	1:34.156	Germany; Toni Eggert / Florian Müller; Jessica Degenhardt / Cheyenne Rosenthal	1:34.330	Latvia; Mārtiņš Bots / Roberts Plūme; Marta Robežniece / Kitija Bogdanova	1:34.373
Team relay	Germany; Merle Fräbel; Tobias Wendl / Tobias Arlt; Felix Loch; Dajana Eitberger / Magdalena Matschina	3:10.452	Austria; Lisa Schulte; Juri Gatt / Riccardo Schöpf; Jonas Müller; Selina Egle / Lara Kipp	3:10.599	Latvia; Elīna Ieva Bota; Mārtiņš Bots / Roberts Plūme; Kristers Aparjods; Anda Upīte / Madara Pavlova	3:11.362
