= Marion Oberhofer =

Italian luger (born 2000)

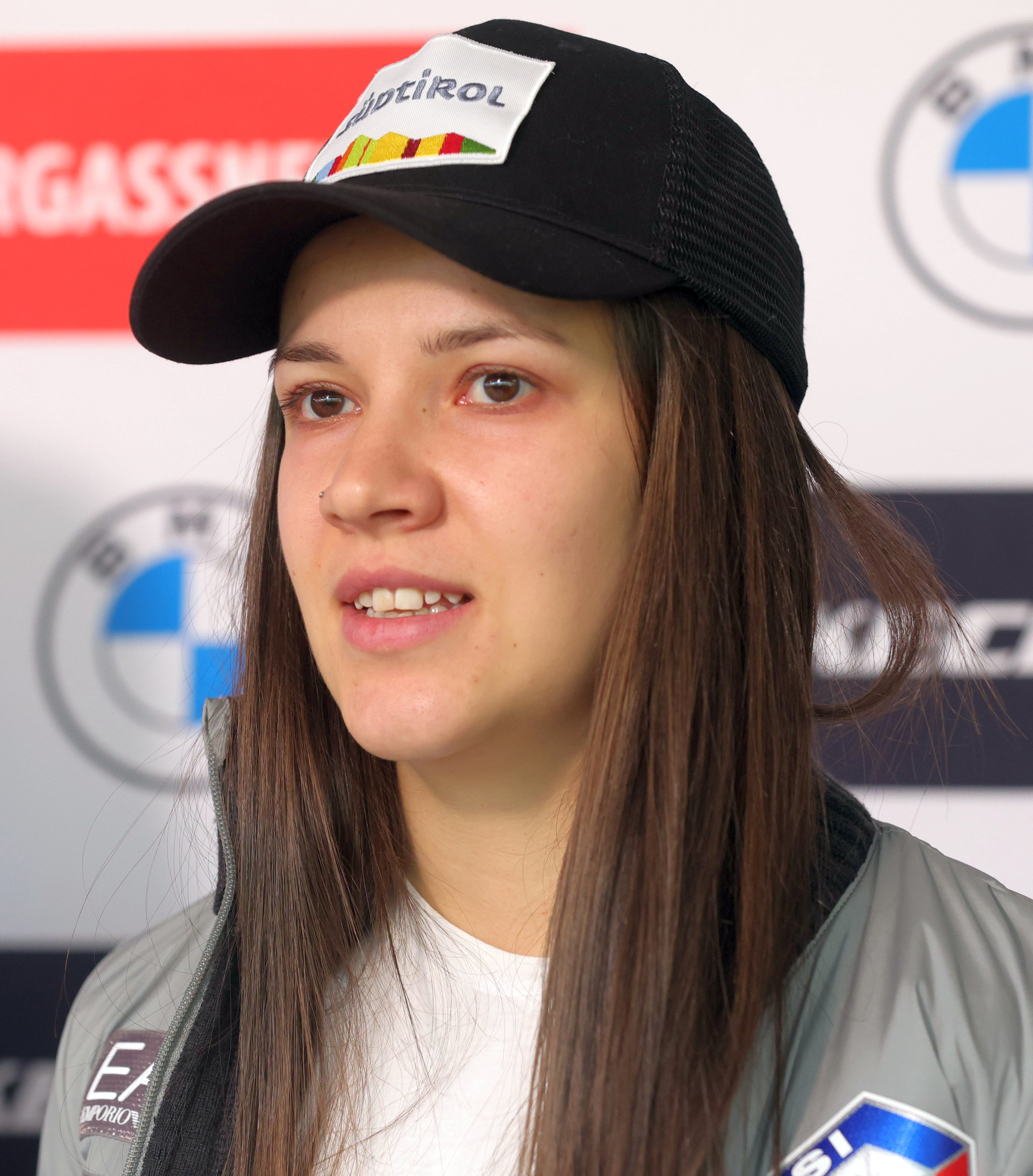
- Oberhofer in 2024

Personal information
- Nationality: Italian
- Born: 14 December 2000 (age 25) Innichen, South Tyrol

Sport
- Sport: Luge
Medal record
Women's luge
Representing Italy
Olympic Games
Gold medal – first place	2026 Milano Cortina	Doubles
Bronze medal – third place	2026 Milano Cortina	Team relay
World Championships
Gold medal – first place	2024 Altenberg	Doubles' sprint
Bronze medal – third place	2023 Oberhof	Doubles
Bronze medal – third place	2023 Oberhof	Doubles' sprint
European Championships
Gold medal – first place	2023 Sigulda	Doubles
Silver medal – second place	2024 Igls	Doubles
Bronze medal – third place	2024 Igls	Team relay
Bronze medal – third place	2025 Winterberg	Doubles
Bronze medal – third place	2025 Winterberg	Team relay
Winter Youth Olympic Games
Bronze medal – third place	2016 Lillehammer	Mixed team

Marion Oberhofer (born 14 December 2000) is an Italian luger. She represented Italy at the 2026 Winter Olympics.

== Career ==
In January 2023, Oberhofer represented Italy at the 2023 FIL European Luge Championships and won a gold medal in the doubles event with her doubles teammate Andrea Vötter. She then competed at the 2023 FIL World Luge Championships and won bronze medals in the doubles and doubles' sprint events.

She won the doubles overall 2022–23 Luge World Cup with 1,010 points, and won the doubles sprint along with Selina Egle and Lara Kipp. She again won the doubles overall 2023–24 Luge World Cup.

In January 2024, she competed at the 2024 FIL European Luge Championships and won a silver medal in the doubles event and a bronze medal in the team relay. She then competed at the 2024 FIL World Luge Championships and won a gold medal in the doubles' sprint with a time of 28.421.

In January 2025, she competed at the 2025 FIL European Luge Championships, and won bronze medals in the doubles and team relay events. She then competed at the 2025 FIL World Luge Championships and finished in fourth place in the doubles event, finishing 113 thousandths of a second from winning bronze.

At the 2026 Winter Olympics, she won a gold medal in the doubles event, along with Vötter. It was the first time a women's doubles luge event was contested at the Olympics. She also won a bronze medal in the team relay.
