= 2024 FIL World Luge Championships =

Luge event in Altenberg, Germany

- Venue: Altenberg, Germany
- Dates: 26–28 January

The 2024 FIL World Luge Championships were the 52nd edition and held from 26 to 28 January 2024 at the Altenberg bobsleigh, luge, and skeleton track in Altenberg, Germany.

== Schedule ==
Nine events were held.

All times are local (UTC+1).

Date	Time	Events
26 January	08:30	Men's doubles' sprint qualification
26 January	09:30	Women's sprint qualification
26 January	10:45	Men's sprint qualification
26 January	12:00	Women's doubles' sprint qualification
26 January	13:00	Men's doubles' sprint final
26 January	13:55	Women's sprint final
26 January	14:47	Men's sprint final
26 January	15:40	Women's doubles' sprint final
27 January	08:50	Women's doubles 1st run
27 January	09:55	Women's doubles 2nd run
27 January	11:00	Men's doubles 1st run
27 January	12:45	Men's doubles 2nd run
27 January	14:00	Men's 1st run
27 January	15:15	Men's 2nd run
28 January	10:45	Women's 1st run
28 January	12:20	Women's 2nd run
28 January	14:00	Team relay

== Medal summary ==
=== Medal summary ===
* Host nation (Germany)

Rank	Nation	Gold	Silver	Bronze	Total
1	Austria	4	3	2	9
2	Germany*	3	2	2	7
3	Latvia	1	2	4	7
4	Italy	1	0	0	1
5	United States	0	1	1	2
6	Switzerland	0	1	0	1
Totals (6 entries)		9	9	9	27

=== Medalists ===
Event	Gold		Silver		Bronze	
Men's singles	Max Langenhan; Germany	1:47.813	Nico Gleirscher; Austria	1:48.574	Felix Loch; Germany	1:48.630
Men's doubles	Austria; Juri Gatt; Riccardo Schöpf	1:22.924	Austria; Thomas Steu; Wolfgang Kindl	1:22.970	Germany; Tobias Wendl; Tobias Arlt	1:23.279
Men's sprint	David Gleirscher; Austria	33.001	Max Langenhan; Germany	33.071	Kristers Aparjods; Latvia	33.124
Men's doubles' sprint	Latvia; Mārtiņš Bots; Roberts Plūme	27.863	Austria; Thomas Steu; Wolfgang Kindl	27.895	Austria; Juri Gatt; Riccardo Schöpf	27.973
Women's singles	Lisa Schulte; Austria	1:43.901	Julia Taubitz; Germany	1:44.005	Madeleine Egle; Austria	1:44.076
Women's doubles	Austria; Selina Egle; Lara Kipp	1:24.761	Latvia; Anda Upīte; Zane Kaluma	1:24.811	United States; Chevonne Forgan; Sophia Kirkby	1:24.897
Women's sprint	Julia Taubitz; Germany	37.702	Natalie Maag; Switzerland	37.774	Elīna Ieva Vītola; Latvia	37.813
Women's doubles' sprint	Italy; Andrea Vötter; Marion Oberhofer	28.421	Latvia; Anda Upīte; Zane Kaluma	28.438	Latvia; Marta Robežniece; Kitija Bogdanova	28.467
Team relay	Germany; Julia Taubitz; Tobias Wendl; Tobias Arlt; Max Langenhan; Dajana Eitberger; Saskia Schirmer	3:10.869	United States; Summer Britcher; Dana Kellogg; Frank Ike; Tucker West; Chevonne Forgan; Sophia Kirkby	3:11.227	Latvia; Elīna Ieva Vītola; Mārtiņš Bots; Roberts Plūme; Kristers Aparjods; Anda Upīte; Zane Kaluma	3:11.275
