= Anda Upīte =

Latvian luger (born 2000)

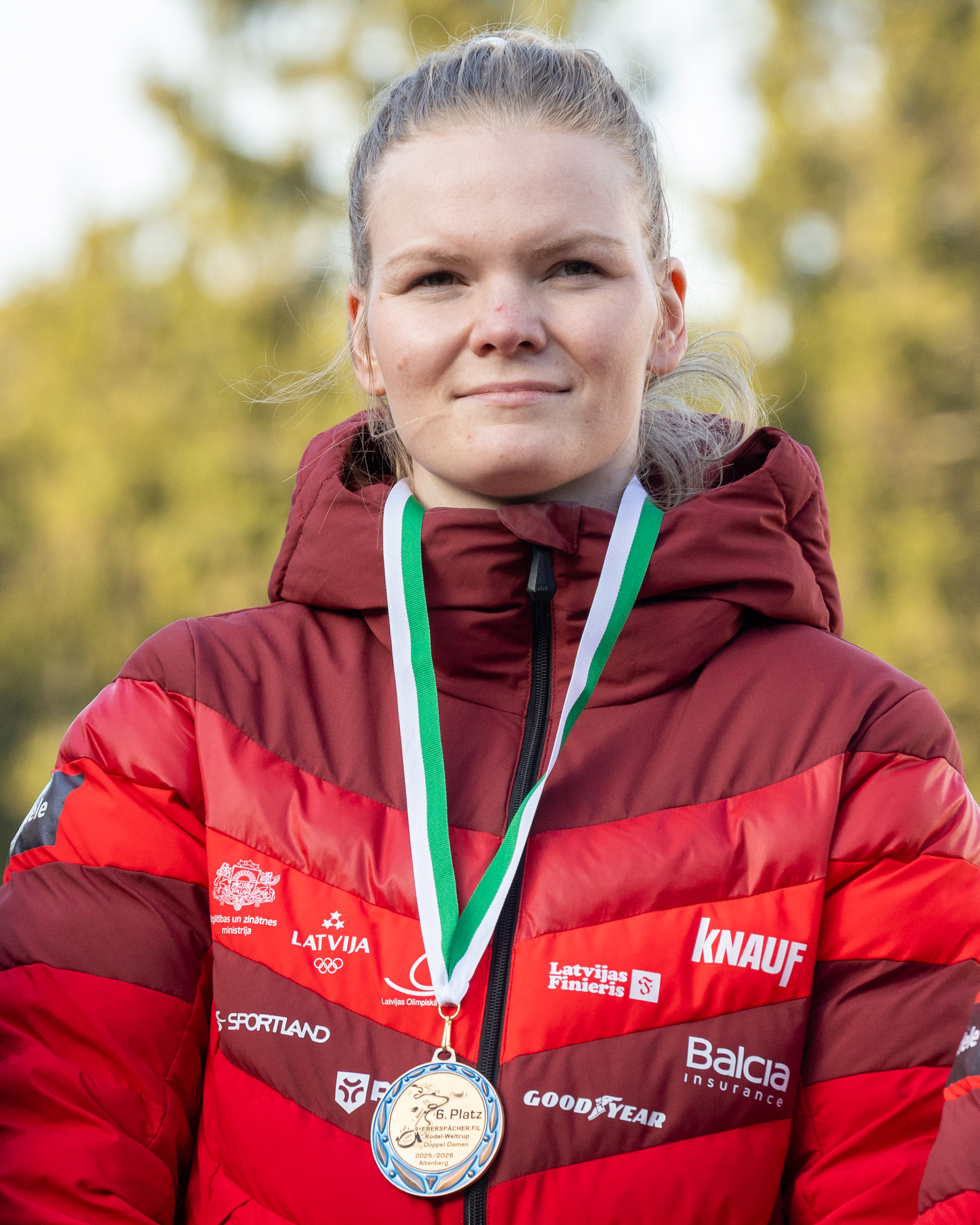
- Upīte in 2026

Personal information
- Nationality: Latvian
- Born: 21 March 2000 (age 26)

Sport
- Sport: Luge
Medal record
Women's luge
Representing Latvia
World Championships
Silver medal – second place	2024 Altenberg	Doubles
Silver medal – second place	2024 Altenberg	Doubles' sprint
Bronze medal – third place	2024 Altenberg	Team relay
European Championships
Silver medal – second place	2023 Sigulda	Doubles
Bronze medal – third place	2026 Oberhof	Team relay

Anda Upīte (born 21 March 2000) is a Latvian luger.

== Career ==
Upīte competed at the 2024 FIL World Luge Championships and won silver medals in the doubles and doubles' sprint events, along with Zane Kaluma. She also won a bronze medal in the team relay with a time of 3:11.275.

In January 2026, she competed at the 2026 FIL European Luge Championships, and won a bronze medal in the team relay event. She also finished in fifth place in the doubles event, along with Madara Pavlova. She then competed in the first European Championship mixed doubles event and finished in seventh place.
