= Andrea Vötter =

Italian luger (born 1995)

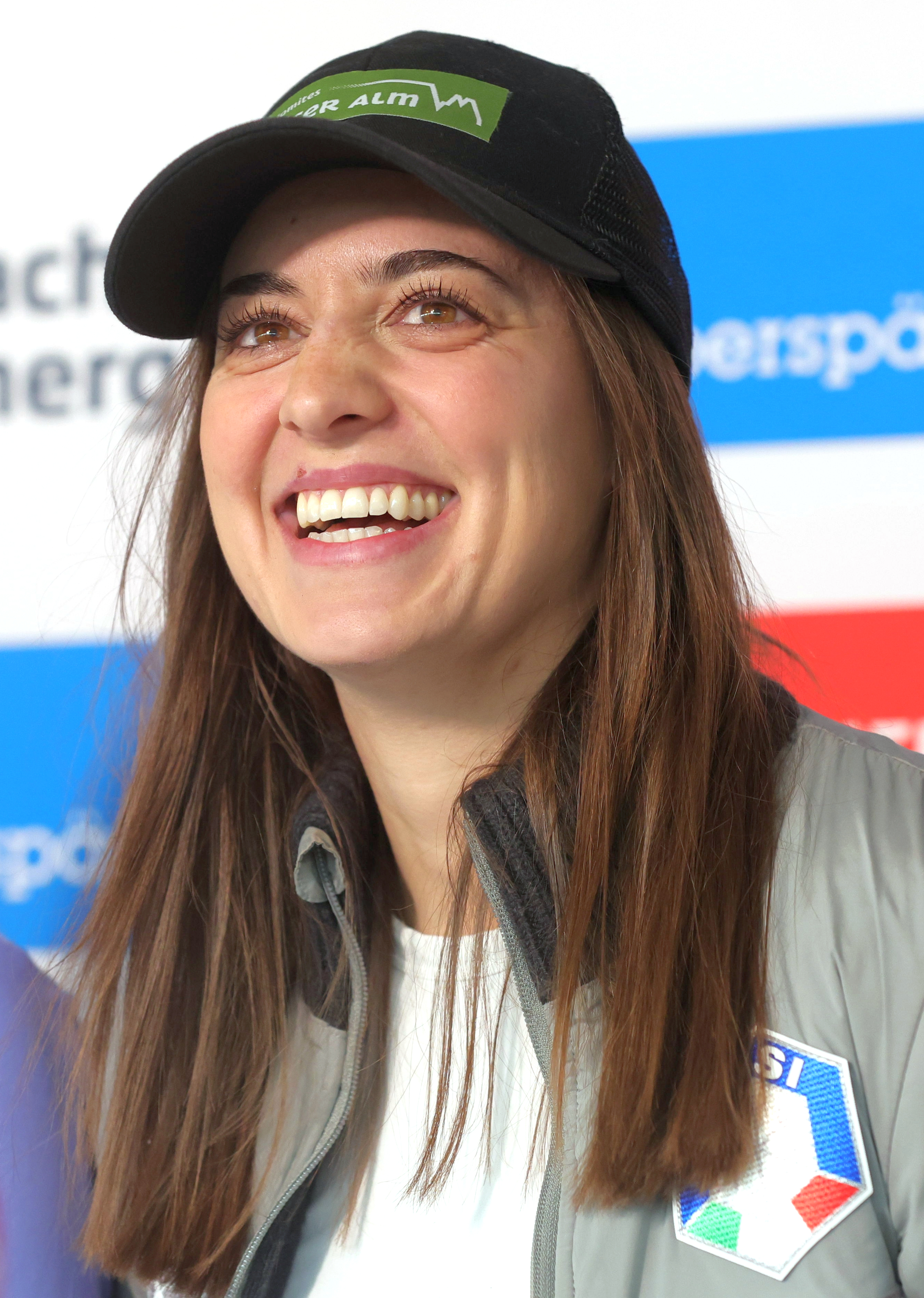
- Vötter in 2024

Personal information
- Born: 3 April 1995 (age 31) Brixen, Italy
- Height: 1.68 m (5 ft 6 in)
- Weight: 73 kg (161 lb)

Sport
- Country: Italy
- Sport: Luge
- Event: Singles/Doubles
Medal record
Women's luge
Representing Italy
Olympic Games
Gold medal – first place	2026 Milano Cortina	Doubles
Bronze medal – third place	2026 Milano Cortina	Team relay
World Championships
Gold medal – first place	2024 Altenberg	Doubles' sprint
Bronze medal – third place	2023 Oberhof	Doubles
Bronze medal – third place	2023 Oberhof	Doubles' sprint
European Championships
Gold medal – first place	2019 Oberhof	Team relay
Gold medal – first place	2023 Sigulda	Doubles
Silver medal – second place	2020 Lillehammer	Team relay
Silver medal – second place	2024 Igls	Doubles
Bronze medal – third place	2024 Igls	Team relay
Bronze medal – third place	2025 Winterberg	Doubles
Bronze medal – third place	2025 Winterberg	Team relay

Andrea Vötter (born 3 April 1995) is an Italian luger. She has competed in the 2014, 2018, 2022, and 2026 Winter Olympics and FIL World Cup a part of the Italian national team.

== Sports Career ==
Vötter competed at the 2014 Winter Olympics for Italy. In the Women's singles she placed 19th. Vötter's best Luge World Cup overall finish is 7th in 2018–19.

At the 2024 World Championships at Altenberg, Germany, she along with partner Marion Oberhofer became the Doubles' sprint champion.

At the 2026 Winter Olympics, she won a gold medal in the women's doubles event, along with Oberhofer. It was the first time a women's doubles luge event was held at the Olympics. She also won a bronze medal in the team relay.

== See also ==
- Italian sportswomen multiple medalists at Olympics and World Championships
