= Marta Robežniece =

Latvian luger (born 2005)

- Robežniece in 2026

Personal information
- Nationality: Latvian
- Born: 11 August 2005 (age 21) Riga, Latvia

Sport
- Sport: Luge
Medal record
Women's luge
Representing Latvia
World Championships
Bronze medal – third place	2024 Altenberg	Doubles' sprint
European Championships
Bronze medal – third place	2024 Igls	Doubles
Bronze medal – third place	2026 Oberhof	Mixed doubles
Junior World Championships
Bronze medal – third place	2023 Bludenz	Doubles

Marta Robežniece (born 11 August 2005) is a Latvian luger.

== Career ==
In January 2024, Robežniece competed at the 2024 FIL European Luge Championships and won a bronze medal in the doubles event, along with Kitija Bogdanova. She then competed at the 2024 FIL World Luge Championships and won a bronze medal in the doubles' sprint with a time of 28.467.

During the opening race of the 2024–25 Luge World Cup on 30 November 2024, she earned her first career World Cup podium, finishing in third place in the doubles event with a time of 1:35.419. The next day, she finished in second in the mixed doubles event with a time of 1:44.604.

In January 2026, she competed at the 2026 FIL European Luge Championships and won a bronze medal in the first European Championship mixed doubles event, with a time of 1:34.373. She was selected to represent Latvia at the 2026 Winter Olympics. She competed in the doubles event and finished in fourth place with a time of 1:46.796.
