= Selina Egle =

Austrian luger (born 2003)

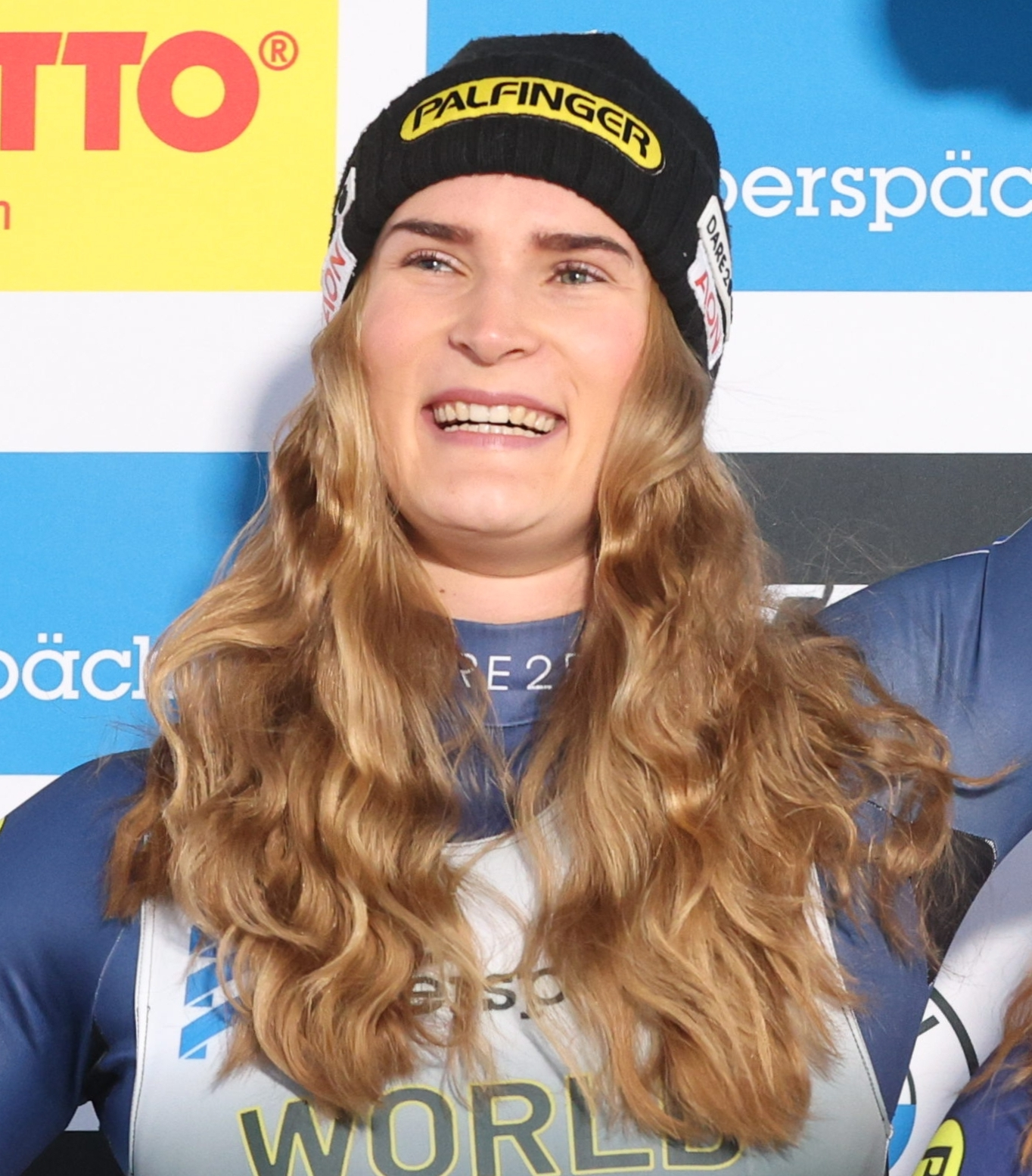
- Egle in 2024

Personal information
- Nationality: Austrian
- Born: 15 January 2003 (age 23)

Sport
- Sport: Luge
Medal record
Women's luge
Representing Austria
Olympic Games
Silver medal – second place	2026 Milano Cortina	Team relay
Bronze medal – third place	2026 Milano Cortina	Doubles
World Championships
Gold medal – first place	2024 Altenberg	Doubles
Gold medal – first place	2025 Whistler	Doubles
Gold medal – first place	2025 Whistler	Mixed doubles
Silver medal – second place	2023 Oberhof	Doubles
Silver medal – second place	2023 Oberhof	Doubles' sprint
Silver medal – second place	2025 Whistler	Team relay
European Championships
Gold medal – first place	2024 Igls	Team relay
Gold medal – first place	2025 Winterberg	Team relay
Gold medal – first place	2025 Winterberg	Doubles
Gold medal – first place	2026 Oberhof	Mixed doubles
Silver medal – second place	2026 Oberhof	Doubles
Silver medal – second place	2026 Oberhof	Team relay

Selina Egle (born 15 January 2003) is an Austrian luger. She is a three-time World Champion.

== Career ==
Egle was selected to compete at the 2020 Winter Youth Olympics in doubles, however, she suffered a fractured metatarsus during a training session and had to withdraw from the competition.

Egle made her international debut for Austria at the 2023 FIL World Luge Championships where she won silver medals in the doubles and doubles' sprint events, along with her doubles teammate Lara Kipp.

At the 2024 FIL World Luge Championships, she won a gold in the doubles event with a time of 1:24.761.

In January 2025, she competed at the 2025 FIL European Luge Championships, and won gold medals in the doubles and team relay events. She then competed at the 2025 FIL World Luge Championships and won a gold medal in the inaugural mixed doubles event at the FIL World Luge Championships with a time of 1:22.894. She also competed in the doubles event and broke a track record with their first run, in a time of 38.858 seconds. They finished with a time of 1:17.724, to win their second consecutive gold medal.

In January 2026, she competed at the 2026 FIL European Luge Championships and won silver medals in the doubles and team relay events. She then won a gold medal in the first European Championship mixed doubles event, with a Oberhof luge track record time of 1:34.156.

She represented Austria at the 2026 Winter Olympics and won a bronze medal in the doubles event, along with Kipp on 11 February 2025. The next day she won a silver medal in the team relay.

== Personal life ==
Egle's older sister, Madeleine Egle, is also a luger.
