= Luge at the 2026 Winter Olympics – Qualification =

The qualification process for the five luge events at the 2026 Winter Olympics is based on performance of competitors at five designated events. Results at these events determine the Olympic Qualification ranking list that is used for quota allocation to National Olympic Committees (NOC).

== Qualification rules ==
=== Maximum quota places per event ===
There will be five luge events at the 2026 Winter Olympics: singles and doubles for both men and women, and a relay event. A maximum of 106 quota spots are available to athletes to compete at the games. A maximum 59 men and 47 women may qualify with the following event specific maximums in place.

Maximum quota places per event
	Men	Women
singles	25	25
doubles	17	11
relay	11	

In men's and women's singles events the top fifteen NOCs first qualify one athlete. Then, NOCs second best athletes are ranked and the best seven of those qualify. Finally, NOCs third best ranked athletes are compared, and the best three of those qualify. In men's doubles the top fourteen qualify one pair, three of those NOCs qualify a second pair. In women's doubles the top eleven ranked NOCs qualify one pair. If an event quota is not filled through this method then the next NOC who has not received a quota is eligible. If there is still quotas remaining then the next ranked athletes will be used respecting the NOC maximum of three per individual event and two per doubles event.

=== Neutral athletes ===
On 31 October 2025, the CAS ruled that Russian athletes who satisfied the IOC's rules for neutral status should be allowed to qualify to the Olympics. However, the ruling carried nothing binding that required the FIL to include neutrals in their competitions.

=== Olympic Qualification ranking events ===
The following five stages of the 2025–26 Luge World Cup and one Olympic test event, count towards the Olympic Qualification ranking list. Originally 'stage 1' was to have been at Innsbruck on 4–7 December 2025, but track reconstruction forced changes to the world cup schedule and the FIL chose to include the Olympic test event rather than have two out of five qualifying races in Winterberg.

- Stage 1: Cortina d'Ampezzo, 27–30 November 2025 (Olympic test event)
- Stage 2: Park City, 10–13 December 2025
- Stage 3: Lake Placid, 17–21 December 2025
- Stage 4: Sigulda, 30 December 2025–4 January 2026
- Stage 5: Winterberg, 6–11 January 2026

== Quota allocation ==
Provisional allocations according to the FIL as of January 11th, 2026.

=== Current summary ===
Nations	Men's	Men's Doubles	Women's	Women's Doubles	Relay	Athletes
Argentina			1			1
Australia	1					1
Austria	3	2	3	1	Yes	12
Canada		1	2	1		6
China	1 (Note: Prioritized quota place to complete team relay.)	1	1	1	Yes	6
Czech Republic	1					1
Germany	3	2	3	1	Yes	12
Individual Neutral Athletes	1		1			2
Italy	3	2	2	1	Yes	11
Japan	1					1
Latvia	2	2	2	1	Yes	10
Poland	1	1	1	1	Yes	6
Romania	2	1	1	1	Yes	7
Slovakia	1	1		1		5
South Korea			1			1
Sweden	1		1			2
Switzerland			1			1
Ukraine	2	2	2	1	Yes	10
United States	2	2	3	1	Yes	11
Total: 19 NOCs	25	17	25	11	9	106

=== Men ===
Singles

Sleds qualified	Countries	Athletes total	Nation
3	3	9	Austria; Germany; Italy
2	4	8	Latvia; Ukraine; United States; Romania
1	8	8	Australia; Slovakia; Czech Republic; Sweden; Poland; Japan; Individual Neutral Athletes; China
25	15	25	

Pos.	Racer	(Italy) Cortina d'Ampezzo	(United States) Park City	(United States) Lake Placid	(Latvia) Sigulda	(Germany) Winterberg	Total
1	(Austria) Jonas Müller	100	100	60	85	100	445
2	(Germany) Felix Loch	60	46	100	100	85	391
3	(Germany) Max Langenhan	55	85	85	70	55	350
4	(Austria) Nico Gleirscher	50	42	50	60	70	272
5	(Latvia) Kristers Aparjods	85	30	55	46	42	258
6	(Austria) Wolfgang Kindl	70	34	70	10	60	244
7	(Austria) David Gleirscher	46	10	36	55	46	193
8	(Latvia) Gints Bērziņš	42	36	28	50	34	190
9	(United States) Jonathan Gustafson	28	55	42	24	39	188
10	(Germany) David Nößler	39	50	32	34	30	185
11	(Germany) Timon Grancagnolo	36	39	26	39	36	176
12	(Italy) Dominik Fischnaller	0	60	46	10	50	166
13	(Italy) Leon Felderer	34	70	10	32	18	164
14	(Italy) Alex Gufler	32	32	20	30	20	134
15	(Australia) Alexander Ferlazzo	21	22	34	26	25	128
16	(Ukraine) Anton Dukach	30	19	22	25	23	119
17	(Latvia) Kaspars Rinks	18	10	17	42	28	115
18	(Ukraine) Andriy Mandziy	24	1	30	23	32	110
19	(United States) Matthew Greiner	25	23	15	10	26	99
20	(United States) Tucker West	20	2	39	14	21	96
21	(Slovakia) Jozef Ninis	26	10	18	36	0	90
22	(Czech Republic) Ondřej Hyman	15	26	16	17	13	87
23	(United States) Hunter Harris	23	17	19	15	9	83
24	(Sweden) Svante Kohala	17	21	13	22	8	81
25	(Romania) Valentin Crețu	1	15	21	21	22	80
26	(Poland) Mateusz Sochowicz	6		23	28	19	76
27	(Japan) Seiya Kobayashi	7	28	6	16	17	74
28	(Romania) Eduard Craciun	14	20	8	18	14	74
29	(Slovakia) Marian Skupek	9	18	10	20	16	73
30	(Individual Neutral Athletes) Pavel Repilov	16		24		24	64
31	(Bosnia and Herzegovina) Mirza Nikolajev	13	9	7	10	15	54
32	(Italy) Leon Haselrieder	19			19	12	50
33	(Individual Neutral Athletes) Matvei Perestoronin	12		25		11	48
34	(Italy) Lukas Peccei		25	13			38
35	(Canada) Cole Zajanski		24	9			33
36	(Sweden) Rasmus Moberg	10	3	14		6	33
37	(Canada) Theo Downey	22	10				32
38	(China) Bao Zhenyu	8	6	4	6	5	29
39	(South Korea) Kim Ji-min	4	16	1		2	23
40	(Poland) Arkadiusz Trojga	5		5	8	4	22
41	(United Kingdom) Dylan Morse	1	7	1	4	8	21
42	(China) Li Jing		8	3	5	1	17
43	(Czech Republic) Jakub Veprovsky	2	10	1	2	1	16
44	(Finland) Walter Vikström	3	5		3	1	12
45	(Individual Neutral Athletes) Aleksandr Gorbatsevich	11					11
46	(Croatia) Nikola Boban	1	4	2	1	3	11
47	(Latvia) Jānis Gruzdulis-Borovojs				9		9
48	(Slovakia) Bruno Mick				7		7
48	(Georgia (country)) Luka Mtchedliani	1			1	1	3
49	(Slovakia) Stefan Doktor					1	1

Doubles

Sleds qualified	Countries	Athletes total	Nation
2	6 (Note: only eleven NOCs are ranked so three more would be elevated to qualifying two sleds each to fulfill quota.)	24	Austria; Latvia; Germany; Italy; United States; Ukraine
1	5	10	Poland; Slovakia; Romania; China; Canada
17	11	34	

Pos.	Racer	(Italy) Cortina d'Ampezzo	(United States) Park City	(United States) Lake Placid	(Latvia) Sigulda	(Germany) Winterberg	Total
1	(Germany) Tobias Wendl / Tobias Arlt	70	46	50	85	100	351
2	(United States) Marcus Mueller / Ansel Haugsjaa	85	36	100	39	36	296
3	(Austria) Thomas Steu / Wolfgang Kindl	60	55	46	46	85	292
4	(Latvia) Mārtiņš Bots / Roberts Plūme	36	50	85	70	42	283
5	(Italy) Ivan Nagler / Fabian Malleier	46	70	55	50	60	281
6	(Austria) Juri Gatt / Riccardo Schöpf	50	60	42	42	70	264
7	(Latvia) Eduards Ševics-Mikeļševics / Lūkass Krasts	39	42	34	100	46	261
8	(Germany) Toni Eggert / Florian Müller	34	100	60	25	39	258
9	(Austria) Yannick Müller / Armin Frauscher	42	30	70	60	55	257
10	(Germany) Hannes Orlamünder / Paul Gubitz	100	34	28	16	50	228
11	(Italy) Emanuel Rieder / Simon Kainzwaldner	55	39	30	55	34	213
12	(United States) Zachary Di Gregorio / Sean Hollander	20	85	39	36	32	212
13	(Poland) Wojciech Chmielewski / Michał Gancarczyk	28	26	25	30	30	139
14	(United States) Dana Kellogg / Frank Ike	32	32	36	22	16	138
15	(Slovakia) Christián Bosman / Bruno Mick	30	23	26	34	16	129
16	(Ukraine) Ihor Hoi / Nazarii Kachmar	22	21	24	24	25	116
17	(Ukraine) Danyil Martsinovskyi / Bohdan Babura	18	24	20	26	26	114
18	(Romania) Marian Gîtlan / Darius Șerban	21	22	23	21	23	110
19	(Ukraine) Maksym Panchuk / Andrii Muts	17	20	22	23	21	103
20	(Romania) Tudor Ştefan Handaric / Sebastian Motzca	23	25	21		22	91
21	(China) Jubayi Saikeyi / Hou Shuo	24	19		20	24	87
22	(Slovakia) Tomáš Vaverčák / Matej Zmij	26	28	32			86
23	(Italy) Philipp Brunner / Manuel Weissensteiner	25			32	28	85
24	(Latvia) Edvards Marts Markitāns / Roberts Lazdāns				28		28
25	(Canada) Devin Wardrope / Cole Zajanski	19					19

=== Women ===
Singles

Sleds qualified	Countries	Athletes total	Nation
3	3	9	Austria; Germany; United States
2	4	8	Italy; Latvia; Canada; Ukraine
1	8	8	Switzerland; Individual Neutral Athletes; China; South Korea; Poland; Sweden; Argentina; Romania
25	15	25	

Pos.	Racer	(Italy) Cortina d'Ampezzo	(United States) Park City	(United States) Lake Placid	(Latvia) Sigulda	(Germany) Winterberg	Total
1	(Germany) Julia Taubitz	85	42	100	70	85	382
2	(United States) Summer Britcher	30	100	70	100	55	355
3	(Austria) Lisa Schulte	70	39	55	85	60	309
4	(United States) Ashley Farquharson	60	70	85	55	10	280
5	(Italy) Verena Hofer	50	85	36	34	70	275
6	(Austria) Hannah Prock	32	55	30	46	100	263
7	(Germany) Merle Fräbel	100	50	50	60		260
8	(Austria) Dorothea Schwarz	36	60	46	39	32	213
9	(Germany) Anna Berreiter	42	34	42	42	50	210
10	(Switzerland) Natalie Maag	55	46	34	26	42	203
11	(Latvia) Elīna Bota	39	24	39	50	46	198
12	(Italy) Sandra Robatscher	46	22	32	36	34	170
13	(Latvia) Kendija Aparjode	34	36	24	30	39	163
14	(United States) Emily Fischnaller	20	30	60	10	23	143
15	(Canada) Embyr-Lee Susko	28	28	28	20	26	130
16	(Austria) Barbara Allmaier	21	32	22	23	25	123
17	(Italy) Nina Zöggeler	24	25	26	22	19	116
18	(Canada) Trinity Ellis	26	23	23	19	22	113
19	(Canada) Caitlin Nash	23	26	21	15	21	106
20	(Latvia) Zane Kaluma	9	20	19	32	17	97
21	(Ukraine) Yulianna Tunytska	17	21	15	18	12	83
22	(Italy) Alexandra Oberstolz	25			25	30	80
23	(Individual Neutral Athletes) Daria Olesik	22		20		36	78
24	(Ukraine) Olena Smaha	8	17	16	17	20	78
25	(Germany) Anka Jänicke	15		10	24	24	73
26	(Latvia) Margita Sirsniņa	19	10	13	28		70
27	(United States) Emma Erickson	5	19	25		18	67
28	(China) Wang Peixuan	14	9	7	21	16	67
29	(South Korea) Jung Hye-sun	13	16	10	12	13	64
30	(Poland) Klaudia Domaradzka	12	18		16	14	60
31	(Sweden) Tove Kohala	17	10	18		10	55
32	(Argentina) Verónica María Ravenna	2	15	17	13	8	55
33	(China) Hu Huilan	10	8	8	14	15	55
34	(Romania) Ioana-Corina Buzatoiu	7	13	14	10	7	51
35	(Republic of Ireland) Elsa Desmond	3	14	9	7	5	38
36	(United Kingdom) Kaia Hatton	1	7	12	8	6	34
37	(South Korea) Shin Yu-bin	6	10	6		9	31
38	(Germany) Melina Fischer					28	28
39	(Estonia) Emma Seer		5	5	9	4	23
40	(Individual Neutral Athletes) Sofiia Mazur	16					16
41	(Individual Neutral Athletes) Kseniia Shamova	11					11
42	(United Kingdom) Tehya Baylis		6				6
43	(Ukraine) Anna Shkret	4					4

Doubles

Sleds qualified	Countries	Athletes total	Nation
1	11	22	Germany; Austria; United States; Italy; Latvia; Ukraine; Poland; Canada; Romania; Slovakia; China
11	11	22	

Pos.	Racer	(Italy) Cortina d'Ampezzo	(United States) Park City	(United States) Lake Placid	(Latvia) Sigulda	(Germany) Winterberg	Total
1	(Germany) Dajana Eitberger / Magdalena Matschina	100	100	85	85	70	440
1	(Austria) Selina Egle / Lara Michaela Kipp	70	85	100	100	85	440
3	(United States) Chevonne Forgan / Sophia Kirkby	55	55	70	55	55	290
4	(Italy) Andrea Vötter / Marion Oberhofer	85	60	50	70	16	281
5	(Germany) Jessica Degenhardt / Cheyenne Rosenthal	36	70	60		100	266
6	(United States) Maya Chan / Sophia Gordon	36	39	55	50	50	230
7	(Latvia) Marta Robežniece / Kitija Bogdanova	50	16	46	60	46	218
8	(Latvia) Anda Upīte / Madara Pavlova	46	46	42	42	42	218
9	(Germany) Elisa Marie Storch / Pauline Patz	60	30	36	28	60	214
10	(Ukraine) Olena Stetskiv / Oleksandra Mokh	30	36	32	46	32	186
11	(Poland) Nikola Domowicz / Dominika Piwkowska	32	34	39	39	28	172
12	(Canada) Beattie Podulsky / Kailey Allan	26	50	34		39	149
13	(Italy) Nadia Falkensteiner / Annalena Huber	39	42	0	16	36	133
14	(Romania) Raluca Stramaturaru / Mihaela-Carmen Manolescu	28	32	0	36	30	126
15	(Slovakia) Viktoria Praxova / Desana Spitzova	24			34	25	83
16	(Austria) Lena Riedl / Anna Lerch	42				34	76
17	(China) Gulijienaiti Adikeyoumou / Zhao Jiaying	0	16		32	26	74
18	(Latvia) Amanda Ogorodņikova / Selīna Zvilna				30		30
19	(Ukraine) Natasha Khytrenko / Anna Shkret	25					25

=== Next eligible NOC per event ===
If a country rejects a quota spot, then additional quotas become available. A country can be eligible for one quota spot per event in the reallocation process.

Men's singles	Men's doubles	Women's singles	Women's doubles
Bosnia and Herzegovina; Great Britain; Finland; Croatia; Georgia	Romania	Ireland; Great Britain; Estonia	Germany; United States; Latvia; Italy
