= 2025 FIL World Luge Championships – Men's doubles =

Men's doubles at the 2025 FIL World Luge Championships
- Venue: Whistler Sliding Centre
- Location: Whistler, British Columbia, Canada
- Dates: 7 February
- Competitors: 36 from 10 nations
- Teams: 18
- Winning time: 1:16.538

Medalists
gold medal	Hannes Orlamünder; Paul Gubitz	Germany
silver medal	Mārtiņš Bots; Roberts Plūme	Latvia
bronze medal	Tobias Wendl; Tobias Arlt	Germany

The Men's doubles competition at the 2025 FIL World Luge Championships was held on 7 February 2025.

== Results ==
The race was started at 14:01.

Rank	Bib	Name	Country	Run 1	Rank	Run 2	Rank	Total	Diff
1st place, gold medalist(s)	5	Hannes Orlamünder; Paul Gubitz	Germany	38.268	1	38.270	1	1:16.538	
2nd place, silver medalist(s)	14	Mārtiņš Bots; Roberts Plūme	Latvia	38.357	4	38.283	2	1:16.640	+0.102
3rd place, bronze medalist(s)	15	Tobias Wendl; Tobias Arlt	Germany	38.314	2	38.357	5	1:16.671	+0.133
4	13	Thomas Steu; Wolfgang Kindl	Austria	38.348	3	38.346	3	1:16.694	+0.156
5	10	Toni Eggert; Florian Müller	Germany	38.466	7	38.355	4	1:16.821	+0.283
6	12	Yannick Müller; Armin Frauscher	Austria	38.448	6	38.400	7	1:16.848	+0.310
7	4	Marcus Mueller; Ansel Haugsjaa	United States	38.392	5	38.464	8	1:16.856	+0.318
8	9	Ivan Nagler; Fabian Malleier	Italy	38.547	10	38.369	6	1:16.916	+0.378
9	11	Juri Gatt; Riccardo Schöpf	Austria	38.502	9	38.492	9	1:16.994	+0.456
10	8	Zack DiGregorio; Sean Hollander	United States	38.553	11	38.501	10	1:17.054	+0.516
11	3	Eduards Ševics-Mikeļševics; Lūkass Krasts	Latvia	38.469	8	38.626	11	1:17.095	+0.557
12	16	Devin Wardrope; Cole Zajanski	Canada	38.639	12	38.659	13	1:17.298	+0.760
13	7	Wojciech Chmielewski; Jakub Kowalewski	Poland	38.680	13	38.632	12	1:17.312	+0.774
14	6	Emanuel Rieder; Simon Kainzwaldner	Italy	38.820	14	38.679	14	1:17.499	+0.961
15	2	Tomáš Vaverčák; Matej Zmij	Slovakia	38.823	15	39.061	15	1:17.884	+1.346
16	17	Vasile Gîtlan; Darius Şerban	Romania	39.209	16	39.154	16	1:18.363	+1.825
17	1	Ihor Hoi; Nazarii Kachmar	Ukraine	39.757	18	39.183	17	1:18.940	+2.402
18	18	Tudor Handaric; Sebastian Motzca	Romania	39.575	17	39.855	18	1:19.430	+2.892
