= 2024 FIL World Luge Championships – Men's doubles =

Men's doubles at the 2024 FIL World Luge Championships
- Venue: Altenberg bobsleigh, luge, and skeleton track
- Location: Altenberg, Germany
- Dates: 27 January
- Competitors: 52 from 12 nations
- Teams: 26
- Winning time: 1:22.924

Medalists
gold medal	Juri Gatt; Riccardo Schöpf	Austria
silver medal	Thomas Steu; Wolfgang Kindl	Austria
bronze medal	Tobias Wendl; Tobias Arlt	Germany

The Men's doubles competition at the 2024 FIL World Luge Championships was held on 27 January 2024.

== Results ==
The race was started at 14:03.

Rank	Bib	Name	Country	Run 1	Rank	Run 2	Rank	Total	Diff
1st place, gold medalist(s)	15	Juri Gatt; Riccardo Schöpf	Austria	41.453	1	41.471	2	1:22.924	
2nd place, silver medalist(s)	10	Thomas Steu; Wolfgang Kindl	Austria	41.506	2	41.464	1	1:22.970	+0.046
3rd place, bronze medalist(s)	12	Tobias Wendl; Tobias Arlt	Germany	41.721	4	41.558	3	1:23.279	+0.355
4	8	Eduards Ševics-Mikeļševics; Lūkass Krasts	Latvia	41.802	6	41.714	4	1:23.516	+0.592
5	4	Yannick Müller; Armin Frauscher	Austria	41.776	5	41.803	7	1:23.579	+0.655
6	11	Ivan Nagler; Fabian Malleier	Italy	41.835	8	41.773	6	1:23.608	+0.684
7	14	Mārtiņš Bots; Roberts Plūme	Latvia	41.630	3	42.045	11	1:23.675	+0.751
8	13	Hannes Orlamünder; Paul Gubitz	Germany	41.938	9	41.741	5	1:23.679	+0.755
9	1	Dana Kellogg; Frank Ike	United States	42.103	13	41.917	8	1:24.020	+1.096
10	5	Ludwig Rieder; Lukas Gufler	Italy	42.088	11	41.988	9	1:24.076	+1.152
11	7	Wojciech Chmielewski; Jakub Kowalewski	Poland	42.002	10	42.079	13	1:24.081	+1.157
12	6	Emanuel Rieder; Simon Kainzwaldner	Italy	41.830	7	42.296	16	1:24.126	+1.202
13	2	Marcus Mueller; Ansel Haugsjaa	United States	42.097	12	42.047	12	1:24.144	+1.220
14	26	Tomáš Vaverčák; Matej Zmij	Slovakia	42.186	14	42.036	10	1:24.222	+1.298
15	16	Devin Wardrope; Cole Zajanski	Canada	42.367	15	42.154	14	1:24.521	+1.597
16	23	Park Jin-yong; Cho Jung-myung	South Korea	42.488	17	42.268	15	1:24.756	+1.832
17	17	Tudor-Ştefan Handaric; Sebastian Motzca	Romania	42.440	16	42.757	17	1:25.197	+2.273
18	18	Marian Gîtlan; Darius Şerban	Romania	42.513	18	43.828	18	1:26.431	+3.417
19	21	Jubayi Saikeyi; Hou Shuo	China	42.605	19	Did not advance			
20	9	Moritz Jäger; Valentin Steudte	Germany	42.649	20	Did not advance			
21	3	Zack DiGregorio; Sean Hollander	United States	42.680	21	Did not advance			
22	22	Christián Bosman; Michal Macko	Slovakia	42.767	22	Did not advance			
23	24	Ihor Hoi; Nazarii Kachmar	Ukraine	42.892	23	Did not advance			
24	20	Huang Yebo; Peng Junyue	China	43.133	24	Did not advance			
25	25	Vadym Mykyievych; Bohdan Babura	Ukraine	43.565	25	Did not advance			
26	19	Raimonds Baltgalvis; Vitālijs Jegorovs	Latvia	43.782	26	Did not advance			
