= 2024 FIL World Luge Championships – Men's doubles' sprint =

Men's doubles' sprint at the 2024 FIL World Luge Championships
- Venue: Altenberg bobsleigh, luge, and skeleton track
- Location: Altenberg, Germany
- Dates: 26 January
- Competitors: 52 from 12 nations
- Teams: 26
- Winning time: 27.863

Medalists
gold medal	Mārtiņš Bots; Roberts Plūme	Latvia
silver medal	Thomas Steu; Wolfgang Kindl	Austria
bronze medal	Juri Gatt; Riccardo Schöpf	Austria

The Men's doubles' sprint competition at the 2024 FIL World Luge Championships was held on 26 January 2024.

== Results ==
The qualification was started at 08:30. The final was held at 13:04.

Rank	Bib	Name	Country	Qualification		Final	
Rank	Bib	Name	Country	Time	Rank	Time	Diff
1st place, gold medalist(s)	13	Mārtiņš Bots; Roberts Plūme	Latvia	28.116	12	27.863	1
2nd place, silver medalist(s)	15	Thomas Steu; Wolfgang Kindl	Austria	28.046	8	27.895	2
3rd place, bronze medalist(s)	11	Juri Gatt; Riccardo Schöpf	Austria	27.796	1	27.973	3
4	9	Ivan Nagler; Fabian Malleier	Italy	28.190	13	27.998	4
5	8	Emanuel Rieder; Simon Kainzwaldner	Italy	28.101	11	28.032	5
6	12	Hannes Orlamünder; Paul Gubitz	Germany	28.029	7	28.081	6
7	14	Tobias Wendl; Tobias Arlt	Germany	27.901	2	28.131	7
8	21	Raimonds Baltgalvis; Vitālijs Jegorovs	Latvia	28.218	15	28.175	8
9	4	Ludwig Rieder; Lukas Gufler	Italy	28.088	10	28.223	9
10	1	Eduards Ševics-Mikeļševics; Lūkass Krasts	Latvia	27.995	5	28.267	10
11	16	Moritz Jäger; Valentin Steudte	Germany	28.077	9	28.283	11
12	5	Tomáš Vaverčák; Matej Zmij	Slovakia	28.197	14	28.293	12
13	10	Zack DiGregorio; Sean Hollander	United States	28.026	6	28.295	13
14	3	Dana Kellogg; Frank Ike	United States	27.986	4	28.568	14
15	7	Yannick Müller; Armin Frauscher	Austria	27.967	3	28.857	15
16	19	Devin Wardrope; Cole Zajanski	Canada	28.260	16	Did not advance	
17	2	Marian Gîtlan; Darius Şerban	Romania	28.362	17	Did not advance	
18	24	Christián Bosman; Michal Macko	Slovakia	28.421	18	Did not advance	
19	17	Tudor-Ştefan Handaric; Sebastian Motzca	Romania	28.425	19	Did not advance	
20	22	Jubayi Saikeyi; Hou Shuo	China	28.451	20	Did not advance	
21	23	Huang Yebo; Peng Junyue	China	28.502	21	Did not advance	
22	20	Park Jin-yong; Cho Jung-myung	South Korea	28.506	22	Did not advance	
23	18	Ihor Hoi; Nazarii Kachmar	Ukraine	28.693	23	Did not advance	
24	25	Vadym Mykyievych; Bohdan Babura	Ukraine	28.695	24	Did not advance	
25	6	Wojciech Chmielewski; Jakub Kowalewski	Poland	28.792	25	Did not advance	
26	26	Marcus Mueller; Ansel Haugsjaa	United States	30.035	26	Did not advance	
