= 2023 FIL World Luge Championships – Men's doubles' sprint =

Men's doubles sprint at the 2023 FIL World Luge Championships
- Venue: Oberhof bobsleigh, luge, and skeleton track
- Location: Oberhof, Germany
- Date: 27 January
- Competitors: 40 from 12 nations
- Teams: 20
- Winning time: 26.248

Medalists
gold medal	Toni Eggert; Sascha Benecken	Germany
silver medal	Tobias Wendl; Tobias Arlt	Germany
bronze medal	Yannick Müller; Armin Frauscher	Austria

The men's doubles sprint competition at the 2023 FIL World Luge Championships was held on 27 January 2023.

== Results ==
The qualification was held at 09:25 and the final at 13:04.

Rank	Bib	Name	Country	Qualification		Final	
Rank	Bib	Name	Country	Time	Rank	Time	Diff
1st place, gold medalist(s)	13	Toni Eggert; Sascha Benecken	Germany	26.195	1	26.248	
2nd place, silver medalist(s)	14	Tobias Wendl; Tobias Arlt	Germany	26.238	2	26.284	+0.036
3rd place, bronze medalist(s)	9	Yannick Müller; Armin Frauscher	Austria	26.241	3	26.317	+0.069
4	11	Mārtiņš Bots; Roberts Plūme	Latvia	26.793	13	26.371	+0.123
5	5	Emanuel Rieder; Simon Kainzwaldner	Italy	26.381	6	26.421	+0.173
6	8	Hannes Orlamünder; Paul Gubitz	Germany	26.424	8	26.457	+0.209
7	10	Thomas Steu; Lorenz Koller	Austria	26.365	5	26.462	+0.214
8	6	Eduards Ševics-Mikeļševics; Lūkass Krasts	Latvia	26.407	7	26.555	+0.307
9	4	Ludwig Rieder; Patrick Rastner	Italy	26.599	11	26.613	+0.365
10	7	Zack DiGregorio; Sean Hollander	United States	26.533	9	26.646	+0.398
11	3	Wojciech Chmielewski; Jakub Kowalewski	Poland	26.578	10	26.804	+0.556
12	18	Ștefan Handaric; Sebastian Motzca	Romania	26.977	15	26.885	+0.637
13	2	Tomáš Vaverčák; Matej Zmij	Slovakia	26.726	12	26.924	+0.676
14	1	Devin Wardrope; Cole Zajanski	Canada	26.800	14	29.723	+3.475
15	12	Juri Gatt; Riccardo Schöpf	Austria	26.287	4	55.958	+29.710
16	16	Filip Vejdělek; Zdeněk Pěkný	Czech Republic	27.001	16	Did not advance	
17	15	Ihor Hoi; Rostyslav Levkovych	Ukraine	27.272	17	Did not advance	
18	19	Vadym Mykyievych; Bohdan Babura	Ukraine	27.329	18	Did not advance	
19	17	Huang Yebo; Peng Junyue	China	27.416	19	Did not advance	
20	20	Jubayi Saikeyi; Hou Shuo	China	27.789	20	Did not advance	
