= 2023 FIL World Luge Championships – Team relay =

Team relay at the 2023 FIL World Luge Championships
- Venue: Oberhof bobsleigh, luge, and skeleton track
- Location: Oberhof, Germany
- Date: 29 January
- Competitors: 44 from 11 nations
- Teams: 11
- Winning time: 2:22.266

Medalists
gold medal	Anna Berreiter; Max Langenhan; Toni Eggert; Sascha Benecken	Germany
silver medal	Madeleine Egle; Jonas Müller; Yannick Müller; Armin Frauscher	Austria
bronze medal	Kendija Aparjode; Kristers Aparjods; Mārtiņš Bots; Roberts Plūme	Latvia

The Team relay competition at the 2023 FIL World Luge Championships was held on 29 January 2023.

== Results ==
The race was started at 13:43.

Rank	Bib	Country	Total	Diff
1st place, gold medalist(s)	11	Germany; Anna Berreiter; Max Langenhan; Toni Eggert / Sascha Benecken	2:22.266	
2nd place, silver medalist(s)	10	Austria; Madeleine Egle; Jonas Müller; Yannick Müller / Armin Frauscher	2:22.289	+0.023
3rd place, bronze medalist(s)	9	Latvia; Kendija Aparjode; Kristers Aparjods; Mārtiņš Bots / Roberts Plūme	2:22.666	+0.400
4	8	Italy; Andrea Vötter; Dominik Fischnaller; Emanuel Rieder / Simon Kainzwaldner	2:23.001	+0.735
5	7	United States; Summer Britcher; Tucker West; Zack DiGregorio / Sean Hollander	2:23.229	+0.963
6	6	Poland; Klaudia Domaradzka; Mateusz Sochowicz; Wojciech Chmielewski / Jakub Kowalewski	2:24.563	+2.297
7	3	Slovakia; Katarína Šimoňáková; Jozef Ninis; Tomáš Vaverčák / Matej Zmij	2:24.877	+2.611
8	5	Ukraine; Yulianna Tunytska; Andriy Mandziy; Ihor Hoi / Rostyslav Levkovych	2:25.256	+2.990
9	2	Romania; Raluca Strămăturaru; Valentin Creţu; Ştefan Handaric / Sebastian Motzca	2:25.892	+3.626
10	4	Canada; Trinity Ellis; Dylan Morse; Devin Wardrope / Cole Zajanski	2:36.139	+13.873
—	1	China; Wang Peixuan; Alabati Aihemaiti; Huang Yebo / Peng Junyue	Disqualified	
