= 2023 FIL World Luge Championships – Men's doubles =

Men's doubles at the 2023 FIL World Luge Championships
- Venue: Oberhof bobsleigh, luge, and skeleton track
- Location: Oberhof, Germany
- Date: 28 January
- Competitors: 40 from 12 nations
- Teams: 20
- Winning time: 1:23.517

Medalists
gold medal	Toni Eggert; Sascha Benecken	Germany
silver medal	Tobias Wendl; Tobias Arlt	Germany
bronze medal	Yannick Müller; Armin Frauscher	Austria

The Men's doubles competition at the 2023 FIL World Luge Championships was held on 28 January 2023.

== Results ==
The first run was held at 08:28 and the second run at 10:05.

Rank	Bib	Name	Country	Run 1	Rank	Run 2	Rank	Total	Diff
1st place, gold medalist(s)	10	Toni Eggert; Sascha Benecken	Germany	41.730	1	41.787	1	1:23.517	
2nd place, silver medalist(s)	15	Tobias Wendl; Tobias Arlt	Germany	41.893	3	41.795	2	1:23.688	+0.171
3rd place, bronze medalist(s)	3	Yannick Müller; Armin Frauscher	Austria	41.839	2	41.870	3	1:23.709	+0.192
4	7	Thomas Steu; Lorenz Koller	Austria	41.930	4	41.977	4	1:23.907	+0.390
5	12	Mārtiņš Bots; Roberts Plūme	Latvia	41.975	5	42.027	6	1:24.002	+0.485
6	14	Emanuel Rieder; Simon Kainzwaldner	Italy	42.047	6	42.043	7	1:24.090	+0.573
7	5	Zack DiGregorio; Sean Hollander	United States	42.120	8	42.012	5	1:24.132	+0.615
8	11	Juri Gatt; Riccardo Schöpf	Austria	42.121	9	42.156	8	1:24.277	+0.760
9	8	Hannes Orlamünder; Paul Gubitz	Germany	42.133	10	42.185	9	1:24.318	+0.801
10	9	Ludwig Rieder; Patrick Rastner	Italy	42.096	7	42.308	11	1:24.404	+0.887
11	6	Wojciech Chmielewski; Jakub Kowalewski	Poland	42.216	12	42.284	10	1:24.500	+0.983
12	13	Eduards Ševics-Mikeļševics; Lūkass Krasts	Latvia	42.194	11	42.562	12	1:24.756	+1.239
13	4	Devin Wardrope; Cole Zajanski	Canada	42.579	14	42.956	14	1:25.535	+2.018
14	17	Filip Vejdělek; Zdeněk Pěkný	Czech Republic	43.052	15	42.894	13	1:25.946	+2.429
15	18	Ihor Hoi; Rostyslav Levkovych	Ukraine	43.248	17	43.363	15	1:26.611	+3.094
16	1	Ştefan Handaric; Sebastian Motzca	Romania	43.188	16	43.657	17	1:26.845	+3.328
17	20	Vadym Mykyievych; Bohdan Babura	Ukraine	43.556	18	43.476	16	1:27.032	+3.515
18	2	Tomáš Vaverčák; Matej Zmij	Slovakia	42.382	13	54.014	18	1:36.396	+12.879
19	19	Huang Yebo; Peng Junyue	China	43.828	19	Did not advance			
20	16	Jubayi Saikeyi; Hou Shuo	China	44.010	20	Did not advance			
