= Luge at the 2026 Winter Olympics – Men's doubles =

Luge men's doubles at the XXV Olympic Winter Games
- Luge pictogram
- Venue: Cortina Sliding Centre
- Date: 11 February 2026
- Competitors: 34 from 11 nations
- Winning time: 1:45.086

Medalists
1st place, gold medalist(s)		Emanuel Rieder; Simon Kainzwaldner	Italy
2nd place, silver medalist(s)		Thomas Steu; Wolfgang Kindl	Austria
3rd place, bronze medalist(s)		Tobias Wendl; Tobias Arlt	Germany

The men's doubles competition in luge at the 2026 Winter Olympics was held on 11 February at the Cortina Sliding Centre in Cortina d'Ampezzo. Emanuel Rieder and Simon Kainzwaldner of Italy won the event. For them, these were their first Olympic medals. Thomas Steu and Wolfgang Kindl of Austria won silver, and Tobias Wendl and Tobias Arlt, multiple Olympic champions, bronze.

== Background ==
Tobias Wendl and Tobias Arlt won the 2014, 2018 and 2022 Olympics, and they qualified for the 2026 Olympics as well. The 2026 silver medalists were Toni Eggert and Sascha Benecken; in 2026 Eggert qualified, but he was competing with Florian Müller. The bronze medalists were Thomas Steu and Lorenz Koller; in 2026 Steu was competing with Wolfgang Kindl. Wendl and Arlt were leading the singles standing of 2025–26 Luge World Cup before the Olympics. Hannes Orlamünder and Paul Gubitz were the 2025 World Champions, but they failed to qualify for the event amidst a stacked field in Germany.

== Summary ==
In the first run, Steu and Kindl set the track record, only to be immediately beaten by 0.003 seconds by Marcus Mueller and Ansel Haugsjaa. Rieder and Kainzwaldner were third but still very close, trailing by 0.014 seconds. Other competitors were at least half a second behind, with Wendl and Arlt in the fifth place. In the second run, first Toni Eggert and Florian Müller who were standing the fourth lost 0.1 seconds to Wendl and Arlt and moved to the position behind them. Rieder and Kainzwaldner made the fastest run though still slower than their result in Run 1, and were leading after their run. Steu and Kindl lost them 0.08 seconds and dropped to the second place. Mueller and Haugsjaa were leading until the bottom, where they made a mistake and finished off the podium. Rieder and Kainzwaldner became the champions.

== Qualification ==
=== Summary ===
Number of sleds	Athletes total	Nations
17	34	11

== Results ==
Rank	Bib	Athletes	Country	Run 1	Rank	Run 2	Rank	Total	Behind
1st place, gold medalist(s)	8	Emanuel Rieder; Simon Kainzwaldner	Italy	52.499	3	52.587	1	1:45.086	—
2nd place, silver medalist(s)	1	Thomas Steu; Wolfgang Kindl	Austria	52.485	2	52.669	4	1:45.154	+0.068
3rd place, bronze medalist(s)	3	Tobias Wendl; Tobias Arlt	Germany	52.583	5	52.593	2	1:45.176	+0.090
4	7	Toni Eggert; Florian Müller	Germany	52.579	4	52.690	6	1:45.269	+0.183
5	6	Mārtiņš Bots; Roberts Plūme	Latvia	52.604	6	52.680	5	1:45.284	+0.198
6	10	Marcus Mueller; Ansel Haugsjaa	United States	52.482 TR	1	52.811	8	1:45.293	+0.207
7	2	Ivan Nagler; Fabian Malleier	Italy	52.647	7	52.657	3	1:45.304	+0.218
8	9	Zack DiGregorio; Sean Hollander	United States	52.744	8	52.723	7	1:45.467	+0.381
9	4	Eduards Ševics-Mikeļševics; Lūkass Krasts	Latvia	52.749	9	52.934	11	1:45.683	+0.597
10	15	Devin Wardrope; Cole Zajanski	Canada	52.996	10	52.910	10	1:45.906	+0.820
11	5	Juri Gatt; Riccardo Schöpf	Austria	53.014	12	52.901	9	1:45.915	+0.829
12	12	Christián Bosman; Bruno Mick	Slovakia	53.121	13	53.004	12	1:46.125	+1.039
13	11	Wojciech Chmielewski; Michał Gancarczyk	Poland	53.000	11	53.246	13	1:46.246	+1.160
14	13	Ihor Hoi; Nazarii Kachmar	Ukraine	53.843	14	53.739	14	1:47.582	+2.496
15	16	Hou Shuo; Jubayi Saikeyi	China	54.108	15	53.930	15	1:48.038	+2.952
16	14	Danyil Martsinovskyi; Bohdan Babura	Ukraine	54.158	17	53.957	16	1:48.115	+3.029
17	17	Marian Gîtlan; Darius Șerban	Romania	54.144	16	54.046	17	1:48.190	+3.104
