= 2020 FIL European Luge Championships – Doubles =

Doubles at the 2020 FIL European Luge Championships
- Venue: Lillehammer Olympic Bobsleigh and Luge Track
- Location: Lillehammer, Norway
- Dates: 18 January
- Competitors: 38 from 9 nations
- Winning time: 1:35.585

Medalists
| gold medal | Aleksandr Denisev; Vladislav Antonov | Russia |
| silver medal | Thomas Steu; Lorenz Koller | Austria |
| bronze medal | Vladislav Yuzhakov; Iurii Prokhorov | Russia |

The Doubles competition at the 2020 FIL European Luge Championships was held on 18 January 2020.

== Competition schedule ==
All times are (UTC+1).

| Date | Time | Event |
|---|---|---|
| 18 January | 12:40 | Run 1 |
| 18 January | 14:00 | Run 2 |

== Results ==
Two runs in one day, were used to determine the winner.

| Rank | Bib | Name | Country | Run 1 | Rank | Run 2 | Rank | Total | Diff |
|---|---|---|---|---|---|---|---|---|---|
| 1st place, gold medalist(s) | 18 | Aleksandr Denisev; Vladislav Antonov | Russia | 47.779 | 1 | 47.806 | 1 | 1:35.585 | |
| 2nd place, silver medalist(s) | 16 | Thomas Steu; Lorenz Koller | Austria | 47.815 | 2 | 47.870 | 2 | 1:35.685 | +0.100 |
| 3rd place, bronze medalist(s) | 12 | Vladislav Yuzhakov; Iurii Prokhorov | Russia | 47.880 | 4 | 47.877 | 3 | 1:35.757 | +0.172 |
| 4 | 4 | Ivan Nagler; Fabian Malleier | Italy | 47.908 | 7 | 47.954 | 4 | 1:35.862 | +0.277 |
| 5 | 13 | Emanuel Rieder; Simon Kainzwaldner | Italy | 47.842 | 3 | 48.156 | 9 | 1:35.998 | +0.413 |
| 6 | 9 | Wojciech Chmielewski; Jakub Kowalewski | Poland | 48.082 | 11 | 48.040 | 5 | 1:36.122 | +0.537 |
| 7 | 17 | Tobias Wendl; Tobias Arlt | Germany | 47.982 | 9 | 48.144 | 8 | 1:36.126 | +0.541 |
| 8 | 19 | Toni Eggert; Sascha Benecken | Germany | 47.922 | 8 | 48.229 | 10 | 1:36.151 | +0.566 |
| 9 | 11 | Ludwig Rieder; Patrick Rastner | Italy | 48.082 | 11 | 48.090 | 7 | 1:36.172 | +0.587 |
| 10 | 20 | Robin Geueke; David Gamm | Germany | 48.182 | 14 | 48.089 | 6 | 1:36.271 | +0.686 |
| 11 | 21 | Vsevolod Kashkin; Konstantin Korshunov | Russia | 47.896 | 6 | 48.406 | 12 | 1:36.302 | +0.717 |
| 12 | 8 | Kristens Putins; Imants Marcinkēvičs | Latvia | 48.026 | 10 | 48.351 | 11 | 1:36.377 | +0.792 |
| 13 | 15 | Oskars Gudramovičs; Pēteris Kalniņš | Latvia | 48.108 | 13 | 48.479 | 13 | 1:36.587 | +1.002 |
| 14 | 3 | Ihor Stakhiv; Andrii Lysetskyi | Ukraine | 48.714 | 17 | 48.886 | 15 | 1:37.600 | +2.015 |
| 15 | 10 | Ihor Hoi; Myroslav Levkovych | Ukraine | 49.457 | 19 | 48.797 | 14 | 1:38.254 | +2.669 |
| 16 | 2 | Filip Vejdělek; Zdeněk Pěkný | Czech Republic | 49.298 | 18 | 49.577 | 16 | 1:38.875 | +3.290 |
| 17 | 6 | Yannick Müller; Armin Frauscher | Austria | 48.361 | 15 | 53.305 | 17 | 1:41.666 | +6.081 |
| 18 | 14 | Andris Šics; Juris Šics | Latvia | 47.884 | 5 | 56.029 | 18 | 1:43.913 | +8.328 |
| | 7 | Tomáš Vaverčák; Matej Zmij | Slovakia | 48.574 | 16 | Did not finish | | | |
