= 2025 FIL World Luge Championships – Team relay =

Team relay at the 2025 FIL World Luge Championships
- Venue: Whistler Sliding Centre
- Location: Whistler, British Columbia, Canada
- Dates: 8 February
- Competitors: 54 from 9 nations
- Teams: 9
- Winning time: 2:50.361

Medalists
gold medal	Julia Taubitz; Hannes Orlamünder; Paul Gubitz; Max Langenhan; Jessica Degenhardt; Cheyenne Rosenthal	Germany
silver medal	Madeleine Egle; Thomas Steu; Wolfgang Kindl; Nico Gleirscher; Selina Egle; Lara Kipp	Austria
bronze medal	Embyr-Lee Susko; Devin Wardrope; Cole Zajanski; Theo Downey; Beattie Podulsky; Kailey Allan	Canada

The Team relay competition at the 2025 FIL World Luge Championships was held on 8 February 2025.

== Results ==
The race was started at 17:00.

Rank	Bib	Country	Total	Diff
1st place, gold medalist(s)	9	Germany; Julia Taubitz; Hannes Orlamünder / Paul Gubitz; Max Langenhan; Jessica Degenhardt / Cheyenne Rosenthal	2:50.361	
2nd place, silver medalist(s)	8	Austria; Madeleine Egle; Thomas Steu / Wolfgang Kindl; Nico Gleirscher; Selina Egle/ Lara Kipp	2:50.492	+0.131
3rd place, bronze medalist(s)	4	Canada; Embyr-Lee Susko; Devin Wardrope / Cole Zajanski; Theo Downey; Beattie Podulsky / Kailey Allan	2:51.641	+1.280
4	7	United States; Emily Sweeney; Marcus Mueller / Ansel Haugsjaa; Jonathan Gustafson; Chevonne Forgan / Sophia Kirkby	2:51.954	+1.539
5	2	Poland; Klaudia Domaradzka; Wojciech Chmielewski / Jakub Kowalewski; Mateusz Sochowicz; Nikola Domowicz / Dominika Piwkowska	2:52.097	+1.736
6	3	Ukraine; Yulianna Tunytska; Ihor Hoi / Nazarii Kachmar; Andriy Mandziy; Olena Stetskiv / Oleksandra Mokh	2:53.125	+2.764
7	1	Romania; Ioana Buzăţoiu; Vasile Gîtlan / Darius Șerban; Valentin Crețu; Raluca Strămăturaru / Carmen Manolescu	2:53.248	+2.887
	6	Latvia; Kendija Aparjode; Mārtiņš Bots / Roberts Plūme; Kristers Aparjods; Marta Robežniece / Kitija Bogdanova	Did not finish	
	5	Italy; Sandra Robatscher; Ivan Nagler / Fabian Malleier; Dominik Fischnaller; Andrea Vötter / Marion Oberhofer	Disqualified	
