= America-Pacific Luge Championship =

America-Pacific Luge Championship is annual luge competition held by International Luge Federation since 2012. There are men's and women's single events and a double event.

== Host cities ==
- 2012: Calgary, Canada
- 2013: Lake Placid, United States
- 2014: Lake Placid, United States
- 2015: Calgary, Canada
- 2016: Park City, United States
- 2019: Whistler, British Columbia, Canada
- 2021: Sochi, Russia
- 2022: Park City, United States
- 2023: Whistler, Canada
- 2024: PyeongChang, South Korea*
- 2025: Lake Placid, United States
- The 2024 event was held in February 2025.

== Men's singles ==
Games	Gold	Silver	Bronze
2012	Samuel Edney; Canada	Isaac Underwood; United States	Bruno Banani; Tonga
2013	Chris Mazdzer; United States	Samuel Edney; Canada	Taylor Morris; United States
2014	Tucker West; United States	Chris Mazdzer; United States	Aidan Kelly; United States
2015	Chris Mazdzer; United States	Tucker West; United States	Mitchel Malyk; Canada
2016	Chris Mazdzer; United States	Tucker West; United States	Mitchel Malyk; Canada
2019	Tucker West; United States	Chris Mazdzer; United States	Reid Watts; Canada
2021	Jonathan Gustafson; United States	Tucker West; United States	Chris Mazdzer; United States
2022	Tucker West; United States	Chris Mazdzer; United States	Alexander Ferlazzo; Australia
2023	Tucker West; United States	Jonathan Gustafson; United States	Alexander Ferlazzo; Australia
2024	Alexander Ferlazzo; Australia	Tucker West; United States	Jonathan Gustafson; United States
2025	Jonathan Gustafson; United States	Tucker West; United States	Alexander Ferlazzo; Australia

== Women's singles ==
Games	Gold	Silver	Bronze
2012	Alex Gough; Canada	Kimberley McRae; Canada	Dayna Clay; Canada
2013	Julia Clukey; United States	Alex Gough; Canada	Erin Hamlin; United States
2014	Erin Hamlin; United States	Emily Sweeney; United States	Summer Britcher; United States
2015	Erin Hamlin; United States	Summer Britcher; United States	Kimberley McRae; Canada
2016	Erin Hamlin; United States	Emily Sweeney; United States	Alex Gough; Canada
2019	Emily Sweeney; United States	Carolyn Maxwell; Canada	Makena Hodgson; Canada
2021	Summer Britcher; United States	Ashley Farquharson; United States	Trinity Ellis; Canada
2022	Emily Sweeney; United States	Brittney Arndt; United States	Ashley Farquharson; United States
2023	Emily Sweeney; United States	Ashley Farquharson; United States	Embyr-Lee Susko; Canada
2024	Ashley Farquharson; United States	No other starters	
2025	Ashley Farquharson; United States	Summer Britcher; United States	Emily Fischnaller; United States

== Men's doubles ==
Games	Gold	Silver	Bronze
2012	Matthew Mortensen; Preston Griffall; United States	Tristan Walker; Justin Snith; Canada	Christian Niccum; Jayson Terdiman; United States
2013	Tristan Walker; Justin Snith; Canada	Matthew Mortensen; Preston Griffall; United States	Jake Hyrns; Andrew Sherk; United States
2014	Matthew Mortensen; Jayson Terdiman; United States	Tristan Walker; Justin Snith; Canada	Justin Krewson; Tristan Jeskanen; United States
2015	Tristan Walker; Justin Snith; Canada	Matthew Mortensen; Jayson Terdiman; United States	Justin Krewson; Andrew Sherk; United States
2016	Matthew Mortensen; Jayson Terdiman; United States	Justin Krewson; Andrew Sherk; United States	Jacob Hyrns; Anthony Espinoza; United States
2019	Tristan Walker; Justin Snith; Canada	Chris Mazdzer; Jayson Terdiman; United States	Caitlin Nash; Natalie Corless; Canada
2021	Tristan Walker; Justin Snith; Canada	Chris Mazdzer; Jayson Terdiman; United States	Devin Wardrope; Cole Zajanski; Canada
2022	Zachary Di Gregorio; Sean Hollander; United States	Dana Kellogg; Duncan Segger; United States	Devin Wardrope; Cole Zajanski; Canada
2023	Devin Wardrope; Cole Zajanski; Canada	Zachary Di Gregorio; Sean Hollander; United States	Marcus Mueller; Ansel Haugsjaa; United States
2024	Zachary Di Gregorio; Sean Hollander; United States	No other starters	
2025	Marcus Mueller; Ansel Haugsjaa; United States	Zachary Di Gregorio; Sean Hollander; United States	Dana Kellogg; Frank Ike; United States

== Women's doubles ==
Games	Gold	Silver	Bronze
2022	Caitlin Nash; Natalie Corless; Canada	Summer Britcher; Emily Sweeney; United States	Maya Chan; Reannyn Weiler; United States
2023	Chevonne Forgan; Sophia Kirkby; United States	Maya Chan; Reannyn Weiler; United States	Embyr-Lee Susko; Beattie Podulsky; Canada
2024	Chevonne Forgan; Sophia Kirkby; United States	No other starters	
2025	Chevonne Forgan; Sophia Kirkby; United States	Maya Chan; Sophia Gordon; United States	Kailey Allan; Beattie Podulsky; Canada

== Medal table ==
Rank	Nation	Gold	Silver	Bronze	Total
1	United States	28	28	16	72
2	Canada	8	6	14	28
3	Australia	1	0	3	4
4	Tonga	0	0	1	1
Totals (4 entries)		37	34	34	105
