= Ihor Hoi =

Ukrainian luger (born 1999)

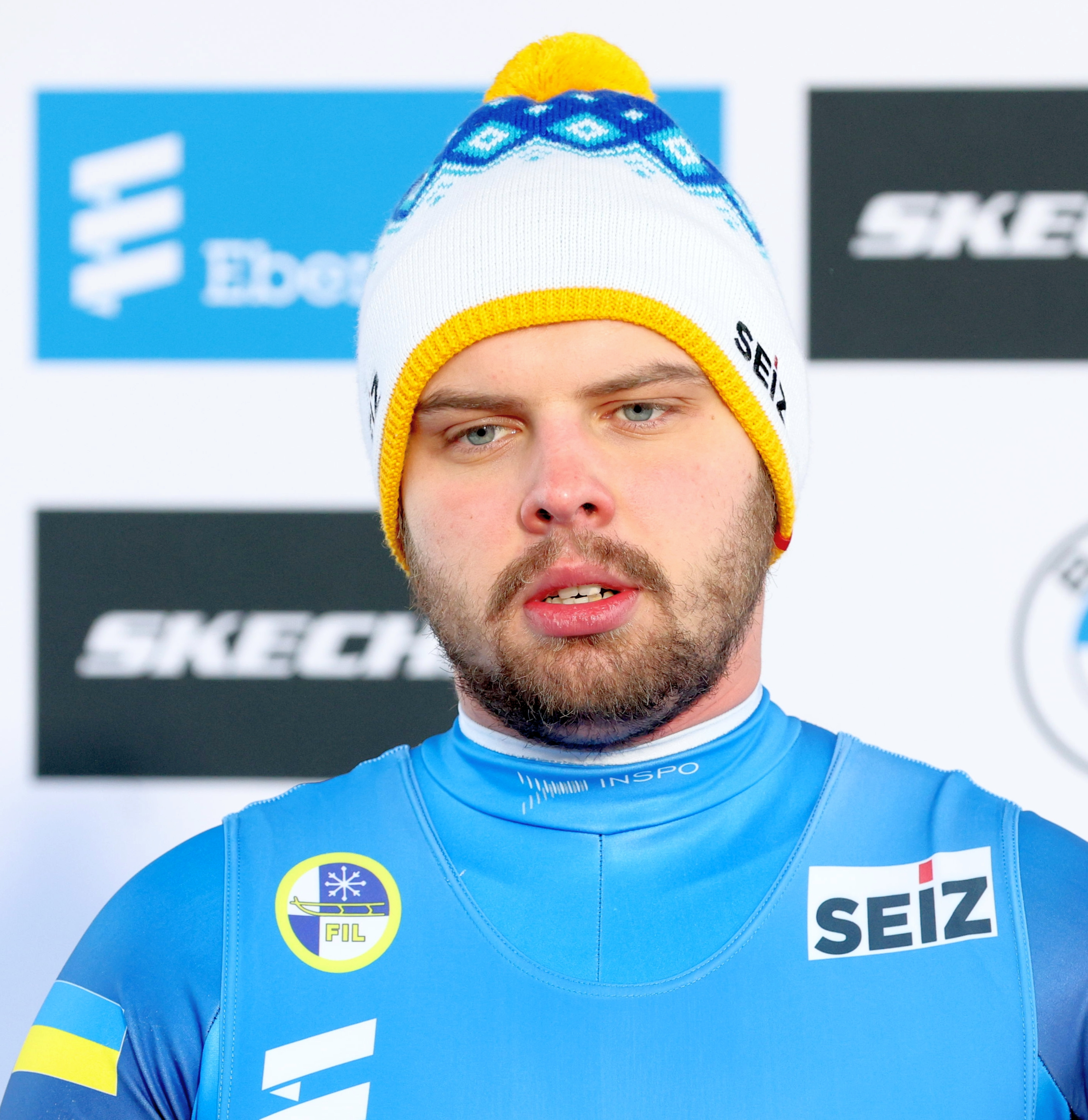
- Hoi in 2024 in Oberhof

Personal information
- Native name: Ігор Анатолійович Гой
- Full name: Ihor Anatoliyovych Hoi
- Nationality: Ukrainian
- Born: 21 June 1999 (age 26) Kremenets, Ukraine

Sport
- Country: Ukraine
- Sport: Luge
- Event: Men's doubles

Ihor Anatoliyovych Hoi (Ukrainian: Ігор Анатолійович Гой, born 21 June 1999 in Kremenets, Ukraine) is a Ukrainian luger. He competed at the 2026 Winter Olympics.

== Career ==
Hoi was previously teamed with Rostyslav Levkovych. Their first World Cup race was during the 2018-19 season in Igls, Austria, where they finished 15th.

Starting from the season 2024–25, Hoi has been competing together with Nazarii Kachmar. They qualified to compete at the 2026 Winter Olympics. In Cortina, they finished 14th in men's doubles.

On January 5, 2025, Hoi and Kachmar finished third in the mixed relay event in Sigulda. The team also included Tunytska, Mandziy, Stetskiv, and Mokh. This marked the first ever medal for Ukraine in the relay event. As of March 2026, the best World Cup doubles finish for both Hoi and Kachmar was 11th in the 2024–25 season in Pyeongchang, South Korea.

== Career results ==
=== Winter Olympics ===
Year	Event	Doubles	Relay
2026	Milan–Cortina, Italy	14	6

=== World Championships ===
Year	Event	Doubles	Relay	Doubles Sprint
2023	Oberhof, Germany	15	8	17
2024	Altenberg, Germany	23	8	23
2025	Whistler, Canada	17	6	—N/a

=== European Championships ===
Year	Event	Doubles	Relay	Mixed Doubles
2020	Lillehammer, Norway	15	—	—N/a
2021	Sigulda, Latvia	23	—	—N/a
2022	St. Moritz, Switzerland	18	—	—N/a
2023	Sigulda, Latvia	10	4	—N/a
2024	Igls, Austria	17	5	—N/a
2025	Winterberg, Germany	13	6	—N/a
2026	Oberhof, Germany	11	5	8

=== Luge World Cup ===
==== Relay podiums ====
Season	Track	Competition	Placement
2024–25	Sigulda, Latvia	Mixed relay	3

==== Rankings ====
Season	Doubles	Doubles Sprint	Overall
2018–19	22	—	—N/a
2019–20	19	—	—N/a
2020–21	24	—	24
2021–22	20	—	22
2022–23	20	17	20
2023–24	16	18	16
2024–25	12	—N/a	—N/a
2025–26	15	—N/a	—N/a
