= Nazarii Kachmar =

Ukrainian luger (born 2005)

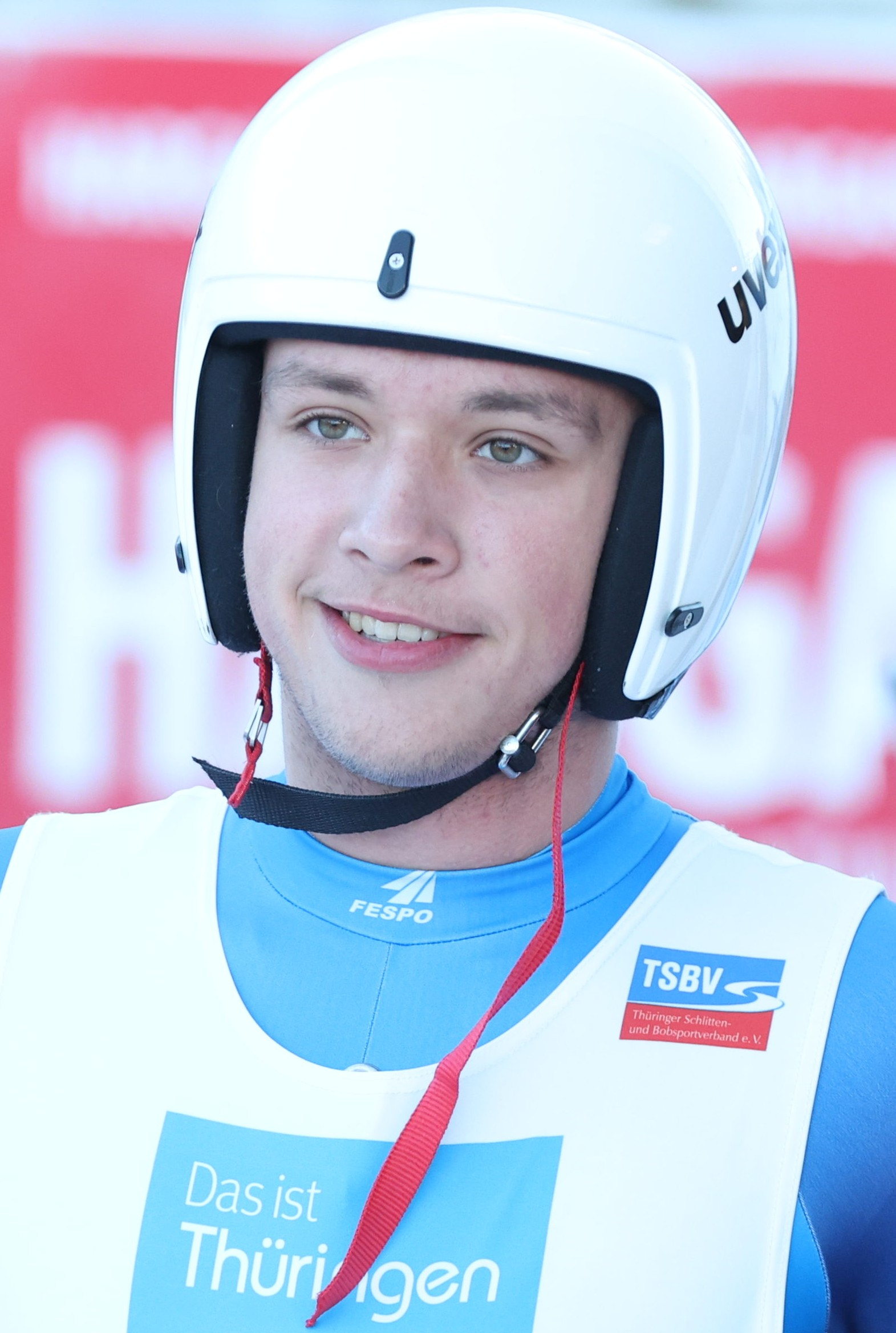
- Kachmar in 2024 in Oberhof

Personal information
- Native name: Назарій Романович Качмар
- Full name: Nazarii Romanovych Kachmar
- Nationality: Ukrainian
- Born: 26 September 2005 (age 20) Lviv, Ukraine

Sport
- Country: Ukraine
- Sport: Luge
- Event: Men's doubles

Nazarii Romanovych Kachmar (Ukrainian: Назарій Романович Качмар, born 26 September 2005) is a Ukrainian luger. He competed at the 2026 Winter Olympics.

== Career ==
Starting from the season 2024–25, Kachmar has been teamed up with Ihor Hoi. They qualified to compete at the 2026 Winter Olympics. In Cortina, they finished 14th in men's doubles.

On January 5, 2025, Hoi and Kachmar finished third in the mixed relay event in Sigulda. The team also included Tunytska, Mandziy, Stetskiv, and Mokh. This marked the first ever medal for Ukraine in the relay event. As of March 2026, the best World Cup doubles finish for both Hoi and Kachmar was 11th in the 2024–25 season in Pyeongchang, South Korea.

== Career results ==
=== Winter Olympics ===
Year	Event	Doubles	Relay
2026	Milan–Cortina, Italy	14	6

=== World Championships ===
Year	Event	Doubles	Relay	Doubles Sprint	Mixed Doubles
2024	Altenberg, Germany	23	8	23	—N/a
2025	Whistler, Canada	17	6	—N/a	10

=== European Championships ===
Year	Event	Doubles	Relay	Mixed Doubles
2024	Igls, Austria	17	5	
2025	Winterberg, Germany	13	6	
2026	Oberhof, Germany	11	5	8

=== Luge World Cup ===
==== Relay podiums ====
Season	Track	Competition	Placement
2024–25	Sigulda, Latvia	Mixed relay	3

==== Rankings ====
Season	Doubles	Doubles Sprint	Overall
2023–24	16	18	16
2024–25	12	—N/a	—N/a
2025–26	15	—N/a	—N/a
