= Bohdan Babura =

Ukrainian luger (born 2005)

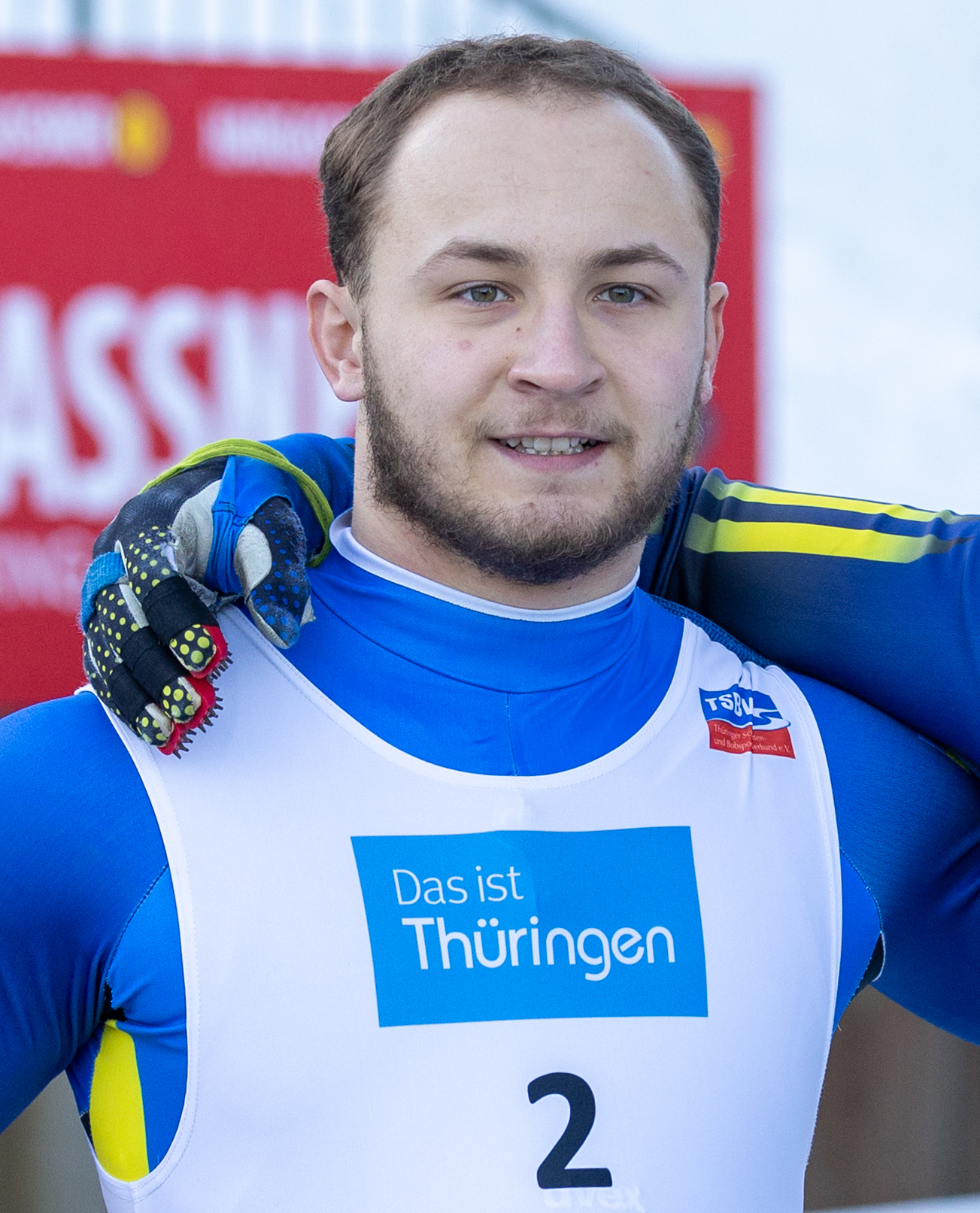
- Babura in January 2026 in Oberhof

Personal information
- Native name: Бабура Богдан Сергійович
- Full name: Bohdan Serhiyovych Babura
- Nationality: Ukrainian
- Born: 25 February 2005 (age 21) Kremenets, Ternopil Oblast, Ukraine
- Height: 1.78 m (5 ft 10 in)
- Weight: 72 kg (159 lb)

Sport
- Country: Ukraine
- Sport: Luge
- Event: Men's doubles

Bohdan Serhiyovych Babura (Ukrainian: Богдан Сергійович Бабура, born 25 February 2005) is a Ukrainian luger. He competed at the 2026 Winter Olympics.

== Career ==
Early in his career, Babura competed in doubles with Vadym Mykyievych, and later with Danyil Martsinovskyi.

He competed with Mykyievych at the 2020 Winter Youth Olympics in Lausanne, Switzerland, where his doubles team was disqualified, and finished 6th in the relay. He went on to compete with Martsinovskyi at the senior 2026 Winter Olympics in Milan–Cortina, Italy, finishing 16th in the men's doubles.

== Career results ==
=== Winter Olympics ===
Year	Event	Doubles	Relay
2026	Milan–Cortina, Italy	16	—

=== World Championships ===
Year	Event	Doubles	Relay	Doubles Sprint
2023	Oberhof, Germany	17	—	18
2024	Altenberg, Germany	25	—	24

=== European Championships ===
Year	Event	Doubles	Relay	Mixed Doubles
2021	Sigulda, Latvia	22	—	—N/a
2022	St. Moritz, Switzerland	21	—	—N/a
2024	Igls, Austria	19	—	—N/a
2026	Oberhof, Germany	12	—	—

=== Luge World Cup ===
==== Rankings ====
Season	Doubles	Doubles Sprint	Doubles Overall
2020–21	29	—	29
2021–22	28	—	29
2022–23	Missed the season		
2023–24	24	—	24
2024–25	Missed the season		
2025–26	16	—N/a	

== Personal life ==
Babura studied at the Lviv State University of Physical Culture.
