= Makena Hodgson =

Canadian luger

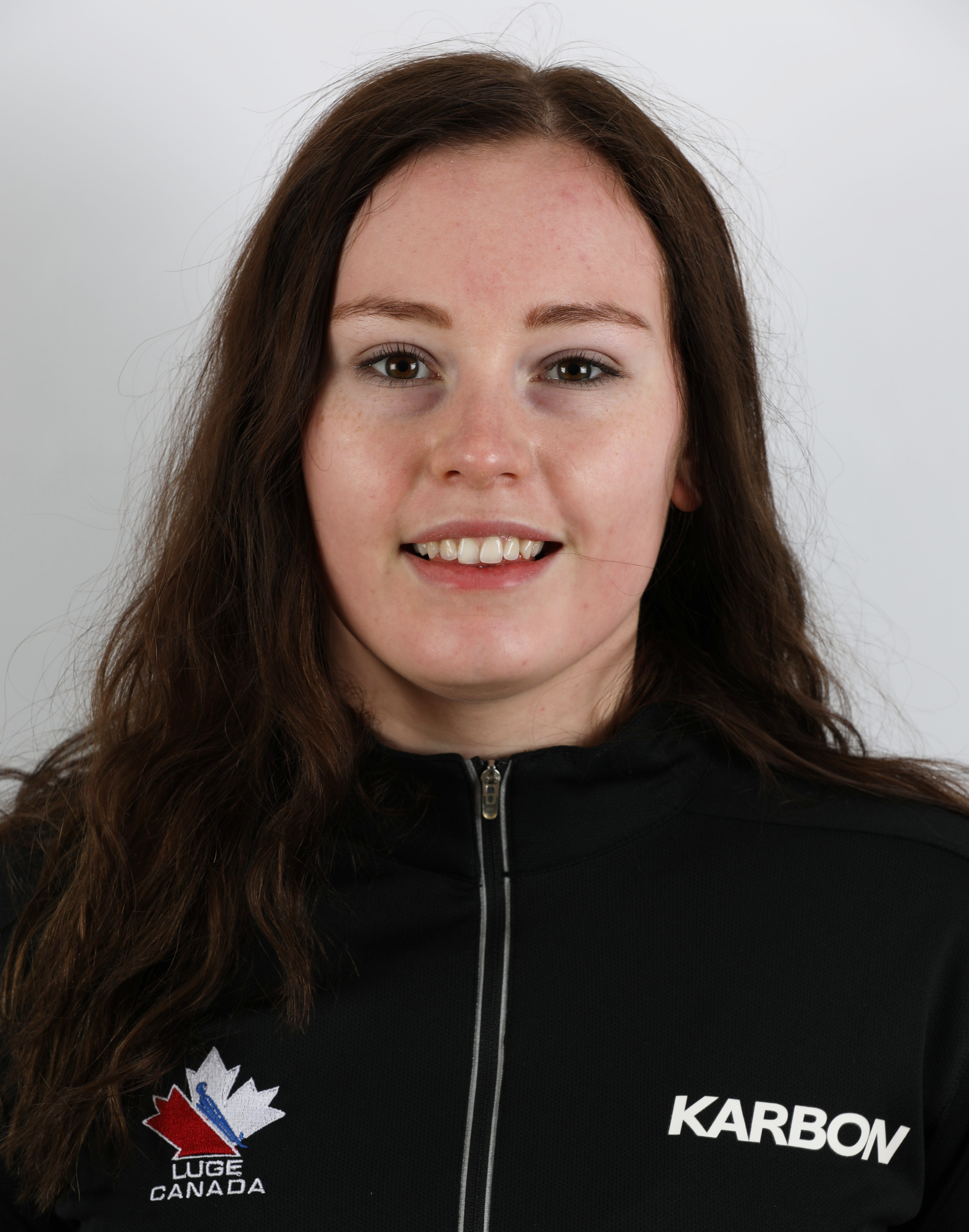
- Hodgson in November 2018

Personal information
- Born: 27 July 2000 (age 25) Calgary, Alberta, Canada
- Height: 167 cm (5 ft 6 in)

Sport
- Country: Canada
- Sport: Luge
Medal record
America-Pacific Luge Championship
Bronze medal – third place	2019 Whistler	Women's singles

Makena Hodgson (born 27 July 2000) is a Canadian luger.

== Career ==
In 2019–20, Hodgson became a full-time member of the Canadian World Cup team. Hodgson's best performance was a 14th-place finish in December 2019.

In December 2020, Hodgson won her first National title.

In January 2022, Hodgson was named to Canada's 2022 Olympic team.
