= Beattie Podulsky =

Canadian luger (born 2005)

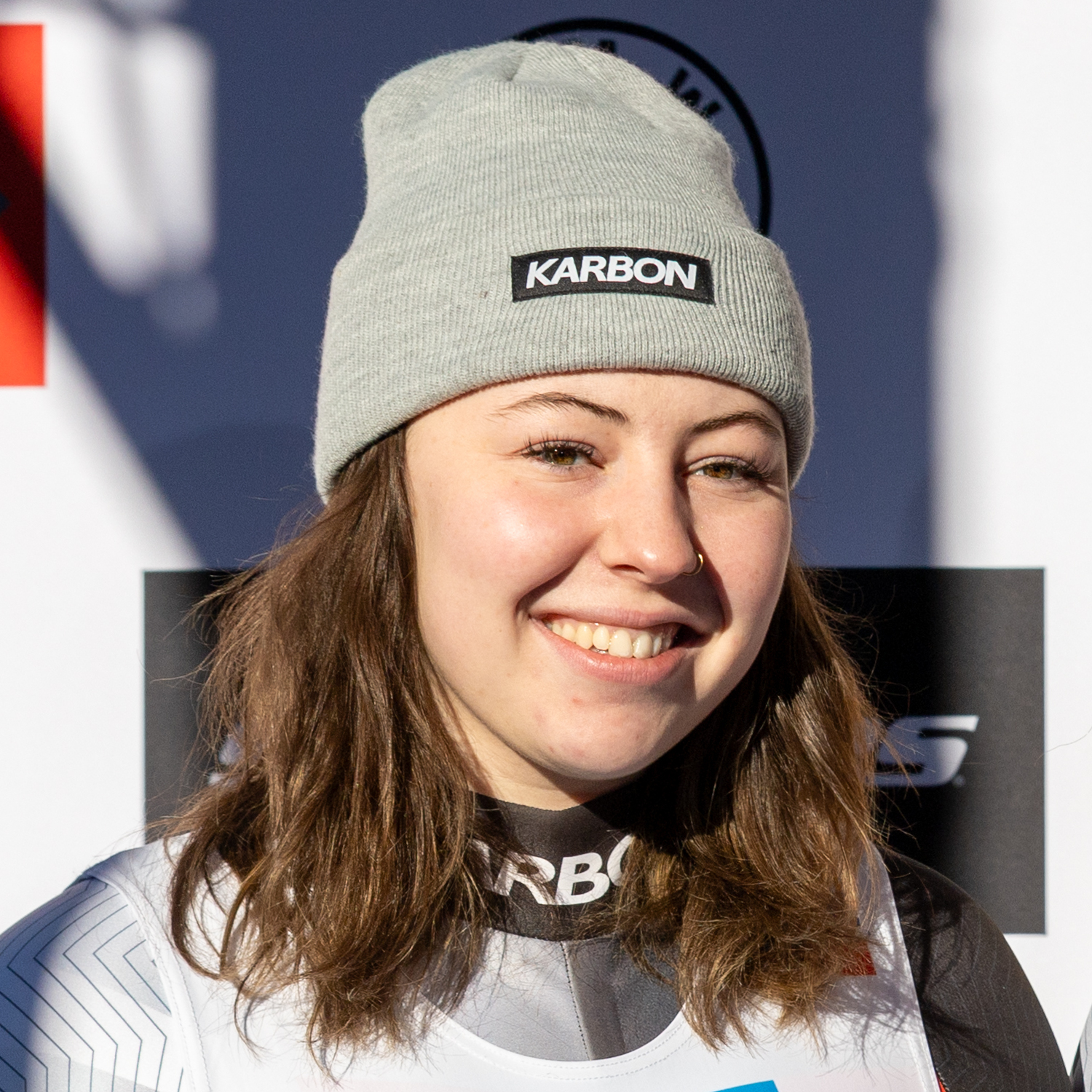
- Podulsky in 2026

Personal information
- Nationality: Canadian
- Born: 18 August 2005 (age 20) Calgary, Alberta, Canada

Sport
- Country: Canada
- Sport: Luge
Medal record
Women's luge
Representing Canada
FIL World Luge Championships
Bronze medal – third place	2025 Whistler	Team relay
America-Pacific Championship
Bronze medal – third place	2025 Lake Placid	Doubles

Beattie Podulsky (born August 18, 2005) is a Canadian luger. Podulsky primarily competes in the doubles event.

== Career ==
Podulsky along with partner Kailey Allan won bronze in the women's doubles at the 2025 America-Pacific Championship in Lake Placid, United States.

Podulsky along with Allan won bronze as part of the team relay event at the 2025 World Championships held in Whistler, Canada.

During the 2025–26 Luge World Cup, Podulsky and Allen finished a career best fifth at the World Cup stop in Winterberg, Germany.
