= Michał Gancarczyk =

Polish luger (born 2006)

- Gancarczyk in 2026

Personal information
- Nationality: Polish
- Born: 8 March 2006 (age 20)
- Home town: Jelenia Góra, Poland

Sport
- Partner: Wojciech Chmielewski

Michał Gancarczyk (born 18 March 2006, in Jelenia Góra) is a Polish luger. He competed in the men's doubles event at 2026 Winter Olympic Games.

== Luge results ==
Games	Event	With	Rank	Run 1	Run 2	Total
(Italy) 2026 Milano Cortina	Men's doubles	Wojciech Chmielewski	13th	53.000	53.246	1:46.246
(Italy) 2026 Milano Cortina	Team Relay					
