= Embyr-Lee Susko =

Canadian luger (born 2005)

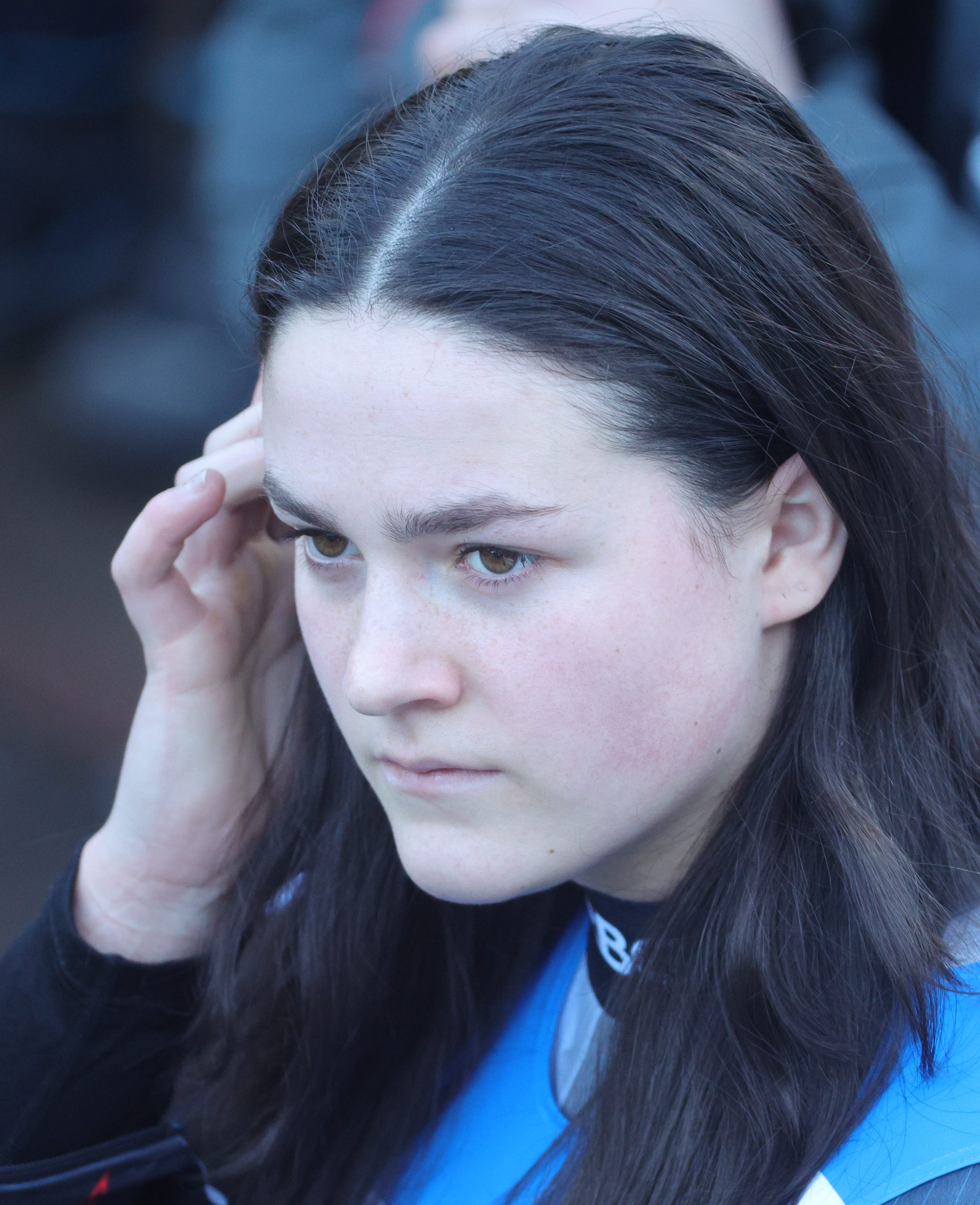
- Susko in 2024

Personal information
- Nationality: Canadian
- Born: 13 June 2005 (age 21) Whistler, British Columbia, Canada
- Website: EmbyrSusko.ca

Sport
- Country: Canada
- Sport: Luge
Medal record
Women's luge
Representing Canada
FIL World Luge Championships
Bronze medal – third place	2025 Whistler	Team relay
America-Pacific Championship
Bronze medal – third place	2023 Whistler	Singles
Junior World Luge Championships
Silver medal – second place	2024 Lillehammer	Singles

Embyr-Lee Susko (born June 13, 2005), also known as Embyr Susko, is a Canadian luger. Susko primarily competes in the singles event.

== Career ==
Susko broke onto the international stage with a bronze medal at the 2023 America-Pacific Championship in Whistler, British Columbia. Still a junior, Susko would win silver in the women's singles event at the 2024 World Junior Championships in Lillehammer, Norway.

Susko won bronze as part of the team relay event at the 2025 World Championships held in Whistler, Canada. Susko also finished fourth in the women's singles event.

== Personal life ==
Susko is of Slovak ethnic background through her grandfather, who hailed from Vydraň - a borough of Medzilaborce - in present-day eastern Slovakia.
