= Kailey Allan =

Canadian luger (born 2003)

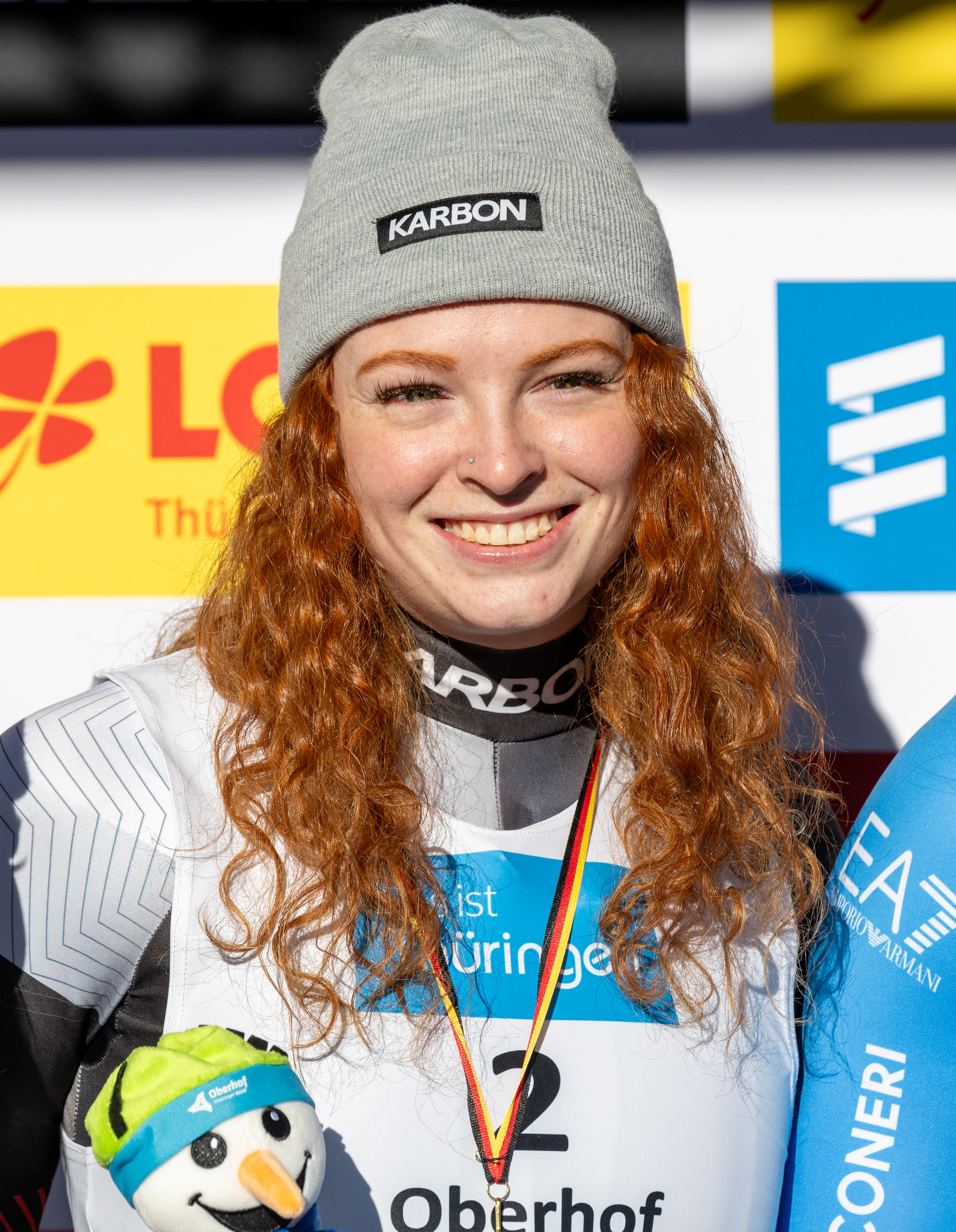
- Allan in 2026

Personal information
- Nationality: Canadian
- Born: 17 June 2003 (age 23) Calgary, Alberta, Canada

Sport
- Country: Canada
- Sport: Luge
Medal record
Women's luge
Representing Canada
FIL World Luge Championships
Bronze medal – third place	2025 Whistler	Team relay
America-Pacific Championship
Bronze medal – third place	2025 Lake Placid	Doubles

Kailey Allan (born June 17, 2003) is a Canadian luger. Allan primarily competes in the doubles event.

== Career ==
Allan first represented Canada on the international stage by competing at the 2020 Winter Youth Olympics. Allan along with partner Beattie Podulsky won bronze in the women's doubles at the 2025 America-Pacific Championship in Lake Placid, United States.

Allan along with Podulsky won bronze as part of the team relay event at the 2025 World Championships held in Whistler, Canada.

During the 2025–26 Luge World Cup, Allan and Podulsky finished a career best fifth at the World Cup stop in Winterberg, Germany.

Allan also competed at Milano Cortina 2026, where Allan and Podulsky placed 10th. This marked her Olympic Games debut and her second Olympic appearance overall.
