= Wolfgang Kindl =

Austrian luger (born 1988)

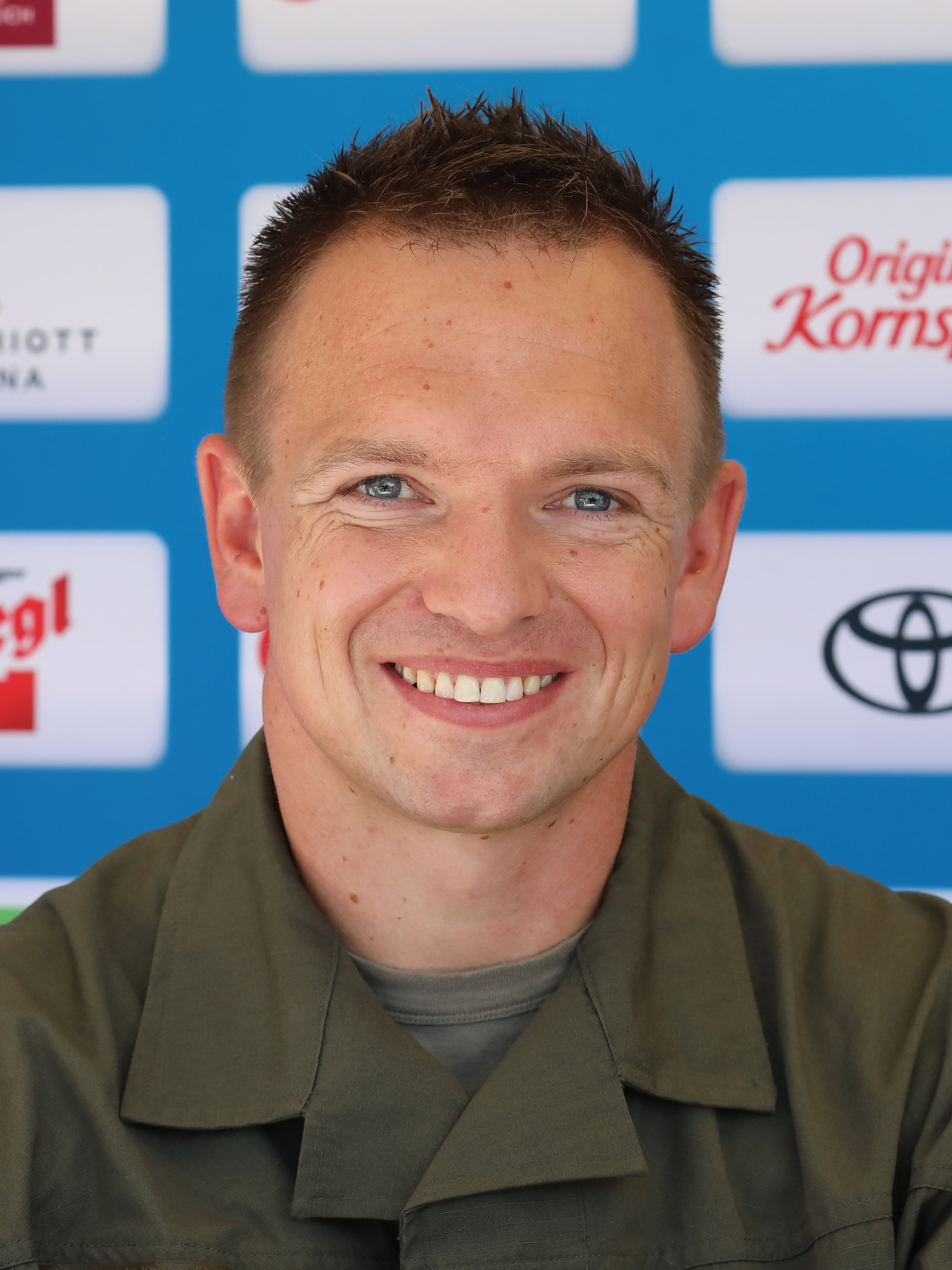
- Wolfgang Kindl in 2024

Personal information
- Born: 18 April 1988 (age 38) Innsbruck, Austria
- Height: 1.66 m (5 ft 5 in)
- Weight: 78 kg (172 lb)

Sport
- Country: Austria
- Sport: Luge
- Event: Singles/Doubles
Medal record
Men's luge
Representing Austria
Olympic Games
Silver medal – second place	2022 Beijing	Singles
Silver medal – second place	2022 Beijing	Team relay
Silver medal – second place	2026 Milano Cortina	Doubles
Silver medal – second place	2026 Milano Cortina	Team relay
World Championships
Gold medal – first place	2017 Igls	Singles
Gold medal – first place	2017 Igls	Singles Sprint
Gold medal – first place	2025 Whistler	Mixed doubles
Silver medal – second place	2024 Alternberg	Doubles
Silver medal – second place	2024 Alternberg	Doubles Sprint
Silver medal – second place	2025 Whistler	Team relay
Bronze medal – third place	2015 Sigulda	Singles
Bronze medal – third place	2016 Königssee	Singles
Bronze medal – third place	2020 Sochi	Singles
European Championships
Gold medal – first place	2022 St. Moritz	Singles
Gold medal – first place	2024 Igls	Doubles
Gold medal – first place	2024 Igls	Team relay
Gold medal – first place	2026 Oberhof	Mixed doubles
Silver medal – second place	2010 Sigulda	Singles
Silver medal – second place	2010 Sigulda	Team relay
Silver medal – second place	2017 Königssee	Team relay
Bronze medal – third place	2017 Königssee	Singles

Wolfgang Kindl (born 18 April 1988) is an Austrian world champion luger who has competed since 2007. He is a four-time Winter Olympic silver medalist, three-time World Championships gold medalist, and four-time European Championships gold medalist.

== Competitive career ==
At the FIL European Luge Championships 2010 in Sigulda, he won silver medals in the men's singles and mixed team events. At the 5 December 2014 men's singles event in Lake Placid, New York, Kindl placed second, behind American Tucker West, with Dominik Fischnaller of Italy coming in third. Kindl finished the 2014-15 Luge World Cup third overall in the men's singles discipline. During the following 2015-16 Luge World Cup season, Kindl finished 2nd in the men's singles category. behind Felix Loch of Germany. In the 2016–17 Luge World Cup campaign Kindl finished third behind respectively, the repeating world champion, Felix Loch, and Roman Repilov of Russia. The next year was Kindl's best Luge World Cup season finish so far as he finished as the champion in men's spring singles event for the 2017–18 and also placed second in the men's singles event standings.

Kindl represented Austria at the 2010 Winter Olympics in Vancouver, British Columbia, Canada, finishing ninth in the men's singles. Kindl reprised representing Austria in the 2014 Winter Olympics held in Sochi, Russia and again finished ninth in the men's singles event. At the 2018 Winter Olympics staged in PyeongChang, South Korea Kindl represented Austria for the third time and again finished ninth in the men's singles event for the third consecutive time. Kindl at last obtained an Olympic medal when he won silver in the singles event in the 2022 Beijing games. Kindl finished behind only German Johannes Ludwig.

Kindl qualified for the 2026 Olympics both in singles and doubles. He won a silver medal in the doubles event, along with Thomas Steu.
