= Trinity Ellis =

Canadian luger (born 2002)

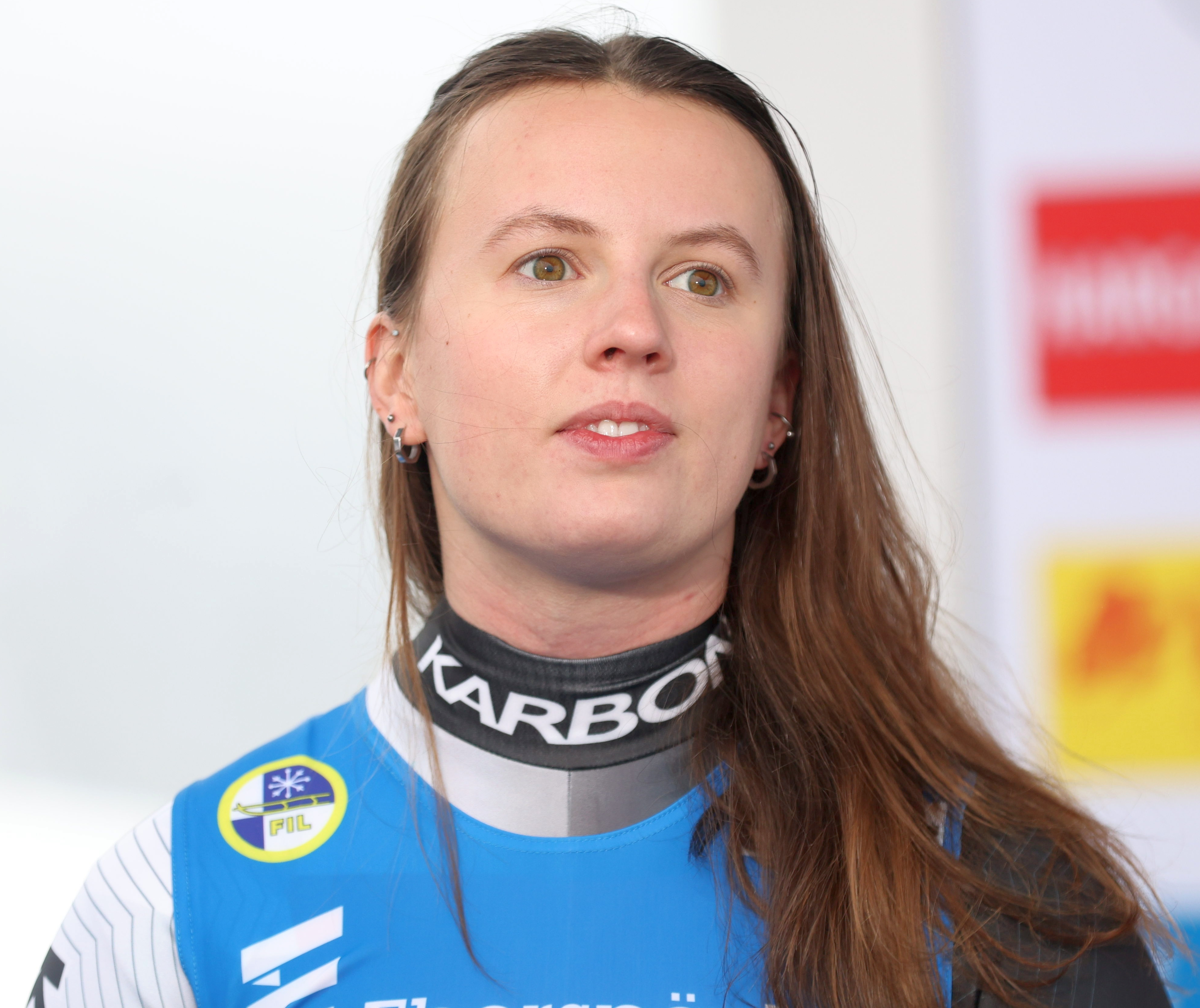
- Ellis in 2024

Personal information
- Nationality: Canadian
- Born: 28 April 2002 (age 24) Vancouver, British Columbia, Canada
- Height: 182 cm (6 ft 0 in)

Sport
- Country: Canada
- Sport: Luge
Medal record
America-Pacific Championship
Bronze medal – third place	2021 Sochi	Women's singles

Trinity Ellis (born 28 April 2002), Métis is a Canadian luger.

== Career ==
In January 2019, Ellis competed at her first Senior World Championships, finishing in 29th. In November 2019, Ellis had a top 10 finish on the World Cup Circuit.

In January 2022, Ellis was named to Canada's 2022 Olympic team. She participated in the 2026 Olympics for Canada.
