= Ansel Haugsjaa =

American luger (born 2004)

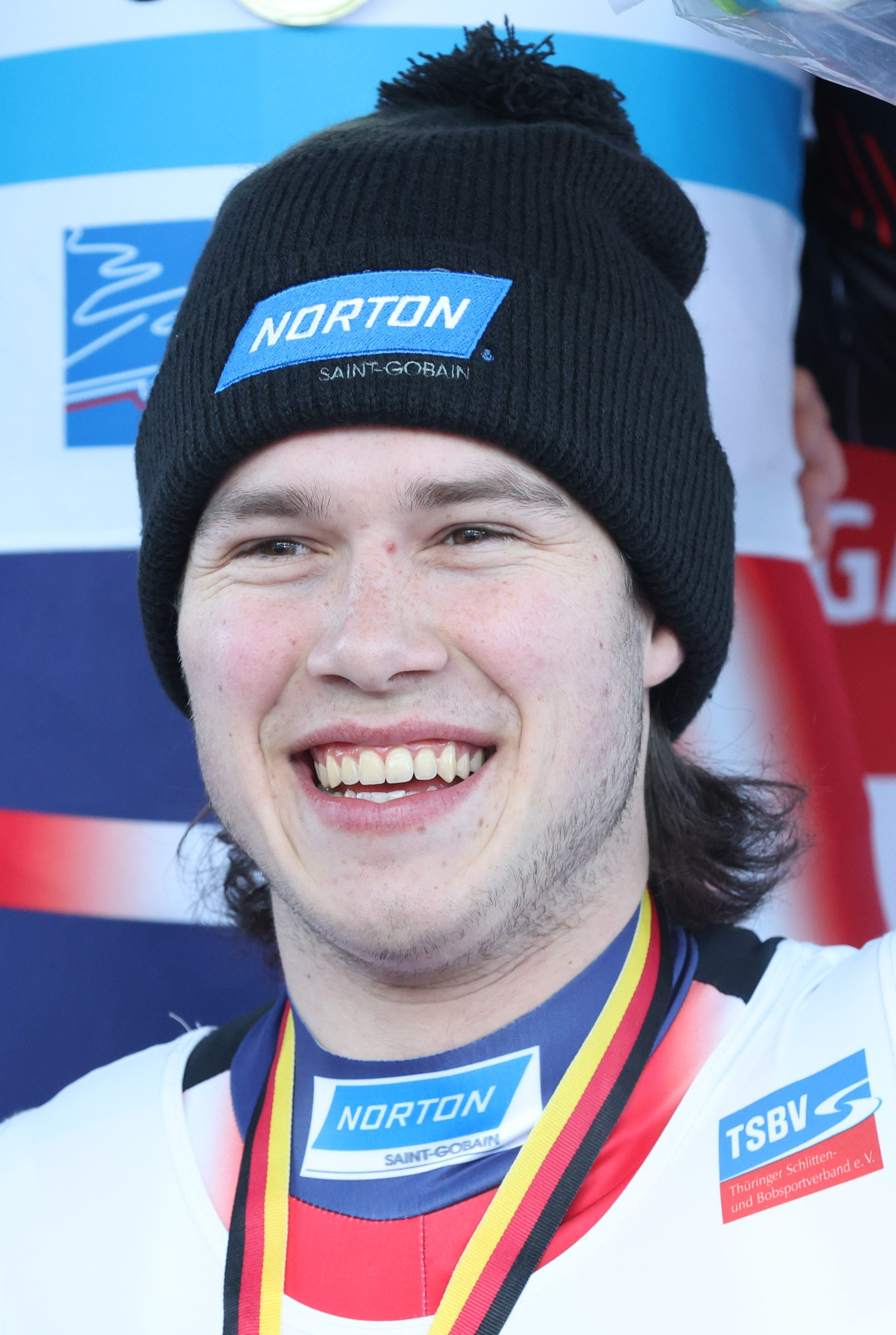
- Haugsjaa in 2024

Personal information
- Born: September 22, 2004 (age 21) Framingham, Massachusetts, U.S.

Sport
- Sport: Luge
- Event: Doubles
Medal record
Men's luge
Representing the United States
America-Pacific Championship
Gold medal – first place	2025 Lake Placid	Doubles
Bronze medal – third place	2023 Whistler	Doubles
Junior World Championships
Gold medal – first place	2024 Lillehammer	Doubles
Bronze medal – third place	2023 Bludenz	Doubles

Ansel Haugsjaa (born September 22, 2004) is an American luger.

== Career ==
Haugsjaa competed at the 2023 Junior World Luge Championships and won a bronze medal in the doubles event, along with Marcus Mueller. The next year they won a gold medal in the doubles event.

He competed at the 2025 FIL World Luge Championships and finished in fourth place in the team relay with a time of 2:51.954. He then competed at the 2025 America-Pacific Luge Championship and won a gold medal in the doubles event, along with Mueller. On November 29, 2025, during an Olympic test event, he finished in second place in the doubles event. During the 2025–26 Luge World Cup, on December 20, 2025, he earned his first career Luge World Cup gold medal in the doubles event, with a time of 1:27.509.

In January 2026, he was selected to represent the United States at the 2026 Winter Olympics. He competed in the doubles event, along with Mueller. During their first run they set a track record with a time of 52.482, and held the lead by 0.003 seconds. During their final run they were over a tenth of a second ahead of the field before a blip in the final corners added two tenths to their time and they finished in sixth place.
