= Yannick Müller =

Austrian luger (born 1999)

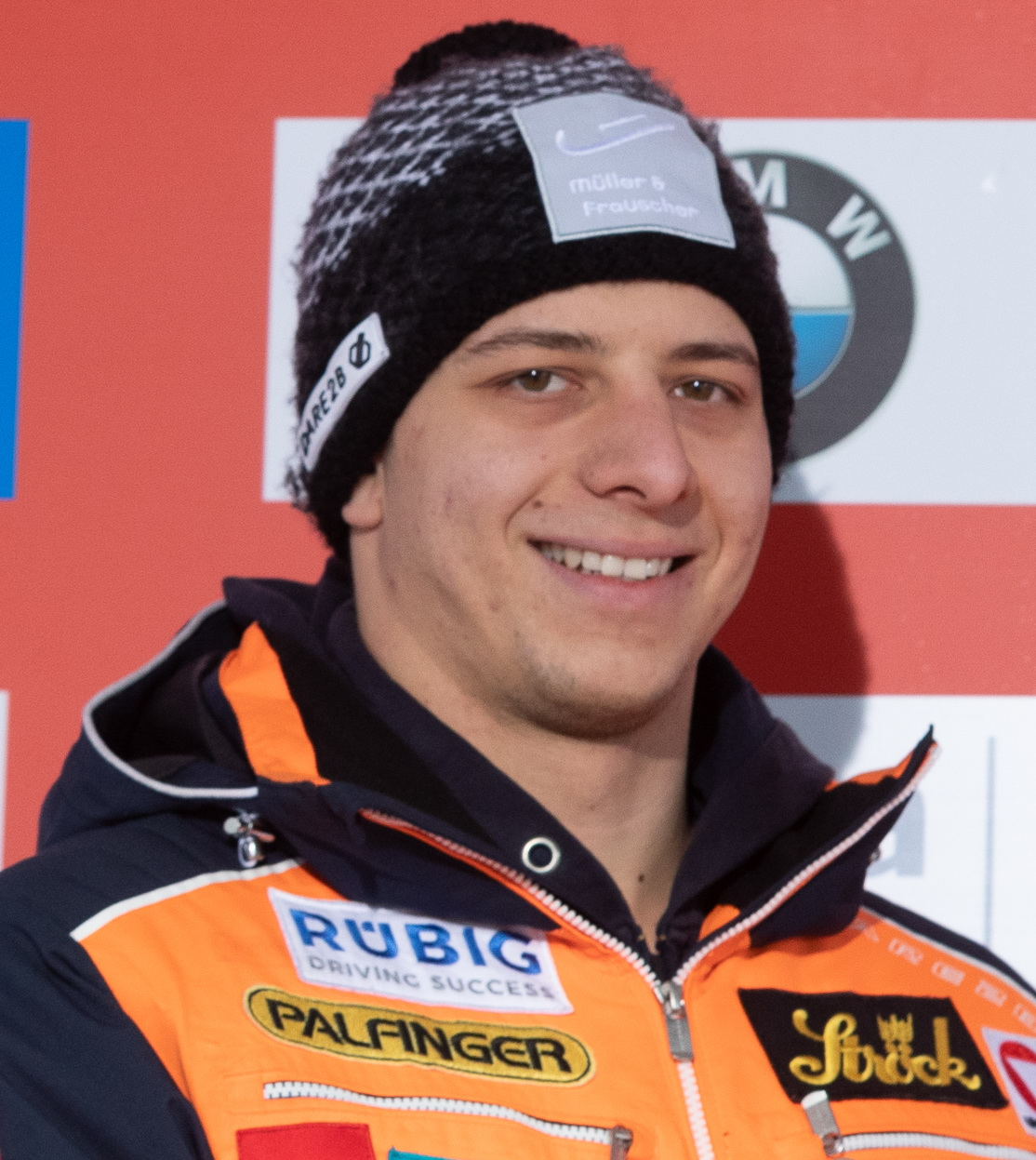

Medal record

Men's luge

Representing Austria

World Championships
Silver medal – second place	2023 Oberhof	Team relay
Bronze medal – third place	2023 Oberhof	Doubles
Bronze medal – third place	2023 Oberhof	Doubles' sprint

European Championships
Bronze medal – third place	2025 Winterberg	Doubles

Yannick Müller (born 12 August 1999) is an Austrian luger.

He started competing for the Austria national luge youth teams in the various youth categories in the singles specialty without achieving any significant results, but came close to the podium at the European Junior Championships in Sankt Moritz 2019, and finished fifth in the final standings of the World Cup junior in 2017/18.

For the 2018-19 Luge World Cup season Müller formed a team with countryman Armin Frauscher and the duo competed for the first time in the two man luge event with the new team finishing in third place in Viessmann World Cup Nationcup Men's Singles race. In 2019-20 Luge World Cup campaign the Frauscher-Mueller pairing finished 16th in the overall world cup doubles tally and 6th at the Nationcup.

He has an older brother, Jonas, who is also a sledder and a specialist in the singles.
