= Armin Frauscher =

Austrian luger (born 1994)

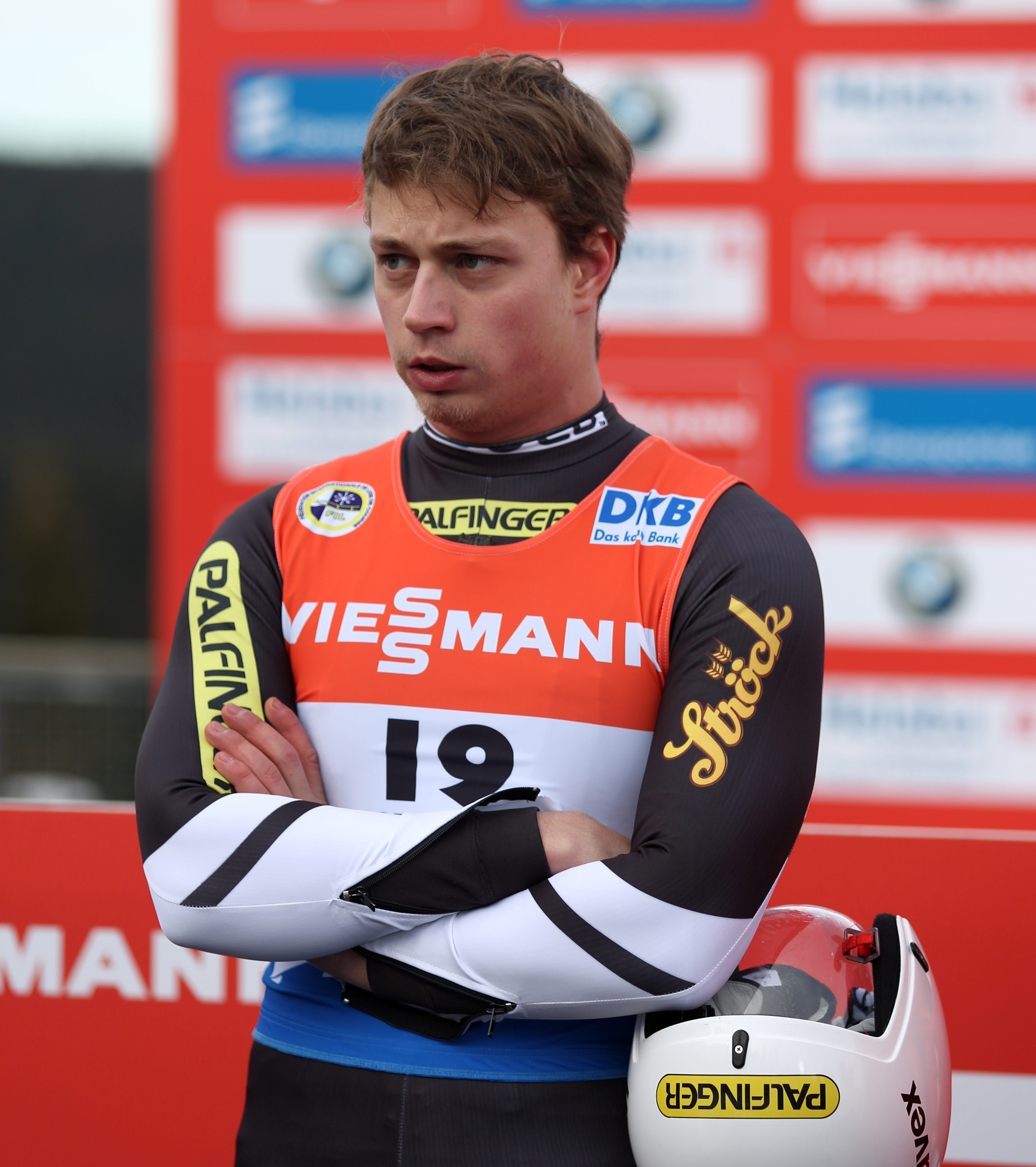
- Frauscher in 2017

Personal information
- Born: 22 March 1994 (age 32) Innsbruck, Austria

Sport
- Country: Austria
- Sport: Luge
- Event: Men's singles
Medal record
Men's luge
Representing Austria
World Championships
Silver medal – second place	2023 Oberhof	Team relay
Bronze medal – third place	2023 Oberhof	Doubles
Bronze medal – third place	2023 Oberhof	Doubles' sprint
European Championships
Bronze medal – third place	2025 Winterberg	Doubles

Armin Frauscher (born 22 March 1994) is an Austrian luger. He finished ninth competing for Austria in the boys' singles event at the 2012 Youth Winter Olympics, held in his birthplace of Innsbruck. Frauscher finished second in the opening men's singles event of the 2015-16 luge World Cup in Igls. During the 2017-18 Luge World Cup frauscher placed second in Konigssee.

For the 2018-19 Luge World Cup season Frauscher formed a team with countryman Yannick Mueller and the duo competed for the first time in the two man luge event with the new team finishing in third place in Viessmann World Cup Nationcup Men's Singles race. Meanwhile, during the same season Frauscher placed 29th in the overall men's singles discipline world cup final standings. In 2019-20 Luge World Cup campaign the Frauscher-Mueller pairing finished 16th in the overall world cup doubles tally and 6th at the Nationcup. Meanwhile, Frauscher did not compete in the singles category during the 2019-20 sliding season.
