= Sean Hollander =

American luger (born 2000)

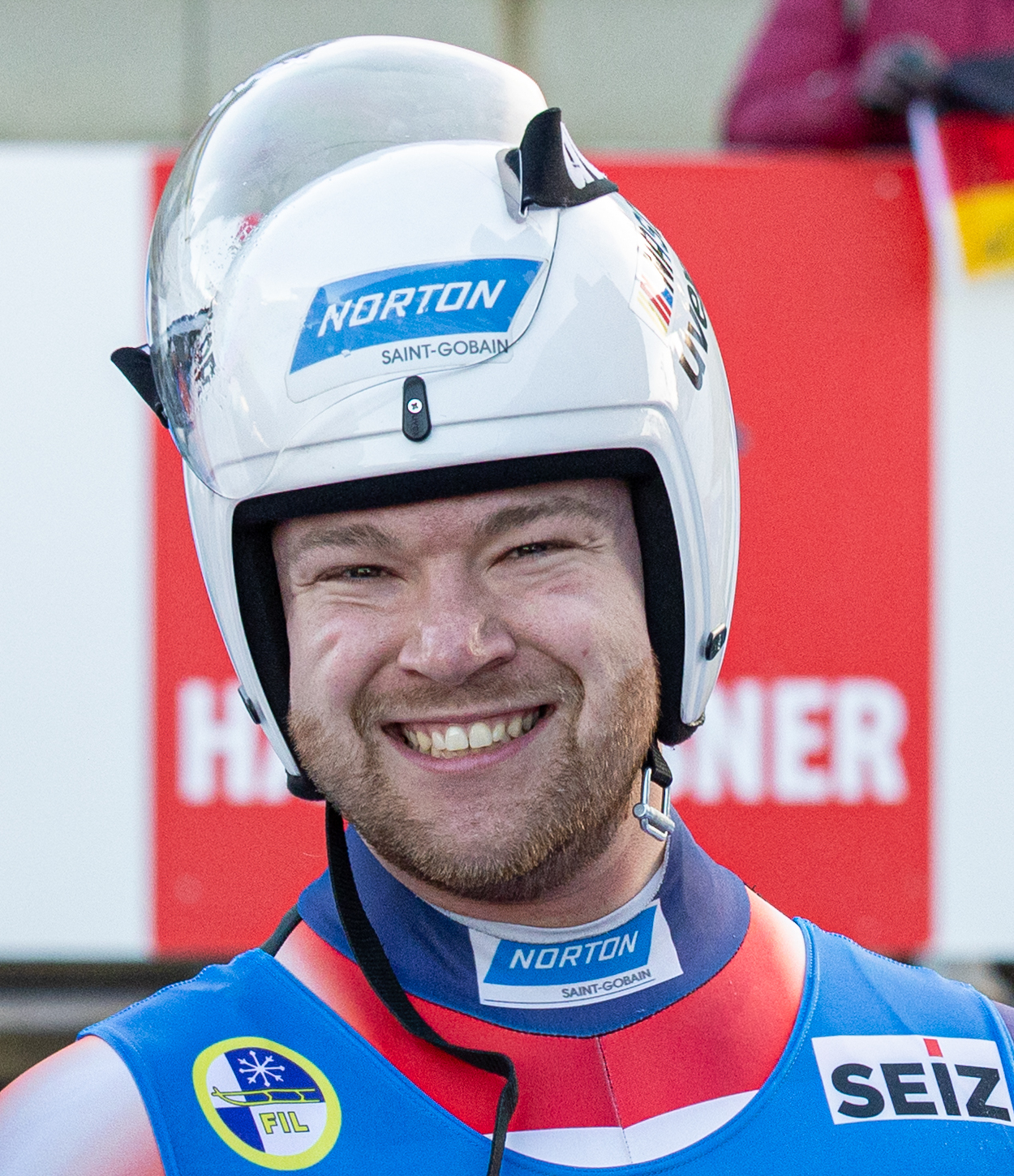
- Hollander in 2026

Personal information
- Born: February 11, 2000 (age 26)
- Home town: Lake Placid, New York, U.S.

Sport
- Sport: Luge
- Event: Doubles
Medal record
Men's luge
Representing the United States
America-Pacific Championship
Gold medal – first place	2022 Park City	Doubles
Gold medal – first place	2024 PyeongChang	Doubles
Silver medal – second place	2023 Whistler	Doubles
Silver medal – second place	2025 Lake Placid	Doubles

Sean Hollander (born February 11, 2000) is an American luger. He represented the United States at the 2022 and 2026 Winter Olympics.

== Career ==
Hollander represented the United States at the 2022 Winter Olympics. He finished in seventh place in the team relay and eleventh place in the doubles event, along with Zack DiGregorio. They were the youngest doubles team in the Olympic field.

During the 2023–24 Luge World Cup, he earned his first career Luge World Cup victory on December 8, 2023 in the doubles event, along with DiGregorio. They became the first U.S. doubles luge team to win a World Cup race since December 2005.

In February 2025, he represented the United States at the 2025 FIL World Luge Championships and finished in fourth place in the mixed doubles event. In January 2026, he was again selected to represent the United States at the 2026 Winter Olympics.

== Personal life ==
In May 2025, Hollander became engaged to Olympic ski jumper, Paige Jones. They met in Lake Placid, New York, where Hollander was training and Jones was competing in ski jumping nationals.
