= 2025 FIL World Luge Championships =

Luge event in British Columbia, Canada

- Venue: Whistler, Canada
- Dates: 6–8 February

The 2025 FIL World Luge Championships were the 53rd edition and held from 6 to 8 February 2025 at the Whistler Sliding Centre in Whistler, British Columbia, Canada.

== Schedule ==
Seven events were held.

All times are local (UTC–8).

Date	Time	Events
6 February	10:30	Mixed doubles
6 February	11:45	Mixed singles
7 February	14:01	Men's doubles 1st run
7 February	14:46	Women's doubles 1st run
7 February	15:42	Men's doubles 2nd run
7 February	16:20	Women's doubles 2nd run
7 February	17:20	Women's 1st run
7 February	18:55	Women's 2nd run
8 February	13:45	Men's 1st run
8 February	15:20	Men's 2nd run
8 February	17:00	Team relay

== Medal summary ==
=== Medal table ===
* Host nation (Canada)

Rank	Nation	Gold	Silver	Bronze	Total
1	Germany	5	4	3	12
2	Austria	2	1	2	5
3	United States	0	1	1	2
4	Latvia	0	1	0	1
5	Canada*	0	0	1	1
Totals (5 entries)		7	7	7	21

=== Medalists ===
Event	Gold		Silver		Bronze	
Men's singles	Max Langenhan; Germany	1:39.922	Felix Loch; Germany	1:40.057	Nico Gleirscher; Austria	1:40.144
Men's doubles	Germany; Hannes Orlamünder; Paul Gubitz	1:16.538	Latvia; Mārtiņš Bots; Roberts Plūme	1:16.640	Germany; Tobias Wendl; Tobias Arlt	1:16.671
Women's singles	Julia Taubitz; Germany	1:17.206	Merle Fräbel; Germany	1:17.247	Emily Sweeney; United States	1:17.249
Women's doubles	Austria; Selina Egle; Lara Kipp	1:17.724	Germany; Jessica Degenhardt; Cheyenne Rosenthal	1:17.753	Germany; Dajana Eitberger; Magdalena Matschina	1:17.784
Mixed singles	Germany; Max Langenhan; Julia Taubitz	1:22.354	United States; Jonathan Gustafson; Emily Sweeney	1:22.449	Austria; David Gleirscher; Madeleine Egle	1:22.678
Mixed doubles	Austria; Thomas Steu; Wolfgang Kindl; Selina Egle; Lara Kipp	1:22.894	Germany; Hannes Orlamünder; Paul Gubitz; Dajana Eitberger; Magdalena Matschina	1:22.912	Germany; Tobias Wendl; Tobias Arlt; Jessica Degenhardt; Cheyenne Rosenthal	1:22.991
Team relay	Germany; Julia Taubitz; Hannes Orlamünder; Paul Gubitz; Max Langenhan; Jessica Degenhardt; Cheyenne Rosenthal	2:50.361	Austria; Madeleine Egle; Thomas Steu; Wolfgang Kindl; Nico Gleirscher; Selina Egle; Lara Kipp	2:50.492	Canada; Embyr-Lee Susko; Devin Wardrope; Cole Zajanski; Theo Downey; Beattie Podulsky; Kailey Allan	2:51.641
