= Devin Wardrope =

Canadian luger (born 2002)

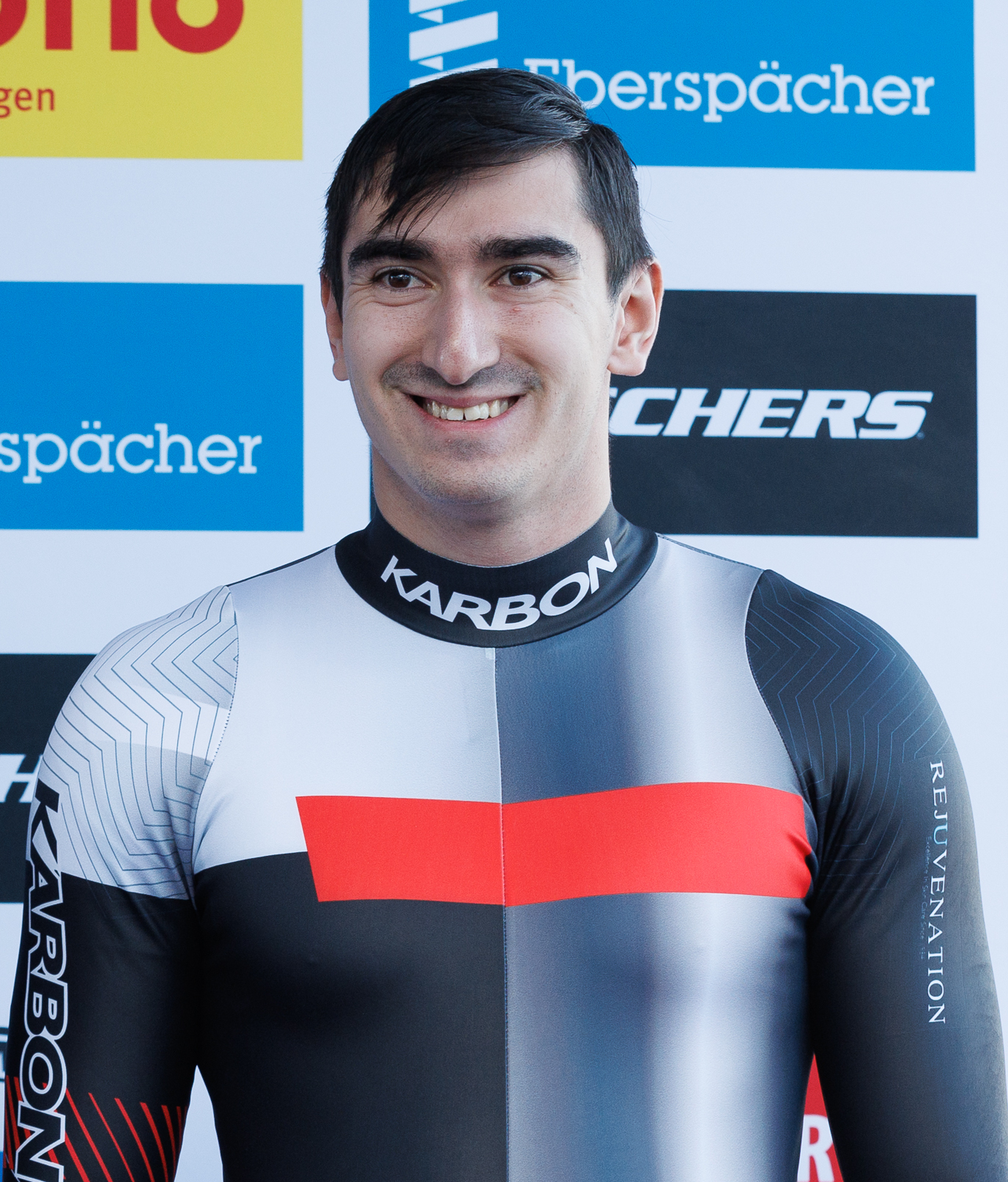
- Wardrope in 2024

Personal information
- Nationality: Canadian
- Born: 9 August 2002 (age 23) Calgary, Alberta, Canada

Sport
- Country: Canada
- Sport: Luge
Medal record
Men's luge
Representing Canada
FIL World Luge Championships
Bronze medal – third place	2025 Whistler	Team relay
America-Pacific Championship
Gold medal – first place	2023 Whistler	Doubles
Bronze medal – third place	2022 Park City	Doubles
Bronze medal – third place	2021 Sochi	Doubles

Devin Wardrope (born August 9, 2002) is a Canadian luger. Wardrope primarily competes in the doubles event.

== Career ==
Wardrope along with partner Cole Zajanski have won three medals at the America-Pacific Championship. The pair picked up bronze medals at the 2021 and 2022 editions, and gold at the 2023 edition. Wardrope and Zajanski's best placement on the World Cup placement happened in 2023, when they finished fourth in a World Cup stop in Whistler.

Wardrope along with Zajanski won bronze as part of the team relay event at the 2025 World Championships held in Whistler, Canada.
