= Cole Zajanski =

Canadian luger (born 2001)

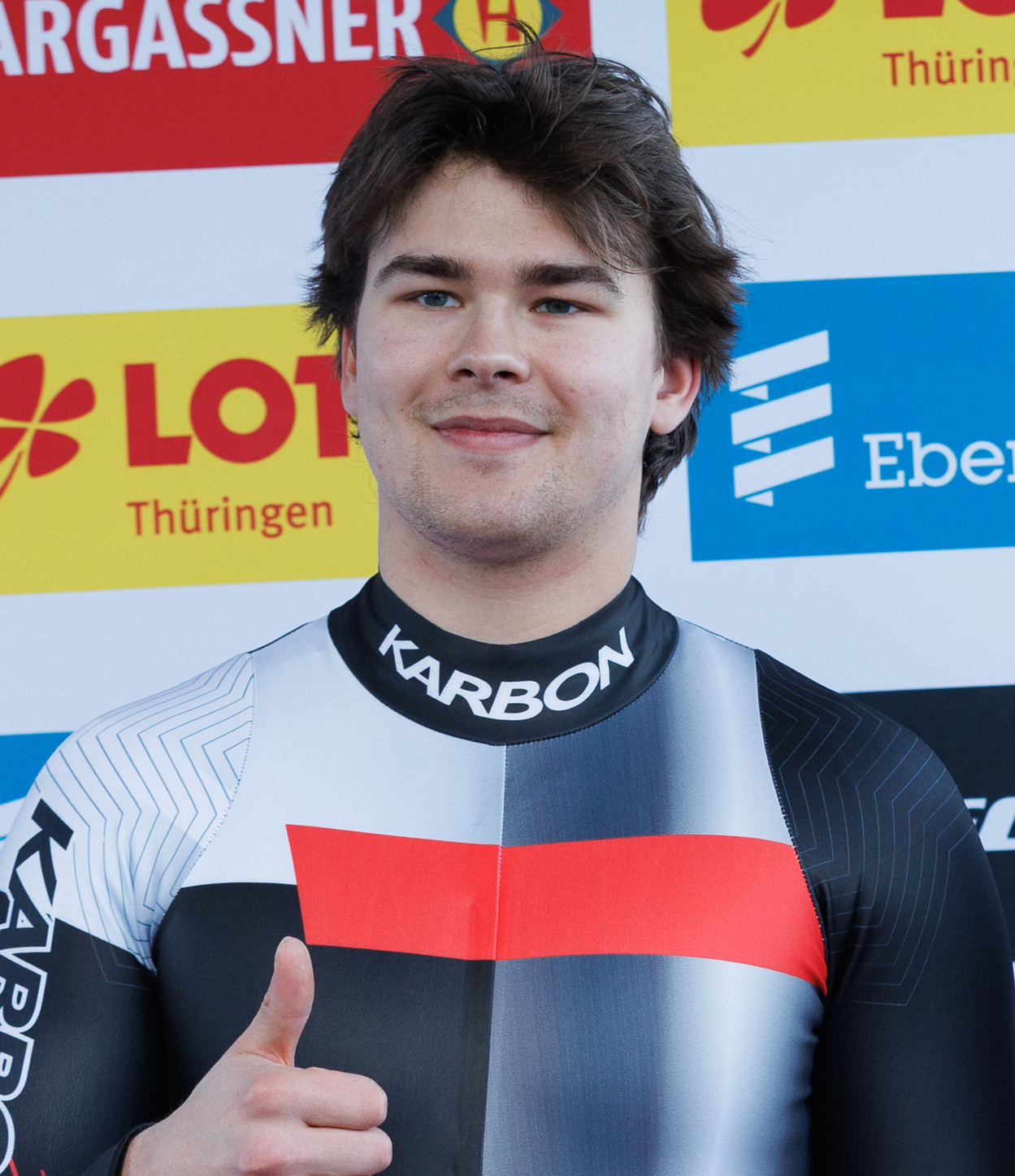
- Zajanski in 2024

Personal information
- Nationality: Canadian
- Born: 19 September 2001 (age 24) Calgary, Alberta, Canada

Sport
- Country: Canada
- Sport: Luge
Medal record
Men's luge
Representing Canada
FIL World Luge Championships
Bronze medal – third place	2025 Whistler	Team relay
America-Pacific Championship
Gold medal – first place	2023 Whistler	Doubles
Bronze medal – third place	2022 Park City	Doubles
Bronze medal – third place	2021 Sochi	Doubles

Cole Anthony Zajanski (born September 19, 2001) is a Canadian luger. Zajanski primarily competes in the doubles event.

== Career ==
Zajanski along with partner Devin Wardrope have won three medals at the America-Pacific Championship. The pair picked up bronze medals at the 2021 and 2022 editions, and gold at the 2023 edition. Zajanski and Zajanski's best placement on the World Cup placement happened in 2023, when they finished fourth in a World Cup stop in Whistler.

Zajanski along with Wardrope won bronze as part of the team relay event at the 2025 World Championships held in Whistler, Canada.
