= Wojciech Chmielewski =

Polish luger (born 1995)

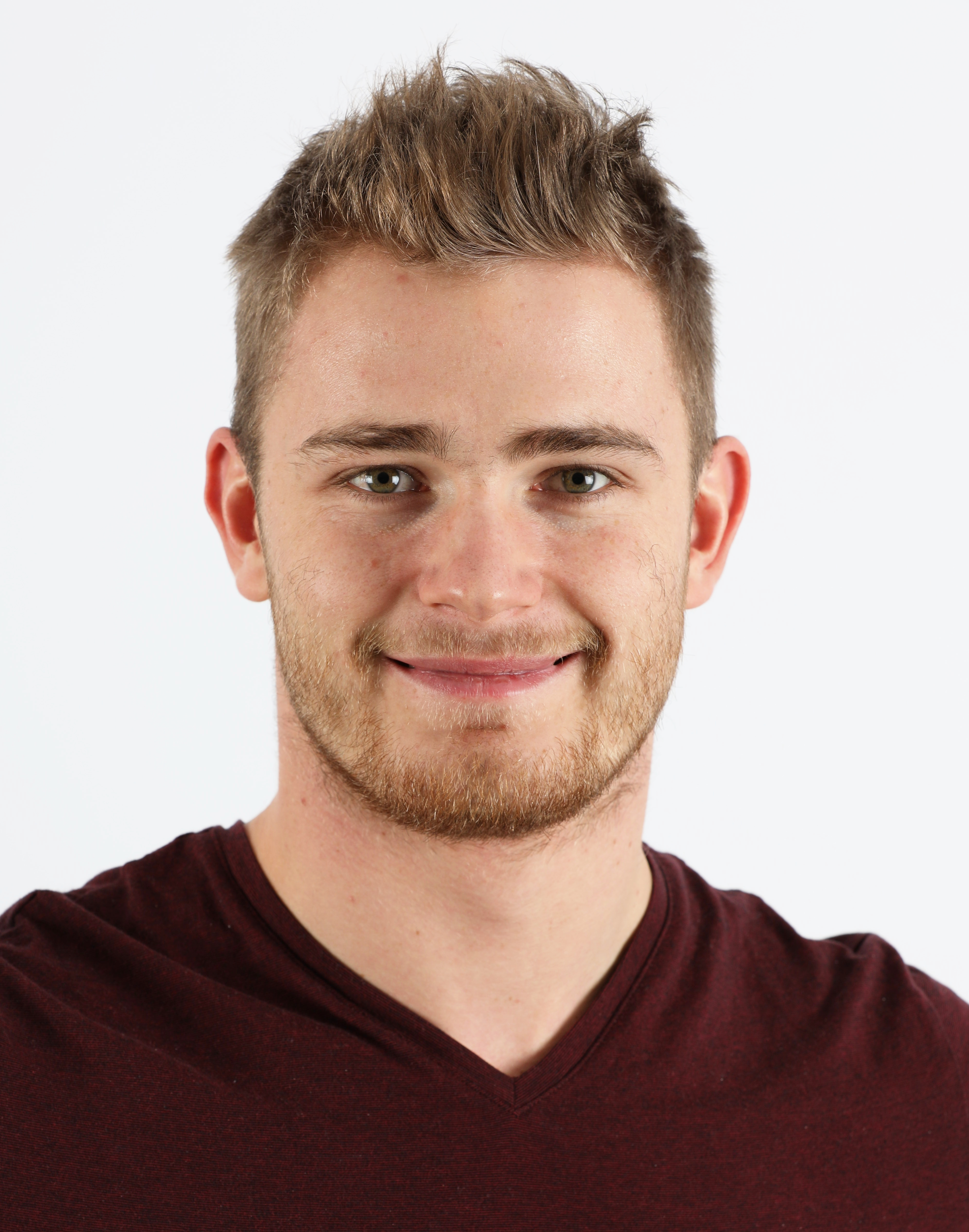
- Chmielewski in 2018

Personal information
- Nationality: Polish
- Born: 13 April 1995 (age 31) Kowary, Poland

Sport
- Sport: Luge

Wojciech Chmielewski (born 13 April 1995) is a Polish luger. He competed in the men's doubles event at the 2018, 2022 and 2026 Winter Olympic Games.

== Luge results ==
Event	With	Men's Double	Run 1	Run 2	Total
(South Korea) 2018 Pyeongchang	Jakub Kowalewski	12th	46.609	46.478	1:33.087
(China) 2022 Beijing	Jakub Kowalewski	9th	58.992	59.073	1:58.065
(Italy) 2026 Milano Cortina	Michał Gancarczyk	13th	53.000	53.246	1:46.246
