= Zack DiGregorio =

American luger (born 2001)

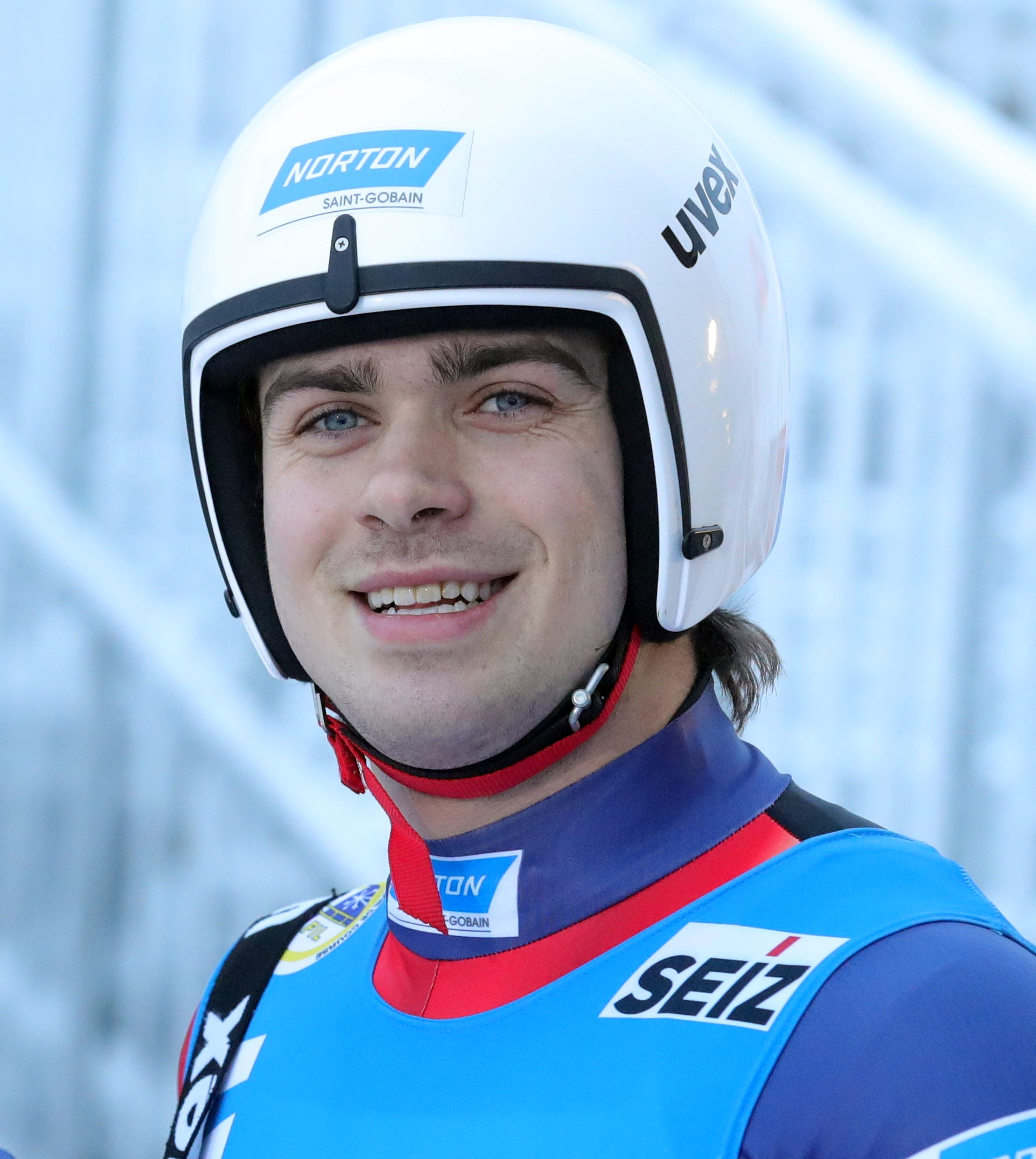
- DiGregorio in 2023

Personal information
- Full name: Zachary DiGregorio
- Nationality: American
- Born: November 14, 2001 (age 24) Massachusetts, United States

Sport
- Sport: Luge
Medal record
Luge
Representing United States
Junior World Cup
Silver medal – second place	2019–20 Altenberg	Singles

Zachary DiGregorio (born November 14, 2001) is an American luger. He competed in the doubles event and in the team relay event at the 2022 Winter Olympics, placing 11th and 7th, respectively.

== Early life ==
DiGregorio was born on November 14, 2001, and grew up in Medway, Massachusetts

== Luge career ==
When DiGregorio was ten years old, his family attended the White Castle USA Luge Slider Search event, which was being held in the nearby town Carlisle. "We got ice cream after and didn't think much of it at the time," he later said. He was later invited to the Olympic training facility in Lake Placid, New York, as the luge scouts "liked his build, speed, and strength." After tryouts there, DiGregorio was named to the U. S. Luge Junior Development Team. He later made the U. S. Junior National Luge team.

In the 2014–15 luge season, DiGregorio won a gold medal at the Norton Youth B National Championships. In the following season, he placed fifth at the Norton Youth A National Championship games. At the end of the 2016–17 season, he won the gold medal at the Norton Youth A National Championship. In 2017–18, DiGregorio competed in the Junior World Championships and was the silver medalist at the national junior championships.

DiGregorio competed at several international events in the 2018–19 season, coming in at 27th in the Junior World Championships in Austria, 10th in the singles race at the Winterberg, Germany Junior World Cup race, 13th at the Calgary, Canada singles Junior World Cup event and 6th in the singles event at the Junior World Cup in Park City, Utah.

In 2019–20, DiGregorio won the silver medal at the US National Junior Championships and won silver in the first singles event at the Junior World Cup in Germany. In January 2020, he made his debut at the World Cup in Oberhof, Germany.

In the fall of 2020, DiGregorio formed a doubles team with Sean Hollander. "The junior World Cup circuit got shut down, and the senior World Cup circuit got reduced, so Sean Hollander, now my doubles partner, we decided to try and do doubles instead of one of us going to Europe and one of us staying home," he said.

On January 7, 2022, DiGregorio and Hollander were named to the U. S. Olympic Team to participate at the 2022 Winter Olympics in Beijing, China. They competed at the doubles event, finishing in 11th place. He also participated in the team relay event, finishing in 7th place out of 14 teams.
