= Jakub Kowalewski =

Polish luger (born 1994)

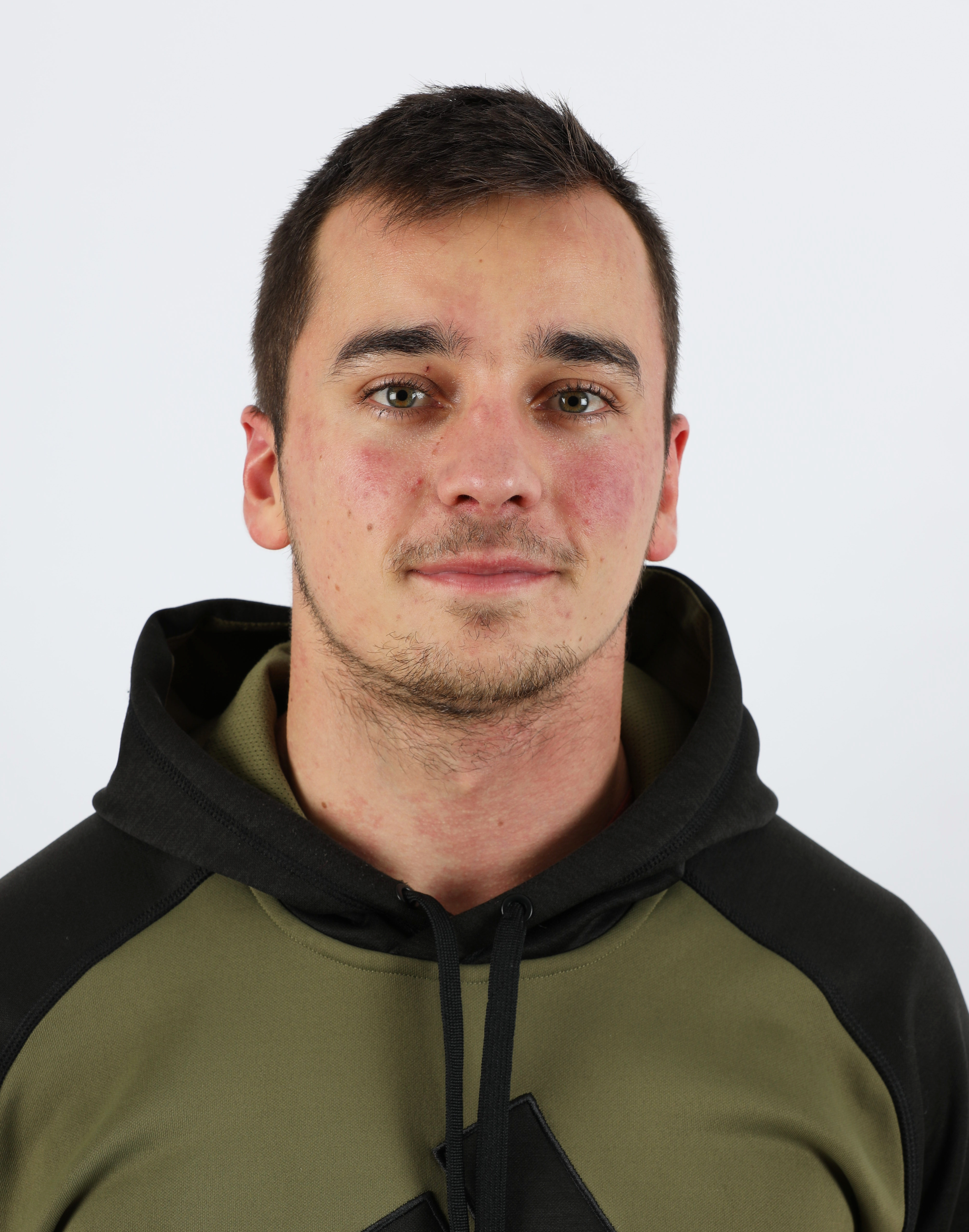
- Jakub Kowalewski (2018)

Personal information
- Nationality: Polish
- Born: 16 June 1994 (age 31) Jelenia Góra, Poland

Sport
- Sport: Luge

Jakub Kowalewski (born 16 June 1994) is a Polish luger. He competed in the men's doubles event at the 2018 Winter Olympics and in the same event at the 2022 Winter Olympics.
