= 2023 FIL European Luge Championships – Women's singles =

Women's singles at the 2023 FIL European Luge Championships
- Venue: Sigulda bobsleigh, luge, and skeleton track
- Location: Sigulda, Latvia
- Dates: 15 January
- Competitors: 20 from 10 nations
- Winning time: 1:24.600

Medalists
gold medal	Anna Berreiter	Germany
silver medal	Dajana Eitberger	Germany
bronze medal	Elīna Ieva Vītola	Latvia

The women's singles competition at the 2023 FIL European Luge Championships was held on 15 January 2023.

== Results ==
The first run was held at 10:18 and the second run at 11:45.

Rank	Bib	Name	Country	Run 1	Rank	Run 2	Rank	Total	Diff
1st place, gold medalist(s)	27	Anna Berreiter	Germany	42.546	7	42.054	2	1:24.600	
2nd place, silver medalist(s)	25	Dajana Eitberger	Germany	42.461	5	42.170	5	1:24.631	+0.031
3rd place, bronze medalist(s)	24	Elīna Ieva Vītola	Latvia	42.488	6	42.149	4	1:24.637	+0.037
4	16	Merle Fräbel	Germany	42.410	2	42.232	6	1:24.642	+0.042
5	21	Sandra Robatscher	Italy	42.441	3	42.274	8	1:24.715	+0.115
6	17	Sigita Bērziņa	Latvia	42.453	4	42.284	9	1:24.737	+0.137
7	18	Kendija Aparjode	Latvia	42.393	1	42.390	12	1:24.783	+0.183
8	28	Julia Taubitz	Germany	42.780	14	42.119	3	1:24.899	+0.299
9	26	Andrea Vötter	Italy	42.618	8	42.322	10	1:24.940	+0.340
10	22	Natalie Maag	Switzerland	42.720	12	42.269	7	1:24.989	+0.389
11	19	Lisa Schulte	Austria	42.643	9	42.356	11	1:24.999	+0.399
12	29	Madeleine Egle	Austria	43.218	19	41.868	1	1:25.086	+0.486
13	14	Marion Oberhofer	Italy	42.671	11	42.543	13	1:25.214	+0.614
14	13	Verena Hofer	Italy	42.668	10	42.620	15	1:25.288	+0.688
15	10	Olena Stetskiv	Ukraine	42.735	13	42.574	14	1:25.309	+0.709
16	8	Tove Kohala	Sweden	42.813	15	42.680	17	1:25.493	+0.893
17	11	Selina Egle	Austria	43.086	18	42.679	16	1:25.765	+1.165
18	7	Klaudia Domaradzka	Poland	42.917	16	42.923	18	1:25.840	+1.240
19	6	Katarína Šimoňáková	Slovakia	43.048	17	42.972	19	1:26.020	+1.420
20	2	Elsa Desmond	Ireland	52.779	20	43.695	20	1:36.474	+11.874
