= 2023 FIL World Luge Championships – Women's sprint =

Women's sprint at the 2023 FIL World Luge Championships
- Venue: Oberhof bobsleigh, luge, and skeleton track
- Location: Oberhof, Germany
- Date: 27 January
- Competitors: 36 from 17 nations
- Winning time: 26.204

Medalists
gold medal	Dajana Eitberger	Germany
silver medal	Julia Taubitz	Germany
bronze medal	Anna Berreiter	Germany

The women's sprint competition at the 2023 FIL World Luge Championships was held on 27 January 2023.

== Results ==
The qualification was held at 10:15 and the final at 14:21.

Rank	Bib	Name	Country	Qualification		Final	
Rank	Bib	Name	Country	Time	Rank	Time	Diff
1st place, gold medalist(s)	14	Dajana Eitberger	Germany	26.117	1	26.204	
2nd place, silver medalist(s)	13	Julia Taubitz	Germany	26.140	3	26.205	+0.001
3rd place, bronze medalist(s)	11	Anna Berreiter	Germany	26.188	4	26.232	+0.028
4	8	Merle Fräbel	Germany	26.126	2	26.248	+0.044
5	12	Madeleine Egle	Austria	26.235	6	26.302	+0.098
5	1	Lisa Schulte	Austria	26.198	5	26.302	+0.098
7	2	Kendija Aparjode	Latvia	26.362	10	26.344	+0.140
8	4	Brittney Arndt	United States	26.329	7	26.379	+0.175
9	6	Natalie Maag	Switzerland	26.367	11	26.387	+0.183
10	15	Sigita Bērziņa	Latvia	26.337	8	26.469	+0.265
11	7	Ashley Farquharson	United States	26.532	15	26.471	+0.267
12	10	Elīna Ieva Vītola	Latvia	26.397	13	26.478	+0.274
13	3	Sandra Robatscher	Italy	26.377	12	26.479	+0.275
14	17	Verena Hofer	Italy	26.510	14	26.542	+0.338
15	5	Summer Britcher	United States	26.348	9	26.767	+0.563
16	23	Tove Kohala	Sweden	26.609	16	Did not advance	
17	30	Verónica María Ravenna	Argentina	26.675	17	Did not advance	
18	19	Marion Oberhofer	Italy	26.686	18	Did not advance	
19	20	Klaudia Domaradzka	Poland	26.715	19	Did not advance	
20	18	Trinity Ellis	Canada	26.720	20	Did not advance	
21	37	Yulianna Tunytska	Ukraine	26.756	21	Did not advance	
22	22	Carolyn Maxwell	Canada	26.794	22	Did not advance	
23	21	Caitlin Nash	Canada	26.803	23	Did not advance	
24	24	Olena Stetskiv	Ukraine	26.809	24	Did not advance	
25	26	Raluca Strămăturaru	Romania	26.871	25	Did not advance	
26	36	Frančeska Bona	Latvia	26.927	26	Did not advance	
27	33	Jung Hye-sun	South Korea	26.936	27	Did not advance	
28	31	Katarína Šimoňáková	Slovakia	26.996	28	Did not advance	
29	27	Elsa Desmond	Ireland	27.009	29	Did not advance	
30	28	Natalia Jamróz	Poland	27.036	30	Did not advance	
31	25	Lin Sin-rong	Chinese Taipei	27.052	31	Did not advance	
32	35	Carmen Manolescu	Romania	27.120	32	Did not advance	
33	34	Wang Peixuan	China	27.161	33	Did not advance	
34	29	Gulijienati Adiekyoumu	China	27.473	34	Did not advance	
35	32	You Do-hee	South Korea	27.594	35	Did not advance	
	16	Hannah Prock	Austria	Disqualified		Did not advance	
	9	Andrea Vötter	Italy	Did not start			
