= 2024 FIL World Luge Championships – Women's singles =

Women's singles at the 2024 FIL World Luge Championships
- Venue: Altenberg bobsleigh, luge, and skeleton track
- Location: Altenberg, Germany
- Dates: 28 January
- Competitors: 36 from 17 nations
- Winning time: 1:43.901

Medalists
gold medal	Lisa Schulte	Austria
silver medal	Julia Taubitz	Germany
bronze medal	Madeleine Egle	Austria

The Women's singles competition at the 2024 FIL World Luge Championships was held on 28 January 2024.

== Results ==
The race was started at 10:48.

Rank	Bib	Name	Country	Run 1	Rank	Run 2	Rank	Total	Diff
1st place, gold medalist(s)	21	Lisa Schulte	Austria	52.082	1	51.819	2	1:43.901	
2nd place, silver medalist(s)	22	Julia Taubitz	Germany	52.154	2	51.851	3	1:44.005	+0.104
3rd place, bronze medalist(s)	17	Madeleine Egle	Austria	52.192	3	51.884	4	1:44.076	+0.175
4	11	Elīna Ieva Vītola	Latvia	52.246	4	51.953	5	1:44.199	+0.298
5	12	Merle Fräbel	Germany	52.439	6	51.786	1	1:44.225	+0.324
6	15	Kendija Aparjode	Latvia	52.455	8	51.958	6	1:44.413	+0.512
7	14	Natalie Maag	Switzerland	52.381	5	52.108	8	1:44.489	+0.588
8	13	Summer Britcher	United States	52.453	7	52.128	12	1:44.581	+0.680
9	2	Sandra Robatscher	Italy	52.566	11	52.092	7	1:44.658	+0.757
10	16	Hannah Prock	Austria	52.546	10	52.120	9	1:44.664	+0.763
11	9	Verena Hofer	Italy	52.606	14	52.141	13	1:44.747	+0.846
12	8	Melina Fischer	Germany	52.654	15	52.120	10	1:44.774	+0.873
13	4	Caitlin Nash	Canada	52.576	13	52.209	14	1:44.785	+0.884
14	36	Trinity Ellis	Canada	52.511	9	52.280	16	1:44.791	+0.890
15	10	Sigita Bērziņa	Latvia	52.679	17	52.124	11	1:44.803	+0.902
16	7	Embyr-Lee Susko	Canada	52.574	12	52.347	17	1:44.921	+1.020
17	6	Nina Zöggeler	Italy	52.721	18	52.383	19	1:45.104	+1.203
18	25	Barbara Allmaier	Austria	52.754	19	52.365	18	1:45.119	+1.218
19	19	Ashley Farquharson	United States	52.924	20	52.219	15	1:45.143	+1.242
20	18	Emily Sweeney	United States	52.678	16	52.502	20	1:45.180	+1.279
21	23	Klaudia Domaradzka	Poland	52.965	21	Did not advance			
22	5	Ioana Corina Buzăţoiu	Romania	53.009	22	Did not advance			
23	29	Verónica María Ravenna	Argentina	53.032	23	Did not advance			
24	20	Anna Berreiter	Germany	53.042	24	Did not advance			
25	34	Yulianna Tunytska	Ukraine	53.162	25	Did not advance			
26	24	Wang Peixuan	China	53.205	26	Did not advance			
27	3	Tove Kohala	Sweden	53.233	27	Did not advance			
28	26	Hu Huilan	China	53.316	28	Did not advance			
29	30	Jung Hye-sun	South Korea	53.390	29	Did not advance			
30	1	Frančeska Bona	Latvia	53.507	30	Did not advance			
31	28	Zhou Liangziting	China	53.536	31	Did not advance			
32	31	Anna Čežíková	Czech Republic	53.840	32	Did not advance			
33	33	Lucie Jansová	Czech Republic	54.525	33	Did not advance			
34	27	Elsa Desmond	Ireland	54.824	34	Did not advance			
35	32	Anna Shkret	Ukraine	55.175	35	Did not advance			
36	35	Tereza Nosková	Slovakia	57.185	36	Did not advance			
