= 2021 FIL World Luge Championships – Women's sprint =

Women's sprint at the 2021 FIL World Luge Championships
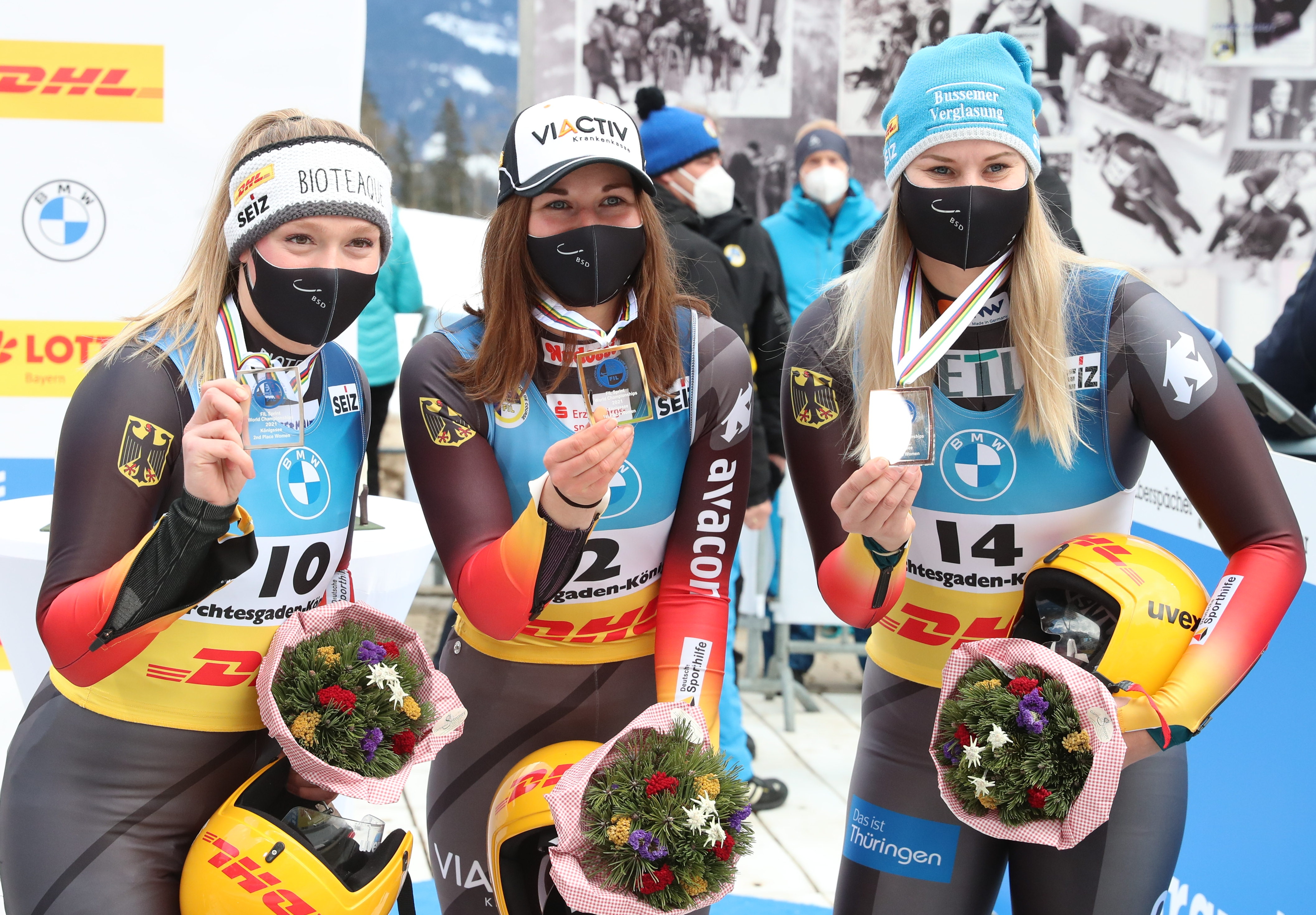
- Women's Sprint at the FIL World Luge Championships Königssee 2021 by Sandro Halank
- Venue: Königssee bobsleigh, luge, and skeleton track
- Location: Königssee, Germany
- Dates: 29 January
- Competitors: 45 from 20 nations
- Winning time: 39.101

Medalists
gold medal	Julia Taubitz	Germany
silver medal	Anna Berreiter	Germany
bronze medal	Dajana Eitberger	Germany

The women's sprint competition at the 2021 FIL World Luge Championships was held on 29 January 2021.

== Results ==
The qualification was held at 11:15 and the final at 14:31.

Rank	Bib	Name	Country	Qualification		Final	
Rank	Bib	Name	Country	Time	Rank	Time	Diff
1st place, gold medalist(s)	14	Julia Taubitz	Germany	39.825	14	39.101	
2nd place, silver medalist(s)	17	Anna Berreiter	Germany	39.619	6	39.112	+0.011
3rd place, bronze medalist(s)	13	Dajana Eitberger	Germany	39.472	2	39.300	+0.199
4	15	Natalie Geisenberger	Germany	39.488	3	39.321	+0.220
5	6	Victoria Demchenko	Russian Luge Federation	39.242	1	39.322	+0.221
6	11	Tatiana Ivanova	Russian Luge Federation	39.562	5	39.359	+0.258
7	2	Summer Britcher	United States	39.501	4	39.416	+0.315
8	5	Lisa Schulte	Austria	39.680	8	39.550	+0.449
9	12	Madeleine Egle	Austria	39.656	7	39.561	+0.460
10	16	Ulla Zirne	Latvia	39.838	15	39.601	+0.500
11	18	Ekaterina Baturina	Russian Luge Federation	39.793	13	39.632	+0.531
12	4	Hannah Prock	Austria	39.691	10	39.842	+0.741
13	7	Kendija Aparjode	Latvia	39.687	9	39.931	+0.830
14	10	Ekaterina Katnikova	Russian Luge Federation	39.755	11	40.101	+1.000
15	8	Andrea Vötter	Italy	39.762	12	40.861	+1.760
16	24	Verónica María Ravenna	Argentina	39.878	16	Did not advance	
17	9	Elīza Tīruma	Latvia	39.904	17	Did not advance	
18	3	Verena Hofer	Italy	39.925	18	Did not advance	
19	23	Marion Oberhofer	Italy	40.018	19	Did not advance	
20	20	Aileen Frisch	South Korea	40.059	20	Did not advance	
21	1	Natalie Maag	Switzerland	40.067	21	Did not advance	
22	35	Carolyn Maxwell	Canada	40.084	22	Did not advance	
23	41	Selina Egle	Austria	40.086	23	Did not advance	
24	32	Elīna Ieva Vītola	Latvia	40.114	24	Did not advance	
24	27	Emily Sweeney	United States	40.114	24	Did not advance	
26	19	Ashley Farquharson	United States	40.172	26	Did not advance	
27	25	Olena Stetskiv	Ukraine	40.244	27	Did not advance	
28	28	Raluca Strămăturaru	Romania	40.350	28	Did not advance	
29	31	Jung Hye-sun	South Korea	40.564	29	Did not advance	
30	26	Olena Smaha	Ukraine	40.643	30	Did not advance	
31	30	Tove Kohala	Sweden	40.728	31	Did not advance	
32	22	Katarína Šimoňáková	Slovakia	40.944	32	Did not advance	
33	39	Detelina Marinova	Bulgaria	41.031	33	Did not advance	
34	42	Ioana Buzățoiu	Romania	41.053	34	Did not advance	
35	21	Brittney Arndt	United States	41.070	35	Did not advance	
36	29	Klaudia Domaradzka	Poland	41.293	36	Did not advance	
37	45	Lin Sin-rong	Chinese Taipei	41.330	37	Did not advance	
38	33	Natalia Jamróz	Poland	41.403	38	Did not advance	
39	40	Cezara Curmei	Romania	41.454	39	Did not advance	
40	43	Anna Bryk	Poland	41.563	40	Did not advance	
41	34	Yulianna Tunytska	Ukraine	41.690	41	Did not advance	
42	44	Elsa Desmond	Ireland	42.156	42	Did not advance	
43	38	Daria Obratov	Netherlands	42.454	43	Did not advance	
44	36	Mihaela Manolescu	Romania	42.954	44	Did not advance	
45	37	Doina Descalui	Moldova	46.419	45	Did not advance	
