= 2023 FIL World Luge Championships – Women's singles =

Women's singles at the 2023 FIL World Luge Championships
- Venue: Oberhof bobsleigh, luge, and skeleton track
- Location: Oberhof, Germany
- Date: 28 January
- Competitors: 37 from 17 nations
- Winning time: 1:23.991

Medalists
gold medal	Anna Berreiter	Germany
silver medal	Julia Taubitz	Germany
bronze medal	Dajana Eitberger	Germany

The women's singles competition at the 2023 FIL World Luge Championships was held on 28 January 2023.

== Results ==
The first run was held at 11:48 and the second run at 13:17.

Rank	Bib	Name	Country	Run 1	Rank	Run 2	Rank	Total	Diff
1st place, gold medalist(s)	18	Anna Berreiter	Germany	41.987	1	42.004	2	1:23.991	
2nd place, silver medalist(s)	17	Julia Taubitz	Germany	42.061	2	41.988	1	1:24.049	+0.058
3rd place, bronze medalist(s)	20	Dajana Eitberger	Germany	42.084	5	42.023	3	1:24.107	+0.116
4	10	Madeleine Egle	Austria	42.063	3	42.105	4	1:24.168	+0.177
5	9	Merle Fräbel	Germany	42.078	4	42.125	5	1:24.203	+0.212
6	14	Lisa Schulte	Austria	42.222	6	42.150	6	1:24.372	+0.381
7	11	Andrea Vötter	Italy	42.237	7	42.240	7	1:24.477	+0.486
8	13	Kendija Aparjode	Latvia	42.342	10	42.310	8	1:24.652	+0.661
9	6	Hannah Prock	Austria	42.273	8	42.390	10	1:24.663	+0.672
10	15	Natalie Maag	Switzerland	42.393	12	42.316	9	1:24.709	+0.718
11	19	Elīna Ieva Vītola	Latvia	42.338	9	42.395	12	1:24.733	+0.742
12	8	Summer Britcher	United States	42.391	11	42.393	11	1:24.784	+0.793
13	21	Sigita Bērziņa	Latvia	42.413	13	42.435	14	1:24.848	+0.857
14	7	Brittney Arndt	United States	42.430	14	42.429	13	1:24.859	+0.868
15	12	Ashley Farquharson	United States	42.579	17	42.462	15	1:25.041	+1.050
16	16	Sandra Robatscher	Italy	42.569	16	42.476	16	1:25.045	+1.054
17	5	Verena Hofer	Italy	42.523	15	42.540	17	1:25.063	+1.072
18	23	Trinity Ellis	Canada	42.741	19	42.707	18	1:25.448	+1.457
19	4	Marion Oberhofer	Italy	42.762	20	42.709	19	1:25.471	+1.480
20	3	Klaudia Domaradzka	Poland	42.692	18	42.863	20	1:25.555	+1.564
21	22	Yulianna Tunytska	Ukraine	42.802	21	Did not advance			
22	27	Caitlin Nash	Canada	42.938	22	Did not advance			
23	24	Tove Kohala	Sweden	43.000	23	Did not advance			
24	30	Verónica María Ravenna	Argentina	43.036	24	Did not advance			
25	1	Frančeska Bona	Latvia	43.063	25	Did not advance			
26	26	Lin Sin-rong	Chinese Taipei	43.066	26	Did not advance			
27	29	Katarína Šimoňáková	Slovakia	43.089	27	Did not advance			
28	25	Raluca Strămăturaru	Romania	43.108	28	Did not advance			
29	28	Olena Stetskiv	Ukraine	43.111	29	Did not advance			
30	2	Carolyn Maxwell	Canada	43.139	30	Did not advance			
31	35	Carmen Manolescu	Romania	43.210	31	Did not advance			
32	31	Jung Hye-sun	South Korea	43.288	32	Did not advance			
33	34	Wang Peixuan	China	43.340	33	Did not advance			
34	33	Natalia Jamróz	Poland	43.411	34	Did not advance			
35	32	Elsa Desmond	Ireland	43.435	35	Did not advance			
36	36	You Do-hee	South Korea	43.564	36	Did not advance			
37	37	Gulijienati Adiekyoumu	China	43.840	37	Did not advance			
