= 2022–23 Luge World Cup =

2022–2023 season of the Luge World Cup

Discipline	Men	Women
Singles Overall	(Italy) Dominik Fischnaller (1)	(Germany) Julia Taubitz (3)
Singles	(Germany) Felix Loch (2)	(Germany) Julia Taubitz (1)
Singles Sprint	(Italy) Dominik Fischnaller (1)	(Germany) Julia Taubitz (4)
Doubles Overall	(Germany) Tobias Wendl / Tobias Arlt (5)	(Italy) Andrea Vötter / Marion Oberhofer (1)
Doubles	(Germany) Tobias Wendl / Tobias Arlt (1)	(Italy) Andrea Vötter / Marion Oberhofer (1)
Doubles Sprint	(Germany) Tobias Wendl / Tobias Arlt (2)	(Austria) Selina Egle / Lara Kipp (1) & (Italy) Andrea Vötter / Marion Oberhofer (1)
- Team Relay: Germany (17)

Competition
Edition	46th	46th
Locations	9	9

The 2022–23 Luge World Cup was a multi race tournament over a season for Luge, organised by the FIL. The season started on 4 December 2022 in Innsbruck, Austria, and concluded on 26 February 2023 in Winterberg, Germany.

== Calendar ==
Venue	Date	Details
(Austria) Innsbruck	3–4 December	Sprint
(Canada) Whistler (Vancouver)	10–11 December	Team Relay
(United States) Park City	17–18 December	Sprint
(Latvia) Sigulda	7–8 January	Team Relay
(Latvia) Sigulda	14–15 January	Team Relay/FIL European Championships
(Germany) Oberhof	27–29 January	World Championships (Doesn't count toward to the World Cup standings)
(Germany) Altenberg	4–5 February	Team Relay
(Germany) Winterberg	11–12 February	Sprint
(Switzerland) St. Moritz	18–19 February	Team Relay
(Germany) Winterberg	25–26 February	Team relay

== Results ==
=== Men's singles ===
Event:	Gold:	Time	Silver:	Time	Bronze:	Time
Innsbruck	Nico Gleirscher; Austria	1:39.283 (49.539 / 49.744)	Wolfgang Kindl; Austria	1:39.327 (49.639 / 49.688)	Jonas Müller; Austria	1:39.378 (49.571 / 49.807)
Innsbruck (Sprint)	Nico Gleirscher; Austria	32.599	Wolfgang Kindl; Austria	32.611	Dominik Fischnaller; Italy	32.633
Whistler	Felix Loch; Germany	1:39.619 (49.798 / 49.821)	Wolfgang Kindl; Austria	1:39.653 (49.833 / 49.820)	Dominik Fischnaller; Italy	1:39.689 (49.860 / 49.829)
Park City	Dominik Fischnaller; Italy	1:30.068 (45.077 / 44.991)	Felix Loch; Germany	1:30.253 (45.053 / 45.200)	David Gleirscher; Austria	1:30.272 (45.219 / 45.053)
Park City (Sprint)	Dominik Fischnaller; Italy	27.552	David Gleirscher; Austria	27.640	Felix Loch; Germany	27.682
Sigulda 1	Kristers Aparjods; Latvia	1:35.228 (47.615 / 47.613)	Max Langenhan; Germany	1:35.481 (47.822 / 47.659)	Dominik Fischnaller; Italy	1:35.495 (47.783 / 47.712)
Sigulda 2	Max Langenhan; Germany	1:32.588 (49.178 / 48.410)	Felix Loch; Germany	1:32.646 (49.066 / 48.580)	Kristers Aparjods; Latvia	1:32.673 (48.771 / 48.902)
Altenberg	Max Langenhan; Germany	1:47.574 (53.735 / 53.839)	Dominik Fischnaller; Italy	1:47.812 (53.984 / 53.828)	Felix Loch; Germany	1:47.906 (53.948 / 53.958)
Winterberg 1	Max Langenhan; Germany	1:45.687 (52.896 / 52.791)	Jonas Müller; Austria	1:45.987 (52.921 / 53.066)	Felix Loch; Germany	1:46.009 (53.053 / 52.956)
Winterberg 1 (Sprint)	Max Langenhan; Germany	36.161	Jonas Müller; Austria	36.221	Felix Loch; Germany	36.249
St. Moritz	Max Langenhan; Germany	2:13.596 (1:06.298 / 1:07.298)	Felix Loch; Germany	2:13.607 (1:06.566 / 1:07.041)	Kristers Aparjods; Latvia	2:13.915 (1:06.860 / 1:07.055)
Winterberg 2	Max Langenhan; Germany	1:43.364 (51.724 / 51.640)	Jonas Müller; Austria	1:43.543 (51.828 / 51.715)	Nico Gleirscher; Austria	1:43.603 (51.845 / 51.758)

=== Men's doubles ===
Event:	Gold:	Time	Silver:	Time	Bronze:	Time
Innsbruck	Juri Gatt; Riccardo Schöpf; Austria	1:18.915 (39.470 / 39.445)	Thomas Steu; Lorenz Koller; Austria	1:18.994 (39.387 / 39.607)	Yannick Müller; Armin Frauscher; Austria	1:18.998 (39.544 / 39.454)
Innsbruck (Sprint)	Yannick Müller; Armin Frauscher; Austria	29.822	Mārtiņš Bots; Roberts Plūme; Latvia	29.837	Hannes Orlamünder; Paul Gubitz; Germany	29.858
Whistler	Toni Eggert; Sascha Benecken; Germany	1:16.554 (38.305 / 38.249)	Tobias Wendl; Tobias Arlt; Germany	1:16.605 (38.307 / 38.298)	Juri Gatt; Riccardo Schöpf; Austria	1:16.740 (38.384 / 38.356)
Park City	Toni Eggert; Sascha Benecken; Germany	1:26.789 (43.539 / 43.250)	Juri Gatt; Riccardo Schöpf; Austria	1:26.822 (43.501 / 43.321)	Tobias Wendl; Tobias Arlt; Germany	1:26.867 (43.589 / 43.278)
Park City (Sprint)	Tobias Wendl; Tobias Arlt; Germany	31.862	Toni Eggert; Sascha Benecken; Germany	31.872	Yannick Müller; Armin Frauscher; Austria	31.892
Sigulda 1	Mārtiņš Bots; Roberts Plūme; Latvia	1:22.642 (41.361 / 41.281)	Tobias Wendl; Tobias Arlt; Germany	1:22.798 (41.463 / 41.335)	Emanuel Rieder; Simon Kainzwaldner; Italy	1:23.024 (41.503 / 41.521)
Sigulda 2	Tobias Wendl; Tobias Arlt; Germany	1:24.022 (42.173 / 42.849)	Mārtiņš Bots; Roberts Plūme; Latvia	1:24.084 (42.138 / 41.946)	Eduards Ševics-Mikeļševics; Lūkass Krasts; Latvia	1:24.111 (42.147 / 41.964)
Altenberg	Toni Eggert; Sascha Benecken; Germany	1:24.158 (42.165 / 41.993)	Tobias Wendl; Tobias Arlt; Germany	1:24.224 (42.200 / 42.024)	Mārtiņš Bots; Roberts Plūme; Latvia	1:24.376 (42.257 / 42.119)
Winterberg 1	Tobias Wendl; Tobias Arlt; Germany	1:27.141 (43.617 / 43.524)	Toni Eggert; Sascha Benecken; Germany	1:27.571 (43.876 / 43.695)	Mārtiņš Bots; Roberts Plūme; Latvia	1:27.641 (43.792 / 43.849)
Winterberg 1 (Sprint)	Tobias Wendl; Tobias Arlt; Germany	30.798	Toni Eggert; Sascha Benecken; Germany	30.801	Juri Gatt; Riccardo Schöpf; Austria	30.832
St. Moritz	Tobias Wendl; Tobias Arlt; Germany	1:47.183 (53.668 / 53.515)	Toni Eggert; Sascha Benecken; Germany	1:47.228 (53.713 / 53.515)	Mārtiņš Bots; Roberts Plūme; Latvia	1:47.424 (53.757 / 53.667)
Winterberg 2	Tobias Wendl; Tobias Arlt; Germany	1:26.690 (43.319 / 43.371)	Toni Eggert; Sascha Benecken; Germany	1:26.747 (43.241 / 43.506)	Juri Gatt; Riccardo Schöpf; Austria	1:26.822 (43.350 / 43.472)

=== Women's singles ===
Event:	Gold:	Time	Silver:	Time	Bronze:	Time
Innsbruck	Madeleine Egle; Austria	1:19.188 (39.574 / 39.614)	Emily Sweeney; United States	1:19.404 (39.718 / 39.686)	Julia Taubitz; Germany	1:19.436 (39.714 / 39.722)
Innsbruck (Sprint)	Madeleine Egle; Austria	29.908	Emily Sweeney; United States	29.927	Julia Taubitz; Germany	29.937
Whistler	Madeleine Egle; Austria	1:17.137 (38.642 / 38.495)	Julia Taubitz; Germany	1:17.161 (38.651 / 38.510)	Merle Fräbel; Germany	1:17.182 (38.628 / 38.554)
Park City	Dajana Eitberger; Germany	1:26.471 (43.269 / 43.202)	Emily Sweeney; United States	1:26.610 (43.345 / 43.266)	Julia Taubitz; Germany	1:26.619 (43.333 / 43.286)
Park City (Sprint)	Julia Taubitz; Germany	31.717	Dajana Eitberger; Germany	31.816	Brittney Arndt; United States	31.902
Sigulda 1	Dajana Eitberger; Germany	1:22.999 (41.488 / 41.511)	Elīna Ieva Vītola; Latvia	1:23.093 (41.578 / 41.515)	Julia Taubitz; Germany	1:23.143 (41.643 / 41.500)
Sigulda 2	Anna Berreiter; Germany	1:24.600 (42.546 / 42.054)	Dajana Eitberger; Germany	1:24.631 (42.461 / 42.170)	Elīna Ieva Vītola; Latvia	1:24.637 (42.488 / 42.149)
Altenberg	Julia Taubitz; Germany	1:45.727 (52.819 / 52.908)	Anna Berreiter; Germany	1:46.034 (53.066 / 52.968)	Dajana Eitberger; Germany	1:46.057 (52.953 / 53.104)
Winterberg 1	Julia Taubitz; Germany	1:51.683 (55.634 / 56.049)	Anna Berreiter; Germany	1:51.891 (55.871 / 56.020)	Emily Sweeney; United States	1:52.038 (55.837 / 56.201)
Winterberg 1 (Sprint)	Julia Taubitz; Germany	38.989	Kendija Aparjode; Latvia	39.110	Merle Fräbel; Germany	39.111
St. Moritz	Dajana Eitberger; Germany	1:48.396 (54.161 / 54.235)	Julia Taubitz; Germany	1:48.406 (54.124 / 54.282)	Anna Berreiter; Germany	1:48.467 (54.097 / 54.370)
Winterberg 2	Madeleine Egle; Austria	1:52.843 (56.761 / 56.082)	Lisa Schulte; Austria	1:53.067 (56.884 / 56.183)	Anna Berreiter; Germany	1:53.088 (57.108 / 55.980)

=== Women's doubles ===
Event:	Gold:	Time	Silver:	Time	Bronze:	Time
Innsbruck	Selina Egle; Lara Kipp; Austria	1:20.019 (40.021 / 39.998)	Jessica Degenhardt; Cheyenne Rosenthal; Germany	1:20.195 (40.122 / 40.073)	Andrea Vötter; Marion Oberhofer; Italy	1:20.252 (40.123 / 40.129)
Innsbruck (Sprint)	Selina Egle; Lara Kipp; Austria	30.219	Andrea Vötter; Marion Oberhofer; Italy	30.301	Anda Upīte; Sanija Ozoliņa; Latvia	30.332
Whistler	Andrea Vötter; Marion Oberhofer; Italy	1:17.912 (39.016 / 38.896)	Selina Egle; Lara Kipp; Austria	1:17.953 (39.017 / 38.936)	Jessica Degenhardt; Cheyenne Rosenthal; Germany	1:17.968 (38.991 / 38.977)
Park City	Andrea Vötter; Marion Oberhofer; Italy	1:28.302 (44.258 / 44.044)	Jessica Degenhardt; Cheyenne Rosenthal; Germany	1:28.905 (44.448 / 44.457)	Caitlin Nash; Natalie Corless; Canada	1:28.955 (44.603 / 44.352)
Park City (Sprint)	Selina Egle; Lara Kipp; Austria	32.195	Andrea Vötter; Marion Oberhofer; Italy	32.322	Jessica Degenhardt; Cheyenne Rosenthal; Germany	32.470
Sigulda 1	Anda Upīte; Sanija Ozoliņa; Latvia	1:24.926 (42.435 / 42.491)	Chevonne Forgan; Sophia Kirby; United States	1:25.138 (42.537 / 42.601)	Jessica Degenhardt; Cheyenne Rosenthal; Germany	1:25.261 (42.620 / 42.641)
Sigulda 2	Andrea Vötter; Marion Oberhofer; Italy	1:26.281 (43.235 / 43.046)	Anda Upīte; Sanija Ozoliņa; Latvia	1:26.782 (43.387 / 43.395)	Jessica Degenhardt; Cheyenne Rosenthal; Germany	1:26.839 (43.534 / 43.305)
Altenberg	Andrea Vötter; Marion Oberhofer; Italy	1:25.650 (42.914 / 42.736)	Jessica Degenhardt; Cheyenne Rosenthal; Germany	1:25.701 (42.813 / 42.888)	Selina Egle; Lara Kipp; Austria	1:25.927 (42.964 / 42.963)
Winterberg 1	Jessica Degenhardt; Cheyenne Rosenthal; Germany	1:28.288 (44.108 / 44.180)	Selina Egle; Lara Kipp; Austria	1:28.508 (44.254 / 44.254)	Andrea Vötter; Marion Oberhofer; Italy	1:28.534 (44.207 / 44.327)
Winterberg 1 (Sprint)	Anda Upīte; Sanija Ozoliņa; Latvia	31.483	Andrea Vötter; Marion Oberhofer; Italy	31.514	Nadia Falkensteiner; Annalena Huber; Italy	31.561
St. Moritz	Jessica Degenhardt; Cheyenne Rosenthal; Germany	1:49.577 (54.827 / 54.750)	Andrea Vötter; Marion Oberhofer; Italy	1:49.579 (54.698 / 54.881)	Viktorija Ziediņa; Selīna Zvilna; Latvia	1:50.703 (55.283 / 55.420)
Winterberg 2	Selina Egle; Lara Kipp; Austria	1:28.169 (43.916 / 44.253)	Jessica Degenhardt; Cheyenne Rosenthal; Germany	1:28.508 (44.169 / 44.339)	Andrea Vötter; Marion Oberhofer; Italy	1:28.554 (44.163 / 44.391)

=== Team relay ===
Event:	Gold:	Time	Silver:	Time	Bronze:	Time
Whistler	Germany; Julia Taubitz; Felix Loch; Toni Eggert/Sascha Benecken	2:04.222 (40.089 / 1:24.133)	Latvia; Elīna Ieva Vītola; Kristers Aparjods; Mārtiņš Bots/Roberts Plūme	2:04.369 (40.239 / 1:24.130)	Austria; Madeleine Egle; Wolfgang Kindl; Juri Gatt/Riccardo Schöpf	2:04.949 (40.510 / 1:24.439)
Sigulda 1	Latvia; Elīna Ieva Vītola; Kristers Aparjods; Mārtiņš Bots/Roberts Plūme	2:12.111 (43.046 / 1:29.065)	Germany; Dajana Eitberger; Felix Loch; Toni Eggert/Sascha Benecken	2:12.339 (43.074 / 1:29.265)	United States; Emily Sweeney; Tucker West; Zachary Di Gregorio/Sean Hollander	2:12.948 (43.061 / 1:29.887)
Sigulda 2	Latvia; Elīna Ieva Vītola; Kristers Aparjods; Mārtiņš Bots/Roberts Plūme	2:13.143 (43.479 / 1:27.975)	Germany; Anna Berreiter; Max Langenhan; Tobias Wendl/Tobias Arlt	2:13.510 (43.391 / 1:28.467)	Italy; Sandra Robatscher; Dominik Fischnaller; Emanuel Rieder/Simon Kainzwaldner	2:13.917 (43.552 / 1:28.617)
Altenberg	Austria; Madeleine Egle; Wolfgang Kindl; Yannick Müller/Armin Frauscher	2:23.742 (46.836 / 1:35.030)	Germany; Julia Taubitz; Max Langenhan; Toni Eggert/Sascha Benecken	2:23.840 (46.983 / 1:35.216)	Latvia; Elīna Ieva Vītola; Kristers Aparjods; Mārtiņš Bots/Roberts Plūme	2:23.881 (47.029 / 1:35.283)
St. Moritz	Germany; Dajana Eitberger; Max Langenhan; Tobias Wendl/Tobias Arlt	2:51.301 (55.885 / 1:53.945)	United States; Emily Sweeney; Tucker West; Zachary Di Gregorio/Sean Hollander	2:51.555 (56.033 / 1:53.764)	Austria; Madeleine Egle; Nico Gleirscher; Thomas Steu/Lorenz Koller	2:51.716 (56.264 / 1:53.709)
Winterberg	Austria; Madeleine Egle; Jonas Müller; Juri Gatt/Riccardo Schöpf	2:22.732 (46.518 / 1:34.425)	Germany; Anna Berreiter; Max Langenhan; Tobias Wendl/Tobias Arlt	2:23.291 (46.763 / 1:34.858)	United States; Emily Sweeney; Tucker West; Zachary Di Gregorio/Sean Hollander	2:23.570 (46.848 / 1:35.190)

== Standings ==
=== Men's singles Overall ===
Pos.	Luger	Points
1.	Dominik Fischnaller (ITA)	812
2.	Felix Loch (GER)	767
3.	Max Langenhan (GER)	685
4.	Wolfgang Kindl (AUT)	660
5.	David Gleirscher (AUT)	638
6.	Kristers Aparjods (LAT)	600
7.	Jonas Müller (AUT)	583
8.	Nico Gleirscher (AUT)	560
9.	Gints Bērziņš (LAT)	467
10.	Tucker West (USA)	459

- Final standings after 12 events

=== Men's singles ===
Pos.	Luger	Points
1.	Felix Loch (GER)	627
2.	Dominik Fischnaller (ITA)	592
3.	Max Langenhan (GER)	585
4.	Kristers Aparjods (LAT)	515
5.	Wolfgang Kindl (AUT)	501
6.	Nico Gleirscher (AUT)	460
7.	David Gleirscher (AUT)	433
8.	Jonas Müller (AUT)	409
9.	Gints Bērziņš (LAT)	366
10.	Tucker West (USA)	355

- Final standings after 9 events

=== Men's singles Sprint ===
Pos.	Luger	Points
1.	Dominik Fischnaller (ITA)	220
2.	David Gleirscher (AUT)	205
3.	Jonas Müller (AUT)	174
4.	Wolfgang Kindl (AUT)*	159
5.	Leon Felderer (ITA)	144
6.	Felix Loch (GER)	140
7.	Jonathan Gustafson (USA)	136
8.	Jozef Ninis (SVK)	128
9.	Kristers Aparjods (LAT)	110
10.	Tucker West (USA)	104

- Final standings after 3 events
- (*Champions 2022)

=== Women's singles Overall ===
Pos.	Luger	Points
1.	Julia Taubitz (GER)*	947
2.	Dajana Eitberger (GER)	852
3.	Anna Berreiter (GER)	789
4.	Madeleine Egle (AUT)	703
5.	Emily Sweeney (USA)	602
6.	Merle Fräbel (GER)	542
7.	Elīna Ieva Vītola (LAT)	526
8.	Kendija Aparjode (LAT)	450
9.	Andrea Vötter (ITA)	431
10.	Natalie Maag (SUI)	429

- Final standings after 12 events
- (*Champion 2022)

=== Women's singles ===
Pos.	Luger	Points
1.	Julia Taubitz (GER)	677
2.	Dajana Eitberger (GER)	661
3.	Anna Berreiter (GER)	640
4.	Madeleine Egle (AUT)*	545
5.	Emily Sweeney (USA)	442
6.	Elīna Ieva Vītola (LAT)	420
7.	Merle Fräbel (GER)	385
8.	Lisa Schulte (AUT)	337
9.	Kendija Aparjode (LAT)	337
10.	Andrea Vötter (ITA)	331

- Final standings after 9 events
- (*Champion 2022)

=== Women's singles Sprint ===
Pos.	Luger	Points
1.	Julia Taubitz (GER)*	270
2.	Dajana Eitberger (GER)	191
3.	Emily Sweeney (USA)	160
4.	Madeleine Egle (AUT)	158
5.	Merle Fräbel (GER)	157
6.	Anna Berreiter (GER)	149
7.	Ashley Farquharson (USA)	126
8.	Kendija Aparjode (LAT)	113
9.	Hannah Prock (AUT)	110
10.	Elīna Ieva Vītola (LAT)	106

- Final standings after 3 events
- (*Champions 2022)

=== Men's doubles Overall ===
Pos.	Luger	Points
1.	Tobias Wendl / Tobias Arlt (GER)	1014
2.	Toni Eggert / Sascha Benecken (GER)*	955
3.	Mārtiņš Bots / Roberts Plūme (LAT)	757
4.	Juri Gatt / Riccardo Schöpf (AUT)	686
5.	Hannes Orlamünder / Paul Gubitz (GER)	600
6.	Yannick Müller / Armin Frauscher (AUT)	591
7.	Thomas Steu / Lorenz Koller (AUT)	557
8.	Emanuel Rieder / Simon Kainzwaldner (ITA)	523
9.	Zachary Di Gregorio / Sean Hollander (USA)	476
10.	Eduards Ševics-Mikeļševics / Lūkass Krasts (LAT)	458

- Final standings after 12 events
- (*Champion 2022)

=== Men's doubles ===
Pos.	Luger	Points
1.	Tobias Wendl / Tobias Arlt (GER)	780
2.	Toni Eggert / Sascha Benecken (GER)*	730
3.	Mārtiņš Bots / Roberts Plūme (LAT)	587
4.	Juri Gatt / Riccardo Schöpf (AUT)	496
5.	Hannes Orlamünder / Paul Gubitz (GER)	425
6.	Emanuel Rieder / Simon Kainzwaldner (ITA)	417
7.	Thomas Steu / Lorenz Koller (AUT)	410
8.	Eduards Ševics-Mikeļševics / Lūkass Krasts (LAT)	388
9.	Yannick Müller / Armin Frauscher (AUT)	385
10.	Zachary Di Gregorio / Sean Hollander (USA)	352

- Final standings after 9 events
- (*Champion 2022)

=== Men's doubles Sprint ===
Pos.	Luger	Points
1.	Tobias Wendl / Tobias Arlt (GER)	234
2.	Toni Eggert / Sascha Benecken (GER)	225
3.	Yannick Müller / Armin Frauscher (AUT)	206
4.	Juri Gatt / Riccardo Schöpf (AUT)	190
5.	Hannes Orlamünder / Paul Gubitz (GER)	175
6.	Mārtiņš Bots / Roberts Plūme (LAT)	170
7.	Thomas Steu / Lorenz Koller (AUT)	147
8.	Zachary Di Gregorio / Sean Hollander (USA)	124
9.	Wojclech Jerzy Chmielewski / Jakub Kowalewski (POL)	108
10.	Emanuel Rieder / Simon Kainzwaldner (ITA)	106

- Final standings after 3 events

=== Women's doubles Overall ===
Pos.	Luger	Points
1.	Andrea Vötter / Marion Oberhofer (ITA)	1010
2.	Selina Egle / Lara Kipp (AUT)	915
3.	Jessica Degenhardt / Cheyenne Rosenthal (GER)	898
4.	Anda Upīte / Sanija Ozoliņa (LAT)	637
5.	Chevonne Forgan / Sophia Kirkby (USA)	635
6.	Raluca Stramaturaru / Mihaela-Carmen Manolescu (ROU)	498
7.	Maya Chan / Reannyn Weiler (USA)	428
8.	Nadia Falkensteiner / Annalena Huber (ITA)	335
9.	Summer Britcher / Emily Sweeney (USA)	295
10.	Viktorija Ziediņa / Selīna Zvilna (LAT)	257

- Final standings after 12 events

=== Women's doubles ===
Pos.	Luger	Points
1.	Andrea Vötter / Marion Oberhofer (ITA)	755
2.	Jessica Degenhardt / Cheyenne Rosenthal (GER)	750
3.	Selina Egle / Lara Kipp (AUT)	660
4.	Chevonne Forgan / Sophia Kirkby (USA)	493
5.	Anda Upīte / Sanija Ozoliņa (LAT)	467
6.	Raluca Stramaturaru / Mihaela-Carmen Manolescu (ROU)	386
7.	Maya Chan / Reannyn Weiler (USA)	277
8.	Nadia Falkensteiner / Annalena Huber (ITA)	210
9.	Viktorija Ziediņa / Selīna Zvilna (LAT)	197
10.	Summer Britcher / Emily Sweeney (USA)	175

- Final standings after 9 events

=== Women's doubles Sprint ===
Pos.	Luger	Points
1.	Selina Egle / Lara Kipp (AUT)	255
1.	Andrea Vötter / Marion Oberhofer (ITA)	255
3.	Anda Upīte / Sanija Ozoliņa (LAT)	170
4.	Maya Chan / Reannyn Weiler (USA)	151
5.	Jessica Degenhardt / Cheyenne Rosenthal (GER)	148
6.	Chevonne Forgan / Sophia Kirkby (USA)	142
7.	Nadia Falkensteiner / Annalena Huber (ITA)	125
8.	Summer Britcher / Emily Sweeney (USA)	120
9.	Raluca Stramaturaru / Mihaela-Carmen Manolescu (ROU)	112
10.	Nikola Domowicz / Dominika Piwkowska (POL)	78

- Final standings after 3 events

=== Team Relay ===
Pos.	Luger	Points
1.	Germany*	540
2.	Latvia	470
3.	Austria	340
4.	United States	335
5.	Italy	310
6.	Poland	252
7.	China	181
8.	Romania	150
9.	Ukraine	110
10.	Slovakia	55

- Final standings after 6 events
- (*Champion 2022)

== Points ==
Place	1	2	3	4	5	6	7	8	9	10	11	12	13	14	15	16	17	18	19	20
Singles, Doubles and Relay	100	85	70	60	55	50	46	42	39	36	34	32	30	28	26	25	24	23	22	21

== Podium table by nation ==
Table showing the World Cup podium places (gold–1st place, silver–2nd place, bronze–3rd place) by the countries represented by the athletes.

Rank	Nation	Gold	Silver	Bronze	Total
1	Germany	28	26	19	73
2	Austria	14	12	11	37
3	Latvia	6	6	10	22
4	Italy	6	5	9	20
5	United States	0	5	4	9
6	Canada	0	0	1	1
Totals (6 entries)		54	54	54	162
