= 2024 FIL World Luge Championships – Women's sprint =

Women's sprint at the 2024 FIL World Luge Championships
- Venue: Altenberg bobsleigh, luge, and skeleton track
- Location: Altenberg, Germany
- Dates: 26 January
- Competitors: 34 from 16 nations
- Winning time: 37.702

Medalists
gold medal	Julia Taubitz	Germany
silver medal	Natalie Maag	Switzerland
bronze medal	Elīna Ieva Vītola	Latvia

The Women's sprint competition at the 2024 FIL World Luge Championships was held on 26 January 2024.

== Results ==
The qualification was started at 09:30. The final was held at 13:56.

Rank	Bib	Name	Country	Qualification		Final	
Rank	Bib	Name	Country	Time	Rank	Time	Diff
1st place, gold medalist(s)	15	Julia Taubitz	Germany	37.543	2	37.702	1
2nd place, silver medalist(s)	6	Natalie Maag	Switzerland	37.735	8	37.774	2
3rd place, bronze medalist(s)	8	Elīna Ieva Vītola	Latvia	37.848	11	37.813	3
4	13	Ashley Farquharson	United States	38.025	15	37.833	4
5	5	Kendija Aparjode	Latvia	37.578	3	37.854	5
6	16	Sandra Robatscher	Italy	37.707	7	37.872	6
7	4	Merle Fräbel	Germany	37.584	4	37.918	7
8	9	Summer Britcher	United States	37.817	10	37.923	8
9	14	Madeleine Egle	Austria	37.689	6	37.934	9
10	10	Lisa Schulte	Austria	37.502	1	37.946	10
11	7	Hannah Prock	Austria	37.760	9	37.953	11
12	1	Verena Hofer	Italy	37.994	14	37.965	12
13	12	Anna Berreiter	Germany	37.612	5	37.970	13
14	19	Embyr-Lee Susko	Canada	37.937	13	38.001	14
15	17	Nina Zöggeler	Italy	37.920	12	38.015	15
16	18	Barbara Allmaier	Austria	38.054	16	Did not advance	
17	11	Emily Sweeney	United States	38.148	17	Did not advance	
18	23	Melina Fischer	Germany	38.303	18	Did not advance	
19	2	Trinity Ellis	Canada	38.346	19	Did not advance	
20	25	Verónica María Ravenna	Argentina	38.434	20	Did not advance	
21	21	Caitlin Nash	Canada	38.441	21	Did not advance	
22	22	Klaudia Domaradzka	Poland	38.478	22	Did not advance	
23	26	Tove Kohala	Sweden	38.547	23	Did not advance	
24	29	Wang Peixuan	China	38.716	24	Did not advance	
25	28	Jung Hye-sun	South Korea	38.831	25	Did not advance	
26	24	Frančeska Bona	Latvia	38.848	26	Did not advance	
27	34	Tereza Nosková	Slovakia	38.979	27	Did not advance	
28	31	Yulianna Tunytska	Ukraine	39.155	28	Did not advance	
29	27	Hu Huilan	China	39.384	29	Did not advance	
30	32	Elsa Desmond	Ireland	39.501	30	Did not advance	
31	30	Anna Shkret	Ukraine	39.767	31	Did not advance	
32	36	Zhou Liangziting	China	40.304	32	Did not advance	
–	20	Ioana Corina Buzăţoiu	Romania	Did not finish			
–	3	Sigita Bērziņa	Latvia	Did not finish			
–	33	Anna Čežíková	Czech Republic	Did not start			
–	35	Lucie Jansová	Czech Republic	Did not start			
