= Luge at the 2026 Winter Olympics – Women's singles =

Luge women's singles at the XXV Olympic Winter Games
- Luge pictogram
- Venue: Cortina Sliding Centre
- Date: 9, 10 February 2026
- Competitors: 25 from 15 nations
- Winning time: 3:30.625

Medalists
1st place, gold medalist(s)		Julia Taubitz	Germany
2nd place, silver medalist(s)		Elīna Ieva Bota	Latvia
3rd place, bronze medalist(s)		Ashley Farquharson	United States

The women's singles competition in luge at the 2026 Winter Olympics was held on 9 February (heats 1 and 2) and 10 February (heats 3 and 4), at the Cortina Sliding Centre in Cortina d'Ampezzo. Julia Taubitz of Germany won the event, Elīna Ieva Bota of Latvia won the silver medal, and Ashley Farquharson of the United States bronze. For all of them, these were first Olympic medals.

== Background ==
The 2022 Olympic champion, Natalie Geisenberger, retired from competitions. The bronze medalist, Tatiana Ivanova, was barred from participation, since after the Russian invasion to Ukraine Russian athletes could only compete in neutral status, and Ivanova did not obtain one. The silver medalist, Anna Berreiter, qualified for the 2026 Olympics. Lisa Schulte was leading the singles standing of 2025–26 Luge World Cup before the Olympics, even though she has not won a single event. Julia Taubitz was the 2025 World champion, with Merle Fräbel second and Emily Sweeney third. Sweeney changed her name to Fischnaller in the meanwhile, following her marriage to Dominik Fischnaller.

== Qualification ==
=== Summary ===
Number of sleds	Athletes total	Nation
3	9	Austria; Germany; United States
2	8	Canada; Italy; Latvia; Ukraine
1	8	Argentina; China; Individual Neutral Athletes; Poland; Romania; South Korea; Sweden; Switzerland

== Results ==
Rank	Bib	Athlete	Country	Run 1	Rank	Run 2	Rank	Run 3	Rank	Run 4	Rank	Total	Behind
1st place, gold medalist(s)	1	Julia Taubitz	Germany	52.638	2	52.550 TR	1	52.730	1	52.707	1	3:30.625	
2nd place, silver medalist(s)	3	Elīna Ieva Bota	Latvia	52.878	5	52.805	3	52.939	4	52.921	6	3:31.543	+0.918
3rd place, bronze medalist(s)	16	Ashley Farquharson	United States	52.862	4	52.934	7	52.877	3	52.909	4	3:31.582	+0.957
4	11	Verena Hofer	Italy	52.861	3	52.882	4	52.977	5	52.925	7	3:31.645	+1.020
5	7	Sandra Robatscher	Italy	52.886	6	52.915	5	53.026	7	52.905	3	3:31.732	+1.107
6	10	Anna Berreiter	Germany	53.051	10	53.004	10	53.009	6	52.946	8	3:32.010	+1.385
7	2	Lisa Schulte	Austria	52.945	8	52.921	6	53.070	9	53.126	12	3:32.062	+1.437
8	5	Merle Fräbel	Germany	52.590 TR	1	52.659	2	54.144	20	52.779	2	3:32.172	+1.547
9	12	Natalie Maag	Switzerland	53.051	10	53.148	12	53.169	11	53.039	9	3:32.407	+1.782
10	4	Hannah Prock	Austria	53.131	12	53.230	14	53.271	12	53.131	13	3:32.763	+2.138
11	8	Dorothea Schwarz	Austria	53.595	16	53.052	11	53.080	10	53.103	11	3:32.830	+2.205
12	17	Emily Fischnaller	United States	52.892	7	52.980	9	52.876	2	54.287	19	3:33.035	+2.410
13	13	Daria Olesik	Individual Neutral Athletes	53.289	13	53.362	15	53.348	14	53.211	14	3:33.210	+2.585
14	6	Summer Britcher	United States	53.389	15	53.225	13	53.516	15	53.423	16	3:33.553	+2.928
15	15	Embyr-Lee Susko	Canada	53.028	9	54.390	21	53.294	13	53.090	10	3:33.802	+3.177
16	9	Kendija Aparjode	Latvia	55.059	24	52.961	8	53.049	8	52.919	5	3:33.988	+3.363
17	14	Trinity Ellis	Canada	53.351	14	53.510	16	54.065	19	53.403	15	3:34.329	+3.704
18	24	Yulianna Tunytska	Ukraine	53.713	18	53.626	18	53.884	18	53.600	17	3:34.823	+4.198
19	25	Tove Kohala	Sweden	54.425	22	53.615	17	53.740	17	53.708	18	3:35.488	+4.863
20	19	Olena Smaha	Ukraine	53.619	17	54.027	19	53.678	16	54.364	20	3:35.688	+5.063
21	20	Wang Peixuan	China	53.897	19	54.460	22	54.274	22	Did not advance		2:42.631	—
22	23	Verónica Ravenna	Argentina	54.038	20	54.517	24	54.341	23	Did not advance		2:42.896	—
23	21	Klaudia Domaradzka	Poland	54.663	23	54.310	20	54.365	24	Did not advance		2:43.338	—
24	18	Jung Hye-sun	South Korea	55.118	25	54.469	23	54.194	21	Did not advance		2:43.781	—
25	22	Corina Buzățoiu	Romania	54.062	21	55.786	25	54.418	25	Did not advance		2:44.266	—
