= 2025 FIL World Luge Championships – Women's singles =

Women's singles at the 2025 FIL World Luge Championships
- Venue: Whistler Sliding Centre
- Location: Whistler, British Columbia, Canada
- Dates: 7 February
- Competitors: 31 from 14 nations

Medalists
gold medal	Julia Taubitz	Germany
silver medal	Merle Fräbel	Germany
bronze medal	Emily Sweeney	United States

The Women's singles competition at the 2025 FIL World Luge Championships was held on 7 February 2025.

== Results ==
The race was started at 17:20.

Rank	Bib	Name	Country	Run 1	Rank	Run 2	Rank	Total	Diff
1st place, gold medalist(s)	17	Julia Taubitz	Germany	38.601	2	38.605	1	1:17.206	
2nd place, silver medalist(s)	18	Merle Fräbel	Germany	38.619	3	38.628	2	1:17.247	+0.041
3rd place, bronze medalist(s)	15	Emily Sweeney	United States	38.594	1	38.655	5	1:17.249	+0.043
4	9	Embyr-Lee Susko	Canada	38.653	4	38.634	3	1:17.287	+0.081
5	14	Natalie Maag	Switzerland	38.713	7	38.636	4	1:17.349	+0.143
6	16	Ashley Farquharson	United States	38.683	5	38.670	6	1:17.353	+0.147
7	20	Madeleine Egle	Austria	38.688	6	38.712	8	1:17.400	+0.194
8	13	Kendija Aparjode	Latvia	38.716	8	38.733	10	1:17.449	+0.243
9	19	Elīna Ieva Bota	Latvia	38.741	9	38.724	9	1:17.465	+0.259
10	11	Summer Britcher	United States	38.790	12	38.676	7	1:17.466	+0.260
11	21	Anna Berreiter	Germany	38.774	11	38.790	12	1:17.564	+0.358
12	22	Lisa Schulte	Austria	38.768	10	38.817	13	1:17.585	+0.379
13	7	Trinity Ellis	Canada	38.884	16	38.769	11	1:17.653	+0.447
14	10	Hannah Prock	Austria	38.819	13	38.837	14	1:17.656	+0.450
15	6	Sandra Robatscher	Italy	38.834	14	38.855	15	1:17.689	+0.483
16	5	Caitlin Nash	Canada	38.865	15	38.890	17	1:17.755	+0.549
17	4	Verena Hofer	Italy	38.896	17	38.894	18	1:17.790	+0.584
18	12	Barbara Allmaier	Austria	38.942	18	38.894	18	1:17.836	+0.630
19	8	Melina Fischer	Germany	38.970	19	38.876	16	1:17.846	+0.640
20	3	Verónica María Ravenna	Argentina	39.037	20	39.044	20	1:18.081	+0.875
21	25	Nina Zöggeler	Italy	39.043	21	Did not advance			
22	24	Emma Erickson	United States	39.198	22	Did not advance			
23	27	Tove Kohala	Sweden	39.203	23	Did not advance			
24	23	Yulianna Tunytska	Ukraine	39.236	24	Did not advance			
25	1	Carolyn Maxwell	Canada	39.238	25	Did not advance			
26	2	Ioana Buzăţoiu	Romania	39.261	26	Did not advance			
27	29	Jung Hye-sun	South Korea	39.413	27	Did not advance			
28	30	Shin Yu-bin	South Korea	39.451	28	Did not advance			
29	28	Olena Smaha	Ukraine	39.529	29	Did not advance			
30	31	Elsa Desmond	Ireland	39.969	30	Did not advance			
31	26	Klaudia Domaradzka	Poland	40.100	31	Did not advance			
