= 2022 FIL European Luge Championships – Women's singles =

Women's singles at the 2022 FIL European Luge Championships
- Venue: St. Moritz-Celerina Olympic Bobrun
- Location: St. Moritz, Switzerland
- Dates: 23 January
- Competitors: 29 from 13 nations
- Winning time: 1:48.190

Medalists
gold medal	Natalie Geisenberger	Germany
silver medal	Madeleine Egle	Austria
bronze medal	Elīna Ieva Vītola	Latvia

The women's singles competition at the 2022 FIL European Luge Championships was held on 23 January 2022.

== Results ==
The first run was held at 09:43 and the second run at 11:10.

Rank	Bib	Name	Country	Run 1	Rank	Run 2	Rank	Total	Diff
1st place, gold medalist(s)	23	Natalie Geisenberger	Germany	54.131	1	54.059	2	1:48.190	
2nd place, silver medalist(s)	24	Madeleine Egle	Austria	54.376	3	53.969	1	1:48.345	+0.155
3rd place, bronze medalist(s)	21	Elīna Ieva Vītola	Latvia	54.300	2	54.156	4	1:48.456	+0.266
4	25	Julia Taubitz	Germany	54.383	4	54.131	3	1:48.514	+0.324
5	18	Tatiana Ivanova	Russia	54.489	5	54.364	7	1:48.853	+0.663
6	19	Elīza Tīruma	Latvia	54.598	7	54.337	6	1:48.935	+0.745
7	28	Anna Berreiter	Germany	54.634	9	54.333	5	1:48.967	+0.777
8	22	Andrea Vötter	Italy	54.604	8	54.485	10	1:49.089	+0.899
9	16	Verena Hofer	Italy	54.572	6	54.539	13	1:49.111	+0.921
10	12	Sigita Bērziņa	Latvia	54.713	13	54.428	8	1:49.141	+0.951
11	27	Victoria Demchenko	Russia	54.661	10	54.493	11	1:49.154	+0.964
12	15	Natalie Maag	Switzerland	54.747	14	54.483	9	1:49.230	+1.040
13	13	Kendija Aparjode	Latvia	54.756	15	54.497	12	1:49.253	+1.063
14	17	Ekaterina Katnikova	Russia	54.694	11	54.583	14	1:49.277	+1.087
15	11	Nina Zöggeler	Italy	54.700	12	54.693	16	1:49.393	+1.203
16	6	Sandra Robatscher	Italy	54.781	16	54.678	15	1:49.459	+1.269
17	26	Hannah Prock	Austria	54.978	17	54.799	17	1:49.777	+1.587
18	20	Lisa Schulte	Austria	55.001	18	54.815	18	1:49.816	+1.626
19	4	Olena Stetskiv	Ukraine	55.235	19	54.864	19	1:50.099	+1.909
20	8	Olena Smaha	Ukraine	55.337	21	55.071	20	1:50.408	+2.218
21	10	Katarína Šimoňáková	Slovakia	55.325	20	55.280	22	1:50.605	+2.415
22	3	Yulianna Tunytska	Ukraine	55.591	22	55.243	21	1:50.834	+2.644
23	1	Anna Čežíková	Czech Republic	55.743	23	55.527	24	1:51.270	+3.080
24	5	Klaudia Domaradzka	Poland	56.758	24	55.403	23	1:52.161	+3.971
		Cezara Curmei	Romania	Did not qualify via Nationscup					
		Natalia Jamróz	Poland	Did not qualify via Nationscup					
		Doina Descalui	Moldova	Did not qualify via Nationscup					
		Cheyenne Rosenthal	Germany	Did not qualify via Nationscup					
		Dania Obratov	Netherlands	Did not qualify via Nationscup					
