= 2020 FIL World Luge Championships – Women's sprint =

Women's sprint at the 2020 FIL World Luge Championships
- Venue: Sliding Center Sanki
- Location: Sochi, Russia
- Dates: 14 February
- Competitors: 29 from 14 nations
- Winning time: 31.105

Medalists
gold medal	Ekaterina Katnikova	Russia
silver medal	Tatiana Ivanova	Russia
bronze medal	Elīza Cauce	Latvia

The Women's sprint competition at the 2020 FIL World Luge Championships was held on 14 February 2020.

== Results ==
The qualification was held at 10:00 and the final at 14:28.

Rank	Bib	Name	Country	Qualification		Final	
Rank	Bib	Name	Country	Time	Rank	Time	Diff
1st place, gold medalist(s)	11	Ekaterina Katnikova	Russia	31.337	2	31.105	
2nd place, silver medalist(s)	15	Tatiana Ivanova	Russia	31.398	3	31.113	+0.008
3rd place, bronze medalist(s)	4	Elīza Cauce	Latvia	31.613	11	31.142	+0.037
4	14	Julia Taubitz	Germany	31.455	4	31.159	+0.054
5	13	Victoria Demchenko	Russia	31.325	1	31.173	+0.068
6	8	Kendija Aparjode	Latvia	31.499	6	31.262	+0.157
7	10	Summer Britcher	United States	31.594	10	31.281	+0.176
8	17	Olesya Mikhaylenko	Russia	31.555	8	31.287	+0.182
9	12	Anna Berreiter	Germany	31.473	5	31.292	+0.187
10	7	Cheyenne Rosenthal	Germany	31.635	12	31.394	+0.289
11	3	Ulla Zirne	Latvia	31.525	7	31.418	+0.313
12	2	Ashley Farquharson	United States	31.558	9	31.476	+0.371
13	22	Verena Hofer	Italy	31.708	15	31.505	+0.400
14	6	Natalie Maag	Switzerland	31.648	14	31.569	+0.464
15	5	Madeleine Egle	Austria	31.639	13	32.410	+1.305
16	19	Marion Oberhofer	Italy	31.737	16	Did not advance	
17	21	Lisa Schulte	Austria	31.776	17	Did not advance	
18	16	Brittney Arndt	United States	31.845	18	Did not advance	
19	23	Nina Zöggeler	Italy	32.030	19	Did not advance	
20	1	Raluca Strămăturaru	Romania	32.032	20	Did not advance	
21	9	Andrea Vötter	Italy	32.059	21	Did not advance	
22	20	Klaudia Domaradzka	Poland	32.062	22	Did not advance	
22	18	Katarína Šimoňáková	Slovakia	32.062	22	Did not advance	
24	29	Aileen Frisch	South Korea	32.179	24	Did not advance	
25	24	Michaela Maršíková	Czech Republic	32.408	25	Did not advance	
26	27	Jung Hye-sun	South Korea	32.719	26	Did not advance	
27	25	Daria Obratov	Netherlands	32.874	27	Did not advance	
28	26	Dania Obratov	Netherlands	33.496	28	Did not advance	
	28	Tatiana Salnikova	Kazakhstan	Did not finish		Did not advance	
