= Yulianna Tunytska =

Ukrainian luger (born 2003)

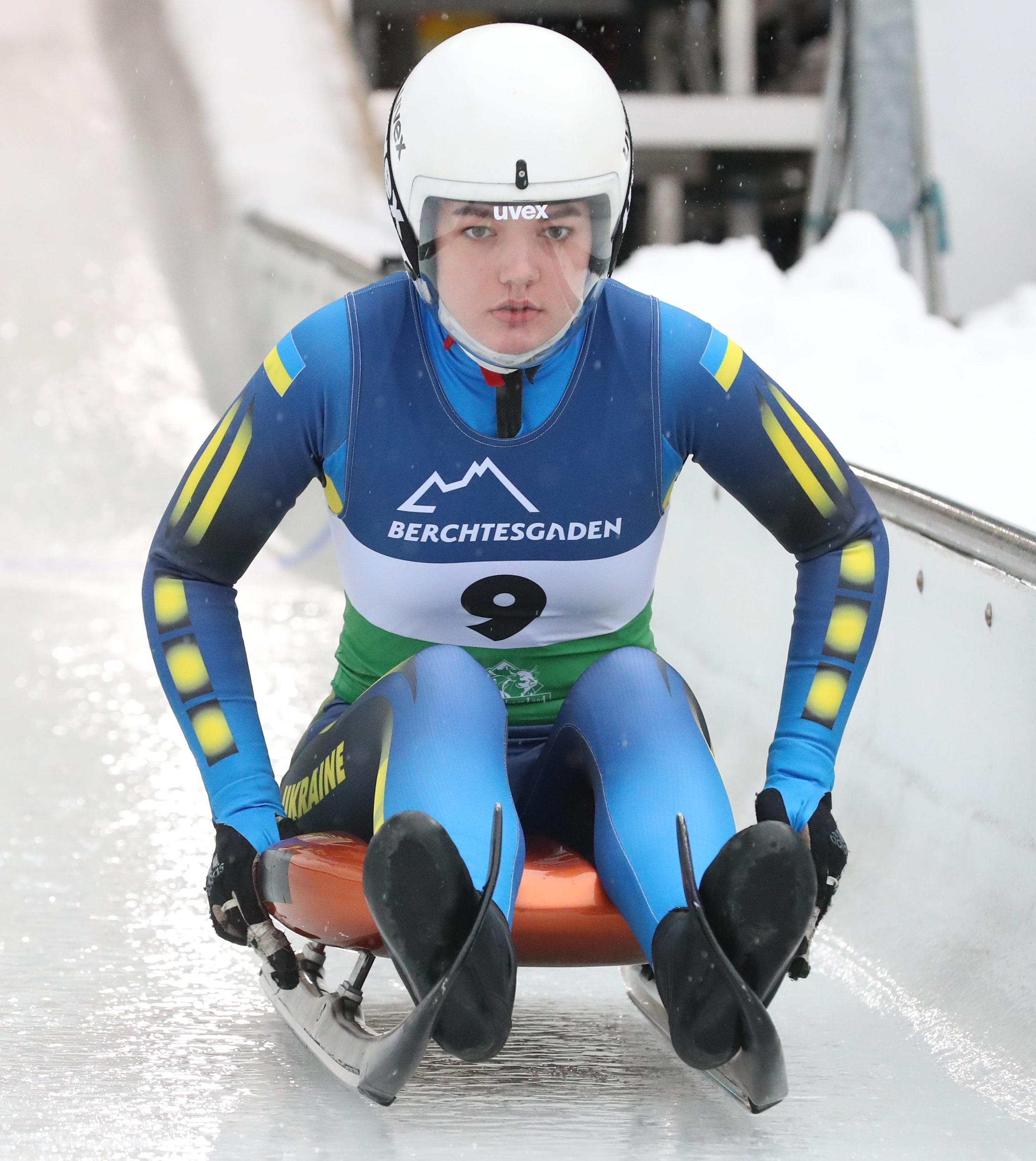
- Tunytska in 2021

Personal information
- Full name: Yulianna Ihorivna Tunytska
- Nationality: Ukrainian
- Born: 7 August 2003 (age 22) Kremenets, Ukraine

Sport
- Country: Ukraine
- Sport: Luge
- Event: Women's singles

Yulianna Ihorivna Tunytska (Ukrainian: Юліанна Ігорівна Туницька, born 7 August 2003 in Kremenets, Ukraine) is a Ukrainian luger. She competed at the 2022 and 2026 Winter Olympics.

== Career ==
Tunytska debuted in the World Cup during the 2018–19 season when she finished 23rd in Königssee. As of December 2025, her best individual Luge World Cup finish was 15th during the 2020–21 in Sigulda, Latvia.

Tunytska competed at the 2020 Winter Youth Olympics in Lausanne, Switzerland, where she was 5th in the singles competition and 6th in the team relay (together with Pylypiv, Mykyievych, and Babura).

In 2022, Yulianna Tunytska was nominated for her first Winter Games in Beijing. In the singles event, she finished 21st.

On January 5, 2025, Tunytska finished third in the mixed relay event in Sigulda. The team also included Mandziy, Hoy, Kachmar, Stetskiv, and Mokh. This marked the first ever medal for Ukraine in the relay event.

== Career results ==
=== Winter Olympics ===
Year	Event	Singles	Relay
2022	Beijing, China	21	11
2026	Cortina d'Ampezzo, Italy	18	6

=== World Championships ===
Year	Event	Singles	Relay	Singles Sprint	Mixed Singles
2021	Königssee, Germany	30	—	41	—N/a
2023	Oberhof, Germany	21	8	21	—N/a
2024	Altenberg, Germany	25	8	28	—N/a
2025	Whistler, Canada	24	6	—N/a	13

=== European Championships ===
Year	Event	Singles	Relay	Mixed Singles
2021	Sigulda, Latvia	12	—	—N/a
2022	St. Moritz, Switzerland	22	—	—N/a
2024	Igls, Austria	—	5	—N/a
2025	Winterberg, Germany	18	6	—N/a
2026	Oberhof, Germany	13	5	9

=== Luge World Cup ===
==== Relay podiums ====
Season	Track	Competition	Placement
2024–25	Sigulda, Latvia	Mixed relay	3

==== Rankings ====
Season	Singles	Singles Sprint	Overall
2018–19	44		—N/a
2019–20	Missed the season		—N/a
2020–21	37		37
2021–22	31		33
2022–23	Missed the season		
2023–24	32		32
2024–25	19	—N/a	
2025–26	17	—N/a	

== Personal life ==
Tunytska graduated from the West Ukrainian National University where she studied accountancy and taxation.
