= 2019 FIL Junior European Luge Championships =

The 2019 FIL Junior European Luge Championships took place under the auspices of the International Luge Federation at St. Moritz-Celerina Olympic Bobrun, St. Moritz, Switzerland from 18 to 19 January 2019.

== Schedule ==
Four events were held.

Date	Events
18 January	Junior doubles first run
18 January	Junior doubles second run
19 January	Junior men first run
19 January	Junior men second run
19 January	Junior women first run
19 January	Junior women second run
19 January	Team relay

== Medalists ==
Event	Gold	Time	Silver	Time	Bronze	Time
Junior men's	Germany; David Nößler	2:18.801	Germany; Moritz Bollmann	2:19.014 +0.213	Italy; Lukas Gufler	2:19.503 +0.870
Junior women's	Italy; Verena Hofer	1:48.989	Latvia; Elīna Vītola	1:49.334 +0.345	Germany; Anna Berreiter	1:49.560 +0.571
Junior doubles	Germany; Hannes Orlamünder; Paul Gubitz	1:48.725	Germany; Max Ewald; Jakob Jannusch	1:49.457 +0.732	Italy; Leon Felderer; Lukas Gufler	1:49.556 +0.831
Team relay	Germany; Anna Berreiter; David Nößler; Hannes Orlamünder / Paul Gubitz	2:41.052	Latvia; Elīna Vītola; Gints Bērziņš; Mārtiņš Bots / Roberts Plūme	2:42.797 +1.745	Italy; Verena Hofer; Alex Gufler; Leon Felderer / Lukas Gufler	2:42.908 +1.856

== Medal table ==
Rank	Nation	Gold	Silver	Bronze	Total
1	Germany (GER)	3	2	1	6
2	Italy (ITA)	1	0	3	4
3	Latvia (LAT)	0	2	0	2
Totals (3 entries)		4	4	4	12
