= 2023 FIL European Luge Championships – Team relay =

Team relay at the 2023 FIL European Luge Championships
- Venue: Sigulda bobsleigh, luge, and skeleton track
- Location: Sigulda, Latvia
- Dates: 15 January
- Competitors: 21 from 7 nations
- Teams: 7
- Winning time: 2:13.143

Medalists
gold medal	Elīna Ieva Vītola; Kristers Aparjods; Mārtiņš Bots; Roberts Plūme	Latvia
silver medal	Anna Berreiter; Max Langenhan; Tobias Wendl; Tobias Arlt	Germany
bronze medal	Sandra Robatscher; Dominik Fischnaller; Emanuel Rieder; Simon Kainzwaldner	Italy

The team relay competition at the 2023 FIL European Luge Championships was held on 15 January 2023.

== Results ==
The event was started at 13:48.

Rank	Bib	Athlete	Country	Women's singles	Men's singles	Doubles	Total	Behind
1st place, gold medalist(s)	8–1; 8–2; 8–3	Elīna Ieva Vītola; Kristers Aparjods; Mārtiņš Bots / Roberts Plūme	Latvia	43.479	44.496	45.168	2:13.143	
2nd place, silver medalist(s)	9–1; 9–2; 9–3	Anna Berreiter; Max Langenhan; Tobias Wendl / Tobias Arlt	Germany	43.391	45.076	45.043	2:13.510	+0.367
3rd place, bronze medalist(s)	6–1; 6–2; 6–3	Sandra Robatscher; Dominik Fischnaller; Emanuel Rieder / Simon Kainzwaldner	Italy	43.552	45.065	45.300	2:13.917	+0.774
4	3–1; 3–2; 3–3	Olena Stetskiv; Andriy Mandziy; Ihor Hoi / Myroslav Levkovych	Ukraine	43.910	44.862	46.125	2:14.897	+1.754
5	1–1; 1–2; 1–3	Katarína Šimoňáková; Jozef Ninis; Tomáš Vaverčák / Matej Zmij	Slovakia	44.409	44.821	45.701	2:14.931	+1.788
	4–1; 4–2; 4–3	Madeleine Egle; Nico Gleirscher; Juri Gatt / Riccardo Schöpf	Austria	43.249	44.671	Did not finish		
	5–1; 5–2; 5–3	Klaudia Domaradzka; Mateusz Sochowicz; Wojciech Chmielewski / Jakub Kowalewski	Poland	Disqualified				
