= Luge at the 2022 Winter Olympics – Women's singles =

Luge women's singles at the XXIV Olympic Winter Games
- Luge pictogram
- Venue: Xiaohaituo Bobsleigh and Luge Track
- Date: 7, 8 February 2022
- Competitors: 35 from 20 nations

Medalists
1st place, gold medalist(s)		Natalie Geisenberger	Germany
2nd place, silver medalist(s)		Anna Berreiter	Germany
3rd place, bronze medalist(s)		Tatiana Ivanova	ROC

The women's singles competition in luge at the 2022 Winter Olympics was held on 7 February (heats 1 and 2) and 8 February (heats 3 and 4), at the Xiaohaituo Bobsleigh and Luge Track in Yanqing District. The defending champion Natalie Geisenberger of Germany won the event, becoming the first ever triple Olympic champion in women's luge. This was her fifth Olympic gold medal. Her compatriot Anna Berreiter won the silver medal, and Tatiana Ivanova, representing the Russian Olympic Committee, the bronze. This was the first Olympic medal for Berreiter and first individual medal for Ivanova, who already has the silver for the 2014 team relay.

In the 2021–22 Luge World Cup, Geisenberger was third, though she won the last race of the season before the Olympics. Julia Taubitz won the World Cup, with Madeleine Egle finishing second. The silver medalist at the 2018 Olympics, Dajana Eitberger, missed a season due to childbirth; she then returned to competitions, but finished outside of the top-10 in the World Cup and did not qualify for the Olympics. The 2018 bronze medalist, Alex Gough, retired from competitions.

Taubitz won the first run, setting the track record, but crashed in the second run, dropping out of the medal contention. Egle made a mistake in the first run, and after two runs was only seventh. This left Geisenberger in lead after two runs, with Anna Berreiter second and Tatiana Ivanova third. In the third run, Geisenberger set the new track record. Whereas Egle managed to fight back to the fourth position, the last run did not change the medal distribution.

== Qualification ==
The qualification is based on the cumulative points of the Olympic Season from 1 July 2021 to January 10, 2022. A total of 35 quota spots are available to athletes to compete at the games. Each NOC can enter a maximum of three athletes.

In the women's singles, all nations with an athlete in the top 40 qualified one slot. If there were remaining spots left, the second best athlete of each nation in the top 32 was awarded an additional quota, with the third best being awarded a quota if there were any remaining spots.

On December 17, 2021, the International Luge Federation announced that the qualification system was changed. The qualification system was changed due to training runs being cancelled at the first World Cup, and equipment not being delivered to the following World Cups. The new system will see athletes qualify based on their top four results during the World Cup season, (as opposed to the previous all seven results counting).

On January 19, 2022 the International Luge Federation announced the list of qualified athletes.

=== Summary ===
Number of sleds	Athletes total	Nation
3	21	Germany; Austria; United States; ROC; Latvia; Italy; Canada
2	2	Ukraine
1	12	Switzerland; Romania; South Korea; Slovakia; Sweden; China; Argentina; Poland (Note: quota allocated to participate in the team relay.); Czech Republic; Chinese Taipei (Note: allocation according to rule D3.1 for sleds outside of the top 40.); ~~Netherlands~~; Moldova; Ireland
35	35	

== Results ==
Rank	Bib	Athlete	Country	Run 1	Rank	Run 2	Rank	Run 3	Rank	Run 4	Rank	Total	Behind
1st place, gold medalist(s)	1	Natalie Geisenberger	Germany	58.402	2	58.423	1	58.226 TR	1	58.403	2	3:53.454	0.000
2nd place, silver medalist(s)	3	Anna Berreiter	Germany	58.525	4	58.508	3	58.348	2	58.566	4	3:53.947	+0.493
3rd place, bronze medalist(s)	6	Tatiana Ivanova	ROC	58.733	5	58.683	4	58.461	3	58.630	5	3:54.507	+1.053
4	2	Madeleine Egle	Austria	59.342	17	58.493	2	58.542	5	58.432	3	3:54.809	+1.355
5	12	Hannah Prock	Austria	58.762	6	58.732	5	58.532	4	58.798	9	3:54.824	+1.370
6	10	Lisa Schulte	Austria	58.523	3	59.074	12	58.646	6	58.642	6	3:54.885	+1.431
7	5	Julia Taubitz	Germany	58.345 TR	1	1:00.075	26	58.655	7	58.358	1	3:55.433	+1.979
8	9	Elīza Tīruma	Latvia	58.956	8	58.849	6	58.865	11	58.771	8	3:55.441	+1.987
9	18	Natalie Maag	Switzerland	59.018	11	59.117	13	58.913	14	58.892	10	3:55.940	+2.486
10	8	Andrea Vötter	Italy	59.145	14	59.045	10	58.852	10	58.935	11	3:55.977	+2.523
11	28	Kendija Aparjode	Latvia	59.107	13	59.020	7	58.928	15	59.084	12	3:56.139	+2.685
12	24	Ashley Farquharson	United States	59.972	26	59.024	8	58.768	8	58.643	7	3:56.407	+2.953
13	19	Verena Hofer	Italy	58.960	9	59.037	9	58.961	16	59.584	16	3:56.542	+3.088
14	15	Trinity Ellis	Canada	59.219	16	59.053	11	58.888	13	59.704	17	3:56.864	+3.410
15	13	Nina Zöggeler	Italy	59.464	18	59.160	16	59.085	19	59.275	14	3:56.984	+3.530
16	29	Natalie Corless	Canada	59.193	15	59.316	17	59.176	21	59.570	15	3:57.255	+3.801
17	17	Makena Hodgson	Canada	59.505	19	59.477	18	59.286	22	59.268	13	3:57.536	+4.082
18	4	Elīna Ieva Vītola	Latvia	59.025	12	59.140	14	59.029	17	1:00.957	18	3:58.151	+4.697
19	26	Aileen Frisch	South Korea	59.776	23	59.642	20	59.055	18	1:01.811	19	4:00.284	+6.830
20	30	Tove Kohala	Sweden	59.533	20	59.776	21	59.333	23	1:02.431	20	4:01.073	+7.619
21	25	Yulianna Tunytska	Ukraine	59.690	22	59.844	23	59.571	24	Did not advance		2:59.105	N/A
22	20	Olena Stetskiv	Ukraine	59.663	21	59.586	19	59.963	27	Did not advance		2:59.212	N/A
23	23	Summer Britcher	United States	1:00.986	29	59.156	15	59.152	20	Did not advance		2:59.294	N/A
24	34	Verónica María Ravenna	Argentina	59.811	24	59.780	22	59.719	25	Did not advance		2:59.310	N/A
25	21	Katarína Šimoňáková	Slovakia	1:00.124	27	59.851	24	59.761	26	Did not advance		2:59.736	N/A
26	14	Emily Sweeney	United States	58.971	10	1:02.439	32	58.882	12	Did not advance		3:00.292	N/A
27	22	Klaudia Domaradzka	Poland	59.871	25	59.892	25	1:01.313	31	Did not advance		3:01.076	N/A
28	11	Victoria Demchenko	ROC	58.869	7	1:03.466	33	58.838	9	Did not advance		3:01.173	N/A
29	32	Wang Peixuan	China	1:00.986	29	1:00.391	28	1:00.025	28	Did not advance		3:01.402	N/A
30	31	Anna Čežíková	Czech Republic	1:00.392	28	1:01.169	30	1:00.101	29	Did not advance		3:01.662	N/A
31	33	Lin Sin-Rong	Chinese Taipei	1:01.550	32	1:01.057	29	1:01.004	30	Did not advance		3:03.611	N/A
32	35	Doina Descalui	Moldova	1:01.928	34	1:02.192	31	1:02.174	32	Did not advance		3:06.294	N/A
33	27	Elsa Desmond	Ireland	1:01.608	33	1:03.857	34	1:02.254	33	Did not advance		3:07.719	N/A
	16	Raluca Strămăturaru	Romania	1:01:357	31	1:00.305	27	Did not finish					
	7	Ekaterina Katnikova	ROC	Did not finish									
