= Aiva Aparjode =

Latvian luger (born 1977)

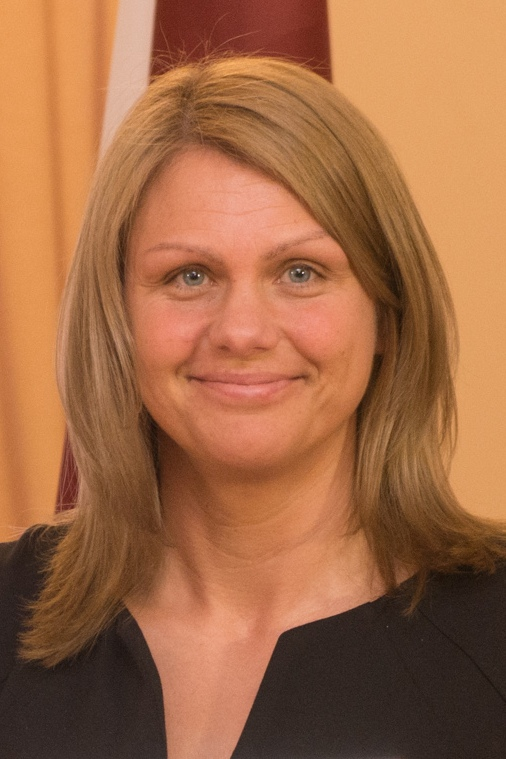
Aiva Aparjode in 2015

Aiva Aparjode (born 18 February 1977) is a Latvian luger who competed from 1998 to 2006. She finished 18th in the women's singles event at the 2006 Winter Olympics in Turin. Aparjode's best finish at the FIL World Luge Championships was 17th at Nagano in 2004. Her son, Kristers Aparjods, and daughter, Kendija Aparjode, also are lugers who have represented Latvia internationally.
