= Luge at the 2020 Winter Youth Olympics – Team relay =

Team relay at the III Winter Youth Olympic Games
- Venue: St. Moritz-Celerina Olympic Bobrun
- Dates: 20 January
- Competitors: 48 from 15 nations
- Teams: 12
- Winning time: 2:54.072

Medalists
1st place, gold medalist(s)		Diana Loginova; Pavel Repilov; Mikhail Karnaukhov; Iurii Chirva	Russia
2nd place, silver medalist(s)		Merle Fräbel; Timon Grancagnolo; Moritz Jäger; Valentin Steudte	Germany
3rd place, bronze medalist(s)		Justīne Maskale; Gints Bērziņš; Kaspars Rinks; Ardis Liepiņš	Latvia

The team relay luge at the 2020 Winter Youth Olympics took place on 20 January at the St. Moritz-Celerina Olympic Bobrun.

== Results ==
The event was started at 09:30.

Rank	Bib	Athlete	Country	Women's singles	Men's singles	Doubles	Total	Behind
1st place, gold medalist(s)	12–1; 12–2; 12–3	Diana Loginova; Pavel Repilov; Mikhail Karnaukhov / Iurii Chirva	Russia	56.632	58.266	59.174	2:54.072	
2nd place, silver medalist(s)	13–1; 13–2; 13–3	Merle Fräbel; Timon Grancagnolo; Moritz Jäger / Valentin Steudte	Germany	56.598	58.812	59.212	2:54.622	+0.550
3rd place, bronze medalist(s)	11–1; 11–2; 11–3	Justīne Maskale; Gints Bērziņš; Kaspars Rinks / Ardis Liepiņš	Latvia	57.477	57.908	59.569	2:54.954	+0.882
4	10–1; 10–2; 10–3	Kailey Allan (CAN); Alex Gufler (ITA); Caitlin Nash / Natalie Corless (CAN)	Mixed-NOCs	57.718	58.918	1:00.991	2:57.627	+3.555
5	2–1; 2–2; 2–3	Corina Buzățoiu; Darius Şerban; Răzvan Turea / Sebastian Motzca	Romania	57.941	1:00.016	1:00.325	2:58.282	+4.210
6	4–1; 4–2; 4–3	Yulianna Tunytska; Oleh-Roman Pylypiv; Vadym Mykyievych / Bohdan Babura	Ukraine	57.766	59.748	1:01.230	2:58.744	+4.672
7	9–1; 9–2; 9–3	McKenna Mazlo; Matthew Greiner; Maya Chan / Reannyn Weiler	United States	58.047	59.955	1:01.177	2:59.179	+5.107
8	6–1; 6–2; 6–3	Ella Cox (NZL); Hunter Burke (NZL); Yang Shih-hsun / Yeh Meng-jhe (TPE)	Mixed-NOCs	59.137	1:00.747	1:01.061	3:00.945	+6.873
9	8–1; 8–2; 8–3	Anna Bryk; Marcin Kiełbasa; Kacper Imiołek / Łukasz Maćkała	Poland	58.970	1:02.947	1:00.868	3:02.785	+8.713
10	3–1; 3–2; 3–3	Anna Čežíková; Jakub Vepřovský; Markéta Nováková / Anna Vejdělková	Czech Republic	59.352	1:02.086	1:02.126	3:03.564	+9.492
11	1–1; 1–2; 1–3	Yuki Ishikawa (JPN); Marius Goncear (MDA); Adriana Adam / Aliona Busuioc (MDA)	Mixed-NOCs	59.947	1:02.221	1:03.587	3:05.755	+11.683
	7–1; 7–2; 7–3	Nikola Trembošová; Dávid Lihoň; Vratislav Varga / Metod Majerčák	Slovakia	Disqualified				
	5–1; 5–2; 5–3	Ema Kovačič (SLO); Bao Zhenyu (CHN); Lovro Kovačič / Tian Badžukov (SLO)	Mixed-NOCs	Did not start				
