= Anna Berreiter =

German luger (born 1999)

- Berreiter in 2026

Personal information
- Nationality: German
- Born: 3 September 1999 (age 27) Berchtesgaden, Germany
- Height: 168 cm (5 ft 6 in)
- Weight: 72 kg (159 lb)
- Website: annaberreiter.de

Sport
- Country: Germany
- Sport: Luge
- Event: Singles
- Club: RC Berchtesgaden
- Coached by: Patric Leitner

Achievements and titles
- Highest world ranking: 2nd in Luge World Cup (2023–24)
Medal record
Women's luge
Representing Germany
Olympic Games
Silver medal – second place	2022 Beijing	Singles
World Championships
Gold medal – first place	2023 Oberhof	Singles
Gold medal – first place	2023 Oberhof	Team relay
Silver medal – second place	2021 Königssee	Sprint
Bronze medal – third place	2023 Oberhof	Sprint
European Championships
Gold medal – first place	2023 Sigulda	Singles
Silver medal – second place	2023 Sigulda	Team relay
Bronze medal – third place	2024 Igls	Singles
World Cup
Event	1st	2nd	3rd
Singles	5	7	6
Sprint	0	0	2
Team relay	5	4	0
Total	10	11	8
- Updated as of 8 March 2026

Anna Berreiter (born 3 September 1999) is a German luger. She is the 2023 World and European Champion and silver medallist at the 2022 Winter Olympics. A two-time Under-23 World Champion, Berreiter was also part of the German squad that took the World team relay title in 2023 and has won further 1 silver and 1 bronze medals in sprint discipline at the World Championships level. She is the youngest woman to win a Luge World Cup race, and so far, has won 5 individual races in her World Cup career.

== Career ==
Berreiter started luge when she was eight years old. She is a member of the RC Berchtesgaden club.

=== Youth and junior career ===
Berreiter represented her country at various age categories. She made her debut in the Youth-A World Cup in December 2015 in her home track Königssee. She finished the first race in second-place while her teammates completed all-German top 5. After a mediocre ninth-place in Innsbruck, she won the other two races of the season in Altenberg and Oberhof. In the following season, Berreiter was promoted to the Junior World Cup but she was unable to fully match her impressive youth performance in her new age group. She was 16th in her first race in Innsbruck, and finished 5th and 6th respectively in Oberhof and Winterberg.

In the 2017/18 season, after fifth-place finishes at the opening two races in Oberhof, Berreiter was runner-up to Jessica Tiebel in Königssee and reached her first podium in the junior level. In the following two races in Innsbruck, she achieved two more podium results by finishing third in both. She was 6th in the last World Cup race of the season in Winterberg, which was also the Junior European Championships, and finished the season in third-place in the overall standings behind Cheyenne Rosenthal and Lisa Schulte. At the 2018 Junior World Championships in Altenberg, Berreiter missed the medals and finished 5th despite recording the 2nd best time in her second run.

Berreiter made a very successful start to her last junior season by winning the two singles races in Park City, as well as the two team relay races. In the following race in Calgary she was second by only 0.002 seconds, and she grabbed her fourth consecutive junior World Cup podium at the Junior European Championship race in St. Moritz with a third-place finish. She was behind two other European athletes and therefore won the bronze medal, which was her first ever international medal in any age group. In the team relay, she won the European title with her teammates David Nößler, Hannes Orlamünder and Paul Gubitz. In the Junior World Cup tour; Berreiter was the overall leader by 69 points before the season finale in Oberhof, but she gave away the title to Tatiana Tcvetova after crashing out in the first run, and dropped to third place in the overall rankings.

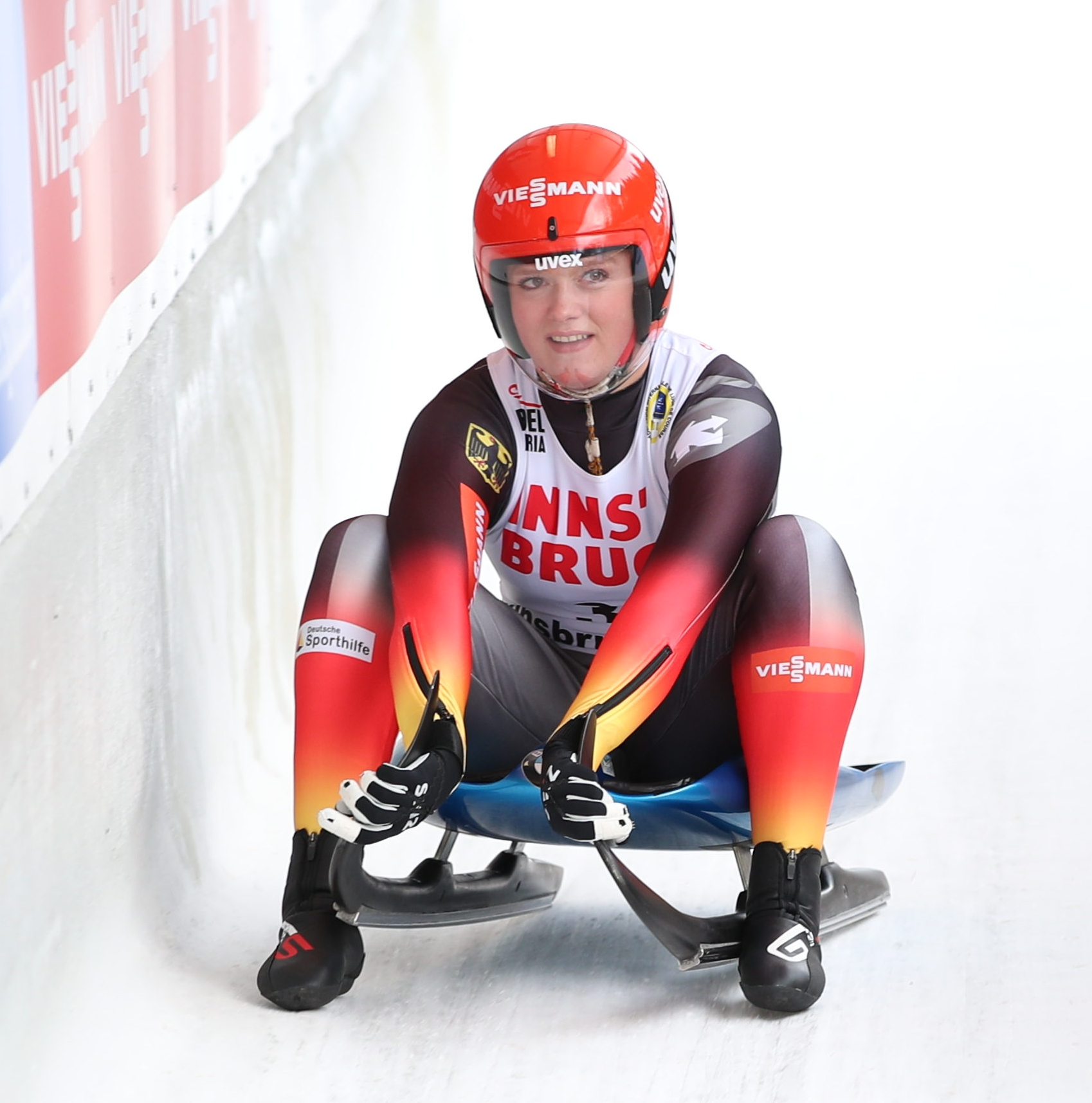
Berreiter at her first ever World Cup race in Innsbruck in 2019

=== Senior career ===
==== 2019/20 season: World Cup debut and first victory ====
Berreiter advanced to the German senior World Cup team in 2019/20 season following the retirement of Tatjana Hüfner and the maternity leaves of the Olympic medalists Natalie Geisenberger and Dajana Eitberger. She made her World Cup debut on 23 November 2019 in Innsbruck, the first race of the season, and finished the race in seventh-place. Before the third stage of the season in Whistler, Berreiter – as a newcomer – had to qualify for the main race through the Nations Cup due to her lack of sufficient World Cup points from the previous races. In Whistler, despite her little experience in North American tracks, she was able to win the Nations Cup race and earned her first success in senior level. In the singles race she finished second to Tatiana Ivanova and reached the first World Cop podium of her career in her 3rd ever World Cup singles race. She followed that up with a fifth-place finish in the sprint race which was her seasons best in this discipline.

On 2 February 2020, Berreiter celebrated her first World Cup victory in Oberhof. She became the youngest ever female luger to win a World Cup race at the age of 20 years and 152 days, overtaking Natalie Geisenberger who won her first race when she was 20 years and 313 days. After setting the fastest time in both of the runs in the singles race, Berreiter earned her spot in the team relay squad and helped Germany to capture their first team relay victory of the season.

== Luge results ==
All results are sourced from the International Luge Federation (FIL) and German Bobsleigh, Luge and Skeleton Federation (BSD).

=== Olympic Games ===
- 1 medal (1 silver)

Event	Age	Singles	Team relay
(China) 2022 Beijing	22	Silver	—
(Italy) 2026 Milano Cortina	26	6th	—

=== World Championships ===
- 4 medals (2 gold, 1 silver, 1 bronze)

Event	Age	Singles	Sprint	Team relay	Mixed singles
(Russia) 2020 Sochi	20	6th	9th	—	—N/a
(Germany) 2021 Königssee	21	4th	Silver	—	—N/a
(Germany) 2023 Oberhof	23	Gold	Bronze	Gold	—N/a
(Germany) 2024 Altenberg	24	—	13th	—	—N/a
(Canada) 2025 Whistler	25	11th	—N/a	—	—

=== World Cup ===
Season	Singles									Sprint			Team relay						Mixed singles			Points	Overall	Singles	Sprint
Season	1	2	3	4	5	6	7	8	9	1	2	3	1	2	3	4	5	6	1	2	3	Points	Overall	Singles	Sprint
2019–20	7	15	2	10	13	10	1	5	1	11	5	11	–	–	–	1	–	1	—N/a			637	4th	—N/a	7th
2020–21	–	–	–	9	4	17	3	–	–	–	13	–	–	–	–	–	–	CNX	—N/a			223	19th	19th	20th
2021–22	4	1	4	3	4	4	10	3	7	5	3	10	–	2	–	–	–	–	—N/a			723	4th	4th	4th
2022–23	5	5	4	4	1	2	2	3	3	9	5	5	–	–	2	–	–	2	—N/a			789	3rd	3rd	6th
2023–24	7	2	4	3	4	4	2	1	2	10	3	11	–	1	–	–	–	1	—N/a			791	2nd	2nd	8th
2024–25	14	5	7	8	2	6	6	8	11	—N/a			CNX	–	–	2	–	–	–	–	–	426	—N/a	6th	—N/a
2025–26	4	11	8	8	6	4	5	9	5	—N/a			–	5	–	1	–	–	–	–	–	437	—N/a	5th	—N/a

=== European Championships ===
- 2020 Lillehammer – 11th in Singles ( (bronze) in U23 category)
- 2021 Sigulda – 14th in Singles (4th in U23 category)
- 2022 St. Moritz – 7th in Singles ( (silver) in U23 category)
- 2023 Sigulda – (gold) in Singles, (silver) in Team relay
- 2024 Innsbruck – (bronze) in Singles
- 2025 Winterberg – 5th in Singles
- 2026 Oberhof – 4th in Singles

=== U23 World Championships ===
- 2020 Sochi – (gold) in Singles
- 2021 Königssee – (gold) in Singles

=== Junior World Championships ===
- 2018 Altenberg – 5th in Singles

=== Junior European Championships ===
- 2017 Oberhof – 5th in Singles
- 2018 Winterberg – 6th in Singles
- 2019 St. Moritz – (bronze) in Singles, (gold) in Team Relay

=== German Championships ===
- 2018 Winterberg – 6th in Singles
- 2019 Oberhof – (silver) in Singles
- 2020 Königssee – 5th in Singles
- 2021 Altenberg – (silver) in Singles
- 2022 Oberhof – (gold) in Singles
- 2023 Altenberg – (gold) in Singles
- 2024 Winterberg – (gold) in Singles
