= Merle Fräbel =

German luger (born 2003)

- Fräbel in 2026

Personal information
- Nationality: German
- Born: 11 June 2003 (age 23) Suhl, Germany
- Height: 187 cm (6 ft 2 in)

Sport
- Country: Germany
- Sport: Luge
- Event: Singles
- Club: RT Suhl
- Coached by: Jan-Armin Eichhorn
Medal record
Women's luge
Representing Germany
World Championships
Silver medal – second place	2025 Whistler	Singles
European Championships
Gold medal – first place	2026 Oberhof	Singles
Gold medal – first place	2026 Oberhof	Team relay
Silver medal – second place	2026 Oberhof	Mixed singles
Winter Youth Olympic Games
Gold medal – first place	2020 Lausanne	Singles
Silver medal – second place	2020 Lausanne	Team
Junior World Championships
Bronze medal – third place	2022 Winterberg	Singles

Merle Fräbel (born 11 June 2003) is a German luger. She is the Under-23 World Champion, and Winter Youth Olympics champion in luge singles discipline.

== Career ==
=== Junior and youth career ===
Merle Fräbel started her luge career at the age of eight. At the Youth Olympic Games in Lausanne 2020, she achieved her greatest success in the youth and junior divisions, winning gold in the singles and silver in the team relay. She was the first German female luger to win a gold medal at the Youth Olympic Games. In the following season, 2021/22, she won the overall World Cup in both the singles and the team in the Junior World Cup. She won the bronze medal at the 2022 Junior World Championships in Winterberg.

=== Senior career ===
Merle Fräbel started her Luge World Cup debut races in the 2022/23 season after good results in the German qualifying races, in which she won three of the four races. At the 2023 Luge World Championships on her home track in Oberhof, she took fourth place in the sprint. In the singles, she was fifth and also secured the U23 World Championship gold medal.

== Luge results ==
All results are sourced from the International Luge Federation (FIL) and German Bobsleigh, Luge and Skeleton Federation (BSD).

=== Olympic Games ===
Event	Age	Singles	Team relay
(Italy) 2026 Milano Cortina	22	8	—

=== World Championships ===
1 medal (1 silver)

Year	Age	Singles	Sprint	Team relay	Mixed singles
(Germany) 2023 Oberhof	19	5th	4th	—	—N/a
(Germany) 2024 Altenberg	20	—	7th	—	—N/a
(Canada) 2025 Whistler	21	Silver	—N/a	—	DSQ

=== World Cup ===
Season	Singles									Sprint			Team relay						Mixed singles			Points	Overall	Singles	Sprint
Season	1	2	3	4	5	6	7	8	9	1	2	3	1	2	3	4	5	6	1	2	3	Points	Overall	Singles	Sprint
2022–23	6	3	11	–	4	9	6	6	12	5	12	3	–	–	–	–	–	–	—N/a			542	6th	7th	5th
2023–24	14	3	12	14	7	1	6	9	3	14	4	4	–	–	–	–	1	–	—N/a			611	7th	6th	6th
2024–25	5	8	4	2	3	5	4	2	3	—N/a			CNX	–	1	Altenberg	–	Yanqing	3	1	2	582	—N/a	4th	—N/a

Standings through 29 January 2024

=== U23 World Championships ===
- 2023 Oberhof – (gold) in Singles

=== Junior World Championships ===
- 2022 Winterberg - (bronze) in Singles

=== Junior European Championships ===
- 2023 Sigulda - (silver) in Singles
