= Luge at the 2026 Winter Olympics =

Luge at the XXV Olympic Winter Games
- Luge pictogram
- Venue: Cortina Sliding Centre
- Dates: 7–12 February 2026
- No. of events: 5 (2 men, 2 women, 1 mixed)
- Competitors: 106 from 19 nations

Luge at the 2026 Winter Olympics was held at the Cortina Sliding Centre in Cortina d'Ampezzo between 7 and 12 February 2026.

== Competition schedule ==
The following was the competition schedule for all four events.

All times are in local time (UTC+1).

Date	Time	Event
7 February	17:00	Men's singles – Heats 1 and 2
8 February	17:00	Men's singles – Heats 3 and 4
9 February	17:00	Women's singles – Heats 1 and 2
10 February	17:00	Women's singles – Heats 3 and 4
11 February	17:00	Men's and women's doubles
12 February	18:30	Team relay

== Participating nations ==
A total of 106 athletes from 19 nations qualified to participate.

- Argentina (1)
- Australia (1)
- Austria (12)
- Canada (6)
- China (6)
- Czech Republic (1)
- Germany (12)
- Individual Neutral Athletes (2)
- Italy (12)
- Japan (1)
- Latvia (9)
- Poland (6)
- Romania (7)
- Slovakia (5)
- South Korea (1)
- Sweden (2)
- Switzerland (1)
- Ukraine (9)
- United States (11)

== Medal summary ==
=== Medal table ===
* Host nation (Italy)

Rank	Nation	Gold	Silver	Bronze	Total
1	Germany	3	1	1	5
2	Italy*	2	0	2	4
3	Austria	0	3	1	4
4	Latvia	0	1	0	1
5	United States	0	0	1	1
Totals (5 entries)		5	5	5	15

=== Events ===
Event	Gold		Silver		Bronze	
Men's singles	Max Langenhan; Germany	3:31.191	Jonas Müller; Austria	3:31.787	Dominik Fischnaller; Italy	3:32.125
Women's singles	Julia Taubitz; Germany	3:30.625	Elīna Ieva Bota; Latvia	3:31.543	Ashley Farquharson; United States	3:31.582
Men's doubles	Italy; Emanuel Rieder; Simon Kainzwaldner	1:45.086	Austria; Thomas Steu; Wolfgang Kindl	1:45.154	Germany; Tobias Wendl; Tobias Arlt	1:45.176
Women's doubles	Italy; Andrea Vötter; Marion Oberhofer	1:46.284	Germany; Dajana Eitberger; Magdalena Matschina	1:46.404	Austria; Selina Egle; Lara Kipp	1:46.543
Team relay	Germany; Julia Taubitz; Tobias Wendl; Tobias Arlt; Max Langenhan; Dajana Eitberger; Magdalena Matschina	3:41.672	Austria; Lisa Schulte; Thomas Steu; Wolfgang Kindl; Jonas Müller; Selina Egle; Lara Kipp	3:42.214	Italy; Verena Hofer; Emanuel Rieder; Simon Kainzwaldner; Dominik Fischnaller; Andrea Vötter; Marion Oberhofer	3:42.521
