= Kendija Aparjode =

Latvian luger (born 1996)

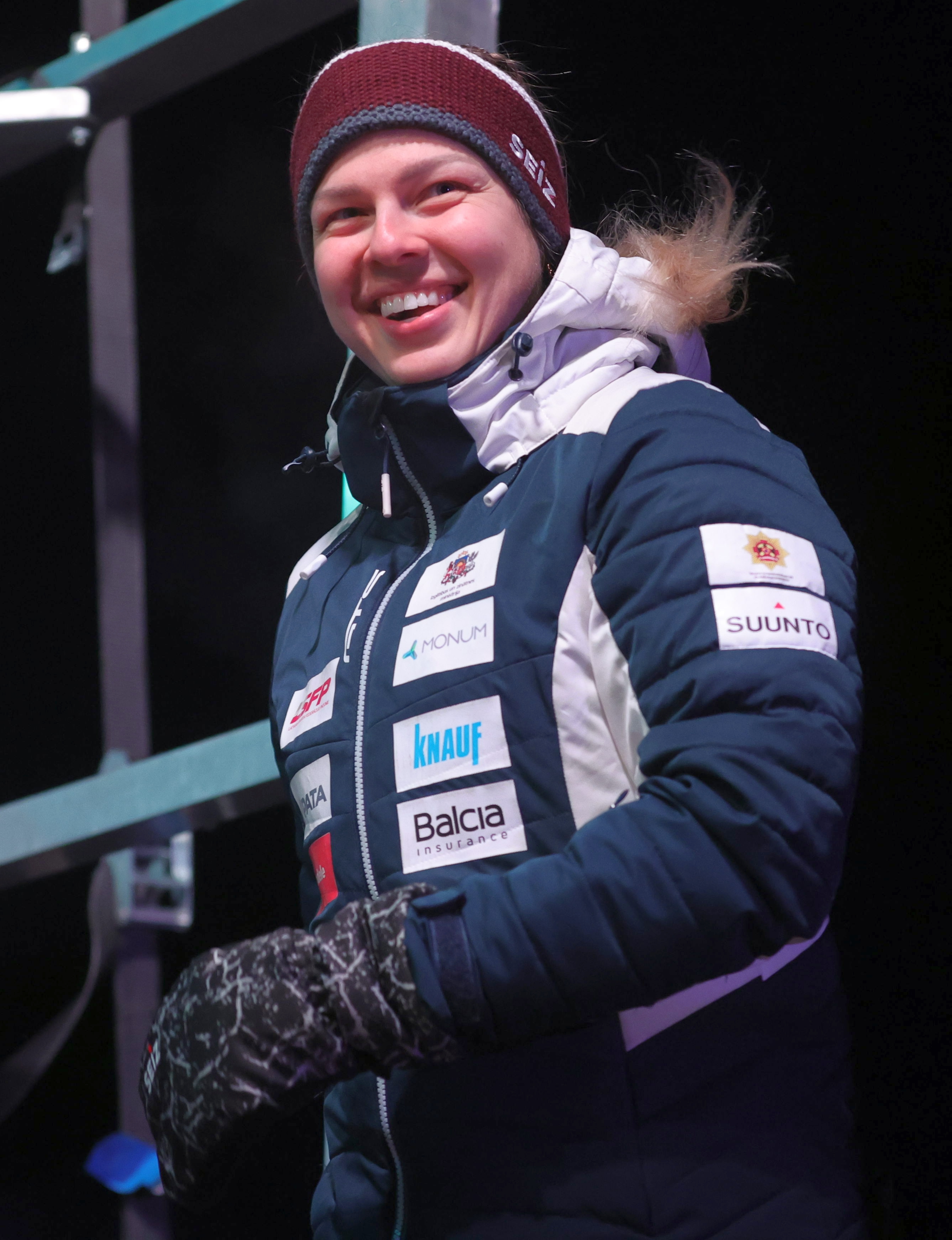
- Aparjode in 2024

Personal information
- Nationality: Latvian
- Born: 24 December 1996 (age 29) Sigulda, Latvia
- Height: 1.79 m (5 ft 10 in)
- Weight: 75 kg (165 lb)

Sport
- Country: Latvia
- Sport: Luge
- Event: Singles
- Coached by: Kaspars Dumpis
Medal record
Women's luge
Representing Latvia
World Championships
Silver medal – second place	2020 Sochi	Team relay
Bronze medal – third place	2021 Königssee	Team relay
Bronze medal – third place	2023 Oberhof	Team relay
European Championships
Bronze medal – third place	2018 Sigulda	Team relay
European Junior Championships
Silver medal – second place	2015 Oberhof	Team relay

Kendija Aparjode (born 24 December 1996) is a Latvian luger, who competed at the Winter Olympics in 2018, 2022, and 2026; her best result was an 11th-place finish in the women's singles race in 2022.

She started competing in the sport at the age of 13 and was part of the Latvian team that took the silver medal in the team relay at the 2015 European Junior Championships in Oberhof, Germany. She is the daughter of luger Aiva Aparjode and the sister of luger Kristers Aparjods.

== Career results ==
=== Winter Olympics ===
Year	Event	Singles
2022	Pyeongchang, South Korea	22
2022	Beijing, China	11
2026	Cortina d'Ampezzo, Italy	16

=== World Championships ===
Year	Event	Singles	Sprint	Mixed Singles	Team Relay
2017	Innsbruck, Austria	20	—N/a	—N/a	—N/a
2019	Winterberg, Germany	11	—N/a	—N/a	—N/a
2020	Sochi, Russia	4	6	—N/a	2
2021	Königssee, Germany	8	13	—N/a	3
2023	Oberhof, Germany	8	7	—N/a	3
2024	Altenberg, Germany	6	5	—N/a	—N/a
2025	Whistler, Canada	8	—N/a	8	—N/a
