= Tove Kohala =

Swedish luger (born 2001)

- Kohala in 2026

Personal information
- Full name: Tove Britt Ingeborg Kohala
- Born: 29 January 2001 (age 25) Österåker, Sweden

Sport
- Country: Sweden
- Sport: Luge

Tove Britt Ingeborg Kohala (born 29 January 2001) is a Swedish luger who competes internationally.

== Career ==
She represented her country at the 2022 Winter Olympics and 2026 Winter Olympics.

Her father, Hans, competed in the luge doubles event at the 1992 and 1994 Winter Olympics. Her brother, Svante, also competed at the 2022 Winter Olympics in the men's singles event in luge.

== Career results ==
=== Winter Olympics ===
Year	Event	Singles
2022	Beijing, China	20
2026	Cortina d'Ampezzo, Italy	19

=== World Championships ===
Year	Event	Singles	Mixed Singles
2017	Innsbruck, Austria	41	—N/a
2021	Königssee, Germany	32	—N/a
2023	Oberhof, Germany	23	—N/a
2024	Altenberg, Germany	27	—N/a
2025	Whistler, Canada	23	17
