= 2023 FIL European Luge Championships =

Championship held in Sigulda, Latvia

- Venue: Sigulda bobsleigh, luge, and skeleton track
- Location: Sigulda, Latvia
- Dates: 14–15 January

The 2023 FIL European Luge Championships were held from 14 to 15 January 2023 in Sigulda, Latvia.

== Schedule ==
Five events were held.

All times are local (UTC+2).

Date	Time	Events
14 January	10:00	1st run Doubles Men
14 January	10:46	1st run Doubles Women
14 January	11:30	2nd run Doubles Men
14 January	12:15	2nd run Doubles Women
14 January	13:10	1st run Men
14 January	14:35	2nd run Men
15 January	10:15	1st run Women
15 January	11:45	2nd run Women
15 January	13:45	Team relay

== Medal summary ==
=== Medal table ===
* Host nation (Latvia)

Rank	Nation	Gold	Silver	Bronze	Total
1	Germany	3	3	1	7
2	Latvia*	1	2	3	6
3	Italy	1	0	1	2
Totals (3 entries)		5	5	5	15

=== Medalists ===
Event	Gold		Silver		Bronze	
Men's singles	Max Langenhan; Germany	1:37.588	Felix Loch; Germany	1:37.646	Kristers Aparjods; Latvia	1:37.673
Women's singles	Anna Berreiter; Germany	1:24.600	Dajana Eitberger; Germany	1:24.631	Elīna Ieva Vītola; Latvia	1:24.637
Men's doubles	Germany; Tobias Wendl; Tobias Arlt	1:24.022	Latvia; Mārtiņš Bots; Roberts Plūme	1:24.084	Latvia; Eduards Ševics-Mikeļševics; Lūkass Krasts	1:24.111
Women's doubles	Italy; Andrea Vötter; Marion Oberhofer	1:26.281	Latvia; Anda Upīte; Sanija Ozoliņa	1:26.782	Germany; Jessica Degenhardt; Cheyenne Rosenthal	1:26.839
Team relay	Latvia; Elīna Ieva Vītola; Kristers Aparjods; Mārtiņš Bots / Roberts Plūme	2:13.143	Germany; Anna Berreiter; Max Langenhan; Tobias Wendl / Tobias Arlt	2:13.510	Italy; Sandra Robatscher; Dominik Fischnaller; Emanuel Rieder / Simon Kainzwaldner	2:13.917
