= Emily Fischnaller =

American luger (born 1993)

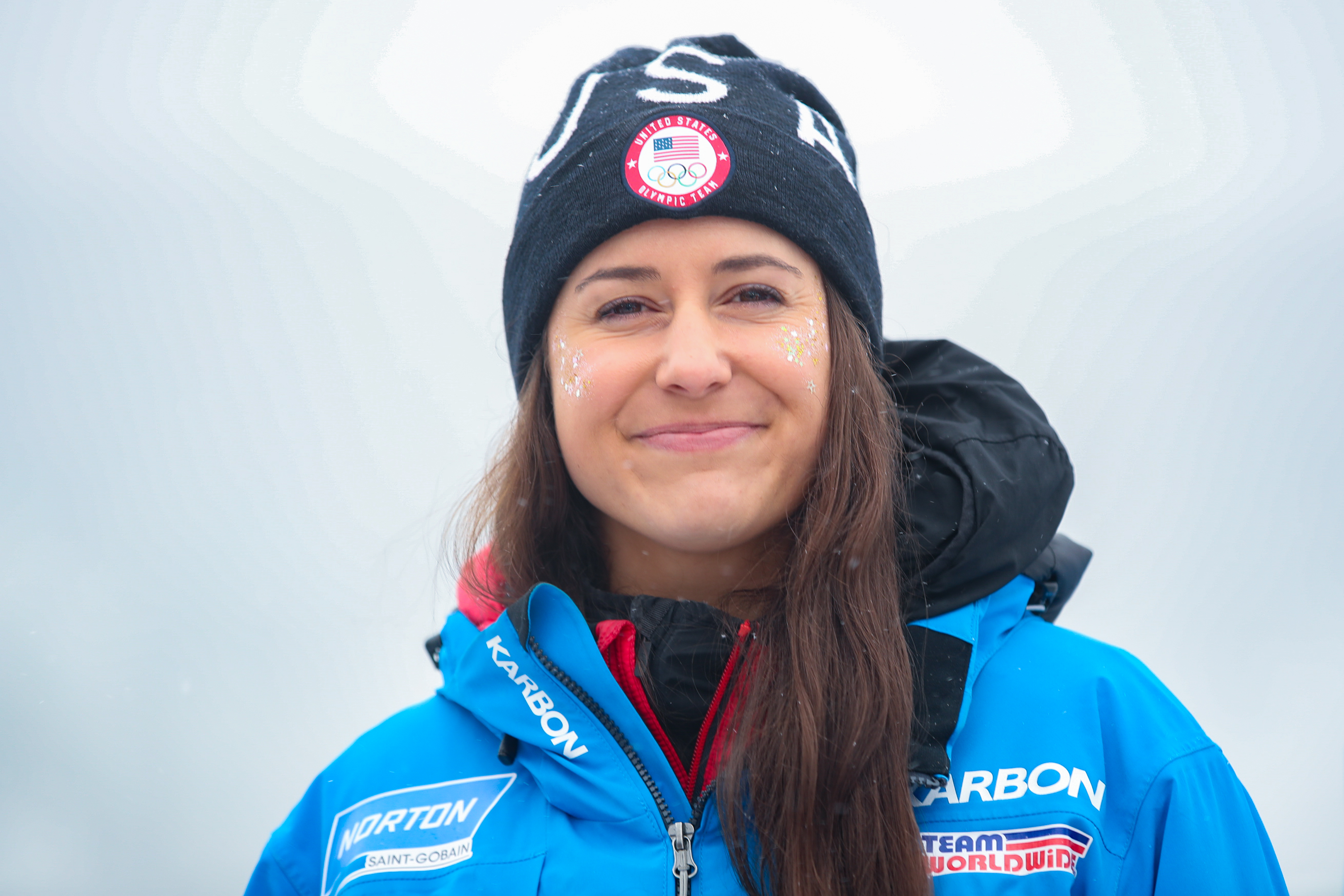
- Fischnaller in 2023

Personal information
- Full name: Emily Carolyn Fischnaller
- Born: March 16, 1993 (age 33) Portland, Maine, U.S.
- Height: 5 ft 5 in (1.64 m)
- Weight: 130 lb (59 kg)

Sport
- Country: United States
- Sport: Luge
- Event: Women's singles
- Club: U.S. Army WCAP
Medal record
World Championships
Silver medal – second place	2025 Whistler	Mixed singles
Bronze medal – third place	2019 Winterberg	Women's singles
Bronze medal – third place	2025 Whistler	Women's singles

Emily Carolyn Fischnaller (née Sweeney; born March 16, 1993) is an American luger. She is the sister of fellow luger Megan Sweeney.

== Luge career ==
During the 2009 World Cup season, Sweeney became Junior World Luge Champion and took bronze medals at the Junior World Cup at Winterberg, Germany and a gold medal at Park City, Utah.

On November 26, 2017, she won her first World Cup gold medal in the sprint race at Winterberg.

Emily Sweeney was selected as a member of the 2018 USA Olympic Team. At the Pyongchang Games, her first Olympics, Sweeney crashed on her final run, losing control at turn 12 of the Alpensia track after "(catching) a good amount of air" when entering the corner. The neck and back fractures she suffered were figured out some days later. Nine months after her accident, she came back and won a bronze medal at a World Cup race in Whistler, British Columbia.

At the 2026 Winter Olympics, she finished 12th in the Women's singles event.

== Personal life ==
Sweeney married Italian luger Dominik Fischnaller in May 2025. They both qualified for the 2026 Olympics.
