= Elsa Desmond =

Irish luger (born 1997)

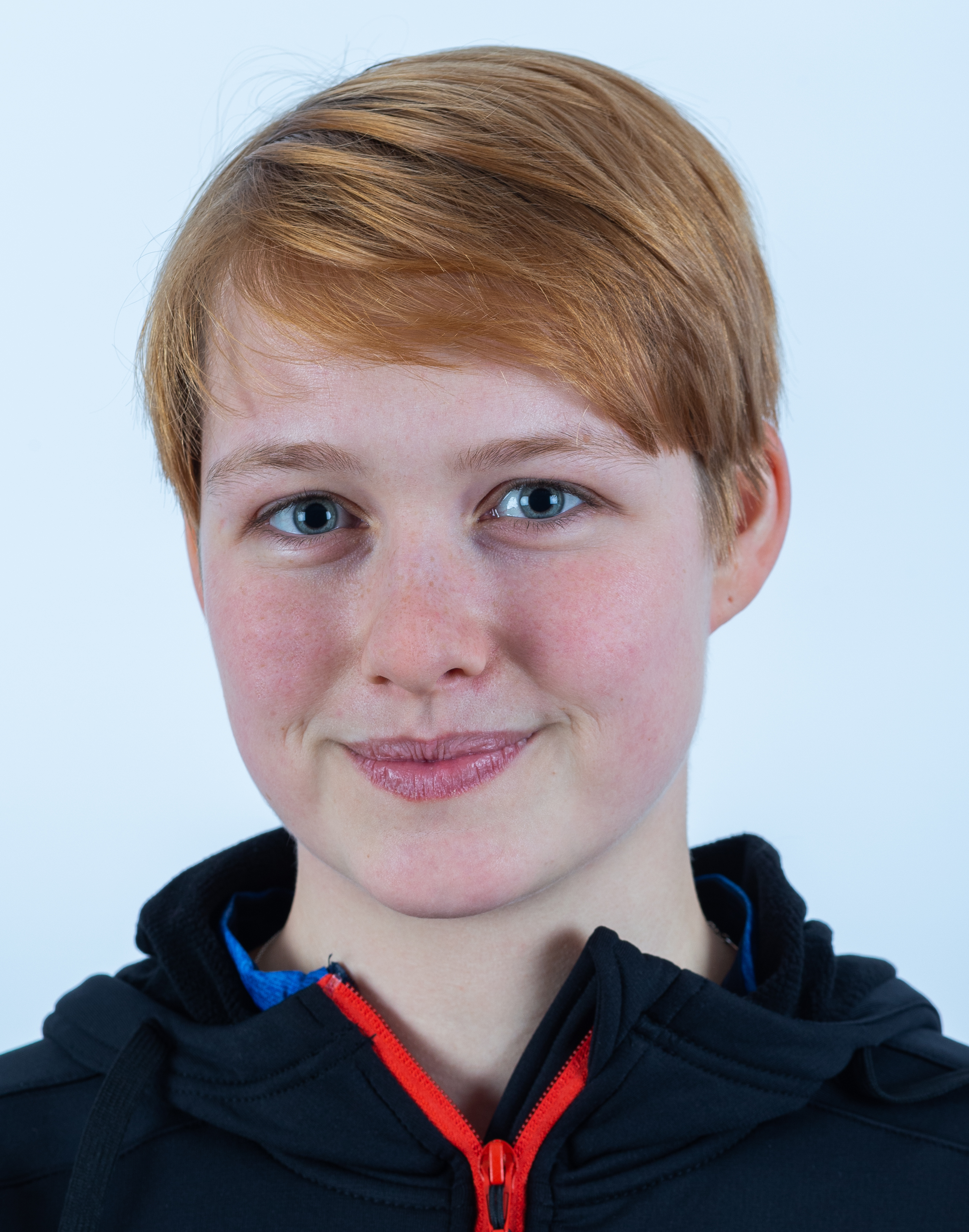
- Desmond in 2018

Personal information
- Born: 6 August 1997 (age 29) Buckingham, England
- Education: King's College London
- Years active: 2018–present

Sport
- Country: Ireland
- Sport: Luge
- Rank: 27th World Cup Overall Women's Singles Overall 2023/2024
- Event: Singles
- Coached by: Adam Rosen

Achievements and titles
- Olympic finals: 2022
- World finals: 2019 FIL World Luge Championships, 2021 FIL World Luge Championships, 2023 FIL World Luge Championships, 2024 FIL World Luge Championships
- Highest world ranking: 10th (2019 U23 World Championships)

Elsa Desmond (born 6 August 1997), nicknamed the "Flying Doctor" is an Irish luger. She was Irelands first Olympic luge athlete and the Irish flag bearer in the opening ceremony of the 2022 Winter Olympics.

== Early life ==
Desmond was born in Buckingham in 1997. Her paternal grandparents were from County Cavan and County Cork, Ireland. She grew up in England, India and Turkey, and was part of the University of London Air Squadron.

== Sporting career ==
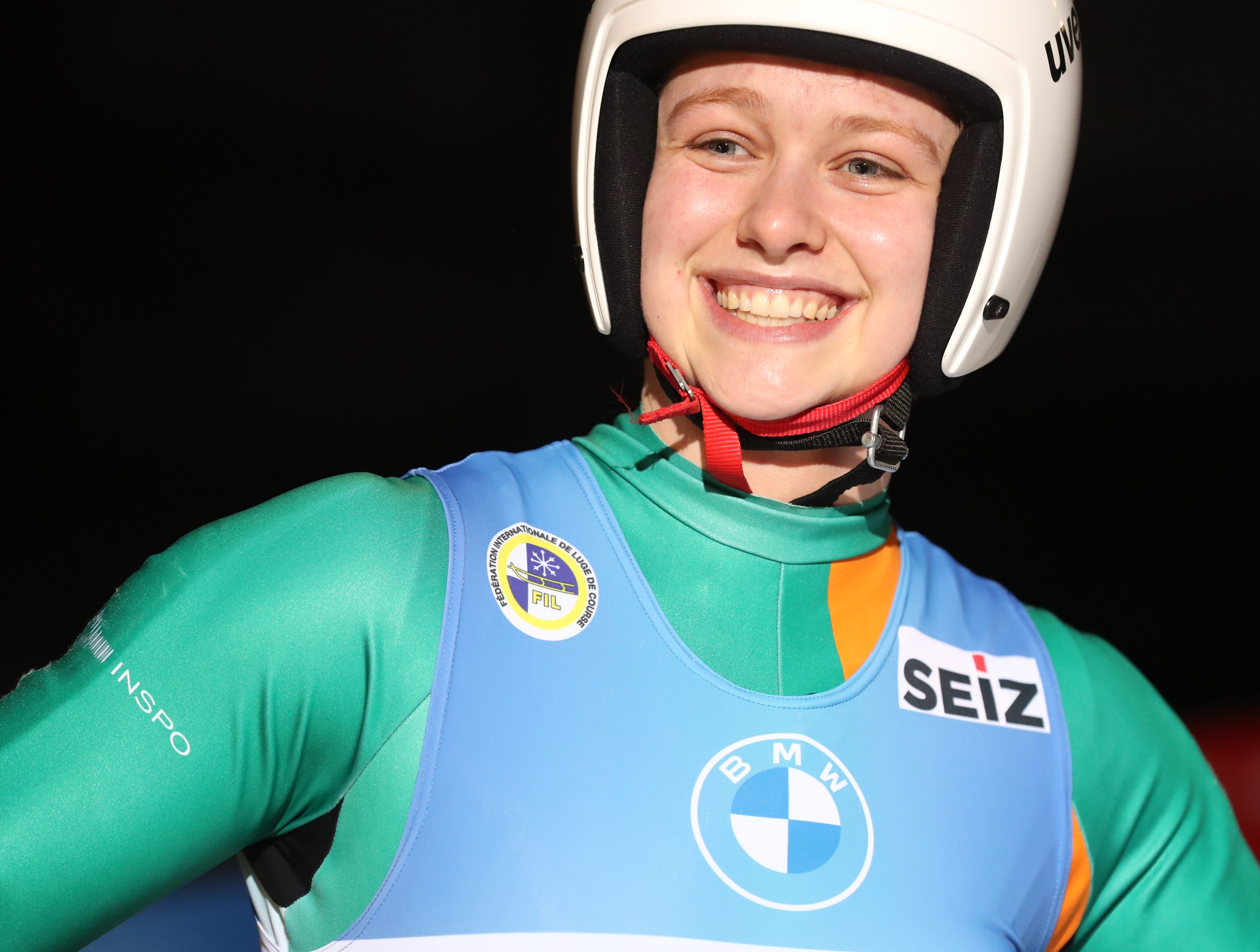
Desmond at the 2021–22 Luge World Cup.

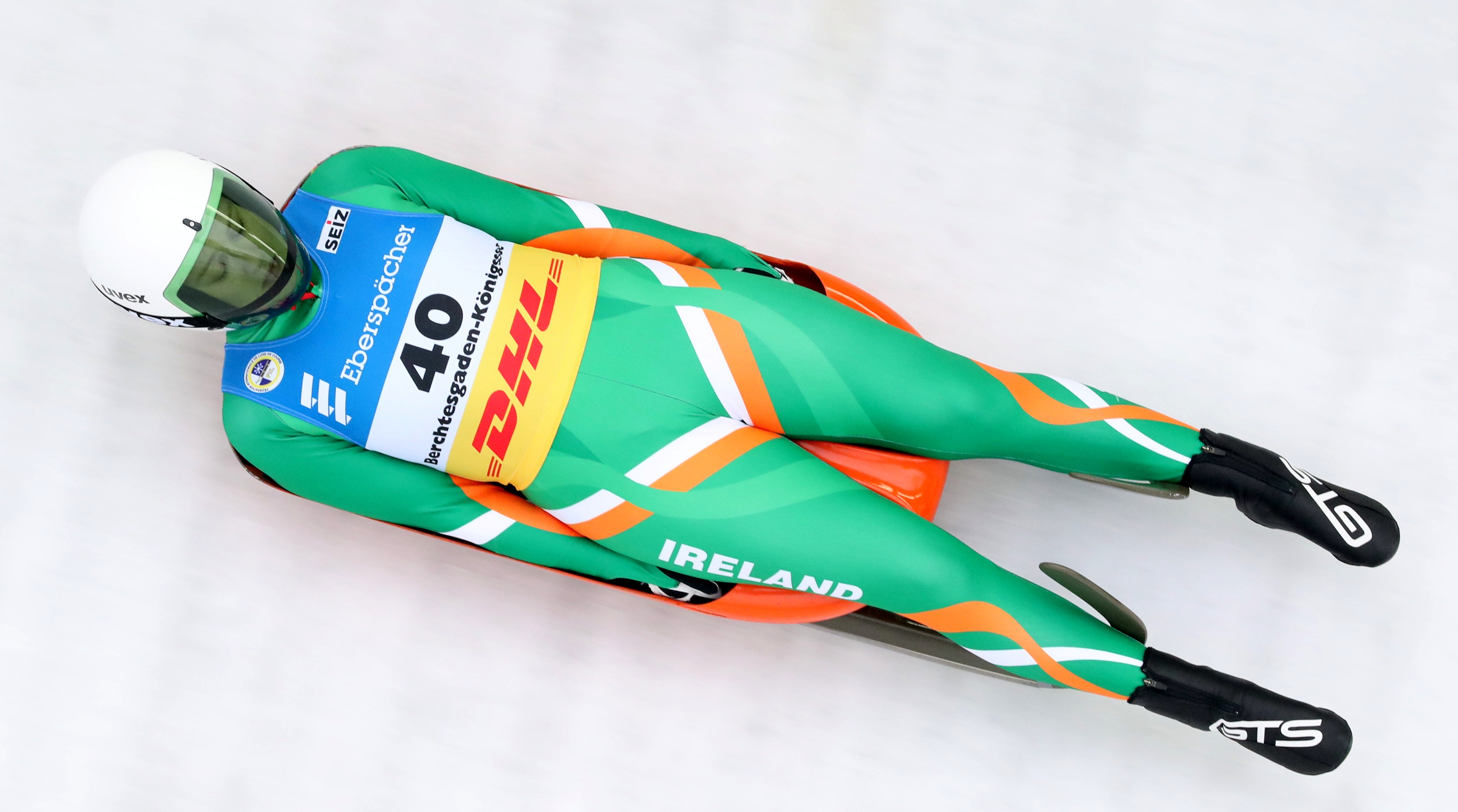
Desmond at the 2021 FIL World Luge Championships

Desmond began to compete internationally in luge in 2018. Elsa founded the Irish Luge Federation with support from her family to allow her to compete internationally, and continues to be a fully self funded athlete. She competed for Ireland at the 2022 Winter Olympics in the women's singles event becoming Irelands first luge athlete to compete at the Olympics. She continues to run the Irish Luge Federation alongside coaching the growing junior team with the aim of ensuring the longevity of the sport within Ireland.

At the 2024 Winter Youth Olympics in Gangwon, South Korea Desmond was the team leader for the Irish luge team, coaching youth athlete Lily Cooke.

Elsa's qualification for 2026 Winter Olympics was surrounded with controversy. Desmond met all criteria to qualify, but at the last minute her Olympic spot was allocated to one of the Individual Neutral Athletes at the 2026 Winter Olympics with no transparency or reasoning given by the International Luge Federation for this decision. The Irish Luge Federation took the case to the Court of Arbitration for Sport, who ruled no jurisdiction as the Olympic selection process concluded more than 10 days prior to the opening ceremony of the games. Although Desmond never got the opportunity to compete at her second games, it is widely acknowledged in the press that she was unlawfully deprived her spot to compete in the 2026 Winter Olympics.

=== Women's World Cup Season Results ===
Season	Ranking	Points
2018/19	43	28
2019/20	61	-
2020/21	50	8
2021/22	54	13
2022/23	31	71
2023/24	26	102
2024/25	28	118

=== Championship Results ===
Year	Event	Ranking
2019	U23 World Championship Winterberg.	10
2019	World Championship Winterberg.	30
2019	European Championships Oberhof	24
2021	World Championship Konigssee.	40
2023	World Championship Oberhof.	35
2023	European Championships Sigulda.	20
2024	World Championship Oberhof.	34
2024	European Championships Innsbruck.	27
2025	World Championship Whistler Sliding Centre.	30
2026	European Championships Oberhof	19

=== Olympic Results ===
Year	Host City	Ranking
2022	Beijing.	33

FIL Official Results

== Personal life ==
Desmond studied medicine at King's College London, and began to work at Southend University Hospital in July 2021. Desmond then relocated to Iceland, where she aims to pursue a career in emergency medicine or anaesthetics with the aim of eventually working in the Air medical services.

== See also ==
- Ireland at the 2022 Winter Olympics
