= Elīna Ieva Bota =

Latvian luger (born 2000)

Elīna Bota
- Bota in 2026

Personal information
- Full name: Elīna Ieva Bota
- Nationality: Latvian
- Born: 14 April 2000 (age 26) Sigulda, Latvia
- Height: 177 cm (5 ft 10 in)

Sport
- Country: Latvia
- Sport: Luge
Medal record
Women's luge
Representing Latvia
Olympic Games
Silver medal – second place	2026 Milano Cortina	Singles
World Championships
Bronze medal – third place	2024 Altenberg	Sprint
Bronze medal – third place	2024 Altenberg	Team relay
European Championships
Gold medal – first place	2022 St. Moritz	Team relay
Gold medal – first place	2023 Sigulda	Team relay
Bronze medal – third place	2022 St. Moritz	Singles
Bronze medal – third place	2023 Sigulda	Singles
Bronze medal – third place	2026 Oberhof	Team relay

Elīna Ieva Bota (née Vītola; born 14 May 2000) is a Latvian luger who represented Latvia at the 2022 and 2026 Winter Olympics.

== Career ==
Bota represented Latvia at the 2022 Beijing Winter Olympics in the singles event, where she finished in 18th place.

At the 2024 FIL World Luge Championships, she won bronze medals in the sprint event and the team relay.

On February 10, 2026, at the 2026 Milano Cortina Winter Olympics, Bota won the silver medal in the luge women's singles, which made her the first Latvian woman to win any Winter Olympic medal in individual competitions.

== Personal life ==
On 5 July 2024, Bota married luger Mārtiņš Bots, who has also represented Latvia at the 2022 Winter Olympics.
