= Ashley Farquharson =

American luger (born 1999)

- Farquharson in 2026

Personal information
- Born: March 16, 1999 (age 27) Sacramento, California, U.S.

Sport
- Country: United States of America
- Sport: Luge
- Event: Singles
Medal record
Women's luge
Representing the United States
Olympic Games
Bronze medal – third place	2026 Milano Cortina	Singles

Ashley Farquharson (born March 16, 1999) is an American luger who represented the United States at the 2022 and 2026 Winter Olympics. She won a bronze medal in women's singles at the 2026 Winter Olympics.

== Career ==
Farquharson won a silver medal at the 2021 America-Pacific Luge Championship in the singles luge and a silver medal in the team relay at the 2021–22 Luge World Cup.

She represented the United States at the 2022 Winter Olympics in the women's singles luge event and finished in 12th place.

She also represented the United States at the 2026 Winter Olympics in the women's singles luge event, where she won a bronze medal, becoming the second American woman and the first in 12 years to win an Olympic medal in luge.

== Olympic Results ==
Year	Women's Singles	Team Relay
(China) 2022 Beijing	12	-
(Italy) 2026 Milan-Cortina	3	5
