= Natalie Maag =

Swiss luger (born 1997)

- Maag in 2026

Personal information
- Nationality: Swiss
- Born: 27 November 1997 (age 28) Wetzikon, Switzerland

Sport
- Sport: Luge
Medal record
Women's luge
Representing Switzerland
World Championships
Silver medal – second place	2024 Alternberg	Sprint
European Championships
Bronze medal – third place	2026 Oberhof	Singles

Natalie Maag (born 29 November 1997) is a Swiss luger who represented Switzerland at the 2022 Winter Olympics.

== Career ==
Maag represented Swtizterland at the 2022 Winter Olympics in the singles event where she finished in ninth place.

She competed at the 2024 FIL World Luge Championships and won a silver medal in the sprint event with a time of 37.774. She again competed at the 2025 FIL World Luge Championships and finished in fifth place in the singles event with a total time of 1:17.349 and finished in sixth place in the mixed singles event, along with Alexander Ferlazzo.
