= Sandra Robatscher =

Italian luger (born 1995)

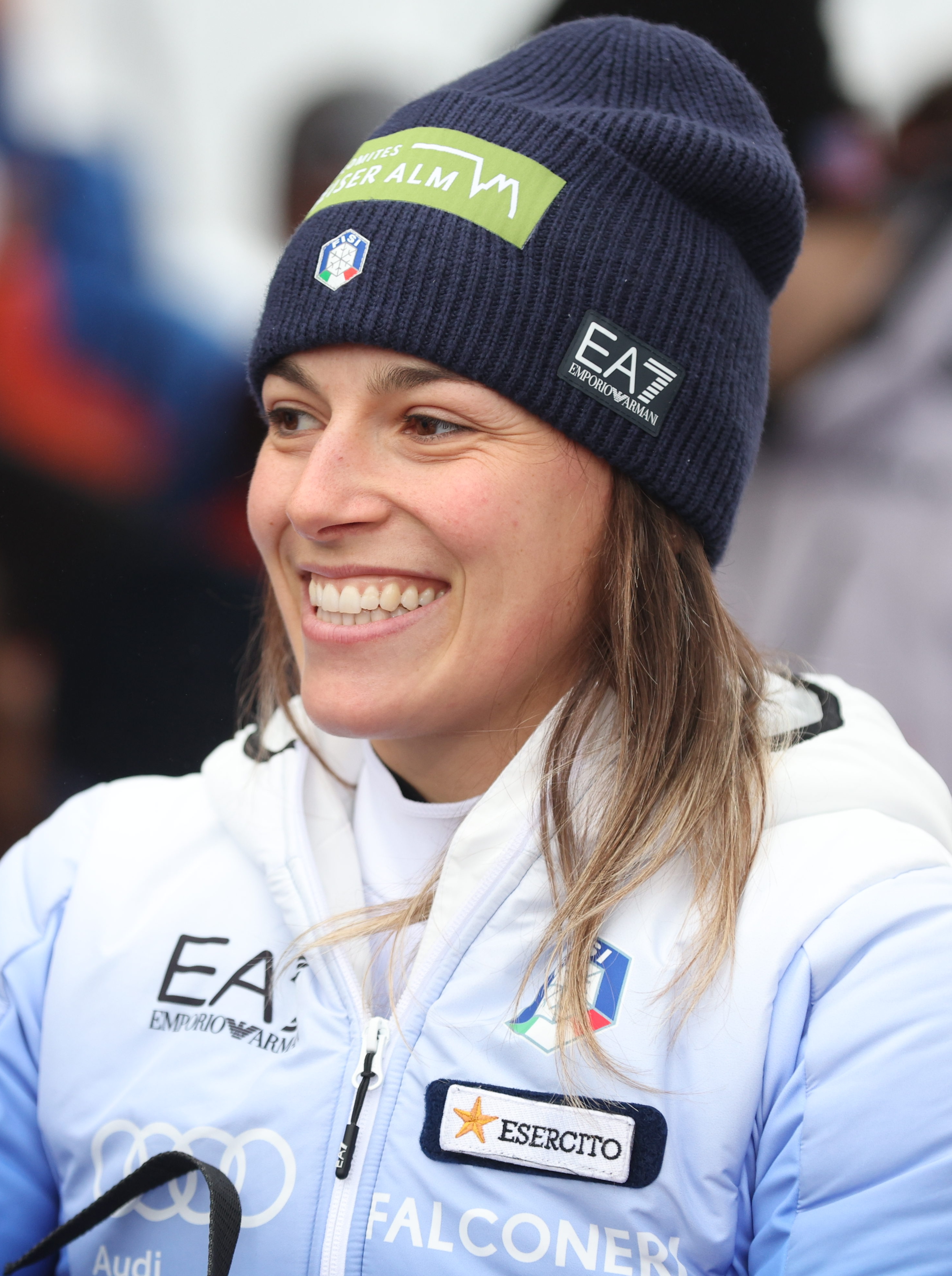
- Robatscher in 2024

Personal information
- Nationality: Italian
- Born: 13 December 1995 (age 30) Bolzano, Italy
- Height: 1.71 m (5 ft 7 in)
- Weight: 64 kg (141 lb)

Sport
- Country: Italy
- Sport: Luge
- Event: Women's singles
Medal record
European Championships
Bronze medal – third place	2018 Sigulda	Singles
Bronze medal – third place	2023 Sigulda	Team relay

Sandra Robatscher (born 13 December 1995) is an Italian luger. She is the niece of fellow luger Armin Zöggeler.

Robatscher competed at the 2014 Winter Olympics for Italy. In the Women's singles she placed 22nd.

As of September 2017, Robatscher's best Luge World Cup overall finish is 16th in 2015–16. In February 2019 she took her first World Cup win at Altenberg in a race shortened to one run as the second run was cancelled because of heavy snow.
