= Verena Hofer =

Italian luger (born 2001)

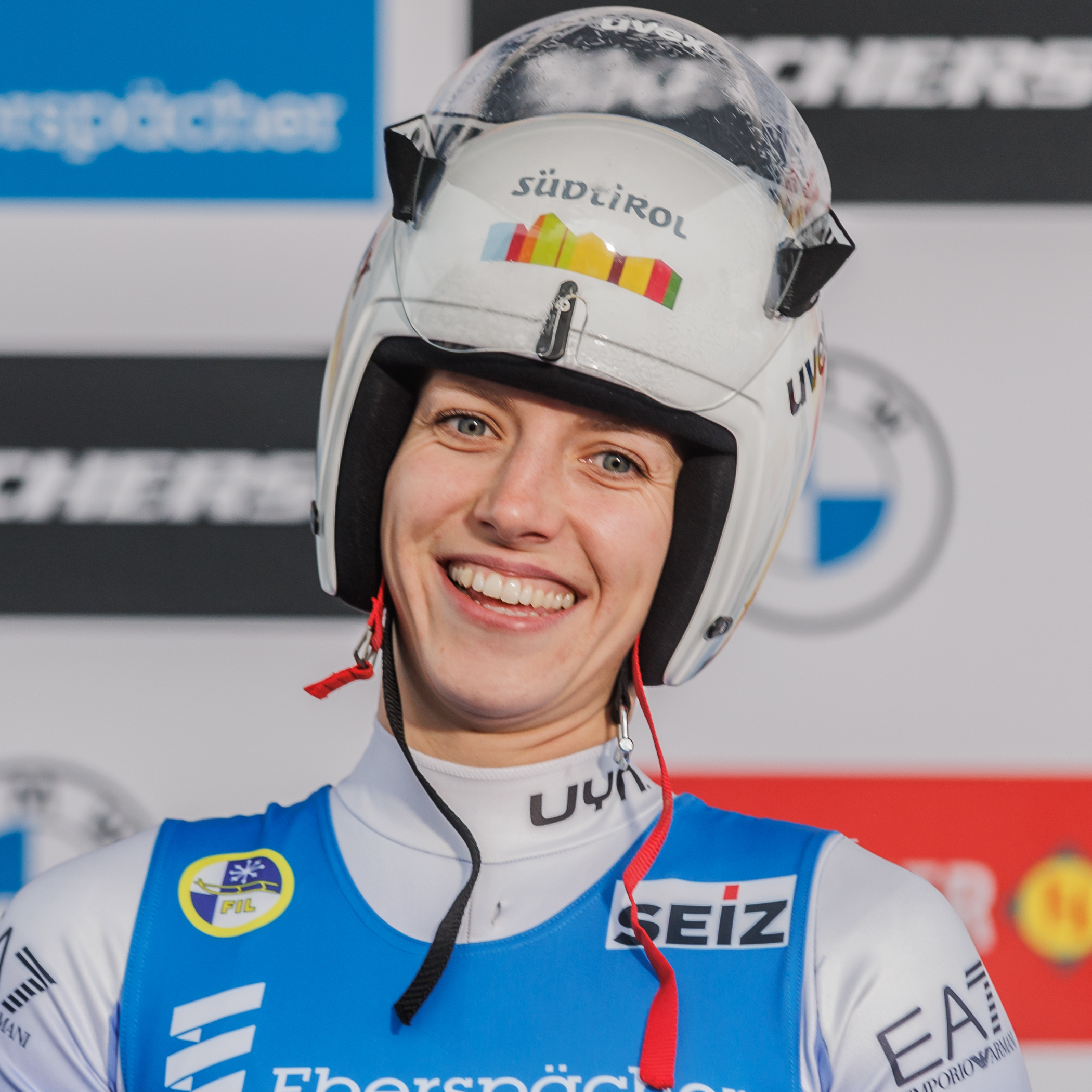
- Hofer in 2024

Personal information
- Nationality: Italian
- Born: 17 March 2001 (age 25) Brixen, Italy

Sport
- Sport: Luge
Medal record
Women's luge
Representing Italy
Olympic Games
Bronze medal – third place	2026 Milano Cortina	Team relay
European Championships
Bronze medal – third place	2024 Igls	Team relay
Bronze medal – third place	2025 Winterberg	Team relay

Verena Hofer (born 17 March 2001) is an Italian luger who represented Italy at the 2022 and 2026 Winter Olympics.

== Career ==
Hofer competed at the 2018 Junior World Luge Championships and won a bronze medal in the team relay with a time of 2:16.972. She again competed at the 2019 Junior World Luge Championships and won a silver medal in the singles event with a time of 1:21.388.

She represented Switzerland at the 2022 Winter Olympics in the singles event where she finished in 13th place.

She competed at the 2024 FIL European Luge Championships and won a bronze medal in the team relay with a time of 2:52.651. She again competed at the 2025 FIL European Luge Championships and won a bronze medal in the team relay with a time of 3:12.008.

During the 2025–26 Luge World Cup, Italy won the team relay on 13 December 2025 with a time of 3:05.885. She represented Italy at the 2026 Winter Olympics and won a bronze medal in the team relay.
