= Luge at the 2020 Winter Youth Olympics – Girls' doubles =

Girls' doubles at the III Winter Youth Olympic Games
- Venue: St. Moritz-Celerina Olympic Bobrun
- Dates: 18 January
- Competitors: 22 from 11 nations
- Winning time: 1:51.443

Medalists
1st place, gold medalist(s)		Jessica Degenhardt; Vanessa Schneider	Germany
2nd place, silver medalist(s)		Caitlin Nash; Natalie Corless	Canada
3rd place, bronze medalist(s)		Viktorija Ziediņa; Selīna Elizabete Zvilna	Latvia

The girls' doubles luge at the 2020 Winter Youth Olympics took place on 18 January at the St. Moritz-Celerina Olympic Bobrun.

== Results ==
The first run was held at 11:00 and the second run at 12:00.

Rank	Bib	Athlete	Country	Run 1	Rank 1	Run 2	Rank 2	Total	Behind
1st place, gold medalist(s)	3	Jessica Degenhardt; Vanessa Schneider	Germany	55.748	1	55.695	1	1:51.443	
2nd place, silver medalist(s)	7	Caitlin Nash; Natalie Corless	Canada	56.294	4	56.415	2	1:52.709	+1.266
3rd place, bronze medalist(s)	6	Viktorija Ziediņa; Selīna Elizabete Zvilna	Latvia	56.488	5	56.555	3	1:53.043	+1.600
4	5	Maya Chan; Reannyn Weiler	United States	56.145	3	57.095	6	1:53.240	+1.797
5	11	Nikola Domowicz; Dominika Piwkowska	Poland	56.705	6	56.781	4	1:53.486	+2.043
6	1	Natalia Korotaeva; Viktoriia Chirkova	Russia	56.087	2	58.292	10	1:54.379	+2.936
7	2	Bianka Petríková; Nikola Trembošová	Slovakia	57.742	10	57.026	5	1:54.768	+3.325
8	10	Petra Tolomey; Daria Căciulan	Romania	57.488	9	57.303	7	1:54.791	+3.348
9	4	Markéta Nováková; Anna Vejdělková	Czech Republic	56.790	8	58.068	9	1:54.858	+3.415
10	8	Nadiia Antoniuk; Oleksandra Mokh	Ukraine	56.773	7	58.530	11	1:55.303	+3.860
11	9	Adriana Adam; Aliona Busuioc	Moldova	58.079	11	57.709	8	1:55.788	+4.345
