= Luge at the 2026 Winter Olympics – Women's doubles =

Luge women's doubles at the XXV Olympic Winter Games
- Luge pictogram
- Venue: Cortina Sliding Centre
- Date: 11 February 2026
- Winning time: 1:46.284

Medalists
1st place, gold medalist(s)		Andrea Vötter; Marion Oberhofer	Italy
2nd place, silver medalist(s)		Dajana Eitberger; Magdalena Matschina	Germany
3rd place, bronze medalist(s)		Selina Egle; Lara Kipp	Austria

The women's doubles competition in luge at the 2026 Winter Olympics was held on 11 February at the Cortina Sliding Centre in Cortina d'Ampezzo. This was the inaugural edition of the event. Andrea Vötter and Marion Oberhofer of Italy became the champions, Dajana Eitberger and Magdalena Matschina of Germany won the silver medal, and Selina Egle and Lara Kipp of Austria won bronze.

== Background ==
Selina Egle and Lara Kipp were leading the singles standing of the 2025–26 Luge World Cup before the Olympics. They were also the 2025 World Champions.

== Qualification ==
=== Summary ===
Number of sleds	Athletes total	Nations
11	22	11

== Results ==
Rank	Bib	Athlete	Country	Run 1	Rank	Run 2	Rank	Total	Behind
1st place, gold medalist(s)	2	Andrea Vötter; Marion Oberhofer	Italy	53.102	1	53.182	1	1:46.284	—
2nd place, silver medalist(s)	6	Dajana Eitberger; Magdalena Matschina	Germany	53.124	2	53.280	2	1:46.404	+0.120
3rd place, bronze medalist(s)	3	Selina Egle; Lara Kipp	Austria	53.193	3	53.350	4	1:46.543	+0.259
4	4	Marta Robežniece; Kitija Bogdanova	Latvia	53.492	4	53.304	3	1:46.796	+0.512
5	1	Chevonne Forgan; Sophia Kirkby	United States	53.570	5	53.995	7	1:47.565	+1.281
6	7	Nikola Domowicz; Dominika Piwkowska	Poland	54.247	8	53.989	6	1:48.236	+1.952
7	5	Olena Stetskiv; Oleksandra Mokh	Ukraine	54.174	6	54.231	8	1:48.405	+2.121
8	8	Gulijienaiti Adikeyoumu; Zhao Jiaying	China	54.180	7	54.307	9	1:48.487	+2.203
9	10	Raluca Strămăturaru; Mihaela-Carmen Manolescu	Romania	54.339	9	54.405	10	1:48.744	+2.460
10	11	Beattie Podulsky; Kailey Allan	Canada	55.735	10	53.747	5	1:49.482	+3.198
11	9	Viktória Praxová; Desana Špitzová	Slovakia	56.227	11	55.286	11	1:51.513	+5.229
