= 2025 FIL World Luge Championships – Women's doubles =

Women's doubles at the 2025 FIL World Luge Championships
- Venue: Whistler Sliding Centre
- Location: Whistler, British Columbia, Canada
- Dates: 7 February
- Competitors: 24 from 9 nations
- Teams: 12
- Winning time: 1:17.724

Medalists
gold medal	Selina Egle; Lara Kipp	Austria
silver medal	Jessica Degenhardt; Cheyenne Rosenthal	Germany
bronze medal	Dajana Eitberger; Magdalena Matschina	Germany

The Women's doubles competition at the 2025 FIL World Luge Championships was held on 7 February 2025.

== Results ==
The race was started at 14:42.

Rank	Bib	Name	Country	Run 1	Rank	Run 2	Rank	Total	Diff
1st place, gold medalist(s)	7	Selina Egle; Lara Kipp	Austria	38.858	1	38.866	3	1:17.724	
2nd place, silver medalist(s)	9	Jessica Degenhardt; Cheyenne Rosenthal	Germany	38.947	3	38.806	1	1:17.753	+0.029
3rd place, bronze medalist(s)	4	Dajana Eitberger; Magdalena Matschina	Germany	38.927	2	38.857	2	1:17.784	+0.060
4	8	Andrea Vötter; Marion Oberhofer	Italy	38.967	4	38.930	4	1:17.897	+0.173
5	11	Chevonne Forgan; Sophia Kirkby	United States	39.023	6	38.945	5	1:17.968	+0.244
6	12	Marta Robežniece; Kitija Bogdanova	Latvia	38.993	5	39.088	7	1:18.081	+0.357
7	10	Anda Upīte; Zane Kaluma	Latvia	39.104	7	39.029	6	1:18.133	+0.409
8	3	Beattie Podulsky; Kailey Allan	Canada	39.143	8	39.265	8	1:18.408	+0.684
9	6	Raluca Strămăturaru; Carmen Manolescu	Romania	39.577	9	39.574	10	1:19.151	+1.427
10	1	Nikola Domowicz; Dominika Piwkowska	Poland	39.811	11	39.506	9	1:19.317	+1.593
11	2	Olena Stetskiv; Oleksandra Mokh	Ukraine	39.801	10	39.980	11	1:19.781	+2.057
	5	Maya Chan; Sophia Gordon	United States	Did not finish					
