= 2022 FIL World Luge Championships =

International luge competition

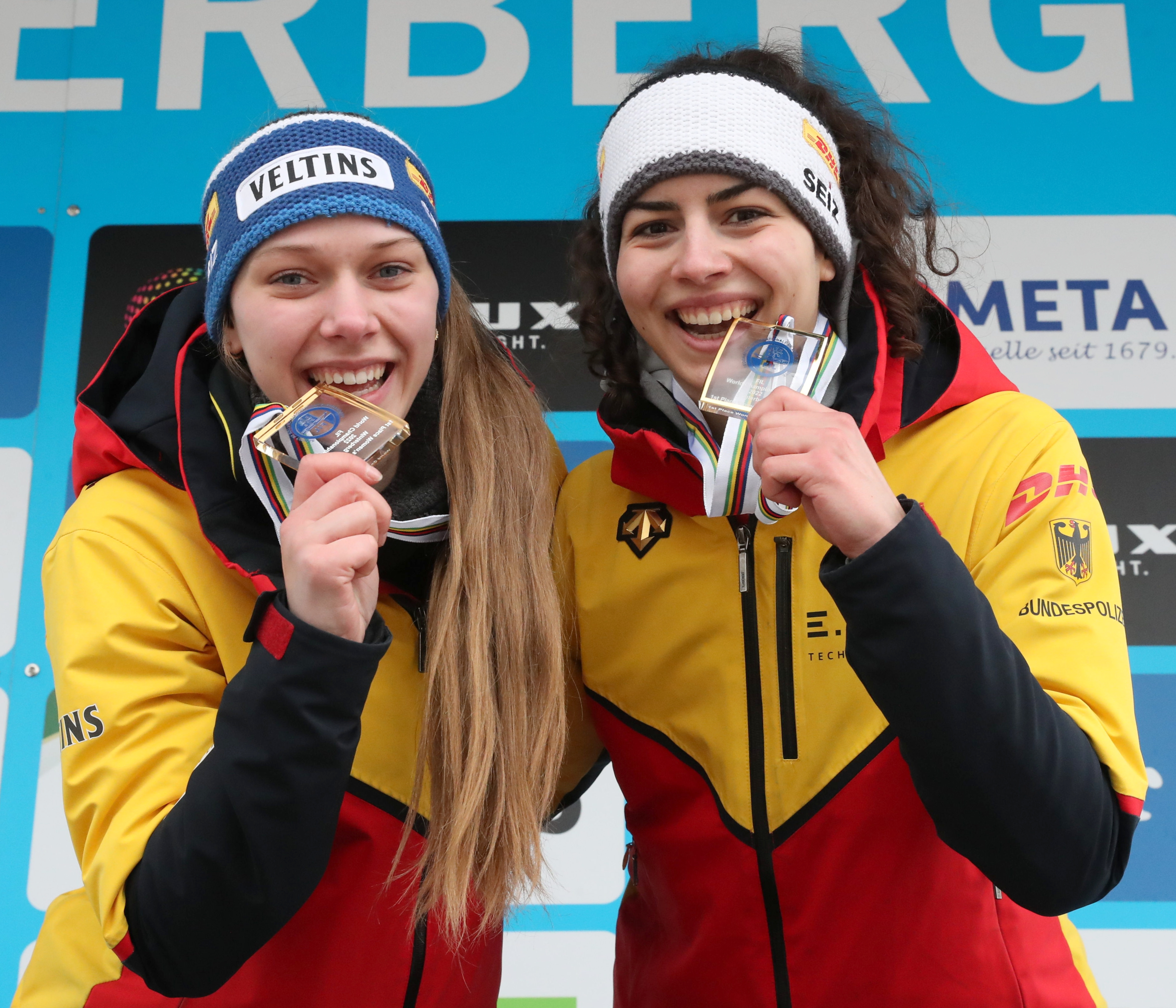
- Cheyenne Rosenthal and Jessica Degenhardt
- Venue: Winterberg, Germany
- Dates: 30 January
- Competitors: 28 from 9 nations

The 2022 FIL World Luge Championships were held on 30 January 2022 in Winterberg, Germany. There was only one, non-Olympic discipline of women's doubles.

== Results ==
Rank	Bib	Name	Country	Run 1	Rank	Run 2	Rank	Total	Diff
1st place, gold medalist(s)	2	Jessica Degenhardt; Cheyenne Rosenthal	Germany	48.293	1	47.801	1	1:36.094	
2nd place, silver medalist(s)	5	Luisa Romanenko; Pauline Patz	Germany	48.577	2	48.075	2	1:36.652	+0.558
3rd place, bronze medalist(s)	1	Chevonne Forgan; Sophia Kirkby	United States	48.901	4	48.377	3	1:37.278	+1.184
4	4	Maya Chan; Reannyn Weiler	United States	48.849	3	48.528	4	1:37.377	+1.283
5	3	Viktorija Ziediņa; Selīna Elizabete Zvilna	Latvia	48.910	5	48.910	8	1:37.820	+1.726
6	13	Caitlin Nash; Kailey Allan	Canada	49.004	6	48.878	7	1:37.882	+1.788
7	6	Anda Upīte; Sanija Ozoliņa	Latvia	49.151	8	48.770	5	1:37.921	+1.827
8	10	Marta Robežniece; Kitija Bogdanova	Latvia	49.030	7	49.026	9	1:38.056	+1.962
9	8	Anastasiia Kropacheva; Alena Starkova	Russian Luge Federation	49.554	10	48.797	6	1:38.351	+2.257
10	14	Elisa-Marie Storch; Elia Reitmeier	Germany	49.497	9	49.207	10	1:38.704	+2.610
11	12	Nikola Domowicz; Dominika Piwkowska	Poland	50.113	12	49.505	11	1:39.618	+3.524
12	11	Natasha Khytrenko; Viktoriia Koval	Ukraine	50.218	13	49.725	12	1:39.943	+3.849
13	9	Bianka Petríková; Nikola Trembošová	Slovakia	50.962	14	49.763	13	1:40.725	+4.631
	7	Markéta Nováková; Anna Vejdělková	Czech Republic	50.052	11	Did not finish			
