= 2023 FIL World Luge Championships – Women's doubles' sprint =

Women's doubles sprint at the 2023 FIL World Luge Championships
- Venue: Oberhof bobsleigh, luge, and skeleton track
- Location: Oberhof, Germany
- Date: 27 January
- Competitors: 30 from 7 nations
- Teams: 15
- Winning time: 31.205

Medalists
gold medal	Jessica Degenhardt; Cheyenne Rosenthal	Germany
silver medal	Selina Egle; Lara Kipp	Austria
bronze medal	Andrea Vötter; Marion Oberhofer	Italy

The women's doubles sprint competition at the 2023 FIL World Luge Championships was held on 27 January 2023.

== Results ==
The qualification was held at 09:00 and the final at 13:34.

Rank	Bib	Name	Country	Qualification		Final	
Rank	Bib	Name	Country	Time	Rank	Time	Diff
1st place, gold medalist(s)	7	Jessica Degenhardt; Cheyenne Rosenthal	Germany	31.004	1	31.205	
2nd place, silver medalist(s)	8	Selina Egle; Lara Kipp	Austria	31.633	9	31.221	+0.016
3rd place, bronze medalist(s)	9	Andrea Vötter; Marion Oberhofer	Italy	31.087	2	31.228	+0.023
4	1	Nadia Falkensteiner; Annalena Huber	Italy	31.414	5	31.478	+0.273
5	5	Anda Upīte; Sanija Ozoliņa	Latvia	31.385	4	31.502	+0.297
6	6	Chevonne Forgan; Sophia Kirkby	United States	31.491	7	31.522	+0.317
7	15	Marta Robežniece; Kitija Bogdanova	Latvia	31.344	3	31.606	+0.401
8	13	Viktorija Ziediņa; Selīna Zvilna	Latvia	31.509	8	31.615	+0.410
9	3	Maya Chan; Reannyn Weiler	United States	31.481	6	31.631	+0.426
10	14	Annika Krause; Magdalena Matschina	Germany	31.671	11	31.704	+0.499
11	12	Elisa-Marie Storch; Elia Reitmeier	Germany	31.661	10	31.719	+0.514
12	11	Lisa Zimmermann; Dorothea Schwarz	Austria	31.689	12	31.768	+0.563
13	2	Olena Stetskiv; Oleksandra Mokh	Ukraine	31.694	13	31.802	+0.597
14	10	Natasha Khytrenko; Viktoriia Koval	Ukraine	31.865	14	31.968	+0.763
15	4	Raluca Strămăturaru; Carmen Manolescu	Romania	32.002	15	32.168	+0.963
