= Saskia Schirmer =

German luger (born 2003)

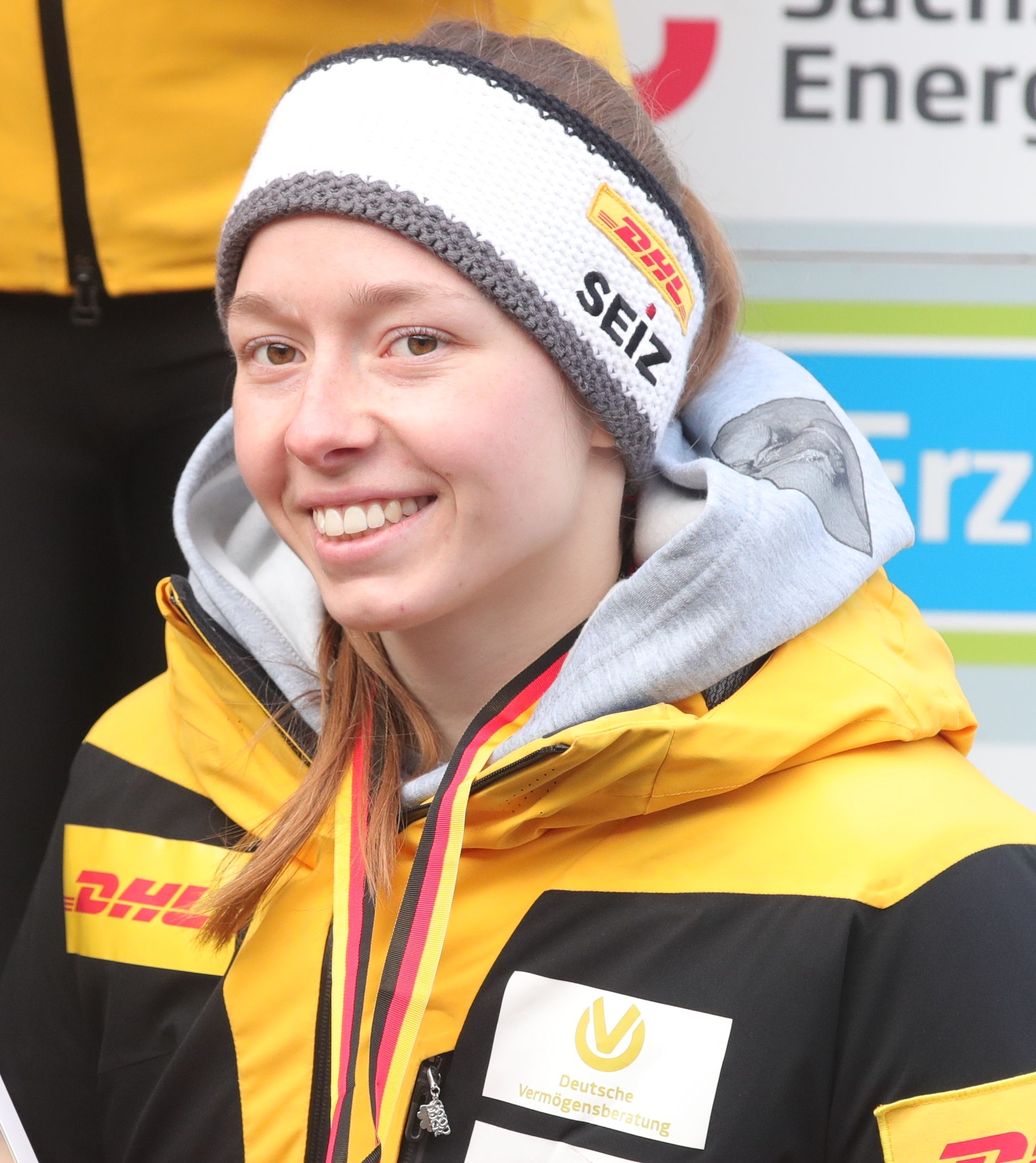
- Schirmer in 2023

Personal information
- Nationality: German
- Born: 18 December 2003 (age 22)

Sport
- Sport: Luge
Medal record
Women's luge
Representing Germany
World Championships
Gold medal – first place	2024 Altenberg	Team relay

Saskia Schirmer (born 18 December 2003) is a German luger.

== Career ==
Schirmer competed in doubles with Dajana Eitberger during the 2023–24 Luge World Cup. She represented Germany at the 2024 FIL World Luge Championships and won a gold medal in the team relay with a time of 3:10.869. She also finished in fifth place in the doubles' sprint and sixth place in the doubles events. In July 2024, Eitberger ended her partnership with Schirmer, and formed a new duo with Magdalena Matschina.
