= 2023 FIL World Luge Championships – Women's doubles =

Women's doubles at the 2023 FIL World Luge Championships
- Venue: Oberhof bobsleigh, luge, and skeleton track
- Location: Oberhof, Germany
- Date: 28 January
- Competitors: 30 from 7 nations
- Teams: 15
- Winning time: 1:17.619

Medalists
gold medal	Jessica Degenhardt; Cheyenne Rosenthal	Germany
silver medal	Selina Egle; Lara Kipp	Austria
bronze medal	Andrea Vötter; Marion Oberhofer	Italy

The women's doubles competition at the 2023 FIL World Luge Championships was held on 28 January 2023.

== Results ==
The first run was held at 09:10 and the second run at 10:46.

Rank	Bib	Name	Country	Run 1	Rank	Run 2	Rank	Total	Diff
1st place, gold medalist(s)	11	Jessica Degenhardt; Cheyenne Rosenthal	Germany	38.823	1	38.796	1	1:17.619	
2nd place, silver medalist(s)	8	Selina Egle; Lara Kipp	Austria	39.838	2	38.907	2	1:17.745	+0.126
3rd place, bronze medalist(s)	10	Andrea Vötter; Marion Oberhofer	Italy	38.889	3	38.917	3	1:17.806	+0.187
4	9	Anda Upīte; Sanija Ozoliņa	Latvia	39.061	4	39.112	4	1:18.173	+0.554
5	3	Nadia Falkensteiner; Annalena Huber	Italy	39.211	5	39.220	5	1:18.431	+0.812
6	7	Chevonne Forgan; Sophia Kirkby	United States	39.252	6	39.220	5	1:18.472	+0.853
7	2	Lisa Zimmermann; Dorothea Schwarz	Austria	39.260	7	39.264	7	1:18.524	+0.905
8	1	Marta Robežniece; Kitija Bogdanova	Latvia	39.336	9	39.270	8	1:18.606	+0.987
9	5	Maya Chan; Reannyn Weiler	United States	39.444	10	39.352	9	1:18.796	+1.177
10	13	Viktorija Ziediņa; Selīna Zvilna	Latvia	39.272	8	39.554	11	1:18.826	+1.207
11	4	Olena Stetskiv; Oleksandra Mokh	Ukraine	39.494	11	39.606	12	1:19.100	+1.481
12	12	Annika Krause; Magdalena Matschina	Germany	39.663	12	39.496	10	1:19.132	+1.513
13	14	Elisa-Marie Storch; Elia Reitmeier	Germany	39.689	13	39.619	13	1:19.308	+1.689
14	6	Raluca Strămăturaru; Carmen Manolescu	Romania	39.820	14	39.842	14	1:19.662	+2.043
15	15	Natasha Khytrenko; Viktoriia Koval	Ukraine	39.931	15	39.846	15	1:19.777	+2.158
