= Jessica Degenhardt =

German luger (born 2002)

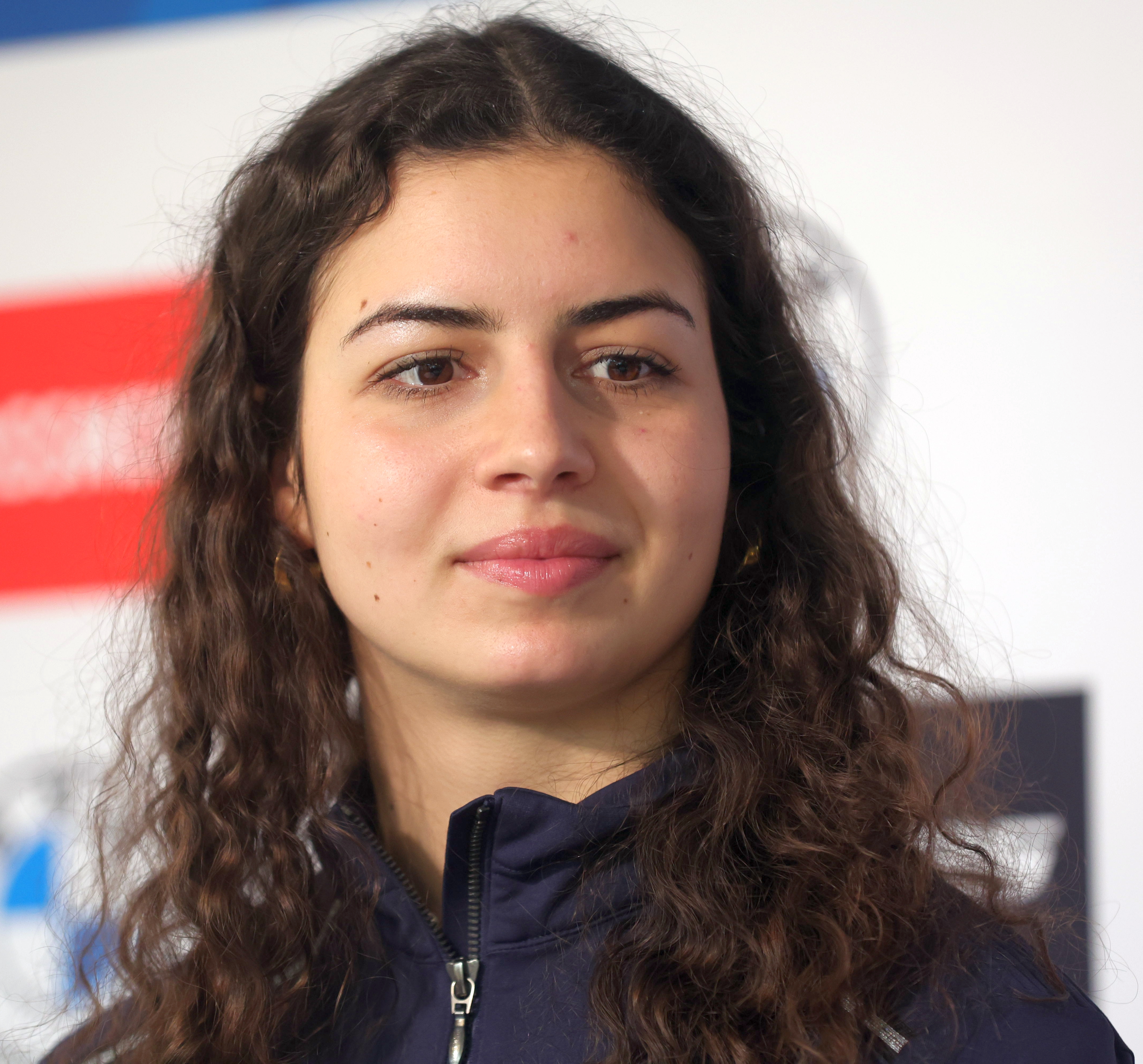
- Degenhardt in 2024

Personal information
- Born: 21 April 2002 (age 24) Dresden, Germany
- Height: 178 cm (5 ft 10 in)
- Weight: 68 kg (150 lb)

Sport
- Country: Germany
- Sport: Luge
- Events: Singles, Doubles
- Club: RRC Altenberg
- Coached by: Steffen Sartor
Medal record
Women's luge
Representing Germany
World Championships
Gold medal – first place	2022 Winterberg	Doubles
Gold medal – first place	2023 Oberhof	Doubles
Gold medal – first place	2023 Oberhof	Doubles' sprint
Gold medal – first place	2025 Whistler	Team relay
Silver medal – second place	2025 Whistler	Doubles
Bronze medal – third place	2025 Whistler	Mixed doubles
European Championships
Gold medal – first place	2024 Igls	Doubles
Gold medal – first place	2026 Oberhof	Doubles
Silver medal – second place	2024 Igls	Team relay
Silver medal – second place	2025 Winterberg	Doubles
Silver medal – second place	2025 Winterberg	Team relay
Silver medal – second place	2026 Oberhof	Mixed doubles
Bronze medal – third place	2023 Sigulda	Doubles
Winter Youth Olympic Games
Gold medal – first place	2020 St.Moritz	Doubles
Silver medal – second place	2020 St.Moritz	Singles
Junior World Championships
Gold medal – first place	2020 Oberhof	Singles
Gold medal – first place	2020 Oberhof	Team
Gold medal – first place	2022 Winterberg	Singles
Gold medal – first place	2022 Winterberg	Team
Bronze medal – third place	2018 Altenberg	Singles
Bronze medal – third place	2019 Innsbruck	Singles

Jessica Doreen Degenhardt (born 21 April 2002) is a German luger. She is four-time Junior World Champion and won gold medal at the 2020 Winter Youth Olympics at doubles' race and silver medal at the individual race. She also retains the World Championships gold medal at 2022, 2023 in women's doubles discipline and Women's doubles' sprint discipline in 2023.

== Career ==
Degenhardt started her luge career at PSV Elbe Dresden in 2010 when she was eight years old. Currently, she is a member of the RRC Altenberg club and German national team.

=== Youth and Junior career ===
Degenhardt kicked off her first season in the youth field (Youth B) in 2015/16. After successful season at Youth B division, she moved up to youth A division in the 2016/17 season. In this season, she finished the German championship in Winterberg as runner-up. She also secured the multiple victories in the Youth A World Cup including the Oberhof, Altenberg and Winterberg races and won the overall ranking of the World Cup.

In the 2017/18 season, she also competed in the Youth A division. At the German A-Youth Championships on her home track in Altenberg, she won the title and moved up to Junior division. At the 2018 Junior World Championships on her home track, she achieved bronze behind Jessica Tiebel and the Russian Tatjana Zwetowa.

In 2018/19 season, Degenhardt started to compete in the Junior World Cup. In Oberhof, she won her first race in the Junior World Cup and also won the relay race with the German team. She finished second in Winterberg and third in Calgary. In the overall standings, she was only beaten by the Russian Zwetowa by 15 points with 402 points. She also competed with Vanessa Schneider in the girls' doubles race, which was held for the first time this season. In their first race together in St. Moritz, they took silver behind their teammates Anka Jänicke and Saskia Schirmer. The end of the season, Degenhardt/Schneider won the two remaining races of the season in Winterberg and Oberhof and ended up second in the overall standings behind Caitlin Nash and Natalie Corless. At the Junior World Championships 2019 in Igls, Degenhardt concluded the competition with third place behind Cheyenne Rosenthal and Verena Hofer.

In the 2019/20 season, she started with two wins in Igls, with Schneider in doubles and in singles. She also secured second place in the second individual race in Igls behind Kailey Allan from Canada. Degenhardt/Schneider won the overall World Cup for juniors with five victories in six races and 500 points. At the 2020 Winter Youth Olympics, she was the German flag bearer in the opening ceremony. In Winter Youth Olympics individual race, she defeated to her teammate Merle Fräbel. However, one day later she won the first ever Olympic gold medal in the women's doubles with Schneider. In mid-February, Degenhardt won the gold medal at the 2020 Junior World Luge Championships in Oberhof in the individual ahead of the Russian Diana Loginowa and the Austrian Lisa Schulte, as well as together with Moritz Bollmann and the doubles Max Ewald and Jakob Jannusch in the team relay race. The 2020/21 junior season was canceled due to the COVID-19 pandemic, so Degenhardt was unable to start a race.

=== Senior career ===
After Jessica Tiebel withdrew from the ongoing competitions of the 2019/20 season, Degenhardt moved up to the World Cup team for the last race of the season at Königssee after her outstanding performances in the youth and junior divisions in the season. In her first ever World Cup race, she completed with eleventh place, missing out on the top ten by just one place and 0.02 seconds compared to Sandra Robatscher. In the overall world cup ranking, she reached 43rd place with 34 points, tied with the Pole Natalia Jamróz.

At the inaugural doubles world championships in 2022 in Winterberg, Degenhardt won the title with her doubles partner Cheyenne Rosenthal.

== Luge results ==
All results are sourced from the International Luge Federation (FIL) and German Bobsleigh, Luge and Skeleton Federation (BSD).

=== World Championships ===
- 6 medals (4 gold, 1 silver, 1 bronze)

Event	Age	Doubles	Doubles Sprint	Team relay	Mixed doubles
(Germany) 2022 Winterberg	19	Gold	—	—	
(Germany) 2023 Oberhof	20	Gold	Gold	—	
(Germany) 2024 Altenberg	21	13th	14th	—	
(Canada) 2025 Whistler	22	Silver	—N/a	Gold	Bronze

=== World Cup ===
==== Singles ====
Season	Singles									Sprint			Team relay						Points	Overall	Singles	Sprint
Season	1	2	3	4	5	6	7	8	9	1	2	3	1	2	3	4	5	6	Points	Overall	Singles	Sprint
2019–20	—	—	—	—	—	—	—	—	11	—	—	—	—	—	—	—	—	—	34	43rd	—N/a	—N/a

==== Doubles ====
Season	Doubles									Sprint			Team relay						Points	Overall	Singles	Sprint
Season	1	2	3	4	5	6	7	8	9	1	2	3	1	2	3	4	5	6	Points	Overall	Singles	Sprint
2022–23	2	3	2	3	3	2	1	1	2	10	3	8	—	—	—	—	—	—	898	3rd	2nd	5th
