= 2023 Junior World Luge Championships =

- Venue: Bludenz Vorarlberg
- Location: Bludenz, Austria
- Dates: 14–15 January

The 38th Junior World Luge Championships took place under the auspices of the International Luge Federation in Bludenz, Austria from 14 to 15 January 2023.

== Schedule ==
Five events were held.

All times are local (UTC+1).

| Date | Time | Events |
|---|---|---|
| 14 January | 9:00 | Junior men 1st run |
| 14 January | 9:00 | Junior men 2nd run |
| 14 January | 14:00 | Junior doubles women 1st run |
| 14 January | 14:00 | Junior doubles women 2nd run |
| 15 January | 9:00 | Junior women 1st run |
| 15 January | 9:00 | Junior women 2nd run |
| 15 January | 11:00 | Junior doubles men 1st run |
| 15 January | 11:00 | Junior doubles men 2nd run |
| 15 January | 13:00 | Team relay |

== Medalists ==
| Event | Gold | | Silver | | Bronze | |
|---|---|---|---|---|---|---|
| Junior men's singles | Kaspars Rinks; Latvia | 1:03.833 | Marco Leger; Germany | 1:04.191 | Hannes Röder; Germany | 1:04.260 |
| Junior women's singles | Yulianna Tunytska; Ukraine | 1:04.723 | Barbara Allmaier; Austria | 1:04.934 | Alexandra Oberstolz; Italy | 1:05.071 |
| Junior men's doubles | Latvia; Kaspars Rinks; Vitālijs Jegorovs | 1:06.448 | Germany; Moritz Jäger; Valentin Steudte | 1:06.656 | United States; Marcus Mueller; Ansel Haugsjaa | 1:07.076 |
| Junior women's doubles | Latvia; Viktorija Ziediņa; Selīna Elizabete Zvilna | 1:08.868 | Austria; Lisa Zimmermann; Dorothea Schwarz | 1:08.887 | Latvia; Marta Robežniece; Kitija Bogdanova | 1:09.003 |
| Team relay | Germany; Anka Jänicke; Marco Leger; Moritz Jäger / Valentin Steudte | 1:41.746 | Ukraine; Yulianna Tunytska; Danyil Martsinovskyi; Vadym Mykyievych / Bohdan Babura | 1:43.101 | Latvia; Zane Kaluma; Kaspars Rinks; Raimonds Baltgalvis / Krišjānis Bruns | 1:43.655 |

== Medal table ==
* Host nation (Austria)

| Rank | Nation | Gold | Silver | Bronze | Total |
|---|---|---|---|---|---|
| 1 | Latvia | 3 | 0 | 2 | 5 |
| 2 | Germany | 1 | 2 | 1 | 4 |
| 3 | Ukraine | 1 | 1 | 0 | 2 |
| 4 | Austria* | 0 | 2 | 0 | 2 |
| 5 | Italy | 0 | 0 | 1 | 1 |
| 5 | United States | 0 | 0 | 1 | 1 |
| Totals (6 entries) | | 5 | 5 | 5 | 15 |
