= Cheyenne Rosenthal =

German luger (born 2000)

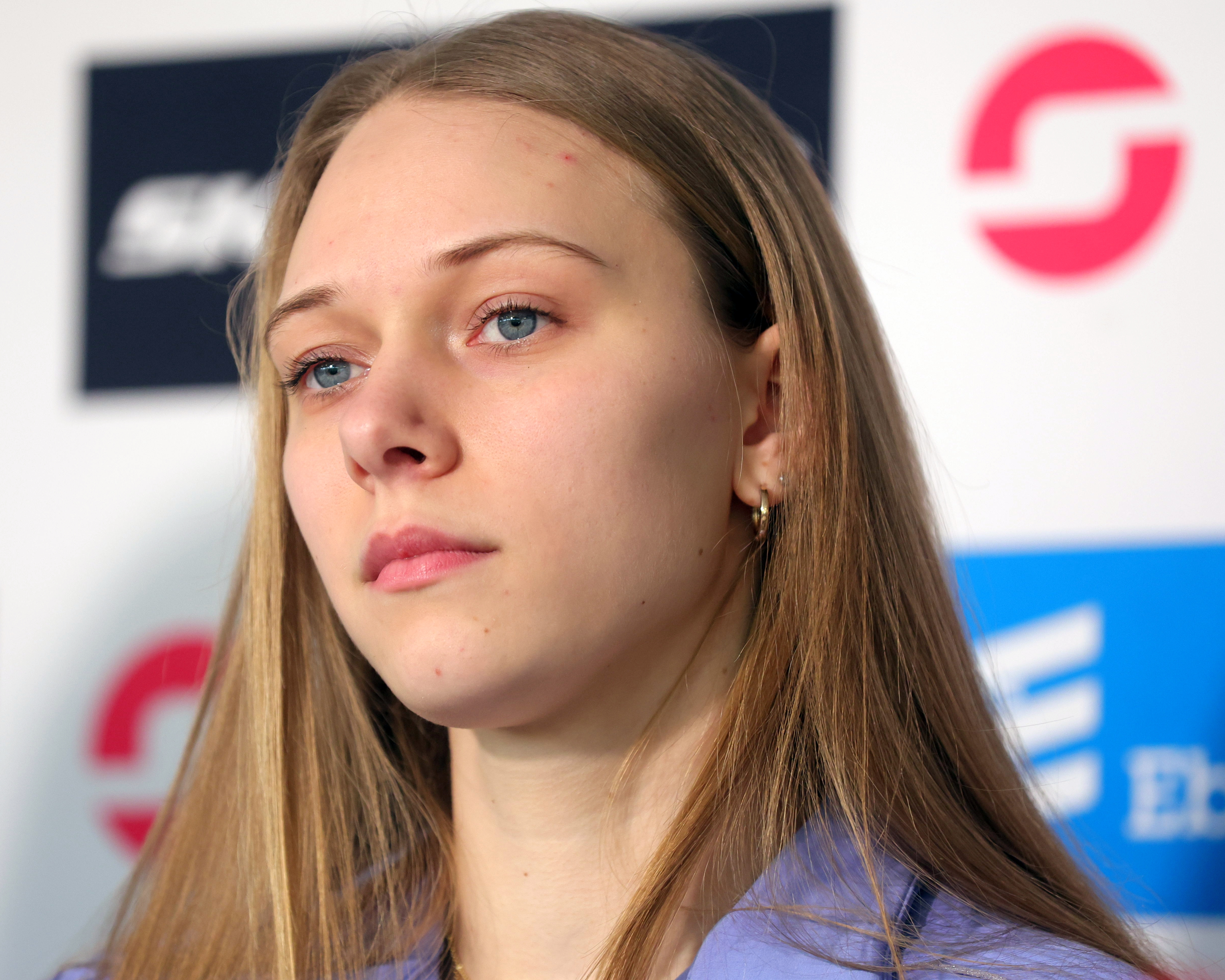
- Rosenthal in 2024

Personal information
- Nationality: German
- Born: 23 July 2000 (age 25)
- Weight: 63 kg (139 lb)

Sport
- Country: Germany
- Sport: Luge
- Event: Singles
- Club: BSC Winterberg
Medal record
Women's luge
Representing Germany
World Championships
Gold medal – first place	2022 Winterberg	Doubles
Gold medal – first place	2023 Oberhof	Doubles
Gold medal – first place	2023 Oberhof	Doubles' sprint
Gold medal – first place	2025 Whistler	Team relay
Silver medal – second place	2025 Whistler	Doubles
Bronze medal – third place	2025 Whistler	Mixed doubles
European Championships
Gold medal – first place	2024 Igls	Doubles
Gold medal – first place	2026 Oberhof	Doubles
Silver medal – second place	2024 Igls	Team relay
Silver medal – second place	2025 Winterberg	Doubles
Silver medal – second place	2025 Winterberg	Team relay
Silver medal – second place	2026 Oberhof	Mixed doubles
Bronze medal – third place	2023 Sigulda	Doubles
Junior World Championships
Gold medal – first place	2019 Innsbruck	Singles
Silver medal – second place	2019 Innsbruck	Team relay

Cheyenne Rosenthal (born 23 July 2000) is a German luger. She is the 2019 Junior World champion, 2018 Junior European champion and the overall winner of the 2017/18 Junior World Cup. She made her Luge World Cup debut in 2019/20 season, and reached her first World Cup podium at the sprint race in Whistler Sliding Centre by finishing in third-place.

== Luge results ==
All results are sourced from the International Luge Federation (FIL) and German Bobsleigh, Luge and Skeleton Federation (BSD).

=== World Championships ===
6 medals (4 gold, 1 silver, 1 bronze)

Event	Age	Singles	Singles Sprint	Doubles	Doubles Sprint	Team relay	Mixed doubles
(Russia) 2020 Sochi	19	8th	10th	—	—	—	—N/a
(Germany) 2022 Winterberg	21	—	—	Gold	—	—	—N/a
(Germany) 2023 Oberhof	22	—	—	Gold	Gold	—	—N/a
(Germany) 2024 Altenberg	23	—	—	13th	14th	—	—N/a
(Canada) 2025 Whistler	24	—	—N/a	Silver	—N/a	Gold	Bronze

=== World Cup ===
==== Singles ====
Season	Singles									Sprint			Team relay						Points	Overall	Singles	Sprint
Season	1	2	3	4	5	6	7	8	9	1	2	3	1	2	3	4	5	6	Points	Overall	Singles	Sprint
2019–20	9	17	10	11	23	8	10	–	8	–	3	5	–	–	–	–	–	–	396	10th	NC	
2020–21	7	12	9	–	–	–	–	11	5	14	–	12	–	–	–	–	–	CNX	–	15th	17th	13th
2021–22	–	–	–	–	–	–	–	5	–	–	–	–	–	–	–	–	–	–	–	40th	38th	–

Note: To be classified in Sprint World Cup standings athletes must compete on all sprint events throughout the season.

==== Doubles ====
Season	Doubles									Sprint			Team relay						Points	Overall	Singles	Sprint
Season	1	2	3	4	5	6	7	8	9	1	2	3	1	2	3	4	5	6	Points	Overall	Singles	Sprint
2022–23	2	3	2	3	3	2	1	1	2	10	3	8	—	—	—	—	—	—	898	3rd	2nd	5th

=== European Championships ===
- 2020 Lillehammer – 19th in Singles (9th in U23 category)

=== U23 World Championships ===
- 2020 Sochi – (silver) in Singles

=== Junior World Championships ===
- 2017 Sigulda – 10th in Singles
- 2018 Altenberg – 11th in Singles
- 2019 Innsbruck – (gold) in Singles, (silver) in Team relay

=== Junior European Championships ===
- 2017 Oberhof – (bronze) in Singles
- 2018 Winterberg – (gold) in Singles, (gold) in Team relay
- 2019 St. Moritz – 7th in Singles

=== German Championships ===
- 2018 Winterberg – 7th in Singles
- 2019 Oberhof – 4th in Singles
