= Matthew Greiner =

American luger

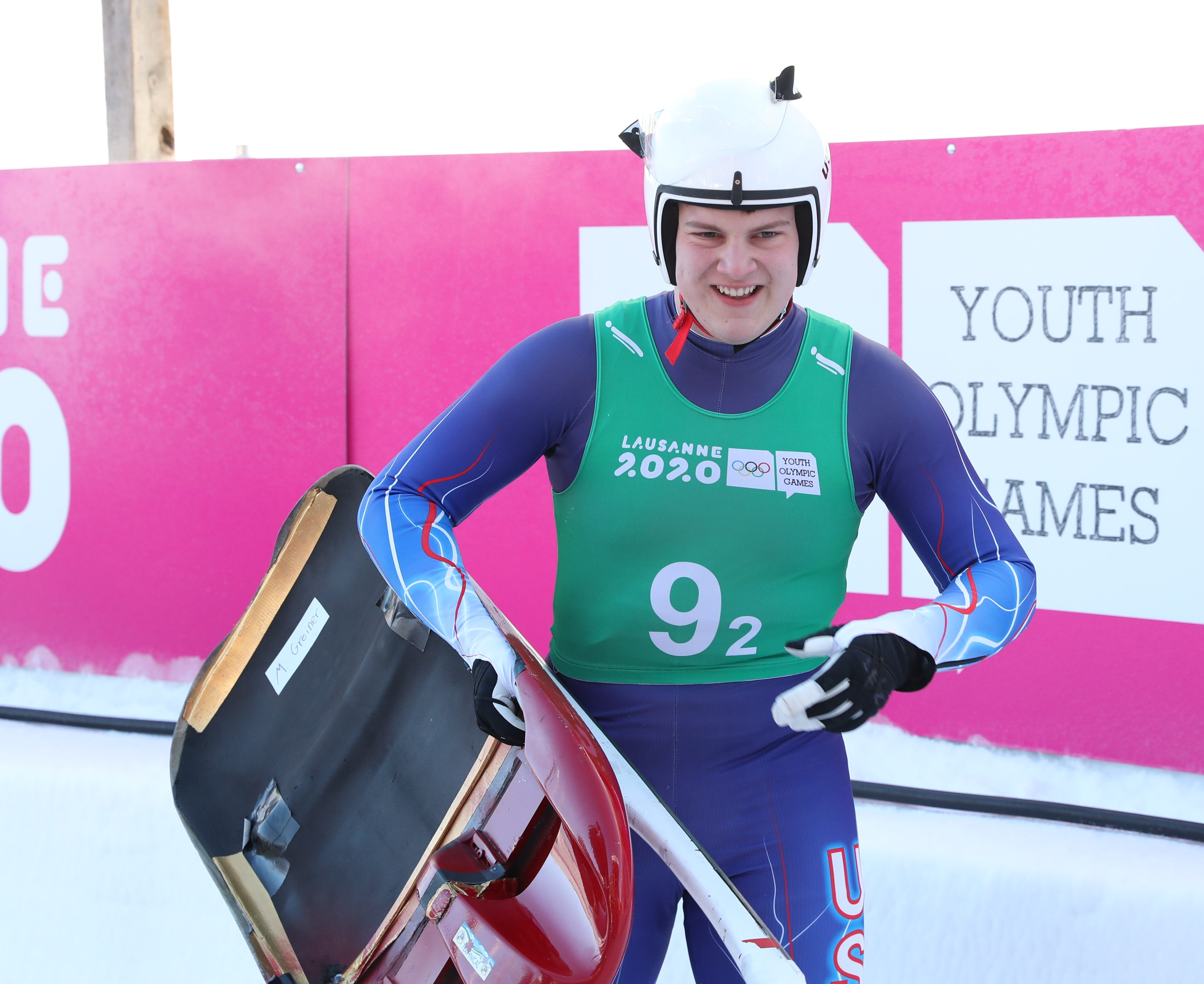
- Greiner at the 2020 Winter Youth Olympics in Lausanne

Personal information
- Nationality: American
- Born: November 5, 2003 (age 22) Abington, Pennsylvania

Sport
- Sport: Luge

Matthew Greiner (born November 5, 2003) is an American luger. He represented the United States at the 2026 Winter Olympics.

== Career ==
Originally from Abington Township, Pennsylvania, he moved to Utah with his family at the age of 6. Greiner began luging in 2014, and won bronze at the 2022 Junior World Luge Championships. Greiner became the first American to medal at the Junior World Luge Championships since 2015. He was selected to represent the United States at the 2026 Winter Olympics, making his Olympic debut. During the men's luge singles, Greiner made into the fourth round after placing the 19th fastest time in the third round, but would ultimately place 20th in the final rankings.
