= Dorothea Schwarz =

Austrian luger (born 2005)

- Schwarz in 2026

Personal information
- Nationality: Austrian
- Born: 21 January 2005 (age 21) Innsbruck, Austria

Sport
- Sport: Luge

Dorothea Schwarz (born 21 January 2005) is an Austrian luger.

== Career ==
In January 2023, Schwarz competed at the 2023 Junior World Luge Championships and won a silver medal in the doubles event, along with Lisa Zimmermann. She then competed at the 2023 FIL World Luge Championships and finished in seventh place in the doubles event and 12th place in the doubles' sprint event.

On 5 December 2025, during the opening race of the FIL Nations Cup she won the singles event with a time of 55.364 seconds. During the 2025–26 Luge World Cup in the season opening race on 7 December 2025, she earned her first Luge World Cup podium finish, coming in third in the singles event. On 20 December 2025, she earned her first mixed singles podium finish, along with Jonas Müller, coming in third with a time of 1:47.987.
