= 2020 Junior World Luge Championships =

- Location: Oberhof bobsleigh, luge, and skeleton track, Oberhof, Germany
- Dates: 21–22 February

The 35th Junior World Luge Championships took place under the auspices of the International Luge Federation in Oberhof, Germany from 21 to 22 February 2020.

== Schedule ==
Four events were held.

All times are local (UTC+1).

Date	Time	Events
21 February	09:30	Junior men 1st run
21 February	09:30	Junior men 2nd run
21 February	12:30	Junior women 1st run
21 February	12:30	Junior women 2nd run
22 February	10:00	Junior doubles 1st run
22 February	10:00	Junior doubles 2nd run
22 February	13:00	Team relay

== Medalists ==
Event	Gold		Silver		Bronze	
Junior Men's singles	Moritz Bollmann; Germany	1:30.057	Gints Bērziņš; Latvia	1:30.261	David Nößler; Germany	1:30.429
Junior Women's singles	Jessica Degenhardt; Germany	1:23.315	Diana Loginova; Russia	1:23.331	Lisa Schulte; Austria	1:23.387
Junior Doubles	Russia; Dmitry Buchnev; Daniil Kilseev	1:17.619	Germany; Max Ewald; Jakob Jannusch	1:17.840	Russia; Mikhail Karnaukhov; Iurii Chirva	1:17.873
Team relay	Germany; Jessica Degenhardt; Moritz Bollmann; Max Ewald; Jakob Jannusch	2:16.409	Latvia; Elīna Ieva Vītola; Gints Bērziņš; Eduards Ševics-Mikeļševics; Lūkass Krasts	2:16.529	Russia; Diana Loginova; Matvey Perestoronin; Dmitry Buchnev; Daniil Kilseev	2:16.785

== Medal table ==
* Host nation (Germany)

Rank	Nation	Gold	Silver	Bronze	Total
1	Germany (GER)*	3	1	1	5
2	Russia (RUS)	1	1	2	4
3	Latvia (LAT)	0	2	0	2
4	Austria (AUT)	0	0	1	1
Totals (4 entries)		4	4	4	12
