= 2022 Junior World Luge Championships =

- Venue: Winterberg bobsleigh, luge, and skeleton track
- Location: Winterberg, Germany
- Dates: 28–29 January

The 37th Junior World Luge Championships took place under the auspices of the International Luge Federation in Winterberg, Germany from 28 to 29 January 2022.

== Schedule ==
Five events were held.

All times are local (UTC+1).

Date	Time	Events
28 January	10:00	Junior men 1st run
28 January	10:00	Junior men 2nd run
28 January	13:30	Junior doubles women 1st run
28 January	13:30	Junior doubles women 2nd run
29 January	10:00	Junior women 1st run
29 January	10:00	Junior women 2nd run
29 January	13:30	Junior doubles men 1st run
29 January	13:30	Junior doubles men 2nd run
29 January	15:30	Team relay

== Medalists ==
Event	Gold		Silver		Bronze	
Junior men's singles	Matvei Perestoronin; Russia	1:52.736	Florian Müller; Germany	1:53.205	Matthew Greiner; United States	1:53.213
Junior women's singles	Jessica Degenhardt; Germany	1:29.117	Sofiia Mazur; Russia	1:29.193	Merle Fräbel; Germany	1:29.505
Junior men's doubles	Latvia; Eduards Ševics-Mikeļševics; Lūkass Krasts	1:35.987	Austria; Juri Gatt; Riccardo Schöpf	1:36.311	Germany; Moritz Jäger; Valentin Steudte	1:36.392
Junior women's doubles	Germany; Luisa Romanenko; Pauline Patz	1:36.368	Latvia; Marta Robežniece; Kitija Bogdanova	1:36.417	Latvia; Viktorija Ziediņa; Selīna Elizabete Zvilna	1:36.814
Team relay	Germany; Jessica Degenhardt; Florian Müller; Moritz Jäger / Valentin Steudte	2:25.617	Russia; Sofiia Mazur; Matvei Perestoronin; Mikhail Karnaukhov / Iurii Chirva	2:25.889	Latvia; Zane Kaluma; Kaspars Rinks; Eduards Ševics-Mikeļševics / Lūkass Krasts	2:26.175

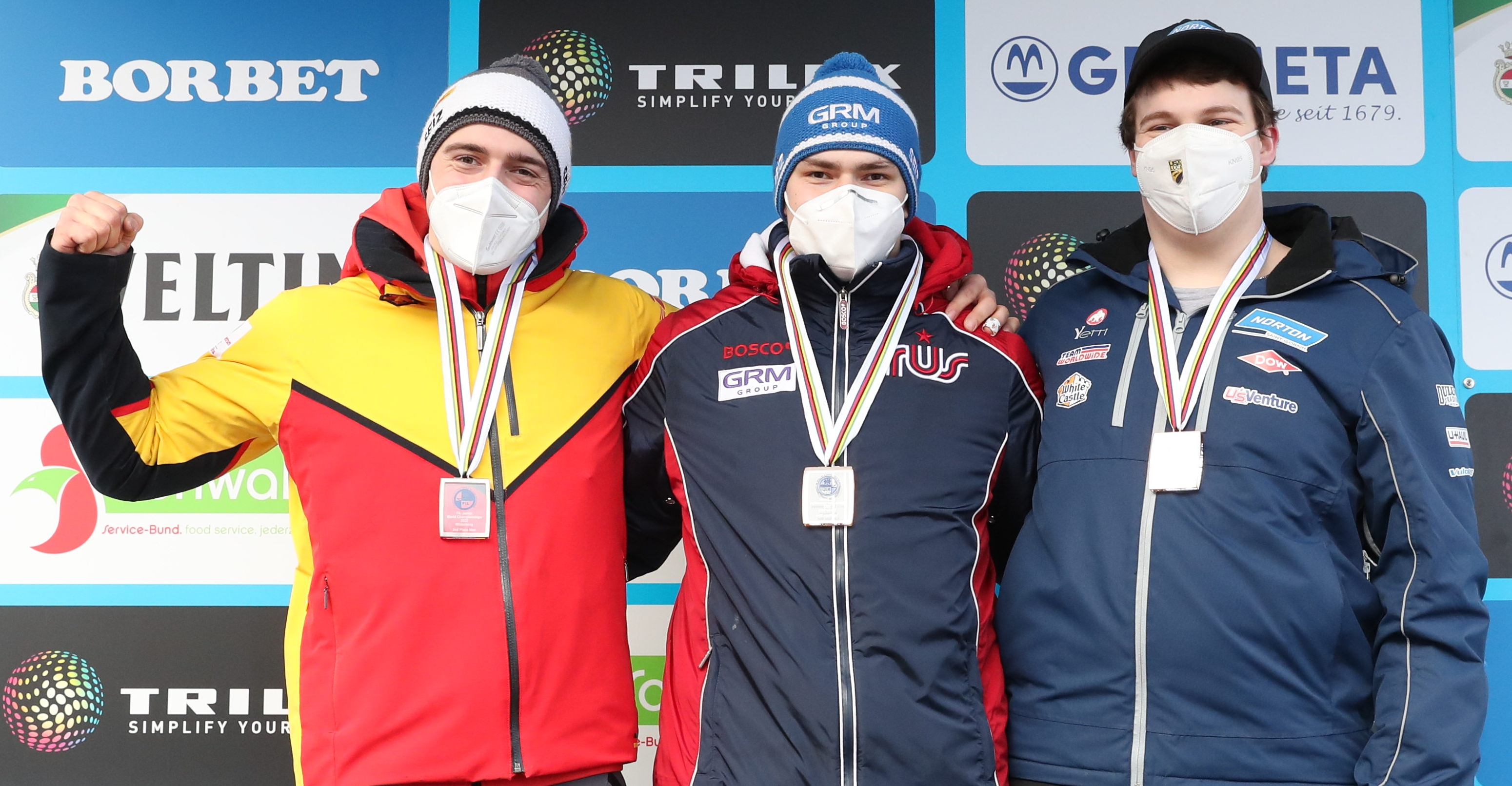
Junior men's singles

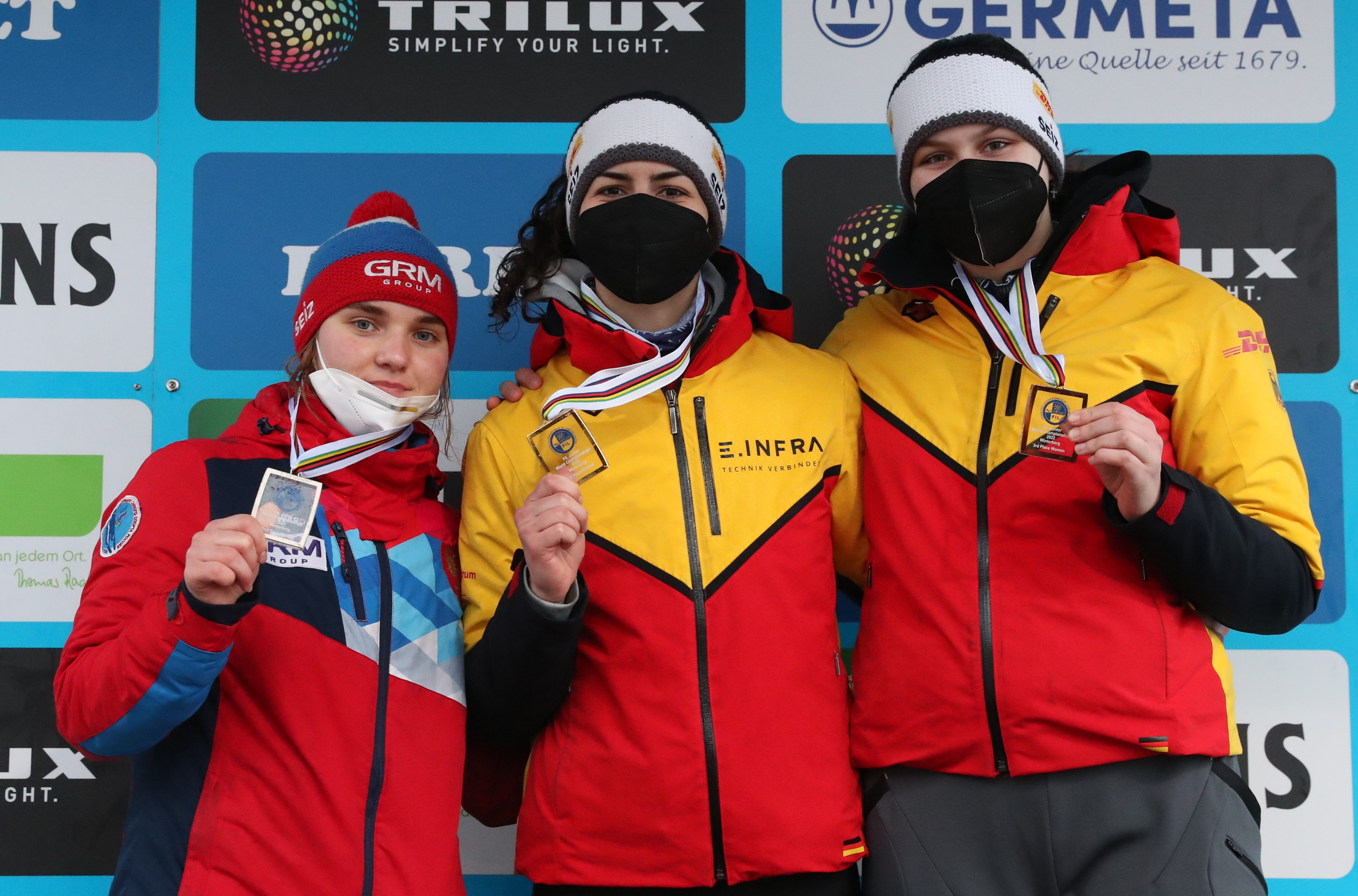
Junior women's singles

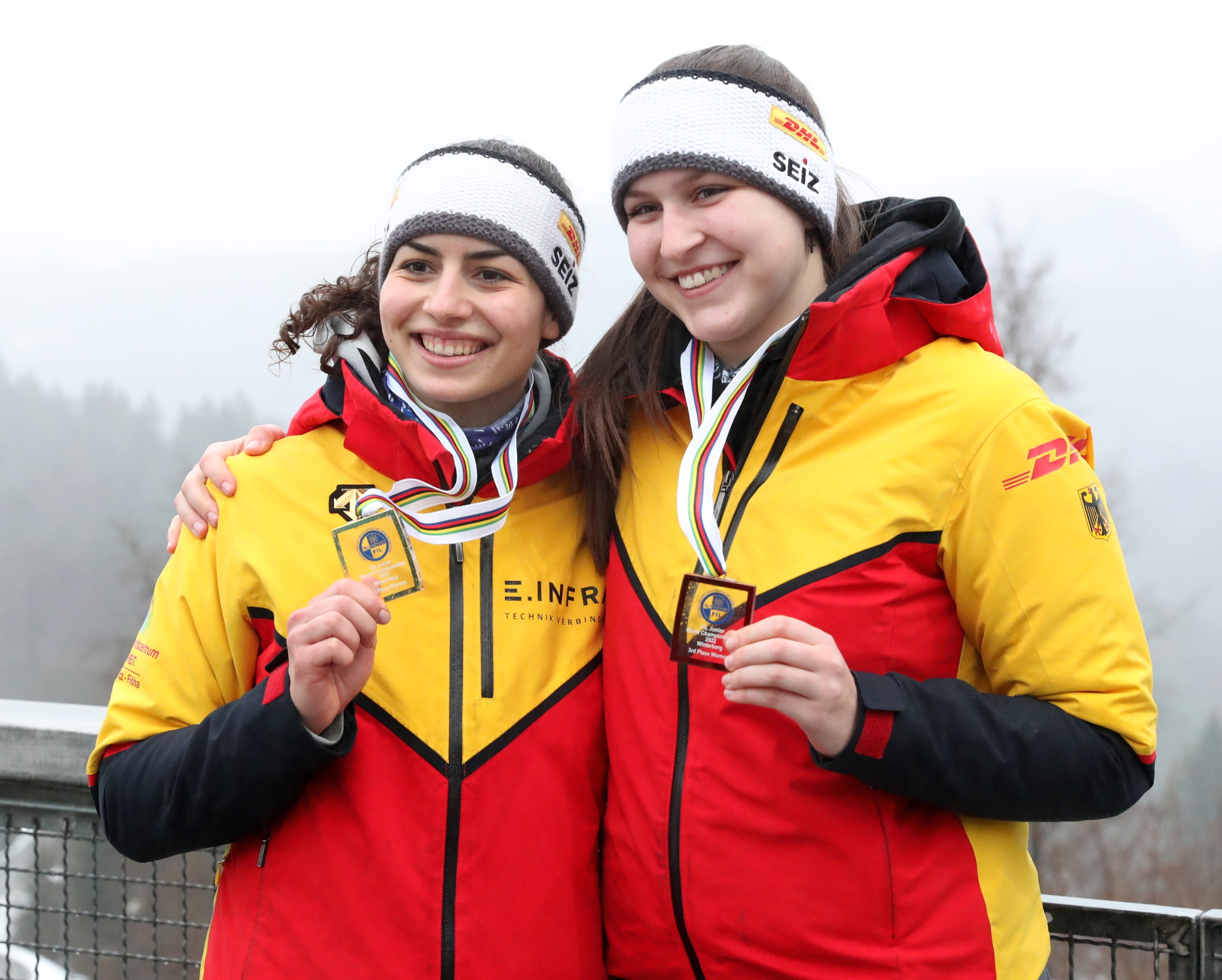
Degenhardt and Fräbel

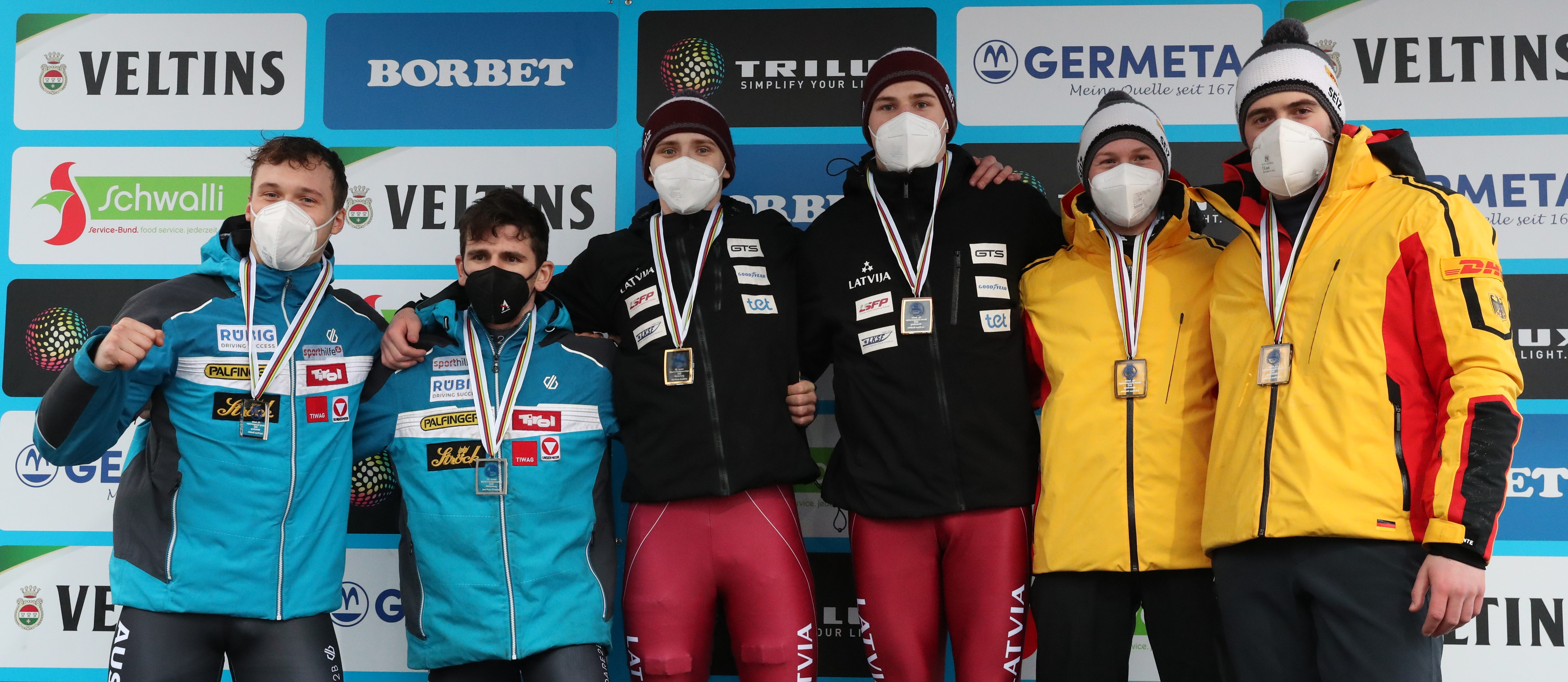
Junior men's doubles

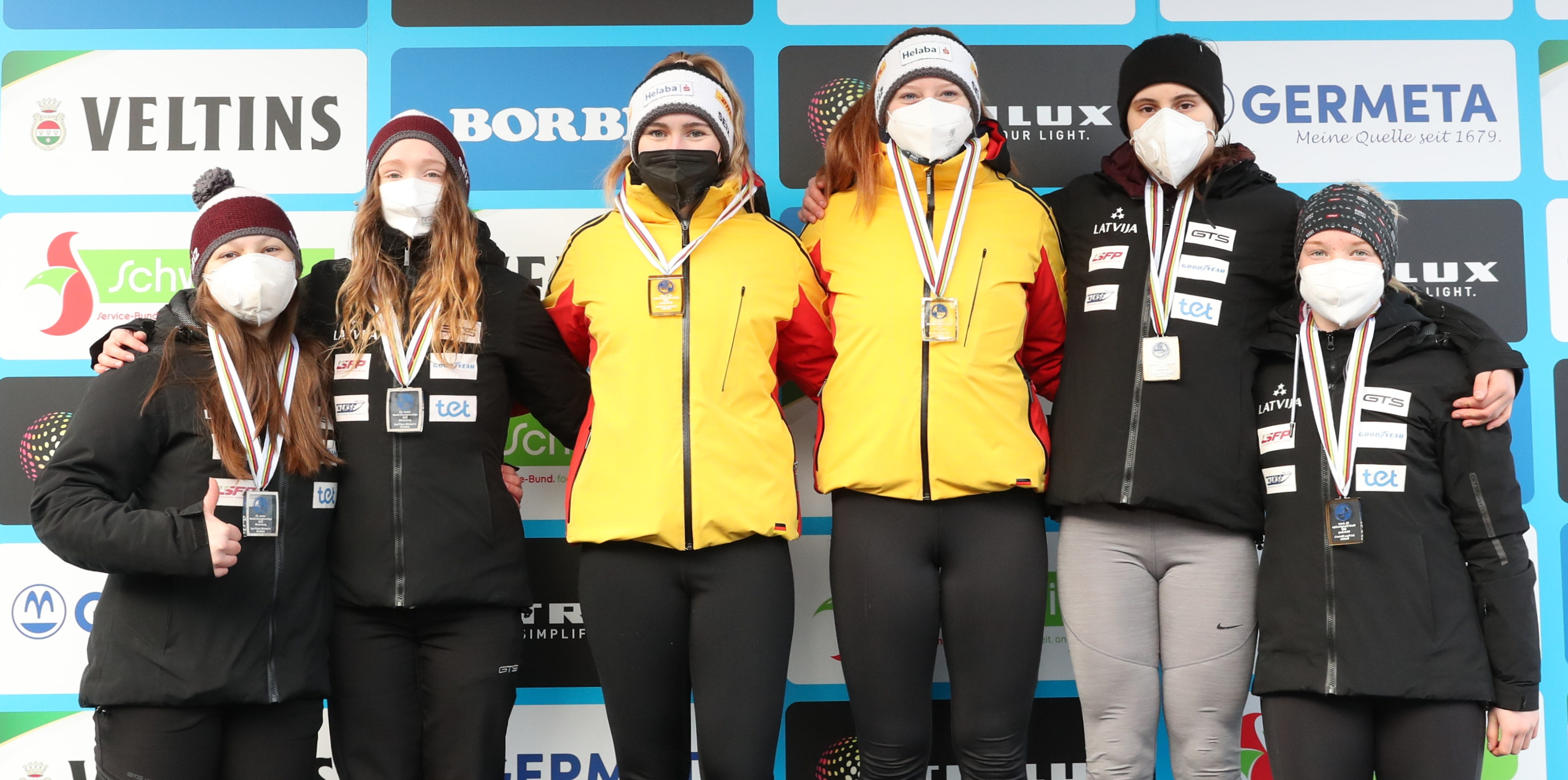
Junior women's doubles

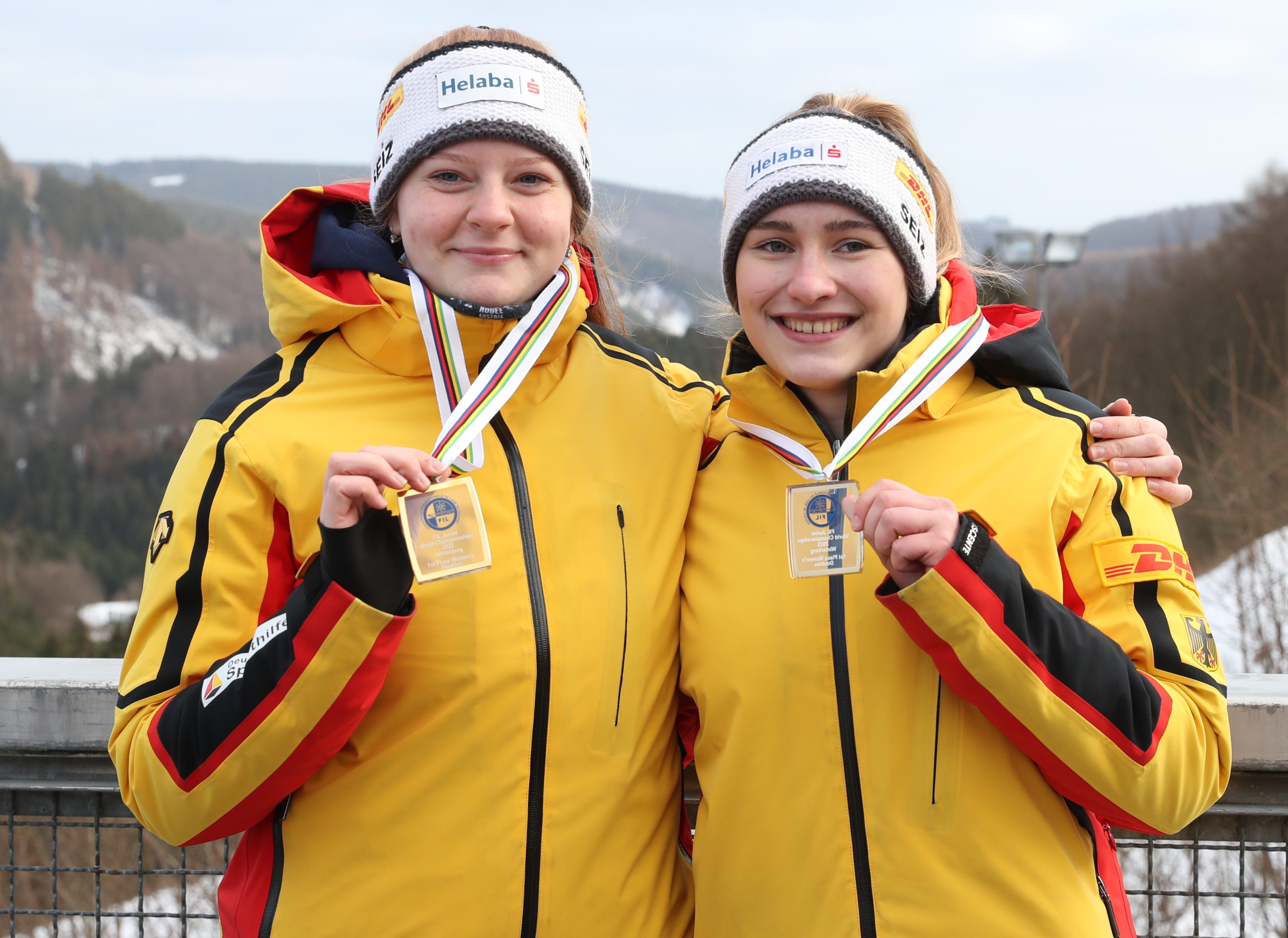
Romanenko/Patz

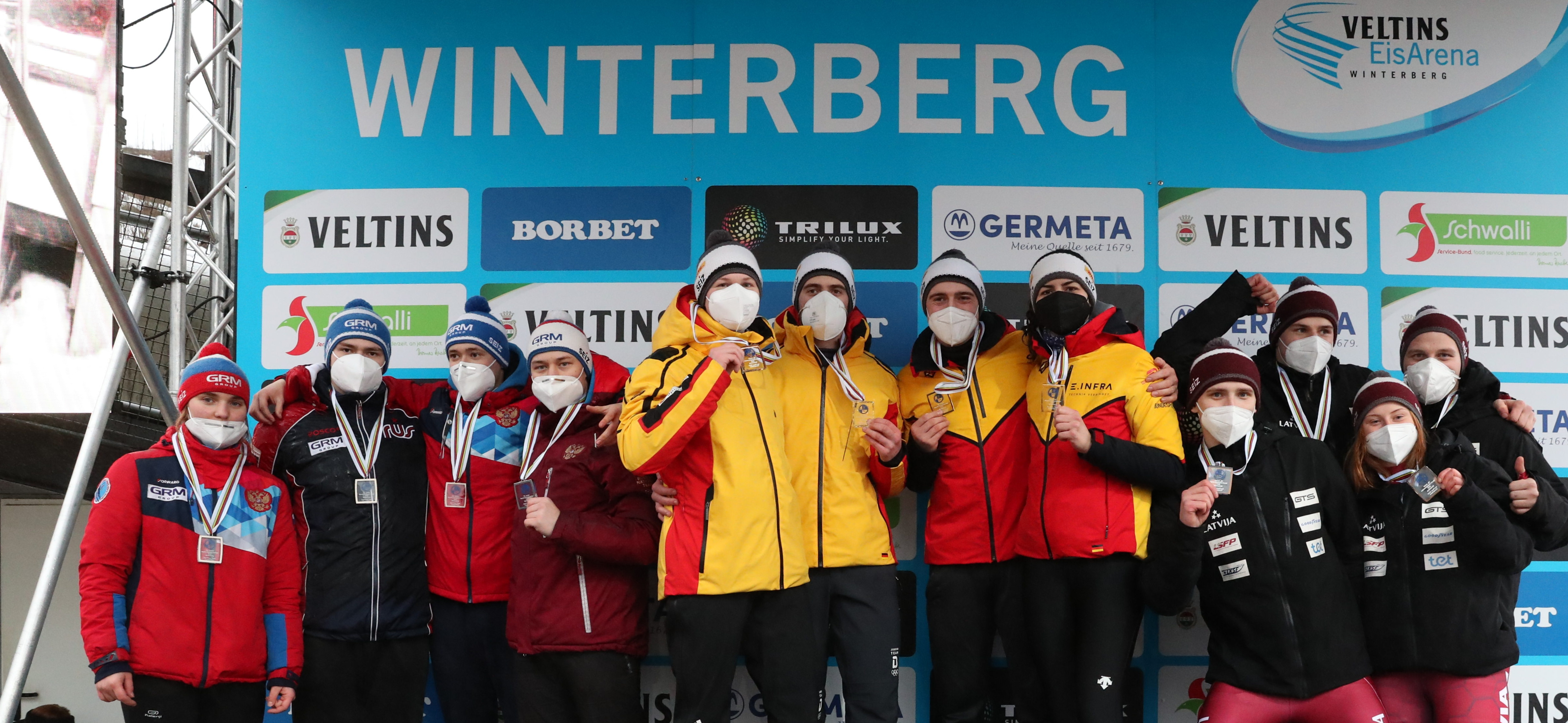
Team competition

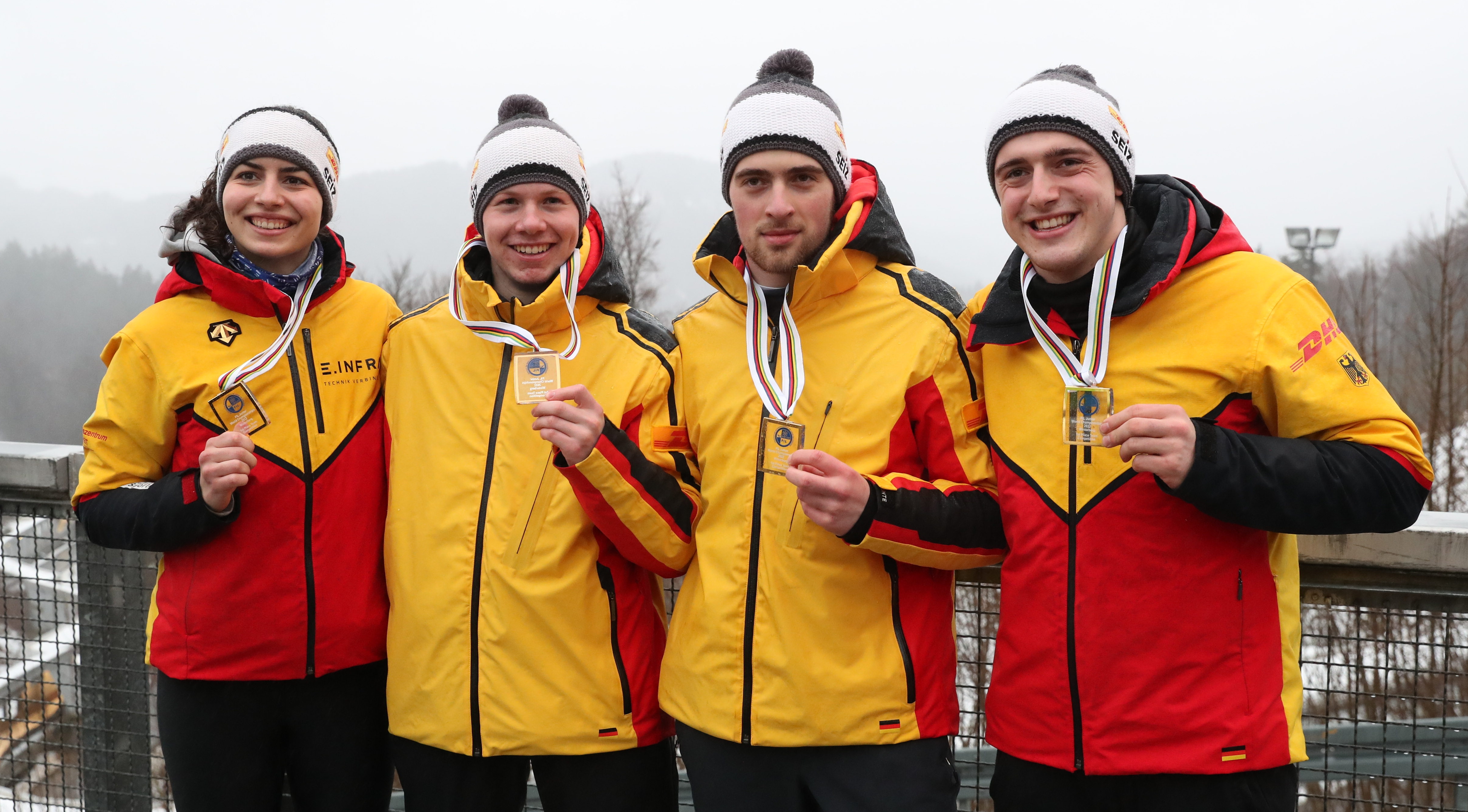
Team Germany

== Medal table ==
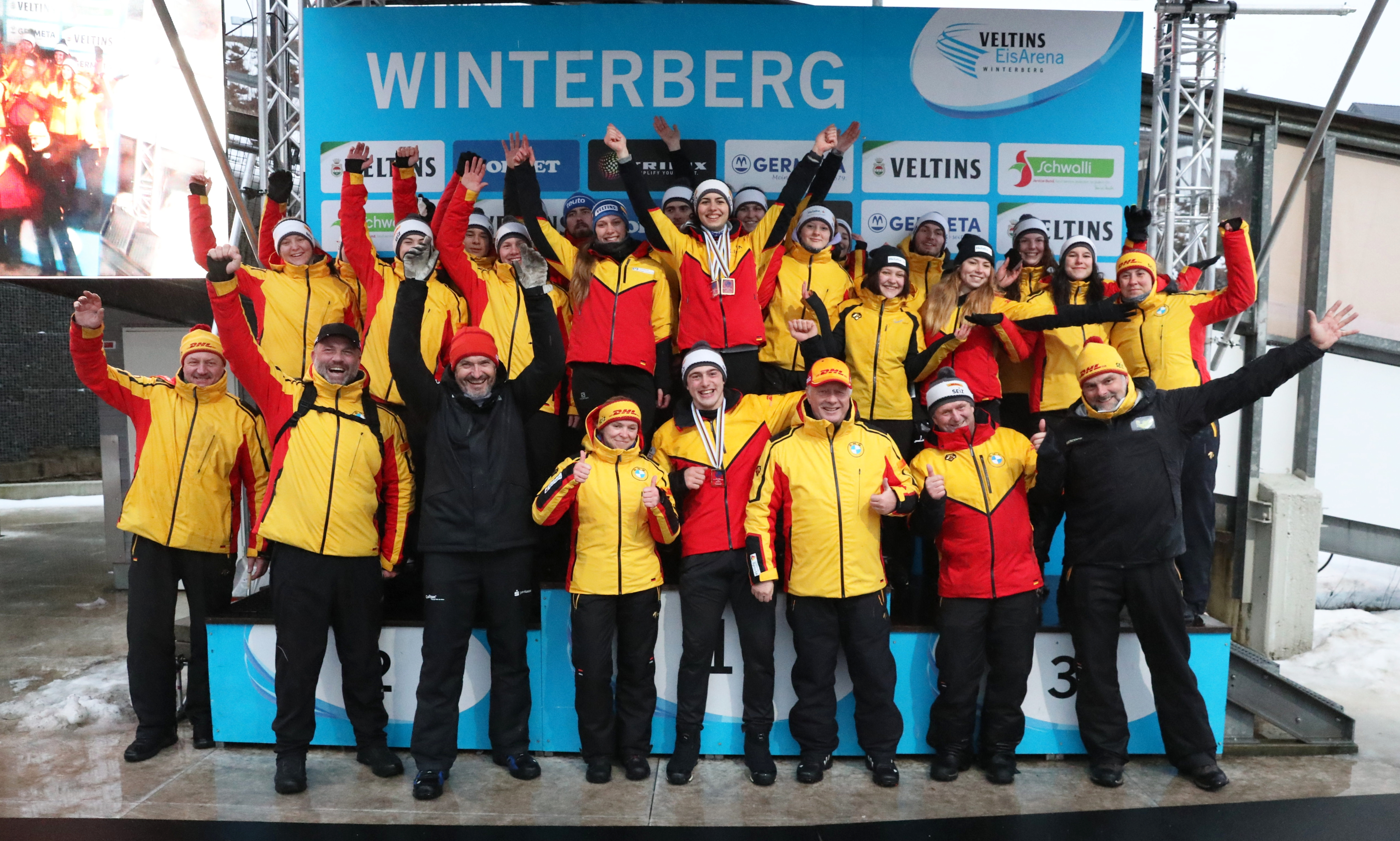
Team Germany

* Host nation (Germany)

Rank	Nation	Gold	Silver	Bronze	Total
1	Germany*	3	1	2	6
2	Russia	1	2	0	3
3	Latvia	1	1	2	4
4	Austria	0	1	0	1
5	United States	0	0	1	1
Totals (5 entries)		5	5	5	15
