= Natalie Corless =

Canadian luger (born 2003)

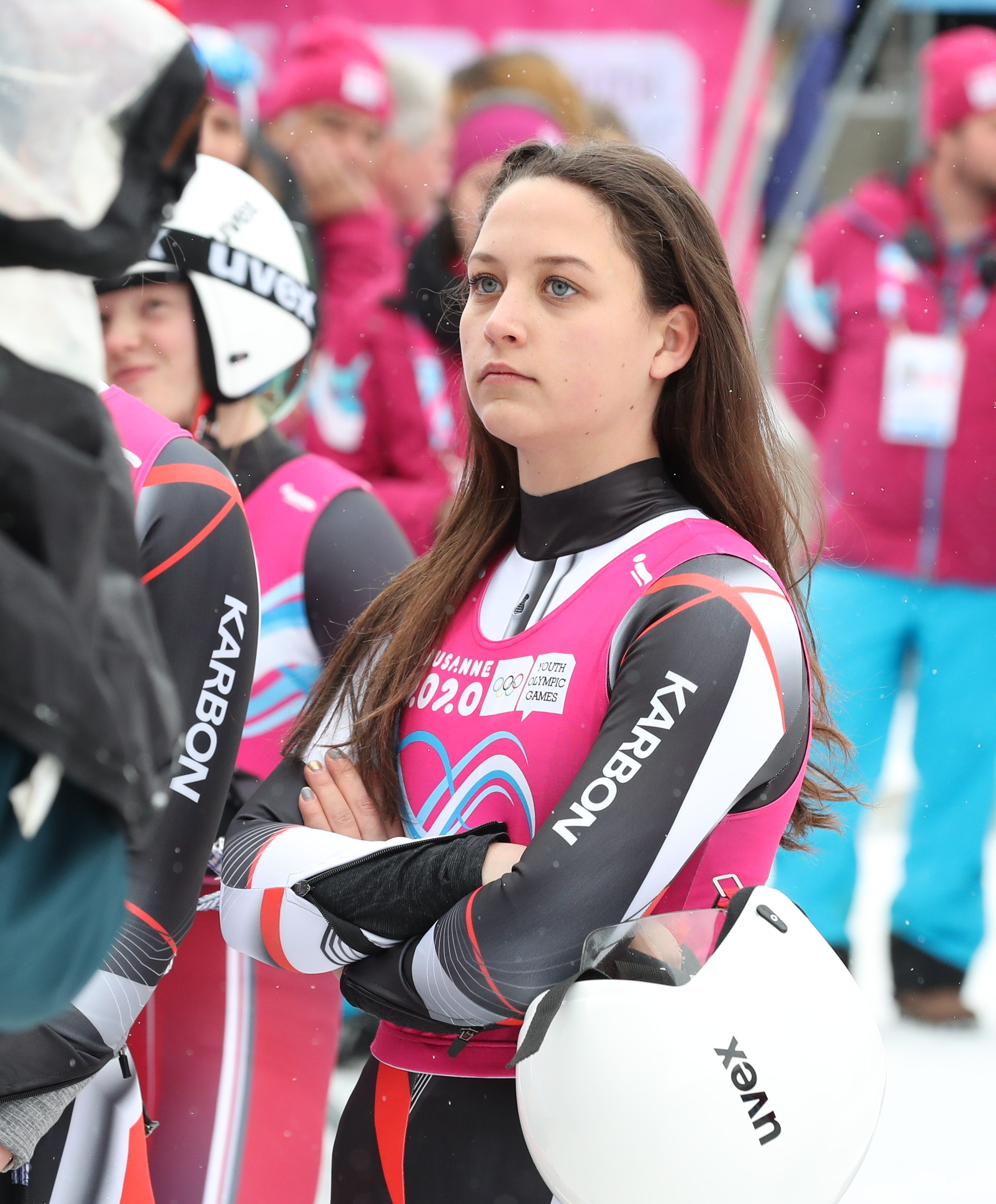
- Corless at the 2020 Winter Youth Olympics

Personal information
- Nationality: Canadian
- Born: 27 November 2003 (age 22) New Westminster, British Columbia, Canada
- Height: 166 cm (5 ft 5 in)

Sport
- Country: Canada
- Sport: Luge
Medal record
Winter Youth Olympics
Silver medal – second place	2020 Lausanne	Girls' doubles

Natalie Corless (born 27 November 2003) is a Canadian luger.

== Career ==
At the age of 16 in December 2019, Natalie Corless, along with Caitlin Nash, became the first women ever to compete in a FIL World Cup doubles race. They finished in 22nd place out of 23 sleds (the last sled crashed out). A month later the pair would go onto compete at the first ever girls' doubles event at the Winter Youth Olympics, winning silver.

For the 2021–22 season, Corless switched focus to the singles event.

In January 2022, Corless was named to Canada's 2022 Olympic team.
