= Nowiny Wielkie =

- Village
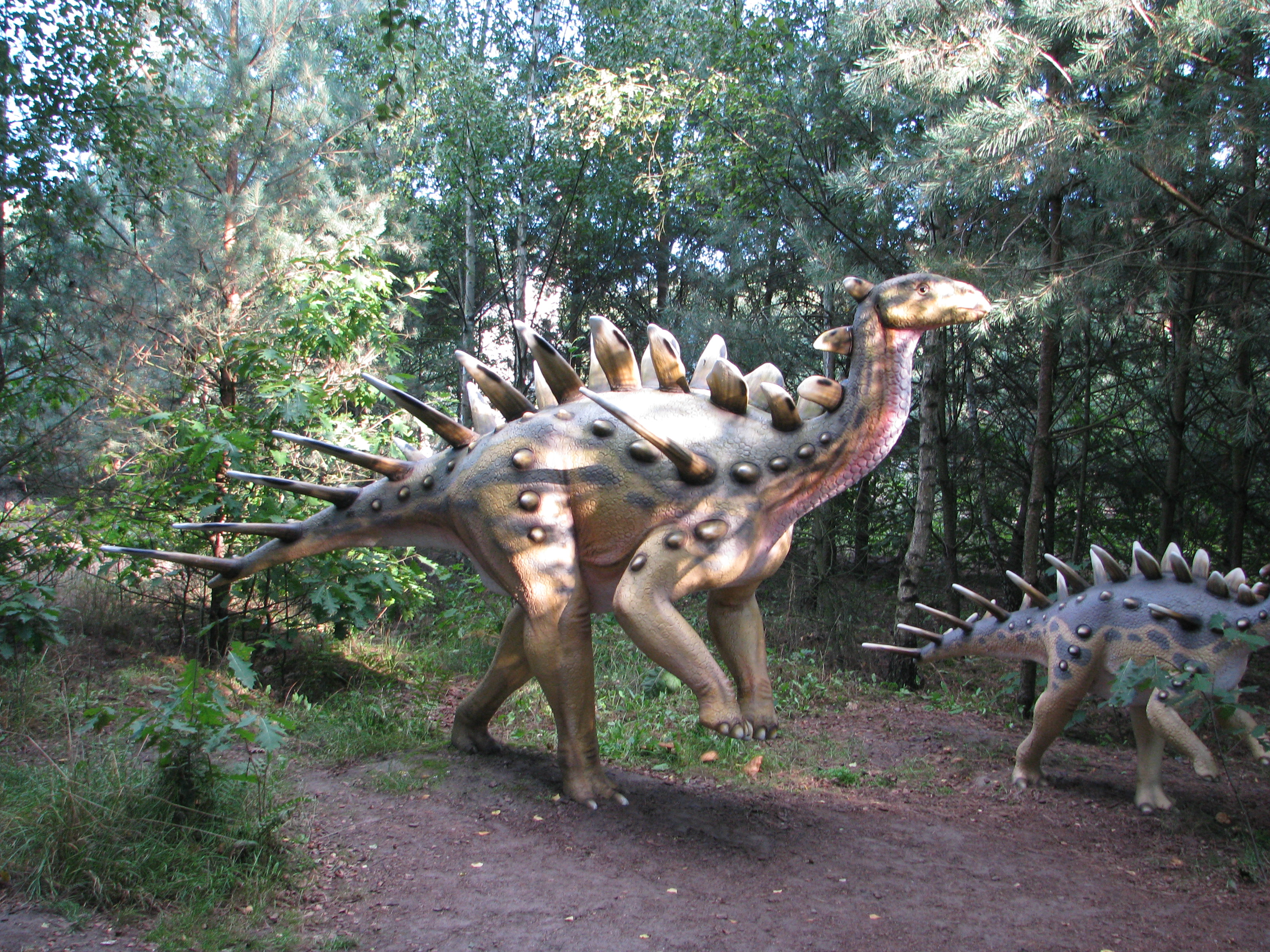
- Dinosaur park in Nowiny Wielkie

- Location within Poland
- Coordinates: 52°40′17″N 15°0′15″E
- Country: Poland
- Voivodeship: Lubusz
- County: Gorzów
- Gmina: Witnica

Population
  - Total: 1,300
- Time zone: UTC+1 (CET)
  - Summer (DST): UTC+2 (CEST)
- Vehicle registration: FGW

Nowiny Wielkie ([nɔˈvinɨ ˈvjɛlkʲɛ]; German: Döllensradung) is a village in the administrative district of Gmina Witnica, within Gorzów County, Lubusz Voivodeship, in western Poland.

During World War II, the German administration operated a forced labour subcamp of the Stalag III-C prisoner-of-war camp in the village.
