= Sophia Kirkby =

American luger (born 2001)

Sophia Kirkby OLY
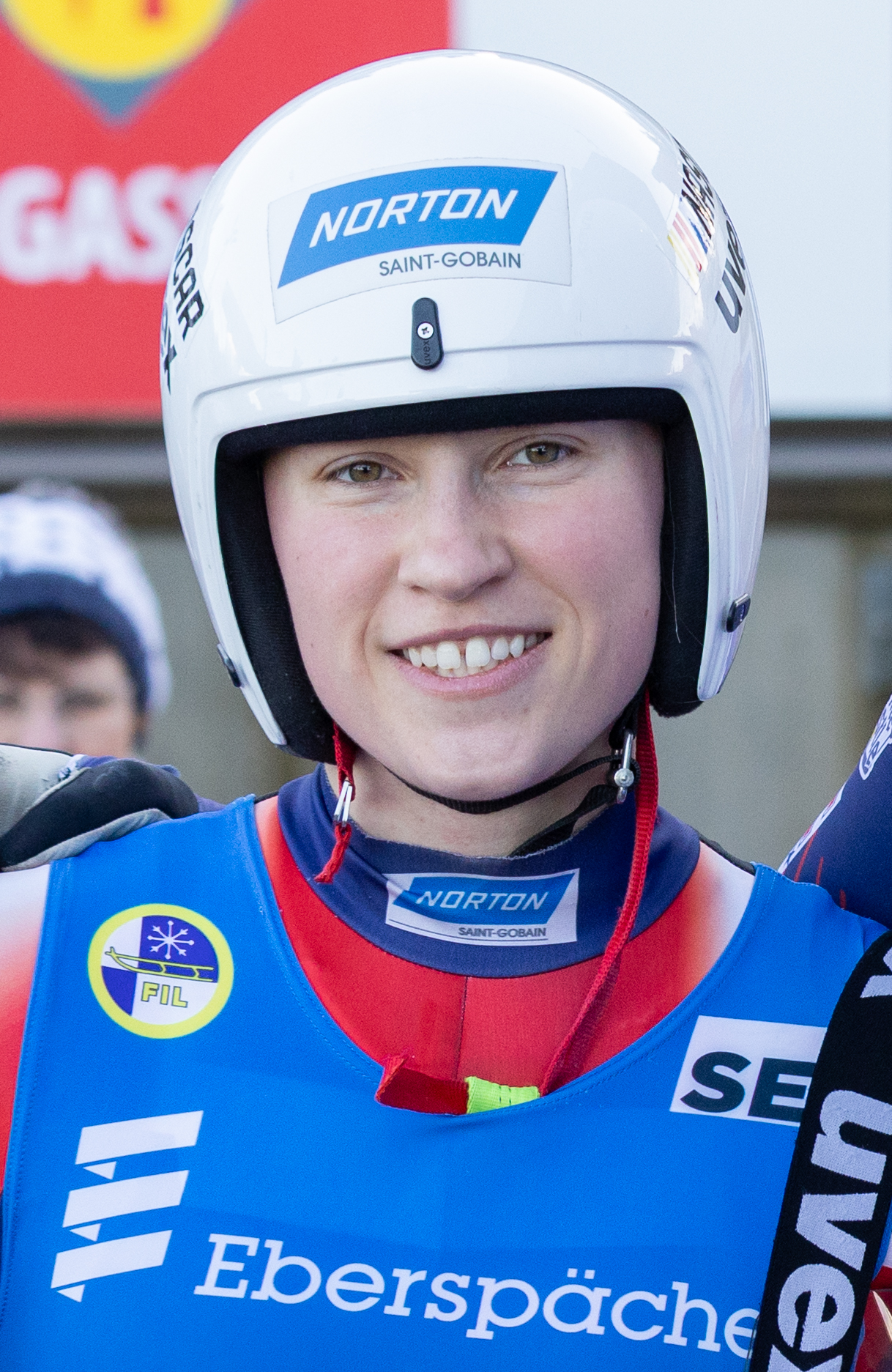
- Kirkby in 2026

Personal information
- Born: June 14, 2001 (age 25) Ray Brook, New York, U.S.

Sport
- Sport: Luge
- Event: Doubles
Medal record
Women's luge
Representing the United States
World Championships
Silver medal – second place	2024 Alternberg	Team relay
Bronze medal – third place	2022 Winterberg	Doubles
Bronze medal – third place	2024 Altenberg	Doubles

Sophia Kirkby (born June 14, 2001) is an American luger.

== Early life ==
Kirkby was born in Ray Brook, New York and began luge at 8 years old with the Adirondack Luge Club. When she was 10 years old, she received an invitation to the development team from USA Luge.

== Career ==
Kirkby has been with Team USA since she was 16, playing in singles events on the junior national team. She switched to doubles in 2020, and races with her teammate Chevonne Forgan. Forgan serves as the supine, steering the sled from up top, while Kirby navigates the runs from underneath. During the 2022–23 Luge World Cup, Kirkby and Forgan finished in fifth place in the overall World Cup women's doubles standings.

Kirkby represented the United States at the 2022 FIL World Luge Championships and won a bronze medal in the inaugural women's doubles event at the FIL World Luge Championships.

She competed at the 2023 FIL World Luge Championships where she came in sixth place in the doubles and doubles sprint events.

She competed at the 2024 FIL World Luge Championships and won a silver medal in the team relay and a bronze medal in the women's doubles event. During the doubles event they tied the start record of 5.925, and track record of 42.334.

== Personal life ==
Outside of luge, Kirkby's interest includes ceramics, where she produces Adirondack-themed mugs, among other things, at the Lake Placid Center of the Arts. She plans to start a business in 2024 called Sophie's Ceramics and Services.
