= 2024 FIL World Luge Championships – Team relay =

Team relay at the 2024 FIL World Luge Championships
- Venue: Altenberg bobsleigh, luge, and skeleton track
- Location: Altenberg, Germany
- Dates: 28 January
- Competitors: 54 from 9 nations
- Teams: 9
- Winning time: 3:10.869

Medalists
gold medal	Julia Taubitz; Tobias Wendl; Tobias Arlt; Max Langenhan; Dajana Eitberger; Saskia Schirmer	Germany
silver medal	Summer Britcher; Dana Kellogg; Frank Ike; Tucker West; Chevonne Forgan; Sophia Kirkby	United States
bronze medal	Elīna Ieva Vītola; Mārtiņš Bots; Roberts Plūme; Kristers Aparjods; Anda Upīte; Zane Kaluma	Latvia

The Team relay competition at the 2024 FIL World Luge Championships was held on 28 January 2024.

== Results ==
The race was started at 14:03.

Rank	Bib	Country	Total	Diff
1st place, gold medalist(s)	8	Germany	3:10.869	
2nd place, silver medalist(s)	6	United States	3:11.227	+0.358
3rd place, bronze medalist(s)	7	Latvia	3:11.275	+0.046
4	5	Italy	3:11.877	+1.008
5	1	China	3:14.413	+3.544
6	9	Austria	3:14.645	+3.776
7	4	Poland	3:14.756	+3.887
8	2	Ukraine	3:15.102	+4.233
9	3	Romania	3:15.943	+5.074
