= Nikola Domowicz =

Polish luger (born 2002)

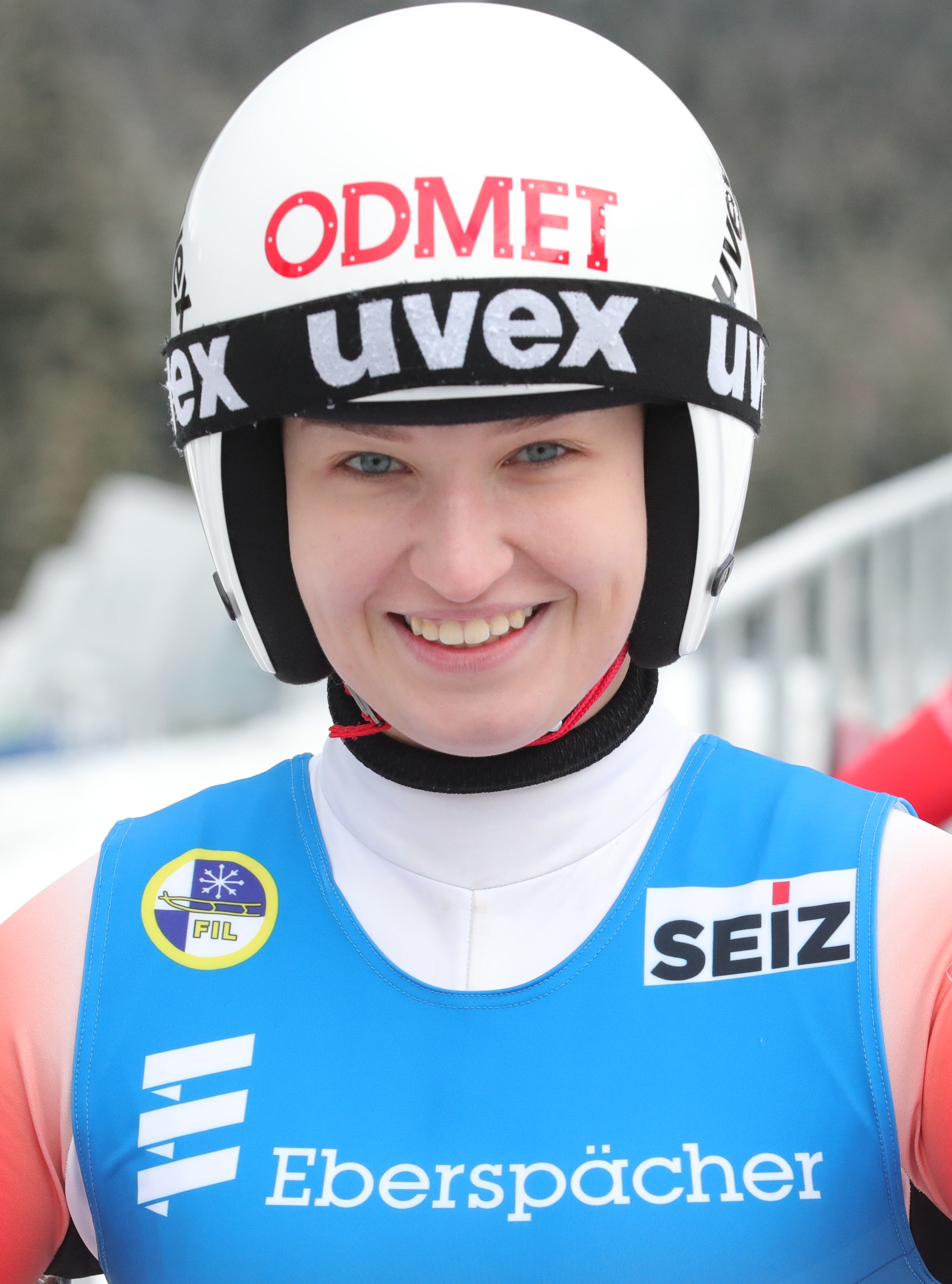
- Domowicz in 2023

Personal information
- Nationality: Polish
- Born: 30 August 2002 (age 23) Nowiny Wielkie, Poland

Sport
- Partner: Dominika Piwkowska

Nikola Domowicz (born 30 August 2002, in Nowiny Wielkie) is a Polish luger. She competed in the women's doubles event at 2026 Winter Olympic Games.

== Luge results ==
Event	With	Women's Double	Run 1	Run 2	Total
(Italy) 2026 Milano Cortina	Dominika Piwkowska	6th	54.247	53.989	1:48.236
