= Chevonne Forgan =

American luger (born 2000)

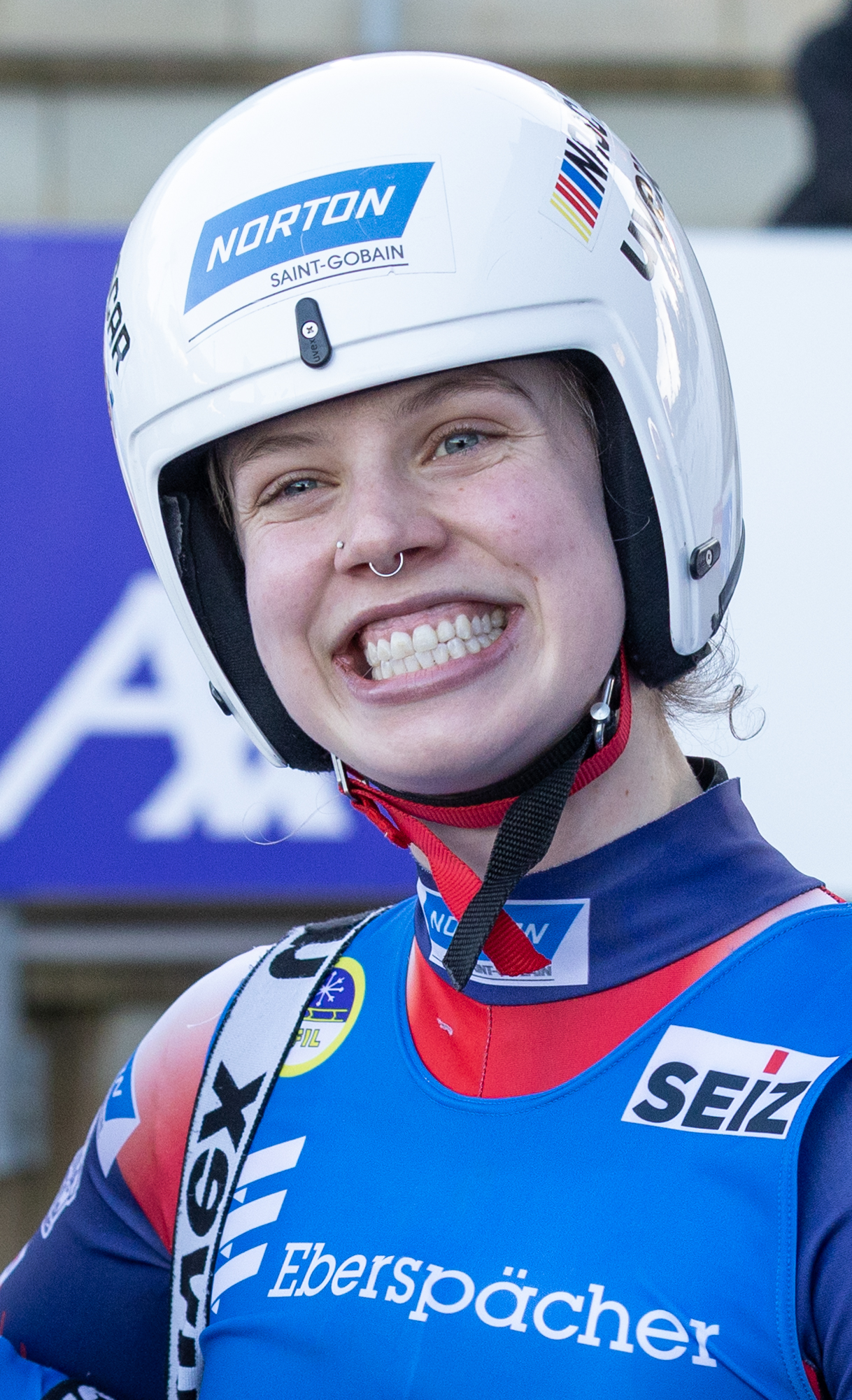
- Forgan in 2026

Personal information
- Nationality: American
- Born: June 30, 2000 (age 25) Adelaide, South Australia
- Home town: Chelmsford, Massachusetts, U.S.

Sport
- Sport: Luge
- Event: Doubles
Medal record
Women's luge
Representing the United States
World Championships
Silver medal – second place	2024 Alternberg	Team relay
Bronze medal – third place	2022 Winterberg	Doubles
Bronze medal – third place	2024 Altenberg	Doubles

Chevonne Forgan (born June 30, 2000) is an American luger.

== Early life ==
Forgan was born in Adelaide, South Australia, and moved to Chelmsford, Massachusetts in 2011. In 2012 she attended the USA Luge Slider Search, and in May 2013 it was announced she made the USA Luge Junior Development Team.

After graduating from Chelmsford High School in 2018, she relocated to Lake Placid, New York, where she trains full-time.

== Career ==
Forgan switched to doubles in 2020, and races with her teammate Sophia Kirkby. Forgan serves as the supine, steering the sled from up top, while Kirby navigates the runs from underneath. During the 2022–23 Luge World Cup, Forgan and Kirkby, finished in fifth place in the overall World Cup women's doubles standings.

Forgan represented the United States at the 2022 FIL World Luge Championships and won a bronze medal in the inaugural women's doubles event at the FIL World Luge Championships.

She competed at the 2023 FIL World Luge Championships where she came in sixth place in the doubles and doubles sprint events.

She competed at the 2024 FIL World Luge Championships and won a silver medal in the team relay and a bronze medal in the women's doubles event. During the doubles event they tied the start record of 5.925, and track record of 42.334.
