= Magdalena Matschina =

German luger (born 2005)

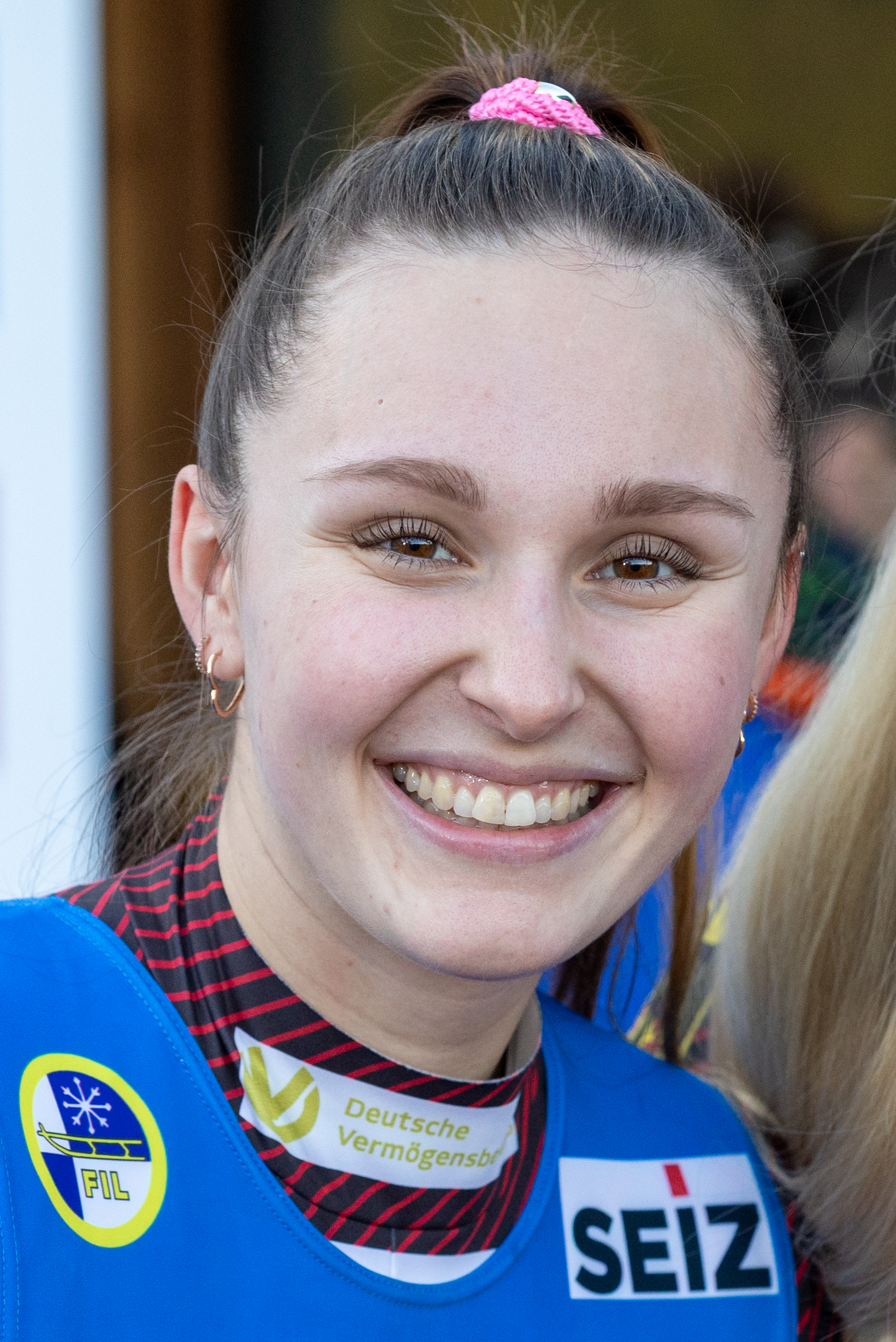
- Matschina in 2026

Personal information
- Nationality: German
- Born: 23 March 2005 (age 21) Bad Aibling, Germany

Sport
- Sport: Luge
Medal record
Women's luge
Representing Germany
Olympic Games
| Gold medal – first place | 2026 Milano Cortina | Team relay |
| Silver medal – second place | 2026 Milano Cortina | Doubles |
World Championships
| Silver medal – second place | 2025 Whistler | Mixed doubles |
| Bronze medal – third place | 2025 Whistler | Doubles |
European Championships
| Gold medal – first place | 2026 Oberhof | Team relay |
| Bronze medal – third place | 2026 Oberhof | Doubles |

Magdalena Matschina (born 23 March 2005) is a German luger.

== Career ==
Matschina began her doubles career with Annika Krause during the 2021–22 season. Prior to the start of the season, she suffered a coccyx fracture in a fall during training and did not compete until the season finale.

In July 2024, it was announced she would compete with Dajana Eitberger in doubles beginning during the 2024–25 Luge World Cup. She represented Germany at the 2025 FIL World Luge Championships and won a silver medal in the inaugural mixed doubles event at the FIL World Luge Championships with a time of 1:22.912 on the first day of the competition. She also won a bronze medal in the doubles event.

At the 2026 Winter Olympics, Matschina won gold in the Team relay event and silver in the Women's Doubles event with Eitberger.

== Personal life ==
Matschina is a police officer.
