= Dominika Piwkowska =

Polish luger (born 2003)

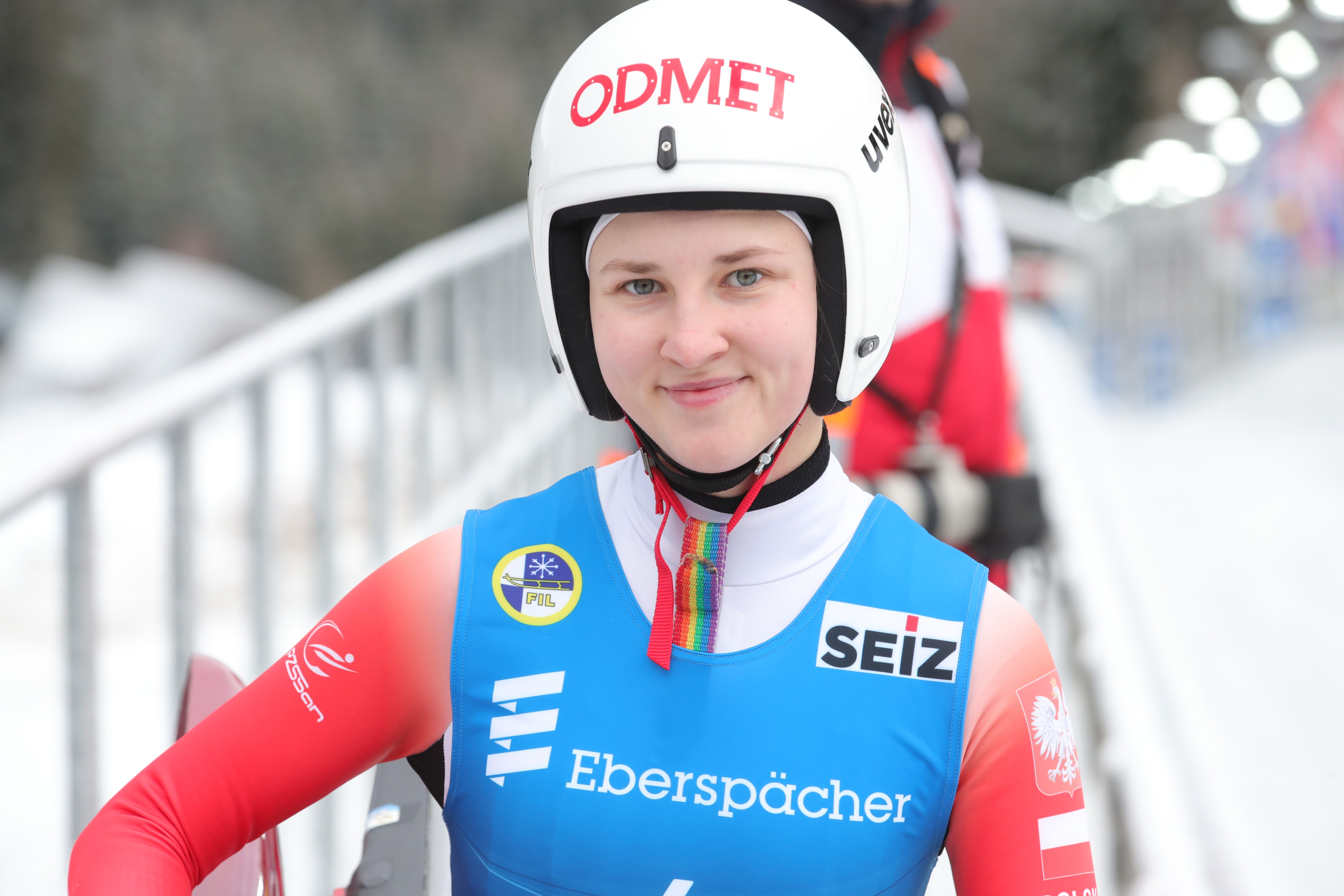
- Piwkowska in 2023

Personal information
- Nationality: Polish
- Born: 18 February 2003 (age 23) Witnica, Poland

Sport
- Partner: Nikola Domowicz

Dominika Piwkowska (born 18 February 2003) is a Polish luger. She competed in the women's doubles event at 2026 Winter Olympic Games.

== Luge results ==
| Event | With | Women's Double | Run 1 | Run 2 | Total |
|---|---|---|---|---|---|
| (Italy) 2026 Milano Cortina | Nikola Domowicz | 6th | 54.247 | 53.989 | 1:48.236 |
