= FIL European Luge Championships =

International competition

The FIL European Luge Championships, part of the International Luge Federation (FIL) have taken place since 1914. From 1914 to 1934, these championships were part of the Internationaler Schlittensportsverband (ISSV - International Sled Sport Federation in (in German)). From 1935 to 1956, the championships were held under the auspices of the Fédération Internationale de Bobsleigh et de Tobogganing (FIBT - International Bobsleigh and Tobagganing Federation in (in French)). Since 1962, the event has been under the auspices of the FIL and has been held in even-numbered years since 1980. Since 2012, it is held annually within a preselected World Cup stages in the so-called race-in-race mode. The results of non-European athletes at these World Cup stages are not counted for European Championships standings.

For information on natural track luge championships in Europe, please see FIL European Luge Natural Track Championships, which have been contested since 1970.

== Host cities ==
- 1914: Reichenberg, Bohemia (part of Austria-Hungary)
- 1928: Schreiberhau, Germany
- 1929: Semmering, Austria
- 1934: Ilmenau, Germany
- 1935: Krynica, Poland
- 1937: Oslo, Norway
- 1938: Salzburg, Austria
- 1939: Reichenberg, Germany (Czechoslovakia was under Nazi Germany then)
- 1951: Innsbruck, Austria
- 1952: Garmisch-Partenkirchen, West Germany
- 1953: Cortina d'Ampezzo, Italy
- 1954: Davos, Switzerland
- 1955: Hahnenklee, West Germany
- 1956: Imst, Austria
- 1957-61: Events cancelled
- 1962: Weißenbach, Austria
- 1963-66: Events cancelled
- 1967: Königssee, West Germany
- 1968-69: Events cancelled
- 1970: Hammarstrand, Sweden
- 1971: Imst, Austria
- 1972: Königssee, West Germany
- 1973: Königssee, West Germany
- 1974: Imst, Austria
- 1975: Olang, Italy
- 1976: Hammarstrand, Sweden
- 1977: Königssee, West Germany
- 1978: Hammarstrand, Sweden
- 1979: Oberhof, East Germany
- 1980: Olang, Italy
- 1982: Winterberg, West Germany
- 1984: Olang, Italy
- 1986: Hammarstrand, Sweden
- 1988: Königssee, West Germany
- 1990: Innsbruck, Austria
- 1992: Winterberg, Germany
- 1994: Königssee, Germany
- 1996: Sigulda, Latvia
- 1998: Oberhof, Germany
- 2000: Winterberg, Germany
- 2002: Altenberg, Germany
- 2004: Oberhof, Germany
- 2006: Winterberg, Germany
- 2008: Cesana, Italy
- 2010: Sigulda, Latvia
- 2012: Paramonovo, Russia
- 2013: Oberhof, Germany
- 2014: Sigulda, Latvia
- 2015: Sochi, Russia
- 2016: Altenberg, Germany
- 2017: Königssee, Germany
- 2018: Sigulda, Latvia
- 2019: Oberhof, Germany
- 2020: Lillehammer, Norway
- 2021: Sigulda, Latvia
- 2022: St. Moritz, Switzerland
- 2023: Sigulda, Latvia
- 2024: Innsbruck, Austria
- 2025: Winterberg, Germany
- 2026: Oberhof, Germany

== Medal winners ==
Numbers in brackets denotes number of victories in corresponding disciplines. Boldface denotes record number of victories.

=== Men's singles ===
Debuted: 1914.

Season	Winner	Runner-up	Third
1914 Reichenberg	Rudolf Kauschka (AUT)	Jacob Platzer (AUT)	Richard Simm (AUT)
1928 Schreiberhau	Fritz Preissler (TCH)	Rudolf Kauschka (TCH)	Karl Wagner (GER)
1929 Semmering	Fritz Preissler (TCH)	Robert Liebig (GER)	Erich Dressler (GER)
1934 Ilmenau	Martin Tietze (GER)	Rudolf Maschke (TCH)	Alfred Posselt (TCH)
1935 Krynica	Martin Tietze (GER)	Maks Enker (POL)	Bronisław Witkowski (POL)
1937 Oslo	Martin Tietze (GER)	Vilhelm Klavenæs (NOR)	Harald Seegard (NOR)
1938 Salzburg	Martin Tietze (GER) **(4)**	Walter Kluge (GER)	Rudolf Hermann (TCH)
1939 Reichenberg	Fritz Preissler (TCH) (3)	Martin Tietze (GER)	Gustav Jezek (TCH)
1951 Igls	Paul Aste (AUT)	Wilhelm Lache (AUT)	Hermann Mayregger (AUT)
1952 Garmisch-Partenkirchen	Rudolf Maschke (FRG)	Paul Aste (AUT)	Albert Krauss (AUT)
1953 Cortina d’Ampezzo	Paul Aste (AUT)	Heinrich Isser (AUT)	Wilhelm Lache (AUT)
1954 Davos	Fritz Kienzl (AUT)	Wilhelm Lache (AUT)	Josef Strillinger (FRG)
1955 Hahnenklee	Paul Aste (AUT) (3)	Albert Krauss (FRG)	Johann Stangl (AUT)
1956 Imst	Josef Isser (AUT)	Hans Krausner (AUT)	Erich Raffl (AUT)
1962 Weissenbach	Josef Lenz (FRG)	Anton Venier (AUT)	Zdzisław Siuda (POL)
1967 Königssee	Leonhard Nagenrauft (FRG)	Fritz Nachmann (FRG)	Józef Matlak (POL)
1970 Hammarstrand	Harald Ehrig (GDR)	Wolfgang Scheidel (GDR)	Horst Hörnlein (GDR)
1971 Imst	Horst Hörnlein (GDR)	Wolfgang Scheidel (GDR)	Manfred Schmid (AUT)
1972 Königssee	Wolfram Fiedler (GDR)	Harald Ehrig (GDR)	Leonhard Nagenrauft (FRG)
1973 Königssee	Hans Rinn (GDR)	Josef Fendt (FRG)	Manfred Schmid (AUT)
1974 Imst	Hans Rinn (GDR)	Manfred Schmid (AUT)	Rudolf Schmid (AUT)
1975 Olang	Detlef Günther (GDR)	Wolfram Fiedler (GDR)	Hans Rinn (GDR)
1976 Hammarstrand	Wolfram Fiedler (GDR) (2)	Michael Gärdebäck (SWE)	Hans-Heinrich Winkler (GDR)
1977 Königssee	Anton Winkler (FRG)	Hans Rinn (GDR)	Karl Brunner (ITA)
1978 Hammarstrand	Paul Hildgartner (ITA)	Hans Rinn (GDR)	Vladimir Shitov (URS)
1979 Oberhof	Hans Rinn (GDR) (3)	Detlef Günther (GDR)	Bernhard Glass (GDR)
1980 Olang	Karl Brunner (ITA)	Paul Hildgartner (ITA)	Ernst Haspinger (ITA)
1982 Winterberg	Uwe Handrich (GDR)	Sergey Danilin (URS)	Ernst Haspinger (ITA)
1984 Olang	Paul Hildgartner (ITA) (2)	Norbert Huber (ITA)	Ernst Haspinger (ITA)
1986 Hammarstrand	Sergey Danilin (URS)	Jens Müller (GDR)	Michael Walter (GDR)
1988 Königssee	Georg Hackl (FRG)	Markus Prock (AUT)	Johannes Schettel (FRG)
1990 Igls	Georg Hackl (FRG) (2)	Markus Prock (AUT)	Jens Müller (GDR)
1992 Winterberg	René Friedl (GER)	Norbert Huber (ITA)	Georg Hackl (GER)
1994 Königssee	Markus Prock (AUT)	Georg Hackl (GER)	Armin Zöggeler (ITA)
1996 Sigulda	Jens Müller (GER)	Albert Demchenko (RUS)	Markus Schmidt (AUT)
1998 Oberhof	Markus Prock (AUT)	Karsten Albert (GER)	Norbert Huber (ITA)
2000 Winterberg	Jens Müller (GER) (2)	Georg Hackl (GER)	Armin Zöggeler (ITA)
2002 Altenberg	Markus Prock (AUT) (3)	Denis Geppert (GER)	Armin Zöggeler (ITA)
2004 Oberhof	Armin Zöggeler (ITA)	David Möller (GER)	Jaroslav Slávik (SVK)
2006 Winterberg	Albert Demchenko (RUS)	Armin Zöggeler (ITA)	David Möller (GER)
2008 Cesana	Armin Zöggeler (ITA)	Albert Demchenko (RUS)	David Möller (GER)
2010 Sigulda	Albert Demchenko (RUS) (2)	Wolfgang Kindl (AUT)	Daniel Pfister (AUT)
2012 Paramonovo	Andi Langenhan (GER)	Armin Zöggeler (ITA)	Felix Loch (GER)
2013 Oberhof	Felix Loch (GER)	Andi Langenhan (GER)	Johannes Ludwig (GER)
2014 Sigulda	Armin Zöggeler (ITA) (3)	Johannes Ludwig (GER)	Dominik Fischnaller (ITA)
2015 Sochi	Semen Pavlichenko (RUS)	Aleksander Peretyagin (RUS)	Felix Loch (GER)
2016 Altenberg	Felix Loch (GER)	Roman Repilov (RUS)	Ralf Palik (GER)
2017 Königssee	Semen Pavlichenko (RUS)	Ralf Palik (GER)	Wolfgang Kindl (AUT)
2018 Sigulda	Semen Pavlichenko (RUS)	Felix Loch (GER)	Roman Repilov (RUS)
2019 Oberhof	Semen Pavlichenko (RUS) **(4)**	Roman Repilov (RUS)	Kristers Aparjods (LAT)
2020 Lillehammer	Dominik Fischnaller (ITA)	Semen Pavlichenko (RUS)	Roman Repilov (RUS)
2021 Sigulda	Felix Loch (GER) (3)	Johannes Ludwig (GER)	Dominik Fischnaller (ITA)
2022 St. Moritz	Wolfgang Kindl (AUT)	Kristers Aparjods (LAT)	Nico Gleirscher (AUT)
2023 Sigulda	Max Langenhan (GER)	Felix Loch (GER)	Kristers Aparjods (LAT)
2024 Igls	Jonas Müller (AUT)	Nico Gleirscher (AUT)	Max Langenhan (GER)
2025 Winterberg	Jonas Müller (AUT)	Max Langenhan (GER)	Nico Gleirscher (AUT)
2026 Oberhof	Jonas Müller (AUT) (3)	Felix Loch (GER)	Max Langenhan (GER)

Medal table

Rank	Nation	Gold	Silver	Bronze	Total
1	Austria	13	12	14	39
2	Germany	12	16	11	39
3	East Germany	9	8	6	23
4	Italy	7	5	10	22
5	Russia	6	6	2	14
6	West Germany	6	3	3	12
7	Czechoslovakia	3	2	3	8
8	Soviet Union	1	1	1	3
9	Poland	0	1	3	4
10	Latvia	0	1	2	3
11	Norway	0	1	1	2
12	Sweden	0	1	0	1
13	Slovakia	0	0	1	1
Totals (13 entries)		**57**	**57**	**57**	**171**

=== Women's singles ===
Debuted: 1914 (unofficial), 1928 (official).

Season	Winner	Runner-up	Third
1914 Reichenberg	Anna Skoda (AUT)	Anna Rothe (AUT)	Resi Jahnel (AUT)
1928 Schreiberhau	Hilde Raupach (GER)	Margarete Wolff (GER)	Else Hench (AUT)
1929 Semmering	Lotte Embacher (GER)	Christa Klecker (AUT)	Fanny Altendorfer (GER)
1934 Ilmenau	Hanni Fink (TCH)	Adela Raimannová (TCH)	Gertrude Porsche-Schinkeová (TCH)
1935 Krynica	Hanni Fink (TCH) (2)	Liselotte Hopfer (GER)	Gertrude Porsche-Schinkeová (TCH)
1937 Oslo	Titti Maartmann (NOR)	Liv Jensen (NOR)	Helen Galtung (NOR)
1938 Salzburg	Friedel Tietze (GER)	Waltraut Grassl (TCH)	Hanni Finková (TCH)
1939 Reichenberg	Friedel Tietze (GER) (2)	Waltraut Grassl (TCH)	Hanni Finková (TCH)
1951 Igls	Karla Kienzl (AUT)	Hilde Strum (AUT)	Maria Isser (AUT)
1952 Garmisch-Partenkirchen	Maria Isser (AUT)	Erika Schiller (FRG)	Rosa Perz (AUT)
1953 Cortina d’Ampezzo	Maria Isser (AUT)	Liesl Seewald (AUT)	Rosa Lesser (AUT)
1954 Davos	Maria Isser (AUT)	Karla Kienzl (AUT)	Lotte Scheimpflug (ITA)
1955 Hahnenklee	Maria Isser (AUT) (4)	Karla Kienzl (AUT)	Erika Leitner (ITA)
1956 Imst	Elly Lieber (AUT)	Maria Isser (AUT)	Lotte Scheimpflug (ITA)
1962 Weissenbach	Irena Pawełczyk (POL)	Helene Thurner (AUT)	Gerda Cegner-Rieser (AUT)
1967 Königssee	Christina Schmuck (FRG)	Angelika Dünhaupt (FRG)	Helena Macher (POL)
1970 Hammarstrand	Anna-Maria Müller (GDR)	Angela Knösel (GDR)	Christina Schmuck (FRG)
1971 Imst	Erika Lechner (ITA)	Angela Knösel (GDR)	Barbara Piecha (POL)
1972 Königssee	Ute Rührold (GDR)	Elisabeth Demleitner (FRG)	Anna-Maria Müller (GDR)
1973 Königssee	Margit Schumann (GDR)	Ute Rührold (GDR)	Eva-Maria Wernicke (GDR)
1974 Imst	Margit Schumann (GDR)	Halina Kanasz (POL)	Ute Rührold (GDR)
1975 Olang	Margit Schumann (GDR) (3)	Eva-Maria Wernicke (GDR)	Halina Kanasz (POL)
1976 Hammarstrand	Vera Zozulya (URS)	Agneta Lindskog (SWE)	Halina Biegun (POL)
1977 Königssee	Elisabeth Demleitner (FRG)	Margit Schumann (GDR)	Margit Graf (AUT)
1978 Hammarstrand	Elisabeth Demleitner (FRG) (2)	Anna Mayevskaya (URS)	Vera Zozulya (URS)
1979 Oberhof	Melitta Sollmann (GDR)	Ilona Brand (GDR)	Margit Schumann (GDR)
1980 Olang	Melitta Sollmann (GDR) (2)	Marie-Luise Rainer (ITA)	Ilona Brand (GDR)
1982 Winterberg	Bettina Schmidt (GDR)	Steffi Martin (GDR)	Melitta Sollmann (GDR)
1984 Olang	Monika Auer (ITA)	Heike Popel (GDR)	Cerstin Schmidt (GDR)
1986 Hammarstrand	Cerstin Schmidt (GDR)	Steffi Martin (GDR)	Ute Oberhoffner (GDR)
1988 Königssee	Ute Oberhoffner (GDR)	Veronika Bilgeri (FRG)	Cerstin Schmidt (GDR)
1990 Igls	Susi Erdmann (GDR)	Gerda Weissensteiner (ITA)	Jana Bode (FRG)
1992 Winterberg	Susi Erdmann (GER) (2)	Sylke Otto (GER)	Angelika Neuner (AUT)
1994 Königssee	Gerda Weissensteiner (ITA)	Jana Bode (GER)	Gabriele Kohlisch (GER)
1996 Sigulda	Jana Bode (GER)	Gabriele Kohlisch (GER)	Andrea Tagwerker (AUT)
1998 Oberhof	Silke Kraushaar (GER)	Andrea Tagwerker (AUT)	Susi Erdmann (GER)
2000 Winterberg	Sylke Otto (GER)	Silke Kraushaar (GER)	Barbara Niedernhuber (GER)
2002 Altenberg	Sylke Otto (GER) (2)	Silke Kraushaar (GER)	Barbara Niedernhuber (GER)
2004 Oberhof	Silke Kraushaar (GER)	Tatjana Hüfner (GER)	Sylke Otto (GER)
2006 Winterberg	Silke Kraushaar (GER) (3)	Tatjana Hüfner (GER)	Barbara Niedernhuber (GER)
2008 Cesana	Natalie Geisenberger (GER)	Silke Kraushaar-Pielach (GER)	Veronika Halder (AUT)
2010 Sigulda	Tatiana Ivanova (RUS)	Corinna Martini (GER)	Nina Reithmayer (AUT)
2012 Paramonovo	Tatiana Ivanova (RUS)	Tatjana Hüfner (GER)	Corinna Martini (GER)
2013 Oberhof	Natalie Geisenberger (GER)	Tatjana Hüfner (GER)	Anke Wischnewski (GER)
2014 Sigulda	Natalia Khoreva (RUS)	Tatiana Ivanova (RUS)	Dajana Eitberger (GER)
2015 Sochi	Dajana Eitberger (GER)	Natalie Geisenberger (GER)	Tatiana Ivanova (RUS)
2016 Altenberg	Tatjana Hüfner (GER)	Elīza Cauce (LAT)	Tatiana Ivanova (RUS)
2017 Königssee	Natalie Geisenberger (GER)	Tatiana Ivanova (RUS)	Tatjana Hüfner (GER)
2018 Sigulda	Tatiana Ivanova (RUS)	Natalie Geisenberger (GER)	Sandra Robatscher (ITA)
2019 Oberhof	Natalie Geisenberger (GER)	Tatjana Hüfner (GER)	Dajana Eitberger (GER)
2020 Lillehammer	Tatiana Ivanova (RUS)	Julia Taubitz (GER)	Victoria Demchenko (RUS)
2021 Sigulda	Tatiana Ivanova (RUS) **(5)**	Natalie Geisenberger (GER)	Victoria Demchenko (RUS)
2022 St. Moritz	Natalie Geisenberger (GER) **(5)**	Madeleine Egle (AUT)	Elīna Ieva Vītola (LAT)
2023 Sigulda	Anna Berreiter (GER)	Dajana Eitberger (GER)	Elīna Ieva Vītola (LAT)
2024 Igls	Madeleine Egle (AUT)	Julia Taubitz (GER)	Anna Berreiter (GER)
2025 Winterberg	Julia Taubitz (GER)	Madeleine Egle (AUT)	Lisa Schulte (AUT)
2026 Oberhof	Merle Fräbel (GER)	Lisa Schulte (AUT)	Natalie Maag (SUI)

Medal table

Rank	Nation	Gold	Silver	Bronze	Total
1	Germany	21	20	13	54
2	East Germany	11	9	9	29
3	Austria	8	12	11	31
4	Russia	6	2	4	12
5	West Germany	3	4	3	10
6	Italy	3	2	4	9
7	Czechoslovakia	2	3	4	9
8	Poland	1	1	4	6
9	Norway	1	1	1	3
9	Soviet Union	1	1	1	3
11	Latvia	0	1	2	3
12	Sweden	0	1	0	1
13	Switzerland	0	0	1	1
Totals (13 entries)		**57**	**57**	**57**	**171**

European Championships 1914 (not recognized by the FIL) included

=== Men's doubles ===
Debuted: 1914 as open event to men and women. Changed to men's doubles: 2023.

Season	Winner	Runner-up	Third
1914 Reichenberg	Erwin Posselt; Karl Löbelt; Austria	Rudolf Kauschka (AUT); Hans Gfäller (GER)	Arthur Klamt; Bertold Posselt; Austria
1928 Schreiberhau	Herbert Elger; Wilhelm Adolf; Germany	Richard Feist; Walter Feist; Germany	Alfred Posselt; Fritz Posselt; Czechoslovakia
1929 Semmering	Richard Feist; Walter Feist; Germany	Rudolf Kauschka; Fritz Preissler; Czechoslovakia	Franz Stecker; Ferdinand Wiesner; Austria
1934 Ilmenau	Walter Feist; Walter Kluge; Germany	Rudolf Hermann; Rudolf Maschke; Czechoslovakia	Josef Heller; Albert Krauss; Czechoslovakia
1935 Krynica	Walter Feist; Walter Kluge; Germany	Martin Tietze; Kurt Weidner; Germany	Hans Taubner; Hans Schöler; Czechoslovakia
1937 Oslo	Martin Tietze; Kurt Weidner; Germany	Walter Feist; Walter Kluge; Germany	Rudolf Maschke; Albert Krauss; Czechoslovakia
1938 Salzburg	Walter Feist; Walter Kluge; Germany	Viktor Schubert; Werner Rüger; Germany	Rudolf Maschke; Erhard Grundmann; Czechoslovakia
1939 Reichenberg	Walter Feist (5); Walter Kluge (4); Germany	Viktor Schubert; Erhard Körner; Germany	Rudolf Hermann; Albert Krauss; Czechoslovakia
1951 Igls	Hans Krausner; Rudolf Peyfuss; Austria	Heinrich Isser; Josef Isser; Austria	Norbert Steixner; Adolf Hofer; Austria
1952 Garmisch-Partenkirchen	Paul Aste; Heinrich Isser; Austria	Hans Krausner; Luis Schlögl; Austria	Wilhelm Lache; Josef Isser; Austria
1953 Cortina d’Ampezzo	Hans Krausner (2); Wilhelm Lache; Austria	Paul Aste; Heinrich Isser; Austria	Erich Raffl; Stefan Schöpf; Austria
1954 Davos	Josef Isser; Maria Isser; Austria	Ernst Feistmantl; Richard Feistmantl; Austria	Hans Krausner; Josef Leistentritt; Austria
1955 Hahnenklee	Paul Aste (2); Heinrich Isser (2); Austria	Hermann Küppel; Dietrich Schmidt; West Germany	Hermann Mayr; Erhard Grundmann; West Germany
1956 Imst	Wilhelm Leimgruber; Josef Unterfrauner; Austria	Erich Raffl; Stefan Schöpf; Austria	Josef Thaler; Luis Posch; Austria
1962 Weissenbach	Anton Venier; Ewald Walch; Austria	Josef Feistmantl; Manfred Stengl; Austria	Reinhold Frosch; Ludwig Gassner; Austria
1967 Königssee	Josef Feistmantl; Wilhelm Bichl; Austria	Helmut Thaler; Reinhold Senn; Austria	Ryszard Gawior; Zbigniew Gawior; Poland
1970 Hammarstrand	Horst Hörnlein; Reinhard Bredow; East Germany	Rudolf Schmid; Franz Schachner; Austria	Manfred Schmid; Ewald Walch; Austria
1971 Imst	Paul Hildgartner; Walter Plaikner; Italy	Manfred Schmid; Ewald Walch; Austria	Tadeusz Radwan; Janusz Krawczyk; Poland
1972 Königssee	Horst Hörnlein (2); Reinhard Bredow (2); East Germany	Hans Brandner; Balthasar Schwarm; West Germany	Peter Reichnwallner; Rudolf Größwang; West Germany
1973 Königssee	Hans Rinn; Norbert Hahn; East Germany	Bernd Hahn; Ulrich Hahn; East Germany	Hans Brandner; Balthasar Schwarm; West Germany
1974 Imst	Paul Hildgartner (2); Walter Plaikner (2); Italy	Hans Rinn; Norbert Hahn; East Germany	Roman Hurej; Józef Pietrończyk; Poland
1975 Olang	Hans Rinn; Norbert Hahn; East Germany	Horst Müller; Hans-Jörg Neumann; East Germany	Bernd Hahn; Ulrich Hahn; East Germany
1976 Hammarstrand	Bernd Dreyer; Roland Herdmann; East Germany	Asle Strand; Helge Svensen; Norway	Dainis Bremze; Aigars Kriķis; Soviet Union
1977 Königssee	Hans Brandner; Balthasar Schwarm; West Germany	Hans Rinn; Norbert Hahn; East Germany	Stefan Hölzlwimmer; Rudolf Größwang; West Germany
1978 Hammarstrand	Hans Rinn; Norbert Hahn; East Germany	Bernd Hahn; Ulrich Hahn; East Germany	Jindřich Zeman; Vladimír Resl; Czechoslovakia
1979 Oberhof	Bernd Oberhoffner; Jörg-Dieter Ludwig; East Germany	Hans Rinn; Norbert Hahn; East Germany	Karl Brunner; Peter Gschnitzer; Italy
1980 Olang	Hans Rinn (4); Norbert Hahn (4); East Germany	Bernd Hahn; Ulrich Hahn; East Germany	Hans Brandner; Balthasar Schwarm; West Germany
1982 Winterberg	Günther Lemmerer; Reinhold Sulzbacher; Austria	Hans Rinn; Jörg-Dieter Ludwig; East Germany	Hans Stangassinger; Franz Wembacher; West Germany
1984 Olang	Helmut Brunner; Walter Brunner; Italy	Hans Stangassinger; Franz Wembacher; West Germany	Hansjörg Raffl; Norbert Huber; Italy
1986 Hammarstrand	Yevgeny Belousov; Aleksandr Belyakov; Soviet Union	Jörg Hoffmann; Jochen Pietzsch; East Germany	Hansjörg Raffl; Norbert Huber; Italy
1988 Königssee	Thomas Schwab; Wolfgang Staudinger; West Germany	Hansjörg Raffl; Norbert Huber; Italy	Yevgeny Belousov; Aleksandr Belyakov; Soviet Union
1990 Igls	Jörg Hoffmann; Jochen Pietzsch; East Germany	Hansjörg Raffl; Norbert Huber; Italy	Stefan Krauße; Jan Behrendt; East Germany
1992 Winterberg	Hansjörg Raffl; Norbert Huber; Italy	Kurt Brugger; Wilfried Huber; Italy	Stefan Krauße; Jan Behrendt; Germany
1994 Königssee	Hansjörg Raffl (2); Norbert Huber (2); Italy	Kurt Brugger; Wilfried Huber; Italy	Yves Mankel; Thomas Rudolph; Germany
1996 Sigulda	Stefan Krauße; Jan Behrendt; Germany	Gerhard Plankensteiner; Oswald Haselrieder; Italy	Albert Demchenko; Semen Kolobayev; Russia
1998 Oberhof	Stefan Krauße (2); Jan Behrendt (2); Germany	Steffen Skel; Steffen Wöller; Germany	Tobias Schiegl; Markus Schiegl; Austria
2000 Winterberg	Patric Leitner; Alexander Resch; Germany	Steffen Skel; Steffen Wöller; Germany	Tobias Schiegl; Markus Schiegl; Austria
2002 Altenberg	Patric Leitner; Alexander Resch; Germany	Tobias Schiegl; Markus Schiegl; Austria	Gerhard Plankensteiner; Oswald Haselrieder; Italy
2004 Oberhof	Steffen Skel; Steffen Wöller; Germany	Christian Oberstolz; Patrick Gruber; Italy	Andreas Linger; Wolfgang Linger; Austria
2006 Winterberg	Patric Leitner (3); Alexander Resch (3); Germany	Sebastian Schmidt; André Forker; Germany	Christian Oberstolz; Patrick Gruber; Italy
2008 Cesana	Christian Oberstolz; Patrick Gruber; Italy	Andreas Linger; Wolfgang Linger; Austria	Patric Leitner; Alexander Resch; Germany
2008 Cesana	Christian Oberstolz; Patrick Gruber; Italy	Andreas Linger; Wolfgang Linger; Austria	Gerhard Plankensteiner; Oswald Haselrieder; Italy
2010 Sigulda	Andreas Linger; Wolfgang Linger; Austria	Tobias Wendl; Tobias Arlt; Germany	Tobias Schiegl; Markus Schiegl; Austria
2012 Paramonovo	Peter Penz; Georg Fischler; Austria	Tobias Wendl; Tobias Arlt; Germany	Toni Eggert; Sascha Benecken; Germany
2013 Oberhof	Toni Eggert; Sascha Benecken; Germany	Tobias Wendl; Tobias Arlt; Germany	Peter Penz; Georg Fischler; Austria
2014 Sigulda	Christian Oberstolz (2); Patrick Gruber (2); Italy	Vladislav Yuzhakov; Vladimir Makhnutin; Russia	Andreas Linger; Wolfgang Linger; Austria
2015 Sochi	Tobias Wendl; Tobias Arlt; Germany	Peter Penz; Georg Fischler; Austria	Andris Šics; Juris Šics; Latvia
2016 Altenberg	Toni Eggert; Sascha Benecken; Germany	Tobias Wendl; Tobias Arlt; Germany	Peter Penz; Georg Fischler; Austria
2017 Königssee	Tobias Wendl; Tobias Arlt; Germany	Toni Eggert; Sascha Benecken; Germany	Robin Johannes Geueke; David Gamm; Germany
2018 Sigulda	Toni Eggert; Sascha Benecken; Germany	Andris Šics; Juris Šics; Latvia	Tobias Wendl; Tobias Arlt; Germany
2019 Oberhof	Tobias Wendl; Tobias Arlt; Germany	Toni Eggert; Sascha Benecken; Germany	Andris Šics; Juris Šics; Latvia
2020 Lillehammer	Alexander Denisyev; Vladislav Antonov; Russia	Thomas Steu; Lorenz Koller; Austria	Vladislav Yuzhakov; Yuri Prokhorov; Russia
2021 Sigulda	Andris Šics; Juris Šics; Latvia	Tobias Wendl; Tobias Arlt; Germany	Mārtiņš Bots; Roberts Plūme; Latvia
2022 St. Moritz	Toni Eggert (4); Sascha Benecken (4); Germany	Tobias Wendl; Tobias Arlt; Germany	Mārtiņš Bots; Roberts Plūme; Latvia
2023 Sigulda	Tobias Wendl; Tobias Arlt; Germany	Mārtiņš Bots; Roberts Plūme; Latvia	Eduards Ševics-Mikeļševics; Lūkass Krasts; Latvia
2024 Igls	Thomas Steu; Wolfgang Kindl; Austria	Mārtiņš Bots; Roberts Plūme; Latvia	Tobias Wendl; Tobias Arlt; Germany
2025 Winterberg	Tobias Wendl; Tobias Arlt; Germany	Juri Gatt; Riccardo Schöpf; Austria	Yannick Müller; Armin Frauscher; Austria
2026 Oberhof	Tobias Wendl **(6)**; Tobias Arlt **(6)**; Germany	Toni Eggert; Florian Müller; Germany	Juri Gatt; Riccardo Schöpf; Austria

Medal table

Rank	Nation	Gold	Silver	Bronze	Total
1	Germany	23	17.5	7	47.5
2	Austria	13	14.5	18	45.5
3	East Germany	9	9	2	20
4	Italy	7	6	6	19
5	West Germany	2	3	6	11
6	Latvia	1	3	5	9
7	Russia	1	1	2	4
8	Soviet Union	1	0	2	3
9	Czechoslovakia	0	2	7	9
10	Norway	0	1	0	1
11	Poland	0	0	3	3
Totals (11 entries)		**57**	**57**	**58**	**172**

=== Women's doubles ===
Debuted: 2023.

Season	Winner	Runner-up	Third
2023 Sigulda	Andrea Vötter; Marion Oberhofer; Italy	Anda Upīte; Sanija Ozoliņa; Latvia	Jessica Degenhardt; Cheyenne Rosenthal; Germany
2024 Igls	Jessica Degenhardt; Cheyenne Rosenthal; Germany	Andrea Vötter; Marion Oberhofer; Italy	Marta Robežniece; Kitija Bogdanova; Latvia
2025 Winterberg	Selina Egle; Lara Kipp; Austria	Jessica Degenhardt; Cheyenne Rosenthal; Germany	Andrea Vötter; Marion Oberhofer; Italy
2026 Oberhof	Jessica Degenhardt **(2)**; Cheyenne Rosenthal **(2)**; Germany	Selina Egle; Lara Kipp; Austria	Dajana Eitberger; Magdalena Matschina; Germany

Medal table

Rank	Nation	Gold	Silver	Bronze	Total
1	Germany	2	1	2	5
2	Italy	1	1	1	3
3	Austria	1	1	0	2
4	Latvia	0	1	1	2
Totals (4 entries)		**4**	**4**	**4**	**12**

=== Mixed team ===
Debuted: 1988 as five sleds (up to six members) per mixed team. Changed to three sleds (up to four members) per mixed team: 2000.
Changed to relay format – three sleds (four members) per mixed team: 2008. Changed to four sleds (six members) per mixed relay team: 2024.

Season	Winner	Runner-up	Third
1988 Königssee	Georg Hackl; Johannes Schettel; Kerstin Langkopf; Veronika Bilgeri; Thomas Schwab; Wolfgang Staudinger; West Germany	Michael Walter; Jens Müller; Cerstin Schmidt; Ute Oberhoffner; Marco Ernst; Olaf Paschold; East Germany	Norbert Huber; Paul Hildgartner; Marie-Luise Rainer; Gerda Weissensteiner; Hansjörg Raffl; Italy
1990 Igls	Jens Müller; René Friedl; Susi Erdmann; Sylke Otto; Jörg Hoffmann; Jochen Pietzsch; East Germany	Georg Hackl; Johannes Schettel; Jana Bode; Margit Paar; Stefan Ilsanker; West Germany	Arnold Huber; Norbert Huber; Gerda Weissensteiner; Natalie Obkircher; Hansjörg Raffl; Italy
1992 Winterberg	Georg Hackl; René Friedl (2); Susi Erdmann; Sylke Otto; Yves Mankel; Thomas Rudolph; Germany	Markus Prock; Robert Manzenreiter; Angelika Neuner; Andrea Tagwerker; Gerhard Gleirscher; Markus Schmidt; Austria	Norbert Huber; Oswald Haselrieder; Natalie Obkircher; Anja Plaikner; Hansjörg Raffl; Italy
1994 Königssee	Armin Zöggeler; Norbert Huber; Gerda Weissensteiner; Natalie Obkircher; Kurt Brugger; Wilfried Huber; Italy	Georg Hackl; René Friedl; Jana Bode; Gabriele Kohlisch; Yves Mankel; Thomas Rudolph; Germany	Markus Prock; Markus Schmidt; Doris Neuner; Andrea Tagwerker; Tobias Schiegl; Markus Schiegl; Austria
1996 Sigulda	Jens Müller; Georg Hackl; Jana Bode; Susi Erdmann; Stefan Krauße; Jan Behrendt; Germany	Markus Prock; Markus Schmidt; Angelika Neuner; Andrea Tagwerker; Tobias Schiegl; Markus Schiegl; Austria	Armin Zöggeler; Wilfried Huber; Gerda Weissensteiner; Natalie Obkircher; Gerhard Plankensteiner; Oswald Haselrieder; Italy
1998 Oberhof	Jens Müller (3); Karsten Albert; Susi Erdmann (4); Silke Kraushaar; Stefan Krauße (2); Jan Behrendt (2); Germany	Armin Zöggeler; Norbert Huber; Natalie Obkircher; Gerda Weissensteiner; Kurt Brugger; Wilfried Huber; Italy	Markus Prock; Markus Kleinheinz; Angelika Neuner; Andrea Tagwerker; Tobias Schiegl; Markus Schiegl; Austria
2000 Winterberg	Georg Hackl; Sylke Otto (3); Patric Leitner; Alexander Resch; Germany	Karsten Albert; Sonja Wiedemann; Steffen Skel; Steffen Wöller; Germany	Armin Zöggeler; Natalie Obkircher; Gerhard Plankensteiner; Oswald Haselrieder; Italy
2002 Altenberg	Georg Hackl **(5)**; Silke Kraushaar; Steffen Skel; Steffen Wöller; Germany	Denis Geppert; Sylke Otto; Patric Leitner; Alexander Resch; Germany	Markus Prock; Angelika Neuner; Tobias Schiegl; Markus Schiegl; Austria
2004 Oberhof	Jan Eichhorn; Silke Kraushaar; Steffen Skel (2); Steffen Wöller (2); Germany	Armin Zöggeler; Anastasia Oberstolz-Antonova; Christian Oberstolz; Patrick Gruber; Italy	Martin Abentung; Veronika Halder; Andreas Linger; Wolfgang Linger; Austria
2006 Winterberg	David Möller; Silke Kraushaar (4); Patric Leitner (2); Alexander Resch (2); Germany	Armin Zöggeler; Anastasia Oberstolz-Antonova; Christian Oberstolz; Patrick Gruber; Italy	Mārtiņš Rubenis; Anna Orlova; Juris Šics; Andris Šics; Latvia
2008 Cesana	Mārtiņš Rubenis; Maija Tīruma; Juris Šics; Andris Šics; Latvia	Martin Abentung; Veronika Halder; Andreas Linger; Wolfgang Linger; Austria	Armin Zöggeler; Sandra Gasparini; Gerhard Plankensteiner; Oswald Haselrieder; Italy
2010 Sigulda	Anna Orlova; Mārtiņš Rubenis (2); Juris Šics (2); Andris Šics (2); Latvia	Veronika Halder; Wolfgang Kindl; Andreas Linger; Wolfgang Linger; Austria	Corinna Martini; Johannes Ludwig; Tobias Wendl; Tobias Arlt; Germany
2012 Paramonovo	Tatiana Ivanova; Albert Demchenko; Vladislav Yuzhakov; Vladimir Makhnutin; Russia	Tatjana Hüfner; Andi Langenhan; Tobias Wendl; Tobias Arlt; Germany	Sandra Gasparini; Armin Zöggeler; Christian Oberstolz; Patrick Gruber; Italy
2013 Oberhof	Natalie Geisenberger; Felix Loch; Toni Eggert; Sascha Benecken; Germany	Sandra Gasparini; Armin Zöggeler; Christian Oberstolz; Patrick Gruber; Italy	Tatiana Ivanova; Albert Demchenko; Vladislav Yuzhakov; Vladimir Makhnutin; Russia
2014 Sigulda	Natalia Khoreva; Albert Demchenko (2); Vladislav Yuzhakov (2); Vladimir Makhnutin (2); Russia	Elīza Tīruma; Mārtiņš Rubenis; Andris Šics; Juris Šics; Latvia	Sandra Gasparini; Armin Zöggeler; Christian Oberstolz; Patrick Gruber; Italy
2015 Sochi	Dajana Eitberger; Felix Loch; Tobias Wendl; Tobias Arlt; Germany	Tatiana Ivanova; Semen Pavlichenko; Alexander Denisyev; Vladislav Antonov; Russia	Elīza Tīruma; Inārs Kivlenieks; Andris Šics; Juris Šics; Latvia
2016 Altenberg	Tatjana Hüfner; Felix Loch; Toni Eggert (2); Sascha Benecken (2); Germany	Elīza Cauce; Artūrs Dārznieks; Andris Šics; Juris Šics; Latvia	Tatiana Ivanova; Roman Repilov; Alexander Denisyev; Vladislav Antonov; Russia
2017 Königssee	Natalie Geisenberger (2); Ralf Palik; Tobias Wendl; Tobias Arlt; Germany	Miriam Kastlunger; Wolfgang Kindl; Thomas Steu; Lorenz Koller; Austria	Elīza Cauce; Artūrs Dārznieks; Andris Šics; Juris Šics; Latvia
2018 Sigulda	Tatiana Ivanova; Semen Pavlichenko; Alexander Denisyev; Vladislav Antonov; Russia	Natalie Geisenberger; Felix Loch; Toni Eggert; Sascha Benecken; Germany	Kendija Aparjode; Inārs Kivlenieks; Andris Šics; Juris Šics; Latvia
2019 Oberhof	Andrea Vötter; Dominik Fischnaller; Ivan Nagler; Fabian Malleier; Italy	Natalie Geisenberger; Johannes Ludwig; Tobias Wendl; Tobias Arlt; Germany	Elīza Cauce; Inārs Kivlenieks; Andris Šics; Juris Šics; Latvia
2020 Lillehammer	Madeleine Egle; David Gleirscher; Thomas Steu; Lorenz Koller; Austria	Andrea Vötter; Dominik Fischnaller; Ivan Nagler; Fabian Malleier; Italy	Ulla Zirne; Kristers Aparjods; Andris Šics; Juris Šics; Latvia
2021 Sigulda	Tatiana Ivanova (3); Semen Pavlichenko (2); Vsevolod Kashkin; Konstantin Korshunov; Russia	Elīza Tīruma; Artūrs Dārznieks; Andris Šics; Juris Šics; Latvia	Natalie Geisenberger; Felix Loch; Tobias Wendl; Tobias Arlt; Germany
2022 St. Moritz	Elīna Ieva Vītola; Kristers Aparjods; Mārtiņš Bots; Roberts Plūme; Latvia	Natalie Geisenberger; Johannes Ludwig; Toni Eggert; Sascha Benecken; Germany	Tatiana Ivanova; Roman Repilov; Andrey Bogdanov; Yuri Prokhorov; Russia
2023 Sigulda	Elīna Ieva Vītola (2); Kristers Aparjods (2); Mārtiņš Bots (2); Roberts Plūme (2); Latvia	Anna Berreiter; Max Langenhan; Tobias Wendl; Tobias Arlt; Germany	Sandra Robatscher; Dominik Fischnaller; Emanuel Rieder; Simon Kainzwaldner; Italy
2024 Igls	Madeleine Egle; Thomas Steu (2); Wolfgang Kindl; Jonas Müller; Selina Egle; Lara Kipp; Austria	Julia Taubitz; Tobias Wendl; Tobias Arlt; Max Langenhan; Jessica Degenhardt; Cheyenne Rosenthal; Germany	Verena Hofer; Emanuel Rieder; Simon Kainzwaldner; Dominik Fischnaller; Andrea Vötter; Marion Oberhofer; Italy
2025 Winterberg	Madeleine Egle (3); Juri Gatt; Riccardo Schöpf; Jonas Müller (2); Selina Egle (2); Lara Kipp (2); Austria	Julia Taubitz; Tobias Wendl; Tobias Arlt; Max Langenhan; Jessica Degenhardt; Cheyenne Rosenthal; Germany	Verena Hofer; Ivan Nagler; Fabian Malleier; Dominik Fischnaller; Andrea Vötter; Marion Oberhofer; Italy
2026 Oberhof	Merle Fräbel; Tobias Wendl (3); Tobias Arlt (3); Felix Loch (4); Dajana Eitberger (2); Magdalena Matschina; Germany	Lisa Schulte; Juri Gatt; Riccardo Schöpf; Jonas Müller; Selina Egle; Lara Kipp; Austria	Elīna Ieva Bota; Mārtiņš Bots; Roberts Plūme; Kristers Aparjods; Anda Upīte; Madara Pavlova; Latvia

Medal table

Rank	Nation	Gold	Silver	Bronze	Total
1	Germany	12	10	2	24
2	Latvia	4	3	7	14
3	Russia	4	1	3	8
4	Austria	3	6	4	13
5	Italy	2	5	11	18
6	East Germany	1	1	0	2
6	West Germany	1	1	0	2
Totals (7 entries)		**27**	**27**	**27**	**81**

=== Mixed singles ===
Debuted: 2026 as two sleds (two members) per mixed relay team.

Season	Winner	Runner-up	Third
2026 Oberhof	Max Langenhan; Julia Taubitz; Germany	Felix Loch; Merle Fräbel; Germany	Jonas Müller; Lisa Schulte; Austria

Medal table

Rank	Nation	Gold	Silver	Bronze	Total
1	Germany	1	1	0	2
2	Austria	0	0	1	1
Totals (2 entries)		**1**	**1**	**1**	**3**

=== Mixed doubles ===
Debuted: 2026 as two sleds (four members) per mixed relay team.

Season	Winner	Runner-up	Third
2026 Oberhof	Thomas Steu; Wolfgang Kindl; Selina Egle; Lara Kipp; Austria	Toni Eggert; Florian Müller; Jessica Degenhardt; Cheyenne Rosenthal; Germany	Mārtiņš Bots; Roberts Plūme; Marta Robežniece; Kitija Bogdanova; Latvia

Medal table

Rank	Nation	Gold	Silver	Bronze	Total
1	Austria	1	0	0	1
2	Germany	0	1	0	1
3	Latvia	0	0	1	1
Totals (3 entries)		**1**	**1**	**1**	**3**

== Medal table ==
Updated after the 2026 FIL European Luge Championships.

Rank	Nation	Gold	Silver	Bronze	Total
1	Germany	71	66.5	35	172.5
2	Austria	39	45.5	48	132.5
3	East Germany	30	27	17	74
4	Italy	20	19	32	71
5	Russia	17	10	11	38
6	West Germany	12	11	12	35
7	Latvia	5	9	18	32
8	Czechoslovakia	5	7	14	26
9	Soviet Union	3	2	4	9
10	Norway	1	3	2	6
11	Poland	1	2	10	13
12	Sweden	0	2	0	2
13	Slovakia	0	0	1	1
13	Switzerland	0	0	1	1
Totals (14 entries)		204	204	205	613

== Multiple medalists ==
Boldface denotes active lugers and highest medal count among all lugers (including these who not included in these tables) per type.

=== Men ===
Rank	Luger	Country	From	To	Gold	Silver	Bronze	Total
1	**Tobias Arlt**	Germany	2010	2026	**9**	**11**	4	**24**
1	**Tobias Wendl**	Germany	2010	2026	**9**	**11**	4	**24**
3	Hans Rinn	East Germany	1973	1982	7	6	1	14
4	**Felix Loch**	Germany	2012	2026	7	5	3	15
5	Georg Hackl	West Germany; Germany	1988	2002	7	4	1	12
6	**Toni Eggert**	Germany	2012	2026	6	6	1	13
7	Sascha Benecken	Germany	2012	2022	6	4	1	11
8	**Semen Pavlichenko**	Russia	2015	2021	6	2	–	8
9	Jens Müller	East Germany; Germany	1986	2000	5	2	1	8
10	Paul Aste	Austria	1951	1955	5	2	–	7
10	Walter Feist	Germany	1928	1939	5	2	–	7
10	Martin Tietze	Germany	1934	1939	5	2	–	7

=== Women ===
Rank	Luger	Country	From	To	Gold	Silver	Bronze	Total
1	**Tatiana Ivanova**	Russia	2010	2022	**8**	3	**5**	**16**
2	Natalie Geisenberger	Germany	2008	2022	7	**6**	1	14
3	Silke Kraushaar-Pielach	Germany	1998	2008	7	3	–	10
4	Susi Erdmann	East Germany; Germany	1990	1998	6	–	1	7
5	Sylke Otto	East Germany; Germany	1990	2004	5	2	1	8
6	Maria Isser	Austria	1951	1956	5	1	1	7
7	**Madeleine Egle**	Austria	2020	2025	4	2	–	6
7	**Selina Egle**	Austria	2024	2026	4	2	–	6
7	**Lara Kipp**	Austria	2024	2026	4	2	–	6
10	**Dajana Eitberger**	Germany	2014	2026	3	1	3	7
