= FIL European Luge Championships 2008 =

The FIL European Luge Championships 2008 took place January 7-13, 2008 at the Cesana Pariol track in Cesana, Italy. The relay competition took the place of the team event that had been held at every European championship since 1988. This event had all teams start at the same part of the track (located at the women's singles/ men's doubles start house), then run down to the finish and tap on a relay marker to exchange from one slider on a team to the next (men's doubles to women's singles to men's singles) with the fastest time winning.

== Time table ==
- Practice dates for the events took place January 7-11 with event draws taking place on the 11th.
- Opening ceremonies took place at 6 PM CET (17:00 UTC) on January 10.
- To avoid direct sunlight, the events were conducted in the early morning both days.

== Competitors ==
80 competitors from 15 nations competed at these championships. This included ten relay teams which took place on the 13th.

== Men's singles ==
January 13, 2008 at 8 AM CET (07:00 UTC)

| Medal | Athlete | Time |
|---|---|---|
| Gold | Armin Zöggeler (ITA) | 1:44.341 |
| Silver | Albert Demtschenko (RUS) | + 0.341 |
| Bronze | David Möller (GER) | + 0.403 |
| 4th | Daniel Pfister (AUT) | + 0.428 |
| 5th | Martin Abentung (AUT) | + 0.474 |
| 6th | Felix Loch (GER) | + 0.509 |
| 7th | Stefan Höhener (SUI) | + 0.556 |
| 8th | Wilfried Huber (ITA) | + 0.806 |
| 9th | Jan Eichhorn (GER) | + 0.808 |
| 10th | Manuel Pfister (AUT) | + 0.876 |

This was Zöggeler's second European championship in this event and fifth straight medal at the championships.

== Women's singles ==
January 12, 2008 at 9 AM CET (08:00 UTC)

| Medal | Athlete | Time |
|---|---|---|
| Gold | Natalie Geisenberger (GER) | 1:35.364 |
| Silver | Silke Kraushaar-Pielach (GER) | +0.160 |
| Bronze | Veronika Halder (AUT) | +0.167 |
| 4th | Tatjana Hüfner (GER) | + 0.176 |
| 5th | Nina Reithmayer (AUT) | + 0.320 |
| 6th | Anke Wischnewski (GER) | + 0.412 |
| 7th | Maija Tīruma (LAT) | + 0.735 |
| 8th | Anna Orlova (LAT) | + 0.779 |
| 9th | Liliya Ludan (UKR) | + 1.019 |
| 10th | Alexandra Rodionova (RUS) | + 1.037 |

Geisenberger won her first ever championship. The event was delayed one hour to heavy snowfall in the area. Hadler is the first non-German to medal in this event at the Winter Olympic, world, or European level since fellow Austrian Angelika Neuner won a bronze at the 1998 Winter Olympics.

== Men's doubles ==
January 12, 2008 at 3 PM CET (14:00 UTC)

| Medal | Athlete | Time |
|---|---|---|
| Gold | Italy (Christian Oberstolz, Patrick Gruber) | 1:33.779 |
| Silver | Austria (Andreas Linger, Wolfgang Linger) | +0.159 |
| Bronze | Italy (Gerhard Plankensteiner, Oswald Haselrieder) | +0.183 |
| Bronze | Germany (Patric Leitner, Alexander Resch) | +0.183 |
| 5th | Germany (André Florschütz, Torsten Wustlich) | +0.408 |
| 6th | Austria (Peter Penz, Georg Fischler) | +0.591 |
| 7th | Latvia (Andris Šics, Juris Šics) | +0.638 |
| 8th | Russia (Mihail Kuzmitch, Stanislav Mikheev) | +0.896 |
| 9th | Germany (Marcel Lorenz, Christian Baude) | +1.151 |
| 10th | Russia (Ivan Nevmerzhitski, Vladimir Prokhorov) | +1.174 |

The tie for the bronze was the first in a Winter Olympic, world championship, or European championship event since they started timing luge in the 1/1000ths of a second following the tie between Italy and East Germany in the men's doubles event at the 1972 Winter Olympics in Sapporo. Oberstolz and Gruber won their first ever title, ending Leitner and Resch's four-time championships reign in this event.

== Mixed team relay ==
January 13, 2008 at 12 PM CET (11:00 UTC)

| Medal | Athlete | Time |
|---|---|---|
| Gold | Latvia (Mārtiņš Rubenis, Maija Tīruma, Andris Šics, Juris Šics) | 2:40.863 |
| Silver | Austria (Martin Abentung, Veronika Halder, Andreas Linger, Wolfgang Linger) | + 0.008 |
| Bronze | Italy (Armin Zöggeler, Sandra Gasparini, Gerhard Plankensteiner, Oswald Haselrieder) | + 0.050 |

For the first time since the event debuted at the 1988 championships, Germany did not medal, finishing fourth.

== Medal table ==
| Rank | Nation | Gold | Silver | Bronze | Total |
|---|---|---|---|---|---|
| 1 | Italy (ITA) | 2 | 0 | 2 | 4 |
| 2 | Germany (GER) | 1 | 1 | 2 | 4 |
| 3 | Latvia (LAT) | 1 | 0 | 0 | 1 |
| 4 | Austria (AUT) | 0 | 2 | 1 | 3 |
| 5 | Russia (RUS) | 0 | 1 | 0 | 1 |
| Totals (5 entries) | | 4 | 4 | 5 | 13 |
