= Dietrich Schmidt =

Dietrich Schmidt may refer to:

- Dietrich Schmidt (luger), West German luger
- Dietrich Schmidt (pilot) (1919–2002), German Luftwaffe night fighter ace
