= FIL European Luge Championships 1955 =

The FIL European Luge Championships 1955 took place in Hahnenklee, West Germany under the auspices of the Fédération Internationale de Bobsleigh et de Tobogganing (FIBT - International Bobsleigh and Tobogganing Federation in (in French)) under their "Section de Luge", a trend that would continue until the International Luge Federation (FIL) was formed in 1957.

== Men's singles ==
Medal	Athlete	Time
Gold	Paul Aste (AUT)	
Silver	Albert Krauss (FRG)	
Bronze	Johann Stangl (AUT)	

== Women's singles ==
Medal	Athlete	Time
Gold	Maria Isser (AUT)	
Silver	Karla Kienzl (AUT)	
Bronze	Erika Leitner (ITA)	

Isser won her fourth straight European championship at this event.

== Men's doubles ==
Medal	Athlete	Time
Gold	Austria (Paul Aste, Heinrich Isser)	
Silver	West Germany (Hermann Küppel, Dietrich Schmidt)	
Bronze	West Germany (Hermann Mayr, Erhard Grundmann)	

Prior to World War II, Grundmann competed for Czechoslovakia, winning a bronze in this event in 1938.

== Medal table ==
Rank	Nation	Gold	Silver	Bronze	Total
1	Austria (AUT)	3	1	1	5
2	West Germany (FRG)	0	2	1	3
3	Italy (ITA)	0	0	1	1
Totals (3 entries)		3	3	3	9
