= Tatiana Ivanova =

Russian luger (born 1991)

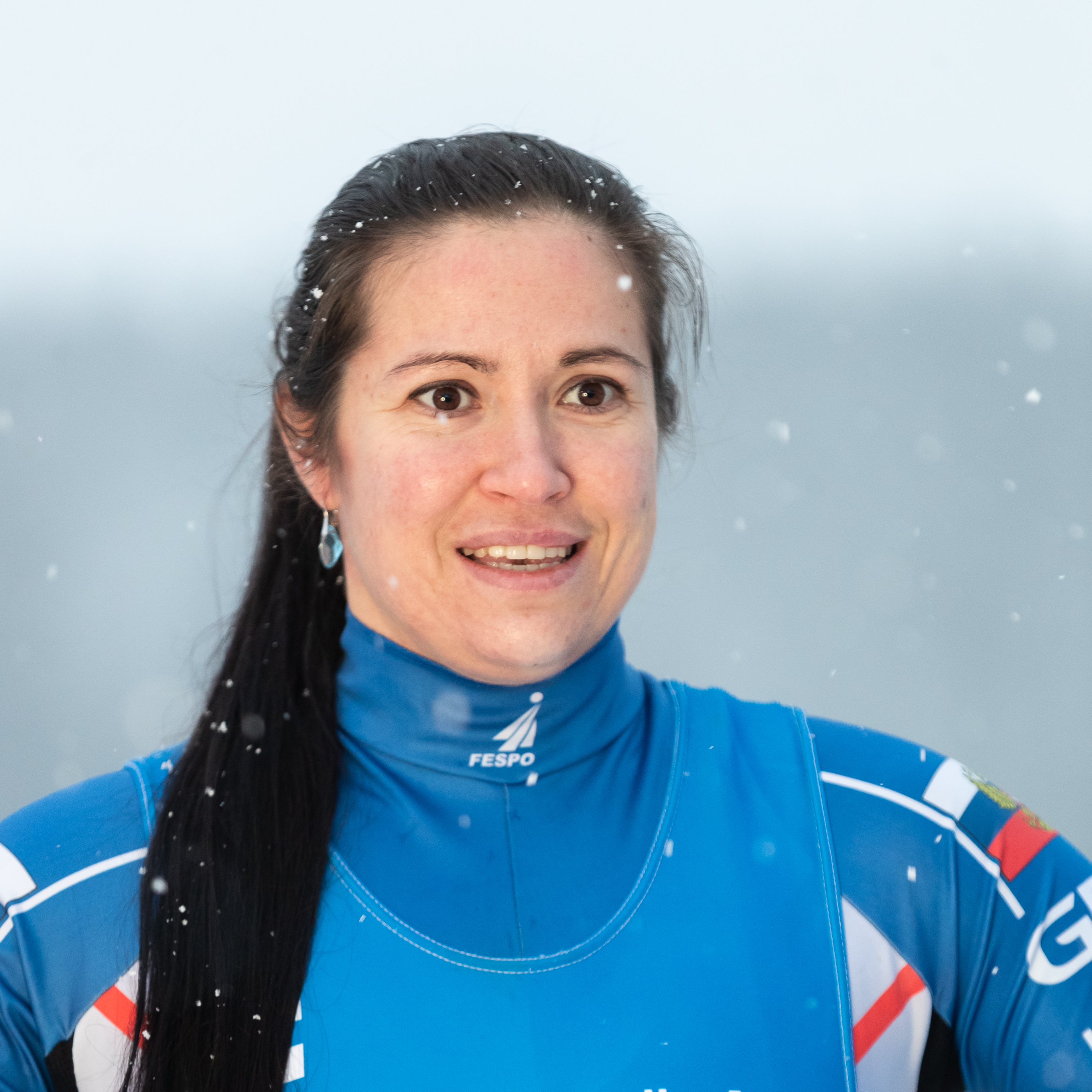
- Ivanova in 2021

Personal information
- Full name: Tatiana Ivanovna Ivanova
- Nationality: Russian
- Born: 16 February 1991 (age 35) Chusovoy, Soviet Union
- Height: 1.74 m (5 ft 9 in)
- Weight: 65 kg (143 lb)

Sport
- Country: Russia
- Sport: Luge
- Event: Singles
Medal record
Women's luge
Representing ROC
Olympic Games
Bronze medal – third place	2022 Beijing	Singles
Representing Russia
Olympic Games
Silver medal – second place	2014 Sochi	Team relay
World Championships
Gold medal – first place	2019 Winterberg	Team relay
Silver medal – second place	2012 Altenberg	Singles
Silver medal – second place	2012 Altenberg	Team relay
Silver medal – second place	2015 Sigulda	Singles
Silver medal – second place	2015 Sigulda	Team relay
Silver medal – second place	2020 Sochi	Sprint
Bronze medal – third place	2016 Königssee	Singles
Bronze medal – third place	2017 Igls	Team relay
European Championships
Gold medal – first place	2010 Sigulda	Singles
Gold medal – first place	2012 Paramonovo	Singles
Gold medal – first place	2012 Paramonovo	Team relay
Gold medal – first place	2018 Sigulda	Singles
Gold medal – first place	2018 Sigulda	Team relay
Gold medal – first place	2020 Lillehammer	Singles
Gold medal – first place	2021 Sigulda	Singles
Gold medal – first place	2021 Sigulda	Team relay
Silver medal – second place	2014 Sigulda	Singles
Silver medal – second place	2015 Sochi	Team relay
Silver medal – second place	2017 Königssee	Singles
Bronze medal – third place	2013 Oberhof	Team relay
Bronze medal – third place	2015 Sochi	Singles
Bronze medal – third place	2016 Altenberg	Singles
Bronze medal – third place	2016 Altenberg	Team relay
Bronze medal – third place	2022 St. Moritz	Team relay

Tatiana Ivanovna Ivanova (Russian: Татьяна Ивановна Иванова; born 16 February 1991) is a Russian luger who has competed since 2000. She won the women's singles event at the FIL European Luge Championships in 2010, 2012, 2018 and 2020. Ivanova debuted in the World Cup in the 2008–09 season, finishing 17th.

== Career ==
She competed at her first Olympics in Vancouver, where she finished fourth. The same year Ivanova won the European Championships in Sigulda. Two years later the Russian finished second in the World Championships in Altenberg and successfully defended her title at the European Championships in Paramonovo.

At the 2014 Winter Olympics in Sochi, originally Ivanova, together with Albert Demchenko, Alexander Denisyev, and Vladislav Antonov won the silver medal in the team relay. In December 2017, she was one of eleven Russian athletes who were banned for life from the Olympics by the International Olympic Committee, after doping offences at the 2014 Winter Olympics. Her results at the Olympics were annulled. In January 2018, she successfully appealed against the lifetime ban as well as annulment of result at the court of arbitration for sport.

== World Cup podiums ==
Season	Date	Location	Discipline	Place
2010–11	16 January 2011	Oberhof, Germany	Team Relay	2nd
2010–11	23 January 2011	Altenberg, Germany	Team Relay	2nd
2010–11	20 February 2011	Sigulda, Latvia	Singles	2nd
2010–11	20 February 2011	Sigulda, Latvia	Team Relay	1st
2011–12	27 November 2011	Innsbruck, Austria	Team Relay	3rd
2011–12	10 December 2011	Whistler, Canada	Singles	3rd
2011–12	10 December 2011	Whistler, Canada	Team Relay	3rd
2011–12	17 December 2011	Calgary, Canada	Singles	3rd
2011–12	6 January 2012	Königssee, Germany	Team Relay	3rd
2011–12	26 February 2012	Paramonovo, Russia	Singles	1st
2012–13	9 December 2012	Altenberg, Germany	Team Relay	3rd
2012–13	16 December 2012	Sigulda, Latvia	Singles	1st
2012–13	16 December 2012	Sigulda, Latvia	Team Relay	3rd
2012–13	24 February 2013	Sochi, Russia	Team Relay	2nd
2013–14	17 November 2012	Lillehammer, Norway	Singles	2nd
2013–14	19 January 2013	Altenberg, Germany	Team Relay	1st
2014–15	18 January 2015	Oberhof, Germany	Team Relay	3rd
2014–15	1 February 2015	Lillehammer, Norway	Singles	1st
2014–15	1 February 2015	Lillehammer, Norway	Team Relay	2nd
2014–15	1 March 2015	Sochi, Russia	Singles	3rd
2014–15	1 March 2015	Sochi, Russia	Team Relay	2nd
2015–16	5 December 2015	Lake Placid, United States	Team Relay	3rd
2015–16	19 December 2015	Calgary, Canada	Singles (sprint)	3rd
2015–16	10 January 2016	Sigulda, Latvia	Singles	1st
2015–16	10 January 2016	Sigulda, Latvia	Team Relay	3rd
2015–16	7 February 2016	Sochi, Russia	Singles	1st
2015–16	7 February 2016	Sochi, Russia	Team Relay	1st
2015–16	14 February 2016	Altenberg, Germany	Singles	3rd
2015–16	21 February 2016	Winterberg, Germany	Singles	3rd
2015–16	21 February 2016	Winterberg, Germany	Team Relay	2nd
2016–17	6 January 2017	Königssee, Germany	Singles	2nd
2016–17	14 January 2017	Sigulda, Latvia	Singles	3rd
2016–17	15 January 2017	Sigulda, Latvia	Singles (sprint)	1st
2016–17	15 January 2017	Sigulda, Latvia	Team Relay	1st
2016–17	5 February 2017	Oberhof, Germany	Singles	3rd
2016–17	5 February 2017	Oberhof, Germany	Mixed Relay	2nd
2016–17	18 February 2017	Pyeongchang, South Korea	Singles	1st
2017–18	28 January 2018	Sigulda, Latvia	Singles	1st
2017–18	28 January 2018	Sigulda, Latvia	Singles (sprint)	1st
2017–18	28 January 2018	Sigulda, Latvia	Team Relay	1st
2018–19	1 December 2018	Whistler, Canada	Team Relay	1st
2018–19	12 January 2019	Sigulda, Latvia	Singles	1st
2018–19	13 January 2019	Sigulda, Latvia	Team Relay	2nd
2019–20	23 November 2019	Innsbruck, Austria	Singles	1st
2019–20	13 December 2019	Whistler, Canada	Singles	1st
2019–20	14 December 2019	Whistler, Canada	Singles (sprint)	1st
2019–20	12 January 2020	Altenberg, Germany	Singles	2nd
2019–20	12 January 2020	Altenberg, Germany	Team Relay	1st
2019–20	18 January 2020	Lillehammer, Norway	Singles	1st
2019–20	25 January 2020	Sigulda, Latvia	Singles	2nd
2019–20	26 January 2020	Sigulda, Latvia	Singles (sprint)	3rd
2019–20	2 February 2020	Oberhof, Germany	Singles	2nd
2019–20	22 February 2020	Winterberg, Germany	Singles	2nd
2019–20	23 February 2020	Winterberg, Germany	Team Relay	1st
2020–21	5 December 2020	Altenberg, Germany	Singles	1st
2020–21	6 December 2020	Altenberg, Germany	Team Relay	2nd
2020–21	9 January 2021	Sigulda, Latvia	Singles	1st
2020–21	10 January 2021	Sigulda, Latvia	Team Relay	1st
2021–22	9 January 2022	Sigulda, Latvia	Singles	3rd
2021–22	9 January 2022	Sigulda, Latvia	Singles (sprint)	1st
