= Schlögl =

Schlögl is a German language occupational surname. Notable people with the name include:

- Karl Schlögl (1924–2007), Austrian chemist
- Luis Schlögl, Austrian luger
- Robert Schlögl (1954), German chemist
