= Joseph Heller (disambiguation) =

Joseph Heller (1923–1999) was an American satirical novelist.

Joseph, Josef or Yosef Heller may also refer to:

- Joseph Heller (historian) (born 1937), Israeli historian
- Joseph Heller (zoologist) (born 1941), Israeli zoologist
- Josef Heller, German-Czechoslovak luger
- Yosef Heller, American Jewish Orthodox rabbi
