= FIL World Luge Championships 1955 =

The FIL World Luge Championships 1955 took place in Oslo, Norway under the auspices of the Fédération Internationale de Bobsleigh et de Tobogganing (FIBT - International Bobsleigh and Tobogganing Federation in (in French)) under their "Section de Luge". It would be the only world championship under the FIBT until formation of the International Luge Federation (FIL) in 1957.

== Men's singles ==
| Medal | Athlete | Time |
|---|---|---|
| Gold | Anton Salvesen (NOR) | |
| Silver | Josef Thaler (AUT) | |
| Bronze | Josef Isser (AUT) | |

== Women's singles ==
| Medal | Athlete | Time |
|---|---|---|
| Gold | Karla Kienzl (AUT) | |
| Silver | Maria Isser (AUT) | |
| Bronze | Marianne Bauer (GER) | |

== Men's doubles ==
| Medal | Athlete | Time |
|---|---|---|
| Gold | Austria (Hans Krausner, Josef Thaler) | |
| Silver | Austria (Josef Isser, Maria Isser) | |
| Bronze | West Germany (Josef Strillinger, Fritz Nachmann) | |

The Issers were the first man and woman to medal in doubles in the history of the World Championships, European Championships, or Winter Olympics.

== Medal table ==
| Rank | Nation | Gold | Silver | Bronze | Total |
|---|---|---|---|---|---|
| 1 | Austria (AUT) | 2 | 3 | 1 | 6 |
| 2 | Norway (NOR) | 1 | 0 | 0 | 1 |
| 3 | West Germany (FRG) | 0 | 0 | 2 | 2 |
| Totals (3 entries) | | 3 | 3 | 3 | 9 |
