= Seewald (surname) =

Seewald is a surname of German origin. Notable people with the surname include:

- Jessa Duggar Seewald (born 1992), American television personality
- Liesl Seewald, Austrian luger
- Willy Seewald (1900–1929), Brazilian athlete
