= FIL European Luge Championships 1953 =

The FIL European Luge Championships 1953 took place in Cortina d'Ampezzo, Italy under the auspices of the Fédération Internationale de Bobsleigh et de Tobogganing (FIBT - International Bobsleigh and Tobogganing Federation in (in French)) under their "Section de Luge", a trend that would continue until the International Luge Federation (FIL) was formed in 1957. The Austrians repeated their feat at the 1951 European championships by sweeping all of the medals in all three events.

== Men's singles ==
Medal	Athlete	Time
Gold	Paul Aste (AUT)	
Silver	Heinrich Isser (AUT)	
Bronze	Albert Krauss (AUT)	

== Women's singles ==
Medal	Athlete	Time
Gold	Maria Isser (AUT)	
Silver	Liesl Seewald (AUT)	
Bronze	Rosa Lesser (AUT)	

== Men's doubles ==
Medal	Athlete	Time
Gold	Austria (Hans Krausner, Wilhelm Lache)	
Silver	Austria (Paul Aste, Heinrich Isser)	
Bronze	Austria (Erich Raffl, Stefan Schöpf)	

== Medal table ==
Rank	Nation	Gold	Silver	Bronze	Total
1	Austria (AUT)	3	3	3	9
Totals (1 entries)		3	3	3	9
