= Wilhelm Lache =

Austrian luger

Medal record

Luge

European Championships
Gold medal – first place	1953 Cortina d'Ampezzo	Men's doubles
Silver medal – second place	1951 Igls	Men's singles
Silver medal – second place	1954 Davos	Men's singles
Bronze medal – third place	1952 Garmisch-Partenkirchen	Men's singles
Bronze medal – third place	1952 Garmisch-Partenkirchen	Men's doubles

Wilhelm Lache was an Austrian lugist who competed during the 1950s. He won five medals at the European Luge championships, including one gold (Men's doubles: 1953), two silvers (Men's singles: 1951, 1954), and two bronzes (Men's singles and doubles: both 1952).
