= Gertrude Porsche-Schinkeová =

Czech luger

Medal record

Luge

European Championships
| Bronze medal – third place | 1934 Ilmenau | Women's singles |
| Bronze medal – third place | 1935 Krynica | Women's singles |

Gertrude Porsche-Schinkeová was a Czechoslovak luger of German ethnicity who competed during the mid-1930s. She won two bronze medals in the women's singles event at the European luge championships (1934, 1935).
