= FIL European Luge Championships 2013 =

The 2013 FIL European Luge Championships took place under the auspices of the International Luge Federation at Oberhof, Germany from 12 to 13 January 2013.

== Medalists ==
Event	Gold		Silver		Bronze	
Men's singles	Germany; Felix Loch	1:27.257	Germany; Andi Langenhan	1:27.647	Germany; Johannes Ludwig	1:27.776
Women's singles	Germany; Natalie Geisenberger	1:23.597	Germany; Tatjana Hüfner	1:23.784	Germany; Anke Wischnewski	1:23.896
Doubles	Germany; Toni Eggert; Sascha Benecken	1:23.240	Germany; Tobias Arlt; Tobias Wendl	1:23.262	Austria; Peter Penz; Georg Fischler	1:23.464
Team relay	Germany; Natalie Geisenberger; Felix Loch; Toni Eggert/Sascha Benecken	2:24.291	Italy; Sandra Gasparini; Armin Zöggeler; Christian Oberstolz/Patrick Gruber	2:24.752	Russia; Tatiana Ivanova; Albert Demchenko; Vladislav Yuzhakov/Vladimir Makhnutin	2:25.048

== Medal table ==
* Host nation (Germany)

Rank	Nation	Gold	Silver	Bronze	Total
1	Germany*	4	3	2	9
2	Italy	0	1	0	1
3	Austria	0	0	1	1
3	Russia	0	0	1	1
Totals (4 entries)		4	4	4	12
