= Rudolf Hermann =

Czechoslovak luger

Medal record

Luge

European Championships
Silver medal – second place	1934 Ilmenau	Men's doubles
Bronze medal – third place	1938 Salzburg	Men's singles
Bronze medal – third place	1939 Reichenberg	Men's doubles

Rudolf Hermann was a Czechoslovak luger who competed during the 1930s. He won three medals at the European luge championships with one silver (Men's doubles: 1934) and two bronzes (Men's singles: 1938, Men's doubles: 1939).
