= Erhard Grundmann =

German luger

Medal record

Luge

European Championships
Bronze medal – third place	1938 Salzburg	Men's doubles
Bronze medal – third place	1955 Hahnenklee	Men's doubles

Erhard Grundmann was a German luger from Czechoslovakia. He competed between the late 1930s and the mid-1950s for Czechoslovakia and later for West Germany. He won two bronze medals in the men's doubles event at the European luge championships (1938 for Czechoslovakia, 1955 for West Germany).
