= Maria Isser =

Austrian luger (1929–2011)

Medal record

Luge

World Championships
Gold medal – first place	1957 Davos	Women's singles
Gold medal – first place	1960 Garmisch-Partenkirchen	Women's singles
Silver medal – second place	1955 Oslo	Women's singles
Silver medal – second place	1955 Oslo	Doubles
Silver medal – second place	1959 Villard-de-Lans	Women's singles

European Championships
Gold medal – first place	1952 Garmisch-Partenkirchen	Women's singles
Gold medal – first place	1953 Cortina d'Ampezzo	Women's singles
Gold medal – first place	1954 Davos	Women's singles
Gold medal – first place	1954 Davos	Doubles
Gold medal – first place	1955 Hahnenklee	Women's singles
Silver medal – second place	1956 Imst	Women's singles
Bronze medal – third place	1951 Igls	Women's singles

Maria Isser (22 October 1929 in Matrei am Brenner – 25 February 2011 in Innsbruck) was an Austrian luger who competed during the early 1950s and early 1960s. She won five medals at the FIL World Luge Championships with two golds (Women's singles: 1957, 1960) and three silvers (Women's singles: 1955, 1959; Doubles: 1955).

At the European championships, Isser won six medals in the women's singles event and one in the doubles event. This included five straight golds (Women's singles:1952–1955, Doubles: 1954), one silver (Women's singles: 1956), and one bronze (Women's singles: 1951). Maria's European gold in the doubles event in 1954 with her brother Josef was the first time a woman ever won a medal in a doubles event at a World Championships, Winter Olympics, or European Championships until the debut of a mixed team event at both the European and World Championships in the late 1980s. Next year Maria and Josef finished at 2nd place in the doubles event at the 1955 World Championships. In the 1958 World Championships, the silver and bronze pairs from Poland included one woman each.
