= FIL European Luge Championships 2012 =

The 2012 FIL European Luge Championships took place under the auspices of the International Luge Federation at Paramonovo, Russia from 25 to 26 February 2012.

== Medalists ==
Event	Gold		Silver		Bronze	
Men's singles	Germany; Andi Langenhan	1:31.876	Italy; Armin Zöggeler	1:31.961	Germany; Felix Loch	1:32.042
Women's singles	Russia; Tatiana Ivanova	1:32.262	Germany; Tatjana Hüfner	1:32.497	Germany; Corinna Martini	1:32.509
Doubles	Austria; Peter Penz; Georg Fischler	1:31.688	Germany; Tobias Arlt; Tobias Wendl	1:31.837	Germany; Toni Eggert; Sascha Benecken	1:31.952
Team relay	Russia; Tatiana Ivanova; Albert Demchenko; Vladislav Yuzhakov/Vladimir Makhnutin	2:31.975	Germany; Tatjana Hüfner; Andi Langenhan; Tobias Arlt/Tobias Wendl	2:32.208	Italy; Sandra Gasparini; Armin Zöggeler; Christian Oberstolz/Patrick Gruber	2:32.218

== Medal table ==
* Host nation (Russia)

Rank	Nation	Gold	Silver	Bronze	Total
1	Russia*	2	0	0	2
2	Germany	1	3	3	7
3	Austria	1	0	0	1
4	Italy	0	1	1	2
Totals (4 entries)		4	4	4	12
