= Alfred Posselt =

Czech luger

Medal record

Luge

European Championships
Bronze medal – third place	1928 Schreiberhau	Men's doubles
Bronze medal – third place	1934 Ilmenau	Men's singles

Alfred Posselt was a Czechoslovak luger of German ethnicity who competed from the late 1920s to the mid-1930s. He won two bronze medals at the European luge championships (Men's singles: 1934, Men's doubles: 1928).
