= Ivan Nagler =

Italian luger (born 1999)

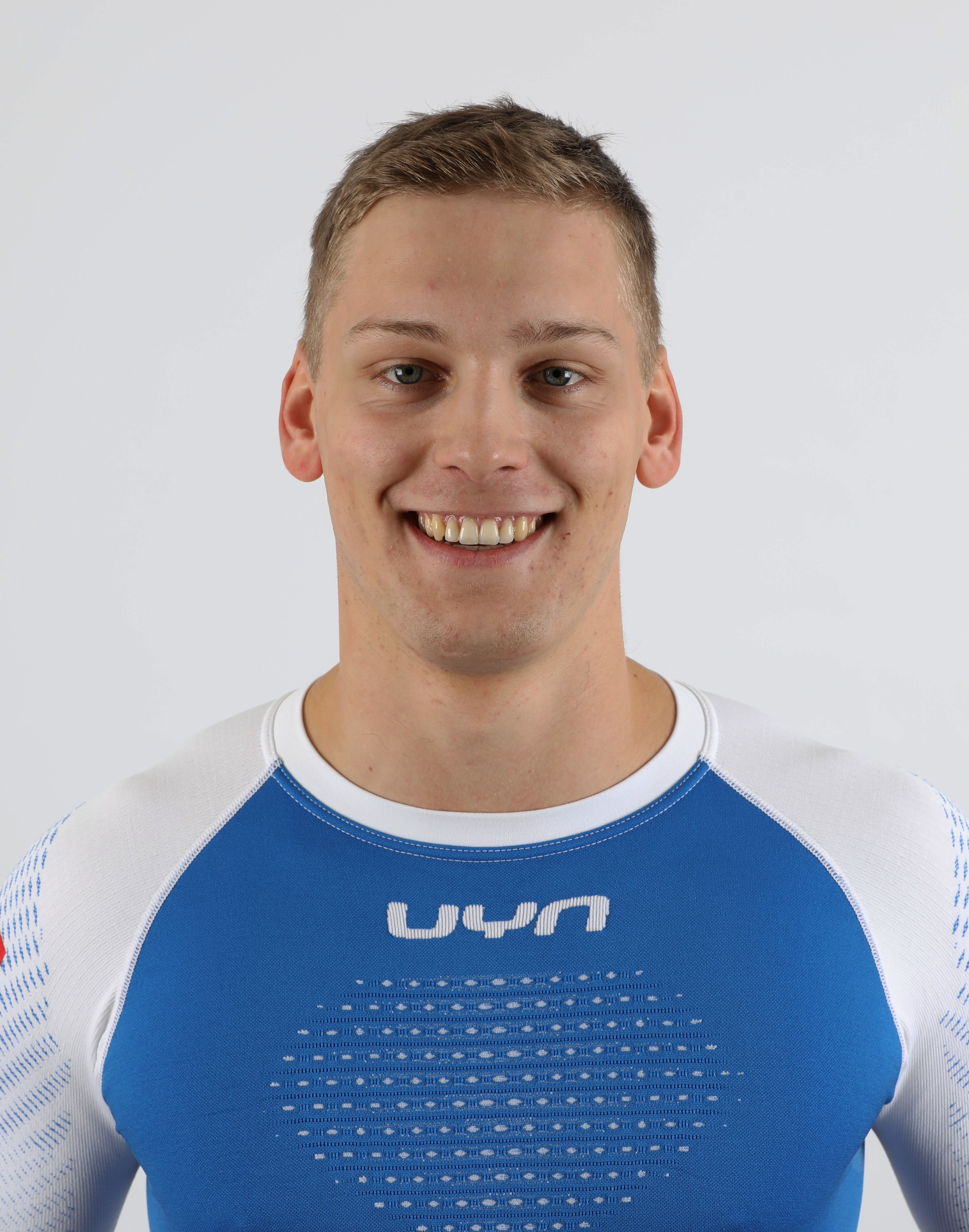
- Nagler in 2018

Personal information
- Nationality: Italian
- Born: 30 January 1999 (age 27) Bruneck, Italy
- Height: 185 cm (6 ft 1 in)
- Weight: 82 kg (181 lb)

Sport
- Country: Italy
- Sport: Luge
- Club: C.S. Carabinieri
Medal record
European Championships
| Gold medal – first place | 2019 Oberhof | Team relay |
| Silver medal – second place | 2020 Lillehammer | Team relay |
| Bronze medal – third place | 2025 Winterberg | Team relay |

Ivan Nagler (born 30 January 1999) is an Italian luger. He competed in the men's doubles event at the 2018 Winter Olympics. Nagler is an athlete of the Centro Sportivo Carabinieri.
