= Josef Isser =

Austrian bobsledder and luger

Medal record

Luge

World Championships
Silver medal – second place	1955 Oslo	Men's doubles
Bronze medal – third place	1955 Oslo	Men's singles

European Championships
Gold medal – first place	1954 Davos	Men's doubles
Gold medal – first place	1956 Imst	Men's singles
Silver medal – second place	1951 Igls	Men's doubles
Bronze medal – third place	1952 Garmisch-Partenkirchen	Men's doubles

Bobsleigh

World Championships
Silver medal – second place	1955 St. Moritz	Two-man
Bronze medal – third place	1958 Garmisch-Partenkirchen	Two-man
Bronze medal – third place	1962 Garmisch-Partenkirchen	Four-man

Josef "Pepi" Isser is an Austrian luger who competed in the 1950s. He won two medals at the inaugural event at the FIL World Luge Championships in Oslo in 1955 with a silver in the men's doubles and a bronze in the men's singles events. His silver in the men's doubles was with his sister Maria marked the only time a woman ever won a medal in a men's event at a World Championships, Winter Olympics, or European Championships until the debut of a mixed team event at both the European and World Championships in the late 1980s.

Isser also won four medals at the European luge championships with two golds (Men's singles: 1956, Men's doubles: 1954), one silver (Men's doubles: 1951), and one bronze (Men's bronze: 1952).

In bobsleigh, Isser won three medals at the FIBT World Championships with one silver (Two-man: 1955) and two bronzes (Two-man: 1958, Four-man: 1962).
