= Paul Aste =

Austrian bobsledder and luger (1916–1988)

Medal record

Bobsleigh

World Championships
Silver medal – second place	1955 St. Moritz	Two-man
Bronze medal – third place	1958 Garmisch-Partenkirchen	Two-man

Luge

European Championships
Gold medal – first place	1951 Igls	Men's singles
Gold medal – first place	1952 Garmisch-Partenkirchen	Men's doubles
Gold medal – first place	1953 Cortina d'Ampezzo	Men's singles
Gold medal – first place	1955 Hahnenklee	Men's singles
Gold medal – first place	1955 Hahnenklee	Men's doubles
Silver medal – second place	1952 Garmisch-Partenkirchen	Men's singles
Silver medal – second place	1953 Cortina d'Ampezzo	Men's doubles

Paul Aste (5 December 1916 – 29 March 1988) was an Austrian bobsledder and luger who competed during the 1950s and the 1960s. He also took the Olympic Oath for athletes at the 1964 Winter Olympics in Innsbruck.

== Background ==
Aste was born in Matrei in Osttirol, Austria on 5 December 1916. He died in Steinach am Brenner, Austria on 29 March 1988, at the age of 71.

== Luge career ==
As a luger, Aste won seven medals in the European luge championships with five golds (Men's singles: 1951, 1953, 1955; Men's doubles: 1952, 1955) and two silvers (Men's singles: 1952, Men's doubles: 1953).

== Bobsleigh career ==
Aste also competed in bobsleigh during the 1950s and 1960s. He earned two medals in the two-man event at the FIBT World Championships with a silver in 1955 and a bronze in 1958. Aste competed in three Winter Olympics for Austria in bobsled, earning his best finish of fifth in the four-man event at Oslo in 1952 (Luge would not become a Winter Olympic sport until the 1964 games in Innsbruck.).

== Role at the 1964 Winter Olympics ==
At the 1964 Winter Olympics in Innsbruck, Aste played three roles. His first was as a bobsleigh and luge course designer, creating a separate 13-turn bobsleigh and an 18-turn luge course used for each event. Aste's second role was taking the Olympic Oath for athletes during the opening ceremonies of the games. Finally, Aste finished seventh in the four-man event on the course he designed and constructed the previous year.

Aste created some controversy with his recitation of the Olympic oath. Where the traditional oath ended "for the glory of the sports and the honor of our countries", he replaced the word "countries" with "teams". This change was deliberate and reflected Aste's belief that nationalism had negatively affected the Games. His one word substitution sparked significant debate, including a direct rebuff from a representative of the Soviet Union.

== Bobsleigh track concern ==
When the bobsleigh track was completed in time for the 1963 FIBT World Championships in Igls, Austria (located southeast of Innsbruck), there were a total of 20 injuries on the track during those championships. Because this event was also part of the Olympic test competition, it would lead to design changes to make the track safer prior to the 1964 games.

== Sources ==
- 1956 bobsleigh two-man results
- Bobsleigh two-man world championship medalists since 1931
- IOC website on 1964 Winter Olympics
- Official Olympic Report of the IX Winter Olympics - Innsbruck 1964. pp. 40, 65. (in German)
- Time magazine February 15, 1963 article on the 1964 bobsleigh track competition that lead to safety changes on the track
- Wallenchinsky, David. (1984). "Bobsled: Four-Man". In The Complete Book the Olympics: 1896-1980. New York: Penguin Books. p. 561.
