= Waltraut Grassl =

Czechoslovak luger

Medal record

Luge

European Championships
Silver medal – second place	1938 Salzburg	Women's singles
Silver medal – second place	1939 Liberec	Women's singles

Waltraut Grassl was a luger from Czechoslovakia who competed in the late 1930s. She won a silver medal in the women's singles event at the 1938 FIL European Luge Championships in Salzburg, Austria and one year later in Liberec.
