= Walter Kluge =

German luger (died 1944)

Medal record

Luge

European Championships
Gold medal – first place	1934 Ilmenau	Men's doubles
Gold medal – first place	1935 Krynica	Men's doubles
Gold medal – first place	1938 Salzburg	Men's doubles
Gold medal – first place	1939 Reichenberg	Men's doubles
Silver medal – second place	1937 Oslo	Men's doubles
Silver medal – second place	1938 Salzburg	Men's singles

Walter Kluge was a German luger who competed during the 1930s. He was an active fighter against German fascism and was killed on 22 April 1944 in prison in Brandenburg-Görden. He lived in Schmölln (near Altenburg). He won six medals at the European luge championships with four golds (Men's doubles: 1934, 1935, 1938, 1939) and two silvers (Men's singles: 1938, Men's doubles: 1937).
