= 2019 FIL European Luge Championships =

- Venue: Oberhof bobsleigh, luge, and skeleton track, Oberhof, Germany
- Dates: 9–10 February
- Competitors: 81 from 14 nations

The 2019 FIL European Luge Championships took place under the auspices of the International Luge Federation at the Oberhof bobsleigh, luge, and skeleton track in Oberhof, Germany from 9 to 10 February 2019.

== Schedule ==
Four events were held.

Date	Time	Events
9 February	09:35	Doubles 1st run
9 February	11:05	Doubles 2nd run
9 February	12:35	Men 1st run
9 February	14:15	Men 2nd run
10 February	09:00	Women 1st run
10 February	10:25	Women 2nd run
10 February	13:40	Team relay

== Medal summary ==
=== Medal table ===
* Host nation (Germany)

Rank	Nation	Gold	Silver	Bronze	Total
1	Germany (GER)*	2	3	1	6
2	Russia (RUS)	1	1	0	2
3	Italy (ITA)	1	0	0	1
4	Latvia (LAT)	0	0	3	3
Totals (4 entries)		4	4	4	12

=== Medalists ===
Event	Gold		Silver		Bronze	
Men's singles	Semen Pavlichenko; Russia	1:26.203	Roman Repilov; Russia	1:26.247	Kristers Aparjods; Latvia	1:26.384
Women's singles	Natalie Geisenberger; Germany	1:22.810	Tatjana Hüfner; Germany	1:23.033	Dajana Eitberger; Germany	1:23.127
Doubles	Germany; Tobias Wendl; Tobias Arlt	1:21.951	Germany; Toni Eggert; Sascha Benecken	1:22.151	Latvia; Andris Šics; Juris Šics	1:22.274
Team relay	Italy; Andrea Voetter; Dominik Fischnaller; Ivan Nagler / Fabian Malleier	2:22.827	Germany; Natalie Geisenberger; Johannes Ludwig; Tobias Wendl / Tobias Arlt	2:22.943	Latvia; Elīza Cauce; Inārs Kivlenieks; Andris Šics / Juris Šics	2:23.256
