= Hans Krausner =

Austrian luger

Medal record

Luge

World Championships
Gold medal – first place	1955 Oslo	Men's doubles

European Championships
Gold medal – first place	1951 Igls	Men's doubles
Gold medal – first place	1953 Cortina d'Ampezzo	Men's doubles
Silver medal – second place	1952 Garmisch-Partenkirchen	Men's doubles
Silver medal – second place	1956 Imst	Men's singles
Bronze medal – third place	1954 Davos	Men's doubles

Hans Krausner is an Austrian luger who competed in the 1950s. He won a gold medal in the men's doubles event at the inaugural FIL World Luge Championships in Oslo in 1955.

Krausner also won five medals at the European luge championships with two golds (Men's doubles: 1951, 1953), two silvers (Men's singles: 1956, Men's doubles: 1952), and one bronze (1954).
