= Viktor Schubert =

German luger

Medal record

Luge

European Championships
Silver medal – second place	1938 Salzburg	Men's doubles
Silver medal – second place	1939 Reichenberg	Men's doubles

Viktor Schubert was a German luger who competed in the late 1930s. He won two silver medals in the men's doubles event at the European luge championships (1938, 1939).
