= Juris Šics =

Latvian luger (born 1983)

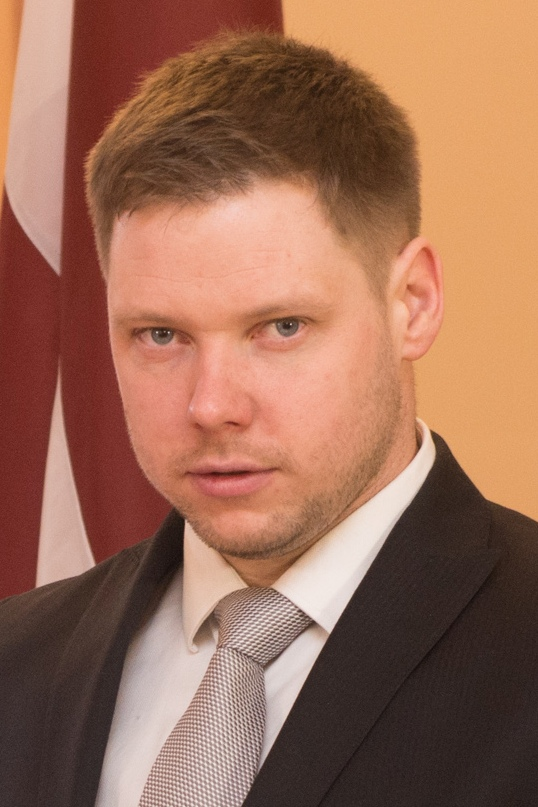
- Šics in 2015

Personal information
- Nationality: Latvian
- Born: 26 April 1983 (age 43) Sigulda, Latvia
- Height: 174 cm (5 ft 9 in)
- Weight: 82 kg (181 lb)

Sport
- Country: Latvia
- Sport: Luge
- Event: Doubles
Medal record
Representing Latvia
Olympic Games
Silver medal – second place	2010 Vancouver	Doubles
Bronze medal – third place	2014 Sochi	Doubles
Bronze medal – third place	2014 Sochi	Mixed team
World Championships
Silver medal – second place	2016 Königssee	Mixed team
Silver medal – second place	2020 Sochi	Mixed team
Silver medal – second place	2021 Königssee	Sprint
Bronze medal – third place	2008 Oberhof	Mixed team
Bronze medal – third place	2009 Lake Placid	Mixed team
Bronze medal – third place	2011 Cesana	Doubles
Bronze medal – third place	2013 Whistler	Mixed team
Bronze medal – third place	2021 Königssee	Doubles
Bronze medal – third place	2021 Königssee	Mixed team
European Championships
Gold medal – first place	2008 Cesana	Mixed team
Gold medal – first place	2010 Sigulda	Mixed team
Gold medal – first place	2021 Sigulda	Doubles
Silver medal – second place	2014 Sigulda	Mixed team
Silver medal – second place	2016 Altenberg	Mixed team
Silver medal – second place	2018 Sigulda	Doubles
Silver medal – second place	2021 Sigulda	Mixed team
Bronze medal – third place	2006 Winterberg	Mixed team
Bronze medal – third place	2015 Sochi	Doubles
Bronze medal – third place	2015 Sochi	Mixed team
Bronze medal – third place	2017 Königssee	Mixed team
Bronze medal – third place	2018 Sigulda	Mixed team
Bronze medal – third place	2019 Oberhof	Doubles
Bronze medal – third place	2019 Oberhof	Mixed team
Bronze medal – third place	2020 Lillehammer	Mixed team

Juris Šics (born 26 April 1983) is a former Latvian luger. He competed in the 2006, 2010 and 2014 Winter Olympics, and won a silver medal in the men's doubles event in 2010 and two bronze medals in 2014, alongside his teammate and younger brother Andris Šics. The Šics brothers' three medals mean they have won more Olympic medals than any other Latvian sportsperson.

Šics won six medals at the FIL World Luge Championships with two silvers (Mixed team: 2016, 2020) and four bronzes (Men's doubles: 2011, Mixed team: 2008, 2009, 2013). He also won 15 medals at the FIL European Luge Championships with three golds in 2008, 2010 and 2021, four silvers in 2014, 2016, 2018 and 2021, and eight bronzes in 2006, 2015, 2017, 2018, 2019 and 2020. The Šics' best individual European championship is winning the men's doubles event in 2021, when the bronze medal was also won by a Latvian pair, Mārtiņš Bots and Roberts Plūme.

In 2022, after the end of his playing career, Juris Šics became a coach.
