= Werner Rüger =

German luger

Medal record

Luge

Representing Germany

European Championships
Silver medal – second place	1938 Salzburg	Men's doubles

Werner Rüger was a German luger who competed in the late 1930s. He won a silver medal in the men's doubles event at the 1938 European luge championships in Salzburg, Austria.
