= Richard Feist =

German luger

Medal record

Luge

European Championships
Gold medal – first place	1929 Semmering	Men's doubles
Silver medal – second place	1928 Schreiberhau	Men's doubles

Richard Feist was a German luger who competed in the late 1920s. He won two medals in the men's doubles event at the European championships with a gold in 1929 and a silver in 1928.
