= Denis Geppert =

German luger (born 1976)

Medal record

Luge

Representing Germany

European Championships
Silver medal – second place	2002 Altenberg	Men's singles
Silver medal – second place	2002 Altenberg	Mixed team

Denis Geppert (born 24 January 1976) is a German luger who competed between 1996 and 2006. He earned two silver medals at the 2002 FIL European Luge Championships in Altenberg, Germany in the men's singles and mixed team events.

Geppert also finished seventh in the men's singles event at the 2002 Winter Olympics in Salt Lake City.
