= Friedel Tietze =

German luger (1908–1953)

Medal record

Luge

European Championships
Gold medal – first place	1938 Salzburg	Women's singles
Gold medal – first place	1939 Reichenberg	Women's singles

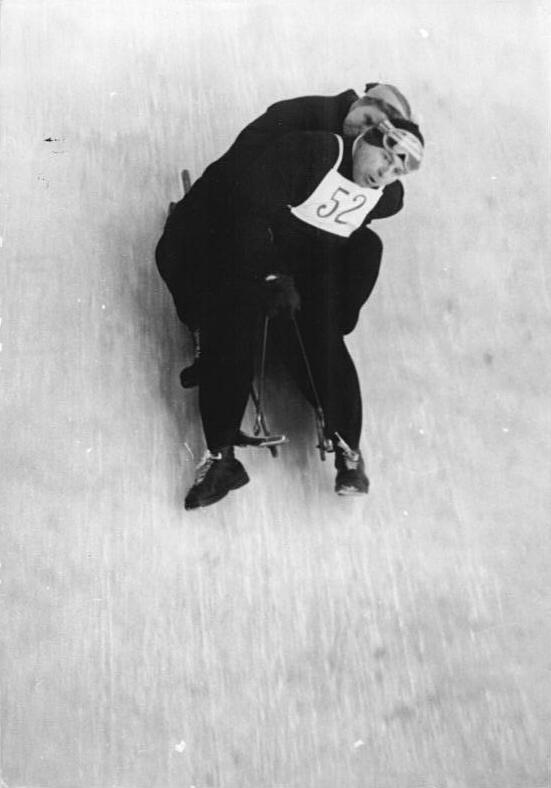

Friedel Tietze (1908–1953) was a German luger who competed in the late 1930s. She won two gold medals in the women's singles event at the European luge championships (1938, 1939).

After World War II, Tietze moved from the Karkonosze mountains to East Germany. There she married and became known as Friedel Kienzel-Tietze. She competed in the East German national championships up to her death year in 1953.

Tietze's older brother, Martin, won seven European championship medals in luge during the 1930s.
