= Heinrich Isser =

Austrian bobsledder and luger

Medal record

Bobsleigh

Representing Austria

World Championships
Bronze medal – third place	1958 Garmisch-Partenkirchen	Two-man
Bronze medal – third place	1962 Garmisch-Partenkirchen	Four-man

Luge

European Championships
Gold medal – first place	1952 Garmisch-Partenkirchen	Men's doubles
Gold medal – first place	1955 Hanenklee	Men's doubles
Silver medal – second place	1951 Igls	Men's doubles
Silver medal – second place	1953 Cortina d'Ampezzo	Men's singles
Silver medal – second place	1953 Cortina d'Ampezzo	Men's doubles

Heinrich "Heini" Isser (12 May 1928 – 18 May 2004) was an Austrian bobsledder-luger who competed during the 1950s and 1960s. He was born in Matrei in Osttirol.

== Luge career ==
Isser won five medals at the European luge championships with two golds (Men's doubles: 1952, 1955) and three silvers (Men's singles: 1953, Men's doubles: 1951, 1953).

== Bobsled career ==
Isser also won a bronze medal in the Four-man event at the 1962 FIBT World Championships in Garmisch-Partenkirchen, West Germany. He also finished tenth in the four-man event as well as twelfth in the two-man event at the 1956 Winter Olympics in Cortina d'Ampezzo.
