= Hanni Fink =

Czech luger

Medal record

Luge

European Championships
Gold medal – first place	1934 Ilmenau	Women's singles
Gold medal – first place	1935 Krynica	Women's singles
Bronze medal – third place	1938 Salzburg	Women's singles
Bronze medal – third place	1939 Reichenberg	Women's singles

Hanni Fink (later Hanni Finková) was a luger from Czechoslovakia who competed during the 1930s. She won four medals in the women's singles event (all for Czechoslovakia) at the European luge championships with two golds under (1934, 1935) and two bronzes (1938, 1939). She was born in Smržovka.
