= Vladislav Yuzhakov =

Russian luger (born 1986)

Semen Pavlichenko
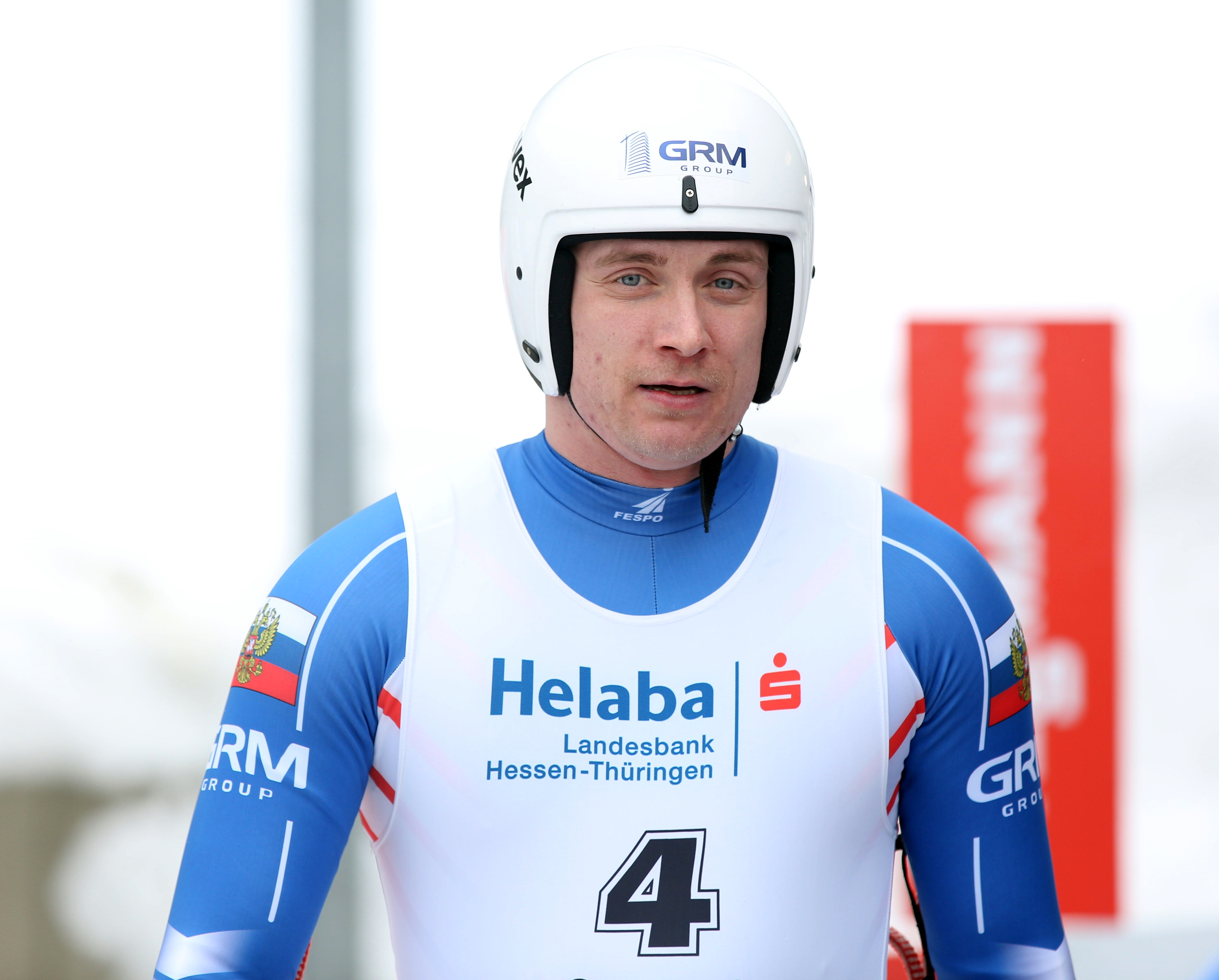

Personal information
- Full name: Vladislav Gennadyevich Yuzhakov
- Nationality: Russian
- Born: 25 January 1986 (age 40) Chusovoy, Russia
- Height: 1.83 m (6 ft 0 in)
- Weight: 76 kg (168 lb)

Sport
- Country: Russia
- Sport: Luge
- Event: Doubles
Medal record
Men's luge
Representing Russia
World Championships
Gold medal – first place	2019 Winterberg	Mixed team
Silver medal – second place	2012 Altenberg	Mixed team
European Championships
Gold medal – first place	2012 Paramonovo	Mixed team
Gold medal – first place	2014 Sigulda	Mixed team
Silver medal – second place	2014 Sigulda	Doubles
Bronze medal – third place	2013 Oberhof	Mixed team
Bronze medal – third place	2020 Lillehammer	Doubles

Vladislav Gennadyevich Yuzhakov (Russian: Владисла́в Генна́дьевич Южако́в; born 25 January 1986) is a Russian luger who has competed since 1995. His best Luge World Cup finish was 15th in men's doubles in 2007–08.

Yuzhakov qualified for the 2010 Winter Olympics where he finished tenth.

He participated at the 2019 FIL World Luge Championships, winning a medal.
