= 2020 FIL European Luge Championships =

International luge competition

2020 European Championships
- Location: Lillehammer Olympic Bobsleigh and Luge Track, Lillehammer, Norway
- Dates: 18–19 January

The 2020 FIL European Luge Championships were held from 18 to 19 January 2020 in Lillehammer, Norway.

== Schedule ==
Four events were held.

Date	Time	Events
18 January	09:50	Women 1st run
18 January	11:15	Women 2nd run
18 January	12:40	Doubles 1st run
18 January	14:00	Doubles 2nd run
19 January	09:20	Men 1st run
19 January	10:55	Men 2nd run
19 January	13:00	Team relay

== Medal summary ==
=== Medal table ===
Rank	Nation	Gold	Silver	Bronze	Total
1	Russia	2	1	3	6
2	Austria	1	1	0	2
2	Italy	1	1	0	2
4	Germany	0	1	0	1
5	Latvia	0	0	1	1
Totals (5 entries)		4	4	4	12

=== Medalists ===
Event	Gold		Silver		Bronze	
Men's singles	Dominik Fischnaller; Italy	1:37.737	Semen Pavlichenko; Russia	1:37.911	Roman Repilov; Russia	1:37.965
Women's singles	Tatiana Ivanova; Russia	1:35.482	Julia Taubitz; Germany	1:35.624	Victoria Demchenko; Russia	1:35.652
Doubles	Russia; Alexander Denisyev; Vladislav Antonov	1:35.585	Austria; Thomas Steu; Lorenz Koller	1:35.685	Russia; Vladislav Yuzhakov; Yuri Prokhorov	1:35.757
Team relay	Austria; Madeleine Egle; David Gleirscher; Thomas Steu / Lorenz Koller	2:36.912	Italy; Andrea Voetter; Dominik Fischnaller; Ivan Nagler / Fabian Malleier	2:37.020	Latvia; Ulla Zirne; Kristers Aparjods; Andris Šics / Juris Šics	2:37.543
