= 2025 FIL European Luge Championships =

Luge competition

- Venue: Winterberg bobsleigh, luge, and skeleton track
- Location: Winterberg, Germany
- Dates: 18–19 January

The 2025 FIL European Luge Championships were held from 18 to 19 January 2025 in Winterberg, Germany.

== Schedule ==
Five events were held.

All times are local (UTC+1).

Date	Time	Events
18 January	10:50	1st run Doubles Men
18 January	11:35	1st run Doubles Women
18 January	12:30	2nd run Doubles Men
18 January	13:10	2nd run Doubles Women
18 January	14:00	1st run Women
18 January	15:25	2nd run Women
19 January	09:25	1st run Men
19 January	10:50	2nd run Men
19 January	12:30	Team relay

== Medal summary ==
=== Medal table ===
* Host nation (Germany)

Rank	Nation	Gold	Silver	Bronze	Total
1	Austria	3	2	3	8
2	Germany*	2	3	0	5
3	Italy	0	0	2	2
Totals (3 entries)		5	5	5	15

=== Medalists ===
Event	Gold		Silver		Bronze	
Men's singles	Jonas Müller; Austria	1:41.742	Max Langenhan; Germany	1:41.797	Nico Gleirscher; Austria	1:41.843
Women's singles	Julia Taubitz; Germany	1:49.582	Madeleine Egle; Austria	1:49.780	Lisa Schulte; Austria	1:49.935
Men's doubles	Germany; Tobias Wendl; Tobias Arlt	1:25.152	Austria; Juri Gatt; Riccardo Schöpf	1:25.286	Austria; Yannick Müller; Armin Frauscher	1:25.354
Women's doubles	Austria; Selina Egle; Lara Kipp	1:26.467	Germany; Jessica Degenhardt; Cheyenne Rosenthal	1:26.481	Italy; Andrea Vötter; Marion Oberhofer	1:26.688
Team relay	Austria; Madeleine Egle; Juri Gatt / Riccardo Schöpf; Jonas Müller; Selina Egle / Lara Kipp	3:11.428	Germany; Julia Taubitz; Tobias Wendl / Tobias Arlt; Max Langenhan; Jessica Degenhardt / Cheyenne Rosenthal	3:11.519	Italy; Verena Hofer; Ivan Nagler / Fabian Malleier; Dominik Fischnaller; Andrea Vötter / Marion Oberhofer	3:12.008
