= Fabian Malleier =

Italian luger (born 1998)

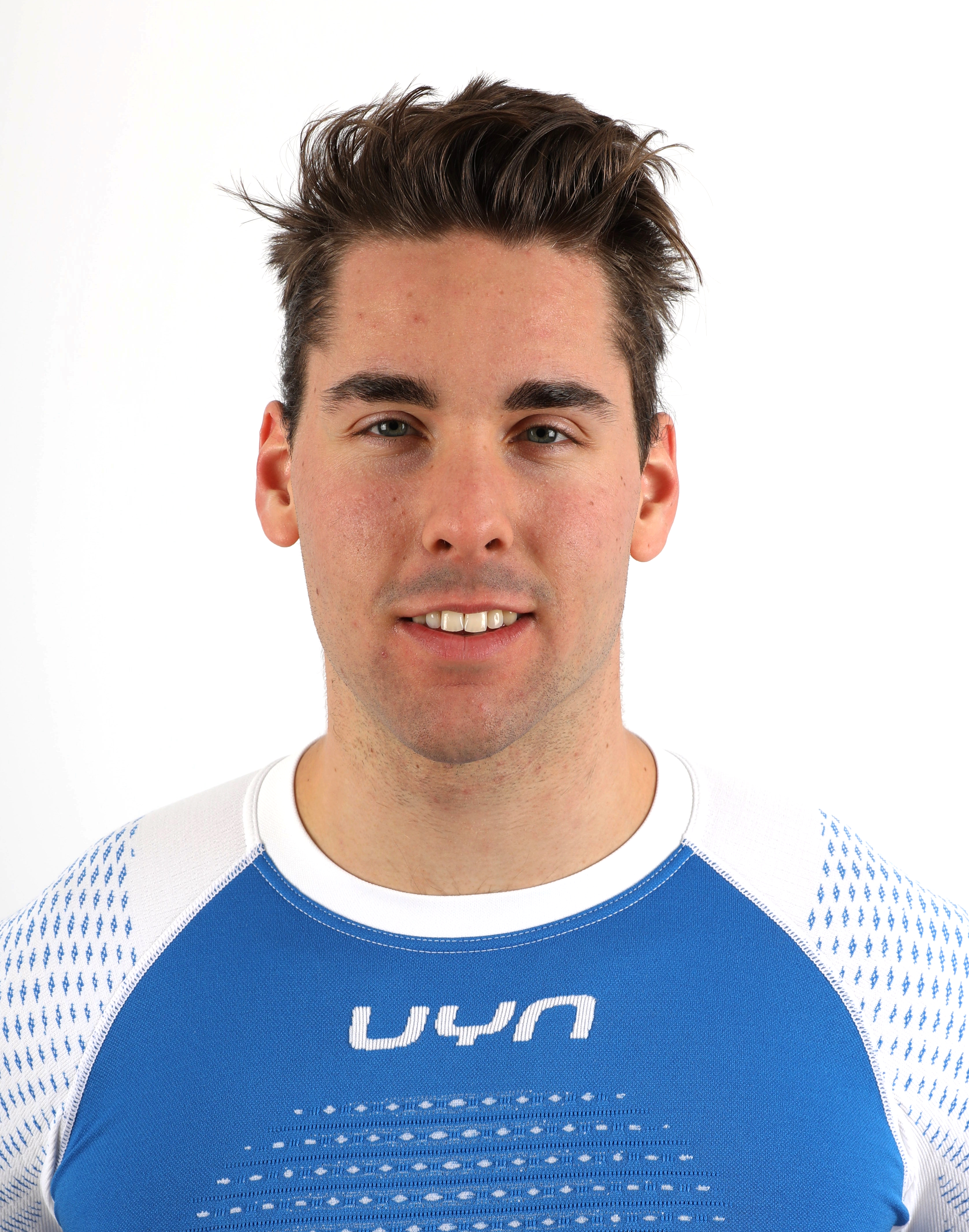
- Malleier in 2018

Personal information
- Nationality: Italian
- Born: 4 January 1998 (age 28) Meran, Italy
- Height: 176 cm (5 ft 9 in)
- Weight: 76 kg (168 lb)

Sport
- Country: Italy
- Sport: Luge
- Club: G.S. Esercito
Medal record
Winter Youth Olympic Games
Bronze medal – third place	2016 Lillehammer	Mixed team
European Championships
Gold medal – first place	2019 Oberhof	Team relay
Silver medal – second place	2020 Lillehammer	Team relay
Bronze medal – third place	2025 Winterberg	Team relay

Fabian Malleier (born 4 January 1998) is an Italian luger. He competed in the men's doubles event at the 2018 Winter Olympics. Malleier is an athlete of the Gruppo Sportivo Esercito.
