= FIL European Luge Championships 2016 =

The 2016 FIL European Luge Championships took place under the auspices of the International Luge Federation at Altenberg, Germany from 13 to 14 February 2016.

== Medalists ==
Event	Gold	Time	Silver	Time	Bronze	Time
Men's singles	Felix Loch; Germany	1:47.556	Roman Repilov; Russia	1:47.885	Ralf Palik; Germany	1:47.928
Women's singles	Tatjana Hüfner; Germany	1:46.379	Elīza Cauce; Latvia	1:46.590	Tatiana Ivanova; Russia	1:46.692
Doubles	Toni Eggert/Sascha Benecken; Germany	1:22.890	Tobias Arlt/Tobias Wendl; Germany	1:23.269	Peter Penz/Georg Fischler; Austria	1:23.471
Team relay	Germany; Tatjana Hüfner; Felix Loch; Toni Eggert/Sascha Benecken	2:24.204	Latvia; Elīza Cauce; Artūrs Dārznieks; Andris Šics/Juris Šics	2:24.982	Russia; Tatiana Ivanova; Roman Repilov; Alexander Denisyev/Vladislav Antonov	2:25.122

== Medal table ==
Rank	Nation	Gold	Silver	Bronze	Total
1	Germany (GER)	4	1	1	6
2	Latvia (LAT)	0	2	0	2
3	Russia (RUS)	0	1	2	3
4	Austria (AUT)	0	0	1	1
Totals (4 entries)		4	4	4	12
