= Stefan Schöpf =

Austrian luger

Medal record

Luge

Representing Austria

European Championships
Silver medal – second place	1956 Imst	Men's doubles
Bronze medal – third place	1953 Cortina d'Ampezzo	Men's doubles

Stefan Schöpf is an Austrian luger who competed in the 1950s. He won two medals in the men's doubles event at the European Luge Championships with a silver in 1956 and a bronze in 1953. Luge is an alpine sport similar to Bobsledding.
