= 2021 FIL European Luge Championships =

Luge competition in Sigulda, Latvia

- Venue: Sigulda bobsleigh, luge, and skeleton track
- Location: Sigulda, Latvia
- Dates: 9–10 January

The 2021 FIL European Luge Championships were held from 9 to 10 January 2021 in Sigulda, Latvia. This was the fifth time Sigulda hosted the event.

== Schedule ==
Four events were held.

All times are local (UTC+2).

Date	Time	Events
9 January	11:30	1st run Men
9 January	13:05	2nd run Men
9 January	15:10	1st run Doubles
9 January	16:30	2nd run Doubles
10 January	10:30	1st run Women
10 January	11:55	2nd run Women
10 January	13:50	Team relay

== Medal summary ==
=== Medal table ===
* Host nation (Latvia)

Rank	Nation	Gold	Silver	Bronze	Total
1	Russia	2	0	1	3
2	Germany	1	3	1	5
3	Latvia*	1	1	1	3
4	Italy	0	0	1	1
Totals (4 entries)		4	4	4	12

=== Medalists ===
Event	Gold		Silver		Bronze	
Men's singles	Felix Loch; Germany	1:35.884	Johannes Ludwig; Germany	1:36.104	Dominik Fischnaller; Italy	1:36.171
Women's singles	Tatiana Ivanova; Russia	1:23.594	Natalie Geisenberger; Germany	1:23.646	Victoria Demchenko; Russia	1:23.755
Doubles	Latvia; Andris Šics; Juris Šics	1:23.610	Germany; Tobias Wendl; Tobias Arlt	1:23.639	Latvia; Mārtiņš Bots; Roberts Plūme	1:23.710
Team relay	Russia; Tatiana Ivanova; Semen Pavlichenko; Vsevolod Kashkin / Konstantin Korshunov	2:12.833	Latvia; Elīza Tiruma; Artūrs Dārznieks; Andris Šics / Juris Šics	2:13.000	Germany; Natalie Geisenberger; Felix Loch; Tobias Wendl / Tobias Arlt	2:13.022
