= FIL European Luge Championships 2018 =

The 2018 FIL European Luge Championships took place under the auspices of the International Luge Federation at Sigulda, Latvia from 27 to 28 January 2018. This was the fourth time Sigulda hosted the event.

== Schedule ==
Four events were held.

Date	Time	Events
27 January	09:40	Doubles first run
27 January	11:00	Doubles second run
27 January	12:20	Women first run
27 January	13:40	Women second run
28 January	09:15	Men first run
28 January	10:50	Men second run
28 January	14:50	Team relay

== Medalists ==
Event	Gold	Time	Silver	Time	Bronze	Time
Men's singles	Semen Pavlichenko; Russia	1:36.758	Felix Loch; Germany	1:36.769	Roman Repilov; Russia	1:36.870
Women's singles	Tatiana Ivanova; Russia	1:23.989	Natalie Geisenberger; Germany	1:24.076	Sandra Robatscher; Italy	1:24.360
Doubles	Toni Eggert/Sascha Benecken; Germany	1:23.364	Andris Šics/Juris Šics; Latvia	1:23.419	Tobias Wendl/Tobias Arlt; Germany	1:23.590
Team relay	Russia; Tatiana Ivanova; Semen Pavlichenko; Alexander Denisyev/Vladislav Antonov	2:13.428	Germany; Natalie Geisenberger; Felix Loch; Toni Eggert/Sascha Benecken	2:13.579	Latvia; Kendija Aparjode; Inārs Kivlenieks; Andris Šics/Juris Šics	2:13.607

== Medal table ==
Rank	Nation	Gold	Silver	Bronze	Total
1	Russia (RUS)	3	0	1	4
2	Germany (GER)	1	3	1	5
3	Latvia (LAT)	0	1	1	2
4	Italy (ITA)	0	0	1	1
Totals (4 entries)		4	4	4	12
