= 2020 FIL World Luge Championships – Team relay =

Team relay at the 2020 FIL World Luge Championships
- Venue: Sliding Center Sanki
- Location: Sochi, Russia
- Dates: 16 February
- Competitors: 44 from 11 nations
- Teams: 11
- Winning time: 2:44.213

Medalists
gold medal	Julia Taubitz; Johannes Ludwig; Toni Eggert / Sascha Benecken	Germany
silver medal	Kendija Aparjode; Kristers Aparjods; Andris Šics / Juris Šics	Latvia
bronze medal	Summer Britcher; Tucker West; Chris Mazdzer / Jayson Terdiman	United States

The Team relay competition at the 2020 FIL World Luge Championships was held on 16 February 2020.

== Results ==
The race was started at 18:06.

Rank	Bib	Country	Total	Diff
1st place, gold medalist(s)	10	Germany; Julia Taubitz; Johannes Ludwig; Toni Eggert / Sascha Benecken	2:44.213; TR	
2nd place, silver medalist(s)	9	Latvia; Kendija Aparjode; Kristers Aparjods; Andris Šics / Juris Šics	2:44.534	+0.321
3rd place, bronze medalist(s)	5	United States; Summer Britcher; Tucker West; Chris Mazdzer / Jayson Terdiman	2:44.557	+0.344
4	7	Italy; Andrea Vötter; Dominik Fischnaller; Emanuel Rieder / Simon Kainzwaldner	2:44.607	+0.394
5	8	Austria; Madeleine Egle; Jonas Müller; Yannick Müller / Armin Frauscher	2:45.223	+1.010
6	3	Slovakia; Katarína Šimoňáková; Jozef Ninis; Tomáš Vaverčák / Matej Zmij	2:46.297	+2.084
7	6	Poland; Klaudia Domaradzka; Mateusz Sochowicz; Wojciech Chmielewski / Jakub Kowalewski	2:46.872	+2.659
8	4	South Korea; Aileen Frisch; Lim Nam-kyu; Park Jin-yong / Cho Jung-myung	2:48.041	+3.828
9	1	Czech Republic; Michaela Maršíková; Michael Lejsek; Filip Vejdělek / Zdeněk Pěkný	2:50.345	+6.132
–	2	Kazakhstan; Tatiana Salnikova; Aleksandr Dmitriev; Andrey Shander / Semen Mikov	Disqualified	
–	11	Russia; Ekaterina Katnikova; Roman Repilov; Alexander Denisyev / Vladislav Antonov	Disqualified	
