= Walter Feist =

German luger (1907–1977)

Medal record

Luge

European Championships
Gold medal – first place	1929 Semmering	Men's doubles
Gold medal – first place	1934 Ilmenau	Men's doubles
Gold medal – first place	1935 Krynica	Men's doubles
Gold medal – first place	1938 Salzburg	Men's doubles
Gold medal – first place	1939 Reichenberg	Men's doubles
Silver medal – second place	1928 Schreiberhau	Men's doubles
Silver medal – second place	1937 Oslo	Men's doubles

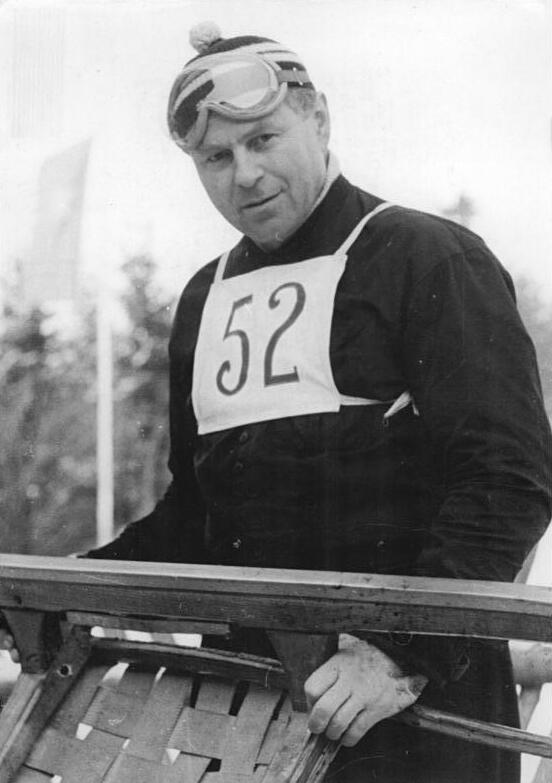
Walter Feist

Walter Feist (1907–1977) was a German luger who competed from the late 1920s to the late 1950s. He won seven medals in the men's doubles event at the European championships with five golds (1929, 1934, 1935, 1938, 1939) and two silvers (1928, 1937).
