= FIL European Luge Championships 2002 =

The FIL European Luge Championships 2002 took place in Altenberg, Germany.

== Medalists ==
Event	Gold		Silver		Bronze	
Men's singles	Markus Prock; Austria	1:49.610	Denis Geppert; Germany	1:49.720	Armin Zöggeler; Italy	1:49.891
Women's singles	Sylke Otto; Germany	1:46.871	Silke Kraushaar; Germany	1:47.630	Barbara Niedernhuber; Germany	1:47.762
Doubles	Germany; Patric Leitner; Alexander Resch	1:25.338	Austria; Tobias Schiegl; Markus Schiegl	1:25.346	Italy; Gerhard Plankensteiner; Oswald Haselrieder	1:25.444
Mixed team	Germany; Georg Hackl; Silke Kraushaar; Steffen Skel / Steffen Wöller		Germany; Denis Geppert; Sylke Otto; Patric Leitner / Alexander Resch		Austria; Markus Prock; Angelika Neuner; Tobias Schiegl / Markus Schiegl	

== Medal table ==
* Host nation (Germany)

Rank	Nation	Gold	Silver	Bronze	Total
1	Germany*	3	3	1	7
2	Austria	1	1	1	3
3	Italy	0	0	2	2
Totals (3 entries)		4	4	4	12
