= FIL European Luge Championships 1934 =

The FIL European Luge Championships 1934 took place in Ilmenau, Germany under the auspices of the Internationaler Schlittensportsverband (ISSV - International Sled Sports Federation in (in German)), a forerunner to the International Luge Federation.

== Men's singles ==
Medal	Athlete	Time
Gold	Martin Tietze (GER)	
Silver	Rudolf Maschke (TCH)	
Bronze	Alfred Posselt (TCH)	

== Women's singles ==
Medal	Athlete	Time
Gold	Hanni Fink (TCH)	
Silver	Adela Raimannová (TCH)	
Bronze	Gertrude Porsche-Schinkeová (TCH)	

== Men's doubles ==
Medal	Athlete	Time
Gold	Germany (Walter Feist, Walter Kluge)	
Silver	Czechoslovakia (Rudolf Hermann, Rudolf Maschke)	
Bronze	Czechoslovakia (Josef Heller, Albert Krauss)	

== Medal table ==
Rank	Nation	Gold	Silver	Bronze	Total
1	Germany (GER)	2	0	0	2
2	Czechoslovakia (TCH)	1	3	3	7
Totals (2 entries)		3	3	3	9
