= Rosa Lesser =

Austrian luger

Medal record

Luge

European Championships
Bronze medal – third place	1953 Cortina d'Ampezzo	Women's singles

Rosa Lesser was an Austrian luger who competed during the early 1950s. She won the bronze medal in the women's singles event at the 1953 European championships in Cortina d'Ampezzo, Italy.
