= Tatjana Hüfner =

German luger (born 1983)

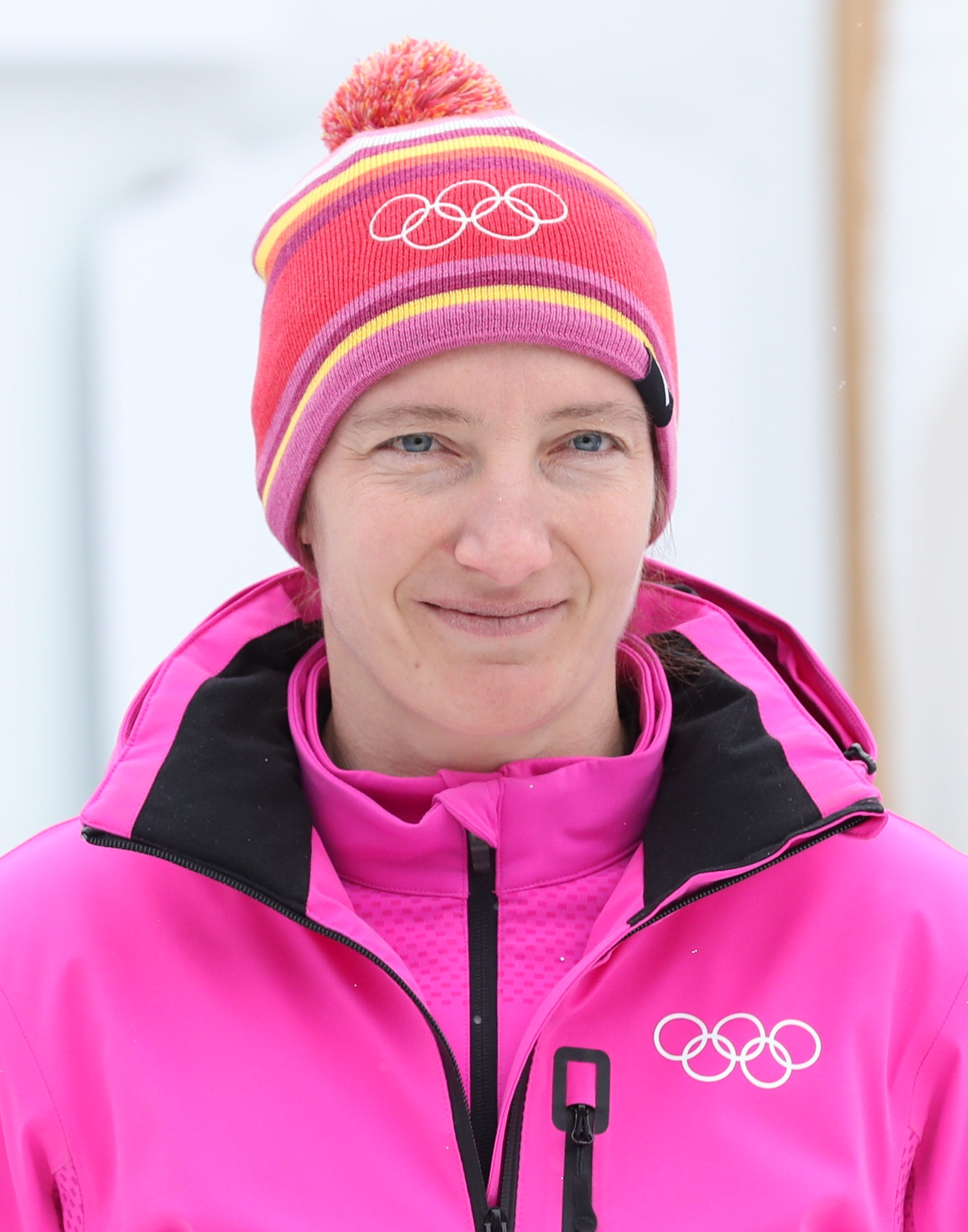
- Hüfner (2020)

Personal information
- Nationality: German
- Born: 30 April 1983 (age 43) Neuruppin, East Germany
- Height: 1.78 m (5 ft 10 in)
- Weight: 75 kg (165 lb)
- Website: http://www.tatjana-huefner.de/

Sport
- Country: Germany
- Sport: Luge
- Event: Singles
- Club: RC Blankenburg (1992–1997); WSC Erzgebirge Oberwiesenthal (1997–present)
- Turned pro: 2003
- Coached by: Bernhard Glass

Achievements and titles
- Personal best: 1st place, gold medalist(s) 2nd place, silver medalist(s) 3rd place, bronze medalist(s)
Medal record
Olympic Games
Gold medal – first place	2010 Vancouver	Singles
Silver medal – second place	2014 Sochi	Singles
Bronze medal – third place	2006 Turin	Singles
World Championships
Gold medal – first place	2007 Igls	Singles
Gold medal – first place	2008 Oberhof	Singles
Gold medal – first place	2008 Oberhof	Mixed team
Gold medal – first place	2011 Cesana	Singles
Gold medal – first place	2012 Altenberg	Singles
Gold medal – first place	2012 Altenberg	Mixed team
Gold medal – first place	2017 Igls	Singles
Gold medal – first place	2017 Igls	Mixed team
Silver medal – second place	2013 Whistler	Singles
Bronze medal – third place	2015 Sigulda	Singles
Bronze medal – third place	2017 Igls	Sprint
European Championships
Gold medal – first place	2016 Altenberg	Singles
Gold medal – first place	2016 Altenberg	Mixed team
Silver medal – second place	2004 Oberhof	Singles
Silver medal – second place	2006 Winterberg	Singles
Silver medal – second place	2012 Paramonovo	Singles
Silver medal – second place	2012 Paramonovo	Mixed team
Silver medal – second place	2013 Oberhof	Singles
Silver medal – second place	2019 Oberhof	Singles
Bronze medal – third place	2017 Königssee	Singles

Tatjana Hüfner (born 30 April 1983) is a German retired luger who has competed since 2003.

== Career ==
She won the bronze medal in the women's singles at the 2006 Winter Olympics in Turin and the gold medal at the 2010 Winter Olympics in Vancouver.

Hüfner won eight gold medals at the FIL World Luge Championships, winning five in the women's singles event (2007, 2008, 2011, 2012, 2017) and three in the mixed team event (2008, 2012, 2017).

She also won two silvers in the women's singles event at the FIL European Luge Championships (2004, 2006).

Hüfner won the overall Luge World Cup title in women's singles three times (2007–08, 2008–09, 2009–10).

On 2 February 2008 she became the first woman to win five straight FIL Luge World Cup events with her victory at the bobsleigh, luge, and skeleton track in Altenberg, Germany.
