= FIL European Luge Championships 1939 =

The FIL European Luge Championships 1939 took place in Reichenberg, Czechoslovakia (then under control of Nazi Germany, now Liberec, Czech Republic) for the second time under the auspices of the Fédération Internationale de Bobsleigh et de Tobogganing (FIBT - International Bobsleigh and Tobogganing Federation in (in French)) under their "Section de Luge", a trend that would continue until the International Luge Federation (FIL) was formed in 1957. Reichenberg hosted the first European championships in 1914. It would also mark the last time these championships would be held prior to the outbreak of World War II later that year.

== Men's singles ==
Medal	Athlete	Time
Gold	Fritz Preissler (TCH)	
Silver	Martin Tietze (GER)	
Bronze	Gustav Ježek (TCH)	

Preissler ended Tietze's reign of four straight championships in this event. Between 1928 and 1939, both men combined for seven championships victories in this event.

== Women's singles ==
Medal	Athlete	Time
Gold	Friedel Tietze (GER)	
Silver	Traudl Grassi (TCH)	
Bronze	Hanni Finková (TCH)	

== Men's doubles ==
Medal	Athlete	Time
Gold	Germany (Walter Feist, Walter Kluge)	
Silver	Germany (Viktor Schubert, Erhard Körner)	
Bronze	Czechoslovakia (Rudolf Hermann, Albert Krauss)	

== Medal table ==
Rank	Nation	Gold	Silver	Bronze	Total
1	Germany (GER)	2	2	0	4
2	Czechoslovakia (TCH)	1	1	3	5
Totals (2 entries)		3	3	3	9
