= Angelika Neuner =

Austrian luger (born 1969)

Medal record

Luge

Olympic Games
Silver medal – second place	1992 Albertville	Women's singles
Bronze medal – third place	1998 Nagano	Women's singles

World Championships
Gold medal – first place	1996 Altenberg	Mixed team
Gold medal – first place	1997 Igls	Mixed team
Silver medal – second place	1993 Calgary	Mixed team
Bronze medal – third place	1995 Lillehammer	Mixed team
Bronze medal – third place	1997 Igls	Women's singles
Bronze medal – third place	2000 St. Moritz	Mixed team

European Championships
Silver medal – second place	1992 Winterberg	Mixed team
Silver medal – second place	1996 Sigulda	Mixed team
Bronze medal – third place	1996 Sigulda	Women's singles
Bronze medal – third place	1998 Oberhof	Mixed team
Bronze medal – third place	2002 Altenberg	Mixed team

Angelika Neuner (born 23 December 1969) is an Austrian luger who competed from 1987 to 2002. Competing in four Winter Olympics, she won two medals in the women's singles event with a silver in 1992 and a bronze in 1998. Her younger sister, Doris, won the gold medal in the same event at Albertville in 1992.

Neuner also won six medals at the FIL World Luge Championships, including two gold (Mixed team: 1996, 1997), one silver (Mixed team: 1993), and three bronzes (Women's singles: 1997, Mixed team: 1995, 2000).

She won five medals at the FIL European Luge Championships, earning them in 1992 (silver: Mixed team), 1996 (silver: Mixed team, bronze: Women's singles), 1998 (bronze: Mixed team) and 2002 (bronze: Mixed team).

Neuner's best finish in the overall Luge World Cup was second in 1996–7.

She carried the Austrian flag during the opening ceremonies of the 2002 Winter Olympics in Salt Lake City.
