= Józef Pietrończyk =

Polish luger

Medal record

Luge

European Championships
Bronze medal – third place	1974 Imst	Men's doubles

Józef Pietrończyk was a Polish luger who competed in the mid-1970s. He and Roman Hurej won the bronze medal in the men's doubles event at the 1974 FIL European Luge Championships in Imst, Austria.
