= Hermann Mayregger =

Austrian luger

Medal record

Luge

European Championships
| Bronze medal – third place | 1951 Igls | Men's singles |

Hermann Mayregger was an Austrian who competed during the early 1950s. He won the bronze medal in the men's singles at the 1951 European luge championships in Igls, Austria.
