= Erhard Körner =

German luger

Medal record

Luge

Representing Germany

European Championships
Silver medal – second place	1939 Reichenberg	Men's doubles

Erhard Körner was a German luger who competed in the late 1930s. He won a silver medal in the men's doubles event at the 1939 European luge championships in Reichenberg, Czechoslovakia (now Liberec, Czech Republic).
