= Hermann Küppel =

German luger

Medal record

Luge

European Championships
Silver medal – second place	1955 Hahnenklee	Men's doubles

Hermann Küppel was a West German luger who competed in the mid-1950s. He won a silver medal in the men's doubles event at the 1955 European luge championships in Hahnenklee, West Germany.
