= Sandra Gasparini =

Italian luger

Medal record

Luge

Representing Italy

World Championships
Silver medal – second place	2007 Igls	Mixed team

European Championships
Silver medal – second place	2013 Oberhof	Mixed team
Bronze medal – third place	2008 Cesana	Mixed team
Bronze medal – third place	2012 Paramonovo	Mixed team
Bronze medal – third place	2014 Sigulda	Mixed team

Sandra Gasparini (born 28 November 1990 in Sterzing) is an Italian luger who has competed since 2006. She won the silver medal in the mixed team event at the 2007 FIL World Luge Championships in Igls, Austria.

Gaparini also won a bronze in the mixed team relay event at the 2008 FIL European Luge Championships in Cesana, Italy.

She competed at the 2010 Winter Olympics where she finished 20th.
