= Gustav Ježek =

Czech luger

Medal record

Luge

European Championships
| Bronze medal – third place | 1939 Reichenberg | Men's singles |

Gustav Ježek (1915–?) was a Czechoslovak luger who competed during the late 1930s. He won the bronze medal in the men's singles event at the 1939 European luge championships at Reichenberg, occupied Czechoslovakia (now Liberec, Czech Republic).
