= Johann Stangl =

Austrian luger

Medal record

Luge

European Championships
Bronze medal – third place	1955 Hahnenklee	Men's singles

Johann Stangl was an Austrian luger who competed during the 1950s. He won the bronze medal in the men's singles event at the 1955 European luge championships in Hahnenklee, West Germany.
