= Rosa Perz =

Austrian luger

Medal record

Luge

European Championships
Bronze medal – third place	1952 Garmisch-Partenkirchen	Women's singles

Rosa Perz was an Austrian luger who competed during the early 1950s. She won the bronze medal in the women's singles event at the 1952 European championships in Garmisch-Partenkirchen, West Germany.
