= Hermann Mayr (luger) =

German luger

Medal record

Luge

European Championships
| Bronze medal – third place | 1955 Hahnenklee | Men's doubles |

Hermann Mayr was a West German luger who competed in the mid-1950s. He won a bronze medal in the men's doubles event at the 1955 European luge championships in Hahnenklee, West Germany.
