= Hilde Strum =

Austrian luger

Medal record

Luge

European Championships
Silver medal – second place	1951 Igls	Women's singles

Hilde Strum was an Austrian luger who competed during the early 1950s. She won the silver medal in the women's singles event at the 1951 European luge championships in Igls, Austria.
