= Erika Schiller =

German luger

Medal record

Luge

European Championships
Silver medal – second place	1952 Garmisch-Partenkirchen	Women's singles

Erika Schiller was a West German luger who competed during the early 1950s. She won the silver medal in the women's singles event at the 1952 European championships in Garmisch-Partenkirchen, West Germany.
