= Rudolf Peyfuss =

Austrian luger

Medal record

Luge

European Championships
Gold medal – first place	1951 Igls	Men's doubles

Rudolf Peyfuss is an Austrian luger who competed in the early 1950s. He won a gold medal in the men's doubles event at the 1951 European luge championships in Igls, Austria.
