= FIL European Luge Championships 1952 =

The FIL European Luge Championships 1952 took place in Garmisch-Partenkirchen, West Germany under the auspices of the Fédération Internationale de Bobsleigh et de Tobogganing (FIBT - International Bobsleigh and Tobogganing Federation in (in French)) under their "Section de Luge", a trend that would continue until the International Luge Federation (FIL) was formed in 1957.

== Men's singles ==
Medal	Athlete	Time
Gold	Rudolf Maschke (FRG)	
Silver	Paul Aste (AUT)	
Bronze	Albert Krauss (AUT)	

Prior to World War II, both Maschke and Krauss competed for Czechoslovakia.

== Women's singles ==
Medal	Athlete	Time
Gold	Maria Isser (AUT)	
Silver	Erika Schiller (FRG)	
Bronze	Rosa Perz (AUT)	

== Men's doubles ==
Medal	Athlete	Time
Gold	Austria (Paul Aste, Heinrich Isser)	
Silver	Austria (Hans Krausner, Luis Schlögl)	
Bronze	Austria (Wilhelm Lache, Josef Isser)	

== Medal table ==
Rank	Nation	Gold	Silver	Bronze	Total
1	Austria (AUT)	2	2	3	7
2	West Germany (FRG)	1	1	0	2
Totals (2 entries)		3	3	3	9
