= Norbert Steixner =

Austrian luger

Medal record

Luge

European Championships
Bronze medal – third place	1951 Igls	Men's doubles

Norbert Steixner was an Austrian luger who competed in the early 1950s. He won a bronze medal in the men's doubles event at the 1951 European luge championships in Igls, Austria.
