= Albert Krauss =

Luger

Medal record

Luge

European Championships
Silver medal – second place	1955 Hahnenklee	Men's singles
Bronze medal – third place	1934 Ilmenau	Men's doubles
Bronze medal – third place	1937 Oslo	Men's doubles
Bronze medal – third place	1939 Reichenberg	Men's doubles
Bronze medal – third place	1952 Garmisch-Partenkirchen	Men's singles

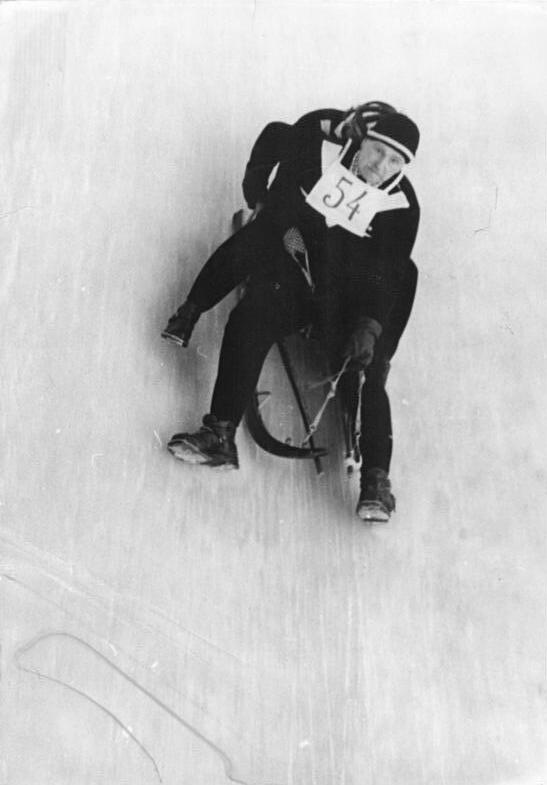
Albert Krauss, 1954

Albert Krauss (sometimes shown as Albert Kraus) was a luger who competed from the 1930s to the 1950s for three countries.

== Career ==
He won three bronze medals in the men's doubles for Czechoslovakia at the European luge championships (1934, 1937, 1939). After World War II, Krauss won a bronze medal in the men's singles event for Austria at the 1952 European luge championships in Garmisch-Partenkirchen, West Germany. Three years later, he won a silver medal in the same event for West Germany at the European championships in Hahnenklee.
