= FIL European Luge Championships 1951 =

The FIL European Luge Championships 1951 took place in Igls, Austria under the auspices of the Fédération Internationale de Bobsleigh et de Tobogganing (FIBT - International Bobsleigh and Tobogganing Federation in (in French)) under their "Section de Luge", a trend that would continue until the International Luge Federation (FIL) was formed in 1957. It marked the first time these championships would be held after the end of World War II in 1945. Host nation Austria made history by becoming the first nation to sweep the medals in all three events at these championships.

== Men's singles ==
Medal	Athlete	Time
Gold	Paul Aste (AUT)	
Silver	Wilhelm Lache (AUT)	
Bronze	Hermann Mayregger (AUT)	

== Women's singles ==
Medal	Athlete	Time
Gold	Karla Kienzl (AUT)	
Silver	Hilde Strum (AUT)	
Bronze	Maria Isser (AUT)	

== Men's doubles ==
Medal	Athlete	Time
Gold	Austria (Hans Krausner, Rudolf Peyfuss)	
Silver	Austria (Heinrich Isser, Josef Isser)	
Bronze	Austria (Norbert Steixner, Adolf Hofer)	

== Medal table ==
Rank	Nation	Gold	Silver	Bronze	Total
1	Austria (AUT)	3	3	3	9
Totals (1 entries)		3	3	3	9
