= FIL European Luge Championships 1974 =

The FIL European Luge Championships 1974 took place in Imst, Austria for the third time after previously hosting the event in 1956 and 1971.

== Men's singles ==
Medal	Athlete	Time
Gold	Hans Rinn (GDR)	
Silver	Manfred Schmid (AUT)	
Bronze	Rudolf Schmid (AUT)	

== Women's singles ==
Medal	Athlete	Time
Gold	Margit Schumann (GDR)	
Silver	Halina Kanasz (POL)	
Bronze	Ute Rührold (GDR)	

== Men's doubles ==
Medal	Athlete	Time
Gold	Italy (Paul Hildgartner, Walter Plaikner)	
Silver	East Germany (Hans Rinn, Norbert Hahn)	
Bronze	Poland (Roman Hurej, Józef Pietrończyk)	

== Medal table ==
Rank	Nation	Gold	Silver	Bronze	Total
1	East Germany (GDR)	2	1	1	4
2	Italy (ITA)	1	0	0	1
3	Austria (AUT)	0	1	1	2
3	Poland (POL)	0	1	1	2
Totals (4 entries)		3	3	3	9
