= Dietrich Schmidt (luger) =

German luger

Medal record

Luge

European Championships
| Silver medal – second place | 1955 Hahnenklee | Men's doubles |

Dietrich Schmidt was a West German luger who competed in the mid-1950s. He won a silver medal in the men's doubles event at the 1955 European luge championships in Hahnenklee, West Germany.
