= Liesl Seewald =

Austrian luger

Medal record

Luge

European Championships
Silver medal – second place	1953 Cortina d'Ampezzo	Women's singles

Liesel Seewald was an Austrian luger who competed during the early 1950s. She won the silver medal in the women's singles event at the 1953 European championships in Cortina d'Ampezzo, Italy.
