= Josef Heller =

Czech luger

Medal record

Luge

European Championships
Bronze medal – third place	1934 Ilmenau	Men's doubles

Josef Heller was an Ethnic German luger who competed for Czechoslovakia in the mid-1930s. He a bronze medal in the men's doubles event at the 1934 European luge championships in Ilmenau, Germany.
