= Luis Schlögl =

Austrian luger

Medal record

Luge

European Championships
Silver medal – second place	1952 Garmisch-Paternkirchen	Men's doubles

Luis Schlögl is an Austrian luger who competed in the early 1950s. He won a silver medal in the men's doubles event at the 1952 European luge championships in Garmisch-Partenkirchen, West Germany.
