= FIL European Luge Championships 1938 =

The FIL European Luge Championships 1938 took place in Salzburg, Austria under the auspices of the Fédération Internationale de Bobsleigh et de Tobogganing (FIBT - International Bobsleigh and Tobogganing Federation in (in French)) under their "Section de Luge", a trend that would continue until the International Luge Federation (FIL) was formed in 1957.

== Men's singles ==
Medal	Athlete	Time
Gold	Martin Tietze (GER)	
Silver	Walter Kluge (GER)	
Bronze	Rudolf Hermann (TCH)	

Tietze won his fourth straight championship in this event.

== Women's singles ==
Medal	Athlete	Time
Gold	Friedel Tietze (GER)	
Silver	Waltraut Grassl (TCH)	
Bronze	Hanni Finková (TCH)	

== Men's doubles ==
Medal	Athlete	Time
Gold	Germany (Walter Feist, Walter Kluge)	
Silver	Germany (Viktor Schubert, Werner Rüger)	
Bronze	Czechoslovakia (Rudolf Maschke, Erhard Grundmann)	

== Medal table ==
Rank	Nation	Gold	Silver	Bronze	Total
1	Germany (GER)	3	2	0	5
2	Czechoslovakia (TCH)	0	1	3	4
Totals (2 entries)		3	3	3	9
