= Paramonovo =

Paramonovo may refer to:

- Paramonovo, Moscow Oblast, a village in Moscow Oblast, Russia
- Paramonovo, Nizhny Novgorod Oblast, a village in Nizhny Novgorod Oblast, Russia
- Paramonovo, name of several other rural localities in Russia
- Paramonovo Formation is an Albian formation in Moscow Oblast, Russia.
