= 2021 FIL World Luge Championships – Doubles =

Doubles at the 2021 FIL World Luge Championships
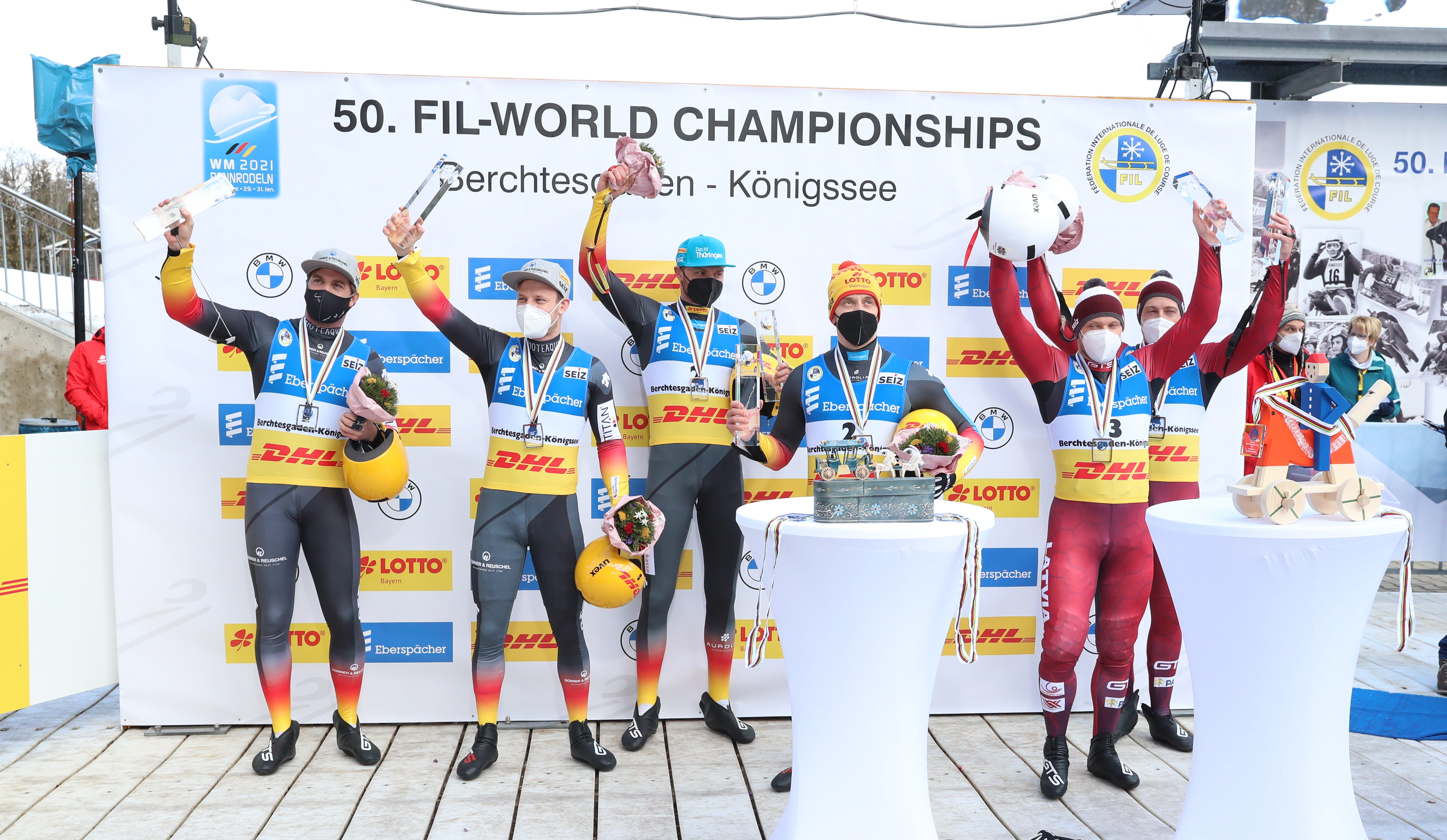
- Doubles at the FIL World Luge Championships Königssee 2021
- Venue: Königssee bobsleigh, luge, and skeleton track
- Location: Königssee, Germany
- Dates: 30 January
- Competitors: 50 from 13 nations
- Teams: 25
- Winning time: 1:39.931

Medalists
gold medal	Toni Eggert; Sascha Benecken	Germany
silver medal	Tobias Wendl; Tobias Arlt	Germany
bronze medal	Andris Šics; Juris Šics	Latvia

The Doubles competition at the 2021 FIL World Luge Championships was held on 30 January 2021.

== Results ==
The first run was held at 09:33 and the second run at 10:52.

Rank	Bib	Name	Country	Run 1	Rank	Run 2	Rank	Total	Diff
1st place, gold medalist(s)	2	Toni Eggert; Sascha Benecken	Germany	49.829	1	50.102	1	1:39.931	
2nd place, silver medalist(s)	1	Tobias Wendl; Tobias Arlt	Germany	49.831	2	50.255	2	1:40.086	+0.155
3rd place, bronze medalist(s)	3	Andris Šics; Juris Šics	Latvia	50.168	3	50.423	3	1:40.591	+0.660
4	11	Emanuel Rieder; Simon Kainzwaldner	Italy	50.275	7	50.497	5	1:40.772	+0.841
5	12	Ivan Nagler; Fabian Malleier	Italy	50.267	5	50.519	6	1:40.786	+0.855
6	4	Thomas Steu; Lorenz Koller	Austria	50.356	9	50.432	4	1:40.788	+0.857
7	6	Ludwig Rieder; Patrick Rastner	Italy	50.219	4	50.570	7	1:40.789	+0.858
8	9	Wojciech Chmielewski; Jakub Kowalewski	Poland	50.291	8	50.575	8	1:40.866	+0.935
9	8	Oskars Gudramovičs; Pēteris Kalniņš	Latvia	50.268	6	50.618	9	1:40.886	+0.955
10	14	Hannes Orlamünder; Paul Gubitz	Germany	50.465	10	50.657	11	1:41.122	+1.191
11	7	Yannick Müller; Armin Frauscher	Austria	50.545	11	50.856	15	1:41.401	+1.470
12	5	Mārtiņš Bots; Roberts Plūme	Latvia	50.807	15	50.701	12	1:41.508	+1.573
13	16	Alexander Denisyev; Vladislav Antonov	Russian Luge Federation	50.797	14	50.778	13	1:41.575	+1.644
14	17	Tomáš Vaverčák; Matej Zmij	Slovakia	50.992	17	50.637	10	1:41.629	+1.698
15	13	Dmitry Buchnev; Daniil Kilseev	Russian Luge Federation	50.881	16	50.822	14	1:41.703	+1.772
16	15	Chris Mazdzer; Jayson Terdiman	United States	50.779	13	51.037	16	1:41.816	+1.885
17	20	Park Jin-yong; Cho Jung-myung	South Korea	51.382	18	51.317	17	1:42.699	+2.768
18	18	Juri Gatt; Riccardo Schöpf	Austria	51.454	19	Did not advance			
19	19	Ihor Stakhiv; Andrii Lysetskyi	Ukraine	51.654	20	Did not advance			
20	23	Ionuț Șișcanu; Iulian Oprea	Moldova	53.453	21	Did not advance			
	22	Vasile Gîtlan; Darius Şerban	Romania	Did not finish		Did not advance			
	24	Ihor Hoi; Rostyslav Levkovych	Ukraine	Did not finish		Did not advance			
	25	Mircea Turea; Sebastian Motzca	Romania	Did not finish		Did not advance			
	26	Jakub Karaś; Mateusz Karaś	Poland	Did not start		Did not advance			
	10	Vsevolod Kashkin; Konstantin Korshunov	Russian Luge Federation	Disqualified		Did not advance			
	21	Tristan Walker; Justin Snith	Canada	50.553	12	Did not finish			
