= 2021 FIL World Luge Championships – Doubles' sprint =

Doubles' sprint at the 2021 FIL World Luge Championships
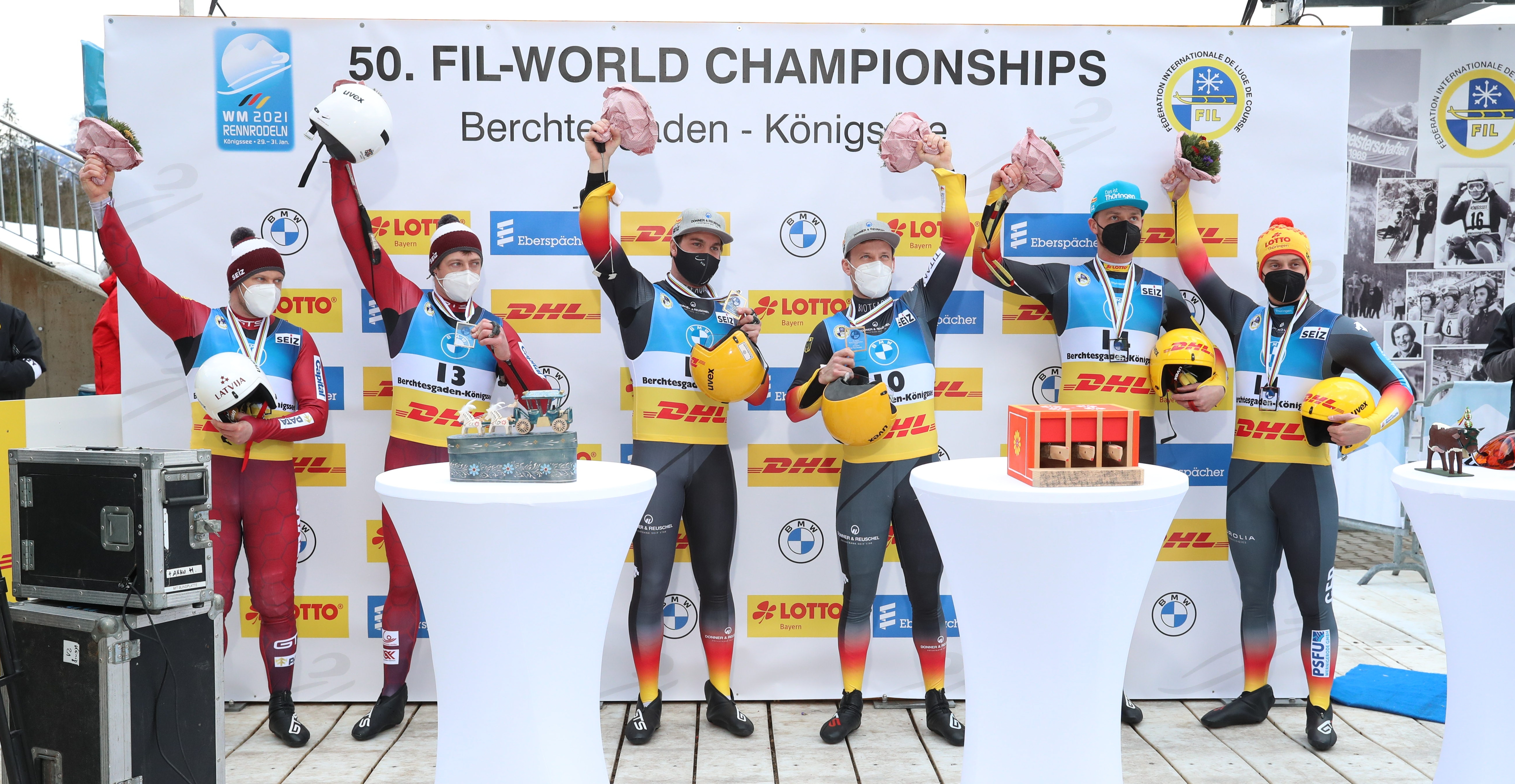
- Doubles Sprint at the FIL World Luge Championships Königssee 2021 by Sandro Halank
- Venue: Königssee bobsleigh, luge, and skeleton track
- Location: Königssee, Germany
- Dates: 29 January
- Competitors: 50 from 13 nations
- Teams: 25
- Winning time: 39.126

Medalists
gold medal	Tobias Wendl; Tobias Arlt	Germany
silver medal	Andris Šics; Juris Šics	Latvia
bronze medal	Toni Eggert; Sascha Benecken	Germany

The doubles' sprint competition at the 2021 FIL World Luge Championships was held on 29 January 2021.

== Results ==
The qualification was held at 10:16 and the final at 13:41.

Rank	Bib	Name	Country	Qualification		Final	
Rank	Bib	Name	Country	Time	Rank	Time	Diff
1st place, gold medalist(s)	12	Tobias Wendl; Tobias Arlt	Germany	39.565	6	39.126	
2nd place, silver medalist(s)	13	Andris Šics; Juris Šics	Latvia	39.391	3	39.140	+0.014
3rd place, bronze medalist(s)	14	Toni Eggert; Sascha Benecken	Germany	39.266	2	39.161	+0.035
4	15	Thomas Steu; Lorenz Koller	Austria	39.233	1	39.225	+0.099
5	2	Hannes Orlamünder; Paul Gubitz	Germany	39.760	11	39.240	+0.114
6	8	Oskars Gudramovičs; Pēteris Kalniņš	Latvia	39.463	5	39.256	+0.130
7	9	Emanuel Rieder; Simon Kainzwaldner	Italy	39.450	4	39.320	+0.194
8	3	Wojciech Chmielewski; Jakub Kowalewski	Poland	39.792	12	39.362	+0.236
9	21	Tristan Walker; Justin Snith	Canada	39.887	13	39.368	+0.242
10	7	Ivan Nagler; Fabian Malleier	Italy	39.670	7	39.397	+0.271
11	6	Mārtiņš Bots; Roberts Plūme	Latvia	39.913	15	39.420	+0.294
12	5	Vsevolod Kashkin; Konstantin Korshunov	Russian Luge Federation	39.693	8	39.485	+0.359
13	25	Dmitry Buchnev; Daniil Kilseev	Russian Luge Federation	39.897	14	39.487	+0.361
14	4	Alexander Denisyev; Vladislav Antonov	Russian Luge Federation	39.731	9	39.669	+0.543
15	10	Yannick Müller; Armin Frauscher	Austria	39.748	10	39.899	+0.773
16	22	Chris Mazdzer; Jayson Terdiman	United States	39.985	16	Did not advance	
17	1	Park Jin-yong; Cho Jung-myung	South Korea	40.197	17	Did not advance	
18	11	Ludwig Rieder; Patrick Rastner	Italy	40.230	18	Did not advance	
19	18	Juri Gatt; Riccardo Schöpf	Austria	40.260	19	Did not advance	
20	17	Tomáš Vaverčák; Matej Zmij	Slovakia	40.306	20	Did not advance	
21	16	Ihor Stakhiv; Andrii Lysetskyi	Ukraine	40.505	21	Did not advance	
22	20	Ihor Hoi; Rostyslav Levkovych	Ukraine	41.120	22	Did not advance	
23	24	Vasile Gîtlan; Darius Şerban	Romania	41.280	23	Did not advance	
24	23	Mircea Turea; Sebastian Motzca	Romania	41.286	24	Did not advance	
25	19	Ionuț Șișcanu; Iulian Oprea	Moldova	41.740	25	Did not advance	
	26	Jakub Karaś; Mateusz Karaś	Poland	Did not start		Did not advance	
