= 2023 FIL European Luge Championships – Men's doubles =

Men's doubles at the 2023 FIL European Luge Championships
- Venue: Sigulda bobsleigh, luge, and skeleton track
- Location: Sigulda, Latvia
- Dates: 14 January
- Competitors: 28 from 8 nations
- Teams: 14
- Winning time: 1:24.022

Medalists
gold medal	Tobias Wendl; Tobias Arlt	Germany
silver medal	Mārtiņš Bots; Roberts Plūme	Latvia
bronze medal	Eduards Ševics-Mikeļševics; Lūkass Krasts	Latvia

The men's doubles competition at the 2023 FIL European Luge Championships was held on 14 January 2023.

== Results ==
The first run was held at 10:06 and the second run at 11:30.

Rank	Bib	Name	Country	Run 1	Rank	Run 2	Rank	Total	Diff
1st place, gold medalist(s)	18	Tobias Wendl; Tobias Arlt	Germany	42.173	3	41.849	1	1:24.022	
2nd place, silver medalist(s)	16	Mārtiņš Bots; Roberts Plūme	Latvia	42.138	1	41.946	4	1:24.084	+0.062
3rd place, bronze medalist(s)	9	Eduards Ševics-Mikeļševics; Lūkass Krasts	Latvia	42.147	2	41.964	5	1:24.111	+0.089
4	15	Juri Gatt; Riccardo Schöpf	Austria	42.317	6	41.899	2	1:24.216	+0.194
5	17	Toni Eggert; Sascha Benecken	Germany	42.347	7	41.944	3	1:24.291	+0.269
6	12	Emanuel Rieder; Simon Kainzwaldner	Italy	42.311	5	42.044	7	1:24.355	+0.333
7	7	Thomas Steu; Lorenz Koller	Austria	42.205	4	42.151	9	1:24.356	+0.334
8	5	Yannick Müller; Armin Frauscher	Austria	42.532	9	42.018	6	1:24.550	+0.528
9	10	Ludwig Rieder; Patrick Rastner	Italy	42.522	8	42.142	8	1:24.664	+0.642
10	3	Ihor Hoi; Myroslav Levkovych	Ukraine	42.936	10	42.856	13	1:25.792	+1.770
11	11	Wojciech Chmielewski; Jakub Kowalewski	Poland	43.694	12	42.396	10	1:26.090	+2.068
12	2	Filip Vejdělek; Zdeněk Pěkný	Czech Republic	43.289	11	42.833	12	1:24.550	+0.528
13	13	Hannes Orlamünder; Paul Gubitz	Germany	44.752	13	42.481	11	1:27.233	+3.211
14	4	Tomáš Vaverčák; Matej Zmij	Slovakia	1:10.285	14	42.946	14	1:53.231	+29.209
