= 2020–21 Luge World Cup =

2020–2021 season of the Luge World Cup

Winners
- Men's singles Overall: (Germany) Felix Loch (7)
- Men's singles: (Germany) Felix Loch (1)
- Men's sprint: (Italy) Kevin Fischnaller (1) & (Germany) Felix Loch (2)
- Doubles Overall: (Austria) Thomas Steu / Lorenz Koller (1)
- Doubles: (Austria) Thomas Steu / Lorenz Koller (1)
- Doubles sprint: (Austria) Thomas Steu / Lorenz Koller (1)
- Women's singles Overall: (Germany) Natalie Geisenberger (8)
- Women's singles: (Germany) Natalie Geisenberger (1)
- Women's sprint: (Germany) Julia Taubitz (2)
- Team relay: Germany (15)

Competitions
- Venues: 9/9 events

The 2020–21 Luge World Cup was a multi race tournament over a season for Luge, organised by the FIL. The season started 28 November 2020 in Innsbruck, Austria, and concluded on 6 February 2021 in St. Moritz, Switzerland.

== Calendar ==
Venue	Date	Details
(Austria) Innsbruck	28–29 November	Sprint and Team Relay
(Germany) Altenberg	5–6 December	Team Relay
(Germany) Oberhof	12–13 December	Team Relay
(Germany) Winterberg	19–20 December	Sprint
(Germany) Königssee	2–3 January	Team Relay
(Latvia) Sigulda	9–10 January	Team Relay/FIL European Championships
(Germany) Oberhof	16–17 January	
(Austria) Innsbruck	23–24 January	Sprint
(Germany) Königssee	29–31 January	World Championships (Doesn't count toward to the World Cup standings)
(Switzerland) St. Moritz	6–7 February	Team Relay cancelled due to heavy snowfall

== Results ==
=== Men's singles ===
Event:	Gold:	Time	Silver:	Time	Bronze:	Time
Innsbruck	(Germany) Felix Loch	1:39.941 (50.056 / 49.885)	(Germany) Johannes Ludwig	1:40.067 (50.115 / 49.952)	(Italy) Dominik Fischnaller	1:40.121 (50.071 / 50.050)
Innsbruck (Sprint)	(Germany) Felix Loch	32.623	(Austria) David Gleirscher	32.711	(Austria) Jonas Müller	32.714
Altenberg	(Germany) Felix Loch	1:50.395 (55.655 / 54.740)	(Germany) Max Langenhan	1:50.698 (55.603 / 55.095)	(Latvia) Kristers Aparjods	1:50.701 (55.528 / 55.173)
Oberhof	(Germany) Felix Loch	1:26.745 (43.455 / 43.290)	(Germany) Johannes Ludwig	1:26.841 (43.416 / 43.425)	(Austria) Jonas Müller	1:26.990 (43.425 / 43.565)
Winterberg	(Germany) Felix Loch	1:43.861 (51.987 / 51.874)	(Austria) Nico Gleirscher	1:44.059 (52.016 / 52.043)	(Italy) Dominik Fischnaller	1:44.063 (52.137 / 51.926)
Winterberg (Sprint)	(Germany) Max Langenhan	36.331	(Italy) Kevin Fischnaller	36.389	(Italy) Dominik Fischnaller	36.403
Königssee	(Germany) Felix Loch	1:38.218 (49.061 / 49.157)	(Russia) Roman Repilov	1:38.503 (49.200 / 49.303)	(Germany) Johannes Ludwig	1:38.919 (49.376 / 49.543)
Sigulda	(Germany) Felix Loch	1:35.884 (48.025 / 47.859)	(Germany) Johannes Ludwig	1:36.104 (48.069 / 48.035)	(Italy) Dominik Fischnaller	1:36.171 (48.114 / 48.057)
Oberhof	(Germany) Felix Loch	1:25.380 (42.673 / 42.707)	(Austria) Jonas Müller	1:25.627 (42.855 / 42.772)	(Austria) David Gleirscher	1:25.823 (42.957 / 42.866)
Innsbruck	(Germany) Felix Loch	1:39.771 (49.952 / 49.819)	(Russia) Semen Pavlichenko	1:39.777 (49.891 / 49.886)	(Germany) Johannes Ludwig	1:39.987 (50.001 / 49.986)
Innsbruck (Sprint)	(Russia) Semen Pavlichenko	32.341	(Italy) Kevin Fischnaller	32.421	(Germany) Felix Loch	32.428
St. Moritz	(Austria) Nico Gleirscher	2:15.852 (1:07.545 / 1:08.307)	(Germany) Max Langenhan	2:15.912 (1:07.860 / 1:08.052)	(Germany) Felix Loch	2:15.926 (1:07.812 / 1:08.114)

=== Women's singles ===
Event:	Gold:	Time	Silver:	Time	Bronze:	Time
Innsbruck	(Germany) Julia Taubitz	1:20.289 (40.177 / 40.112)	(Germany) Natalie Geisenberger	1:20.409 (40.262 / 40.147)	(Germany) Dajana Eitberger	1:20.559 (40.333 / 40.226)
Innsbruck (Sprint)	(Germany) Julia Taubitz	30.138	(Germany) Natalie Geisenberger	30.205	(Germany) Dajana Eitberger	30.316
Altenberg	(Russia) Tatiana Ivanova	1:45.170 (52.539 / 52.631)	(Germany) Natalie Geisenberger	1:45.283 (52.586 / 52.697)	(Russia) Ekaterina Katnikova	1:45.370 (52.741 / 52.629)
Oberhof	(Germany) Dajana Eitberger	1:23.338 (41.672 / 41.666)	(Germany) Natalie Geisenberger	1:23.410 (41.767 / 41.643)	(Latvia) Kendija Aparjode	1:23.507 (41.667 / 41.840)
Winterberg	(Germany) Julia Taubitz	1:52.462 (56.245 / 56.217)	(Germany) Natalie Geisenberger	1:52.568 (56.170 / 56.398)	(Latvia) Elīza Tiruma	1:52.728 (56.428 / 56.300)
Winterberg (Sprint)	(Germany) Julia Taubitz	38.782	(Germany) Natalie Geisenberger	38.956	(Germany) Dajana Eitberger	38.971
Königssee	(Germany) Julia Taubitz	1:41.402 (50.730 / 50.672)	(Germany) Natalie Geisenberger	1:41.712 (50.839 / 50.873)	(Austria) Madeleine Egle	1:41.770 (50.850 / 50.920)
Sigulda	(Russia) Tatiana Ivanova	1:23.594 (41.834 / 41.760)	(Germany) Natalie Geisenberger	1:23.646 (41.829 / 41.817)	(Russia) Victoria Demchenko	1:23.755 (41.882 / 41.873)
Oberhof	(Germany) Natalie Geisenberger	1:22.121 (41.112 / 41.009)	(Austria) Madeleine Egle	1:22.349 (41.147 / 41.202)	(Germany) Anna Berreiter	1:22.357 (41.227 / 41.130)
Innsbruck	(Germany) Natalie Geisenberger	1:19.728 (39.903 / 39.825)	(Germany) Julia Taubitz	1:19.810 (39.955 / 39.855)	(United States) Summer Britcher	1:20.014 (40.075 / 39.939)
Innsbruck (Sprint)	(Germany) Julia Taubitz	30.041	(Germany) Natalie Geisenberger	30.070	(Germany) Dajana Eitberger	30.132
St. Moritz	(Latvia) Elīna leva Vītola	1:53.618 (57.094 / 56.524)	(Germany) Julia Taubitz	1:53.870 (57.486 / 56.384)	(Switzerland) Natalie Maag	1:53.897 (57.065 / 56.832)

=== Doubles ===
Event:	Gold:	Time	Silver:	Time	Bronze:	Time
Innsbruck	Thomas Steu; Lorenz Koller; Austria	1:19.253 (39.615 / 39.638)	Yannick Müller; Armin Frauscher; Austria	1:19.478 (39.785 / 39.693)	Toni Eggert; Sascha Benecken; Germany	1:19.533 (39.741 / 39.792)
Innsbruck (Sprint)	Thomas Steu; Lorenz Koller; Austria	30.118	Andris Šics; Juris Šics; Latvia	30.209	Ludwig Rieder; Patrick Rastner; Italy	30.220
Altenberg	Thomas Steu; Lorenz Koller; Austria	1:23.612 (41.788 / 41.824)	Toni Eggert; Sascha Benecken; Germany	1:23.620 (41.780 / 41.840)	Tobias Wendl; Tobias Arlt; Germany	1:23.631 (41.828 / 41.803)
Oberhof	Toni Eggert; Sascha Benecken; Germany	1:22.881 (41.374 / 41.507)	Thomas Steu; Lorenz Koller; Austria	1:23.036 (41.498 / 41.538)	Yannick Müller; Armin Frauscher; Austria	1:23.077 (41.432 / 41.645)
Winterberg	Tobias Wendl; Tobias Arlt; Germany	1:26.962 (43.464 / 43.498)	Toni Eggert; Sascha Benecken; Germany	1:27.002 (43.536 / 43.466)	Andris Šics; Juris Šics; Latvia	1:27.204 (43.693 / 43.511)
Winterberg (Sprint)	Toni Eggert; Sascha Benecken; Germany	30.972	Thomas Steu; Lorenz Koller; Austria	31.025	Tobias Wendl; Tobias Arlt; Germany	31.081
Königssee	Toni Eggert; Sascha Benecken; Germany	1:40.284 (50.118 / 50.166)	Tobias Wendl; Tobias Arlt; Germany	1:40.425 (50.092 / 50.333)	Thomas Steu; Lorenz Koller; Austria	1:40.754 (50.277 / 50.477)
Sigulda	Andris Šics; Juris Šics; Latvia	1:23.610 (41.779 / 41.831)	Tobias Wendl; Tobias Arlt; Germany	1:23.639 (41.814 / 41.825)	Mārtiņš Bots; Roberts Plūme; Latvia	1:23.710 (41.863 / 41.847)
Oberhof	Thomas Steu; Lorenz Koller; Austria	1:21.682 (40.890 / 40.792)	Tobias Wendl; Tobias Arlt; Germany	1:21.691 (40.817 / 40.874)	Andris Šics; Juris Šics; Latvia	1:21.698 (40.828 / 40.870)
Innsbruck	Ludwig Rieder; Patrick Rastner; Italy	1:19.436 (39.677 / 39.759)	Andris Šics; Juris Šics; Latvia	1:19.517 (39.800 / 39.717)	Thomas Steu; Lorenz Koller; Austria	1:19.520 (39.756 / 39.764)
Innsbruck (Sprint)	Andris Šics; Juris Šics; Latvia	29.958	Thomas Steu; Lorenz Koller; Austria	29.959	Toni Eggert; Sascha Benecken; Germany	29.969
St. Moritz	Mārtiņš Bots; Roberts Plūme; Latvia	1:48.274 (54.050 / 54.224)	Andris Šics; Juris Šics; Latvia	1:48.338 (54.170 / 54.168)	Ludwig Rieder; Patrick Rastner; Italy	1:48.481 (54.148 / 54.333)

=== Team relay ===
Event:	Gold:	Time	Silver:	Time	Bronze:	Time
Innsbruck	Germany; Julia Taubitz; Felix Loch; Toni Eggert/Sascha Benecken	2:09.742 (41.668 / 1:25.503)	Austria; Madeleine Egle; Jonas Müller; Thomas Steu/Lorenz Koller	2:09.772 (41.926 / 1:25.757)	Russia; Ekaterina Katnikova; Semen Pavlichenko; Vsevolod Kashkin/Konstantin Korshunov	2:09.863 (41.769 / 1:25.589)
Altenberg	Italy; Andrea Vötter; Kevin Fischnaller; Ludwig Rieder/Patrick Rastner	2:25.794 (47.587 / 1:36.404)	Russia; Tatiana Ivanova; Semen Pavlichenko; Alexander Denisyev/Vladislav Antonov	2:26.024 (47.612 / 1:36.404)	Latvia; Kendija Aparjode; Kristers Aparjods; Andris Šics/Juris Šics	2:26.378 (47.615 / 1:36.239)
Oberhof	Germany; Dajana Eitberger; Felix Loch; Toni Eggert/Sascha Benecken	2:23.648 (46.604 / 1:34.869)	Austria; Madeleine Egle; Jonas Müller; Thomas Steu/Lorenz Koller	2:23.684 (46.546 / 1:34.827)	Poland; Klaudia Domaradzka; Mateusz Sochowicz; Wojclech Jerzy Chmielewski/Jakub Kowalewski	2:24.766 (47.024 / 1:35.626)
Königssee	Austria; Madeleine Egle; Nico Gleirscher; Thomas Steu/Lorenz Koller	2:42.729 (53.089 / 1:47.596)	Germany; Julia Taubitz; Felix Loch; Toni Eggert/Sascha Benecken	2:42.922 (52.988 / 1:47.795)	Russia; Victoria Demchenko; Roman Repilov; Vsevolod Kashkin/Konstantin Korshunov	2:43.533 (53.371 / 1:47.972)
Sigulda	Russia; Tatiana Ivanova; Semen Pavlichenko; Vsevolod Kashkin/Konstantin Korshunov	2:12.833 (43.103 / 1:27.632)	Latvia; Elīza Tiruma; Artūrs Dārznieks; Andris Šics/Juris Šics	2:13.000 (43.295 / 1:28.040)	Germany; Natalie Geisenberger; Felix Loch; Tobias Wendl/Tobias Arlt	2:13.022 (43.406 / 1:28.004)
St. Moritz	cancelled due to heavy snowfall					

== Standings ==
=== Men's singles Overall ===
Pos.	Luger	Points
1.	Felix Loch (GER)	1095
2.	Johannes Ludwig (GER)	716
3.	Semen Pavlichenko (RUS)	673
4.	Max Langenhan (GER)	637
5.	Dominik Fischnaller (ITA)	623
6.	Nico Gleirscher (AUT)	598
7.	Kevin Fischnaller (ITA)	566
8.	Roman Repilov (RUS)*	556
9.	David Gleirscher (AUT)	500
10.	Jonas Müller (AUT)	475

- Final standings after 12 events
- (*Champion 2020)

=== Men's singles ===
Pos.	Luger	Points
1.	Felix Loch (GER)	870
2.	Johannes Ludwig (GER)	581
3.	Nico Gleirscher (AUT)	488
4.	Semen Pavlichenko (RUS)	467
5.	Max Langenhan (GER)	448
5.	Roman Repilov (RUS)	448
7.	Dominik Fischnaller (ITA)	443
8.	Jonas Müller (AUT)	373
9.	Wolfgang Kindl (AUT)	342
10.	Kevin Fischnaller (ITA)	341

- Final standings after 9 events

=== Men's singles Sprint ===
Pos.	Luger	Points
1.	Kevin Fischnaller (ITA)	225
1.	Felix Loch (GER)	225
3.	Semen Pavlichenko (RUS)	206
4.	Max Langenhan (GER)	189
5.	David Gleirscher (AUT)	184
6.	Dominik Fischnaller (ITA)	180
7.	Johannes Ludwig (GER)	135
8.	Wolfgang Kindl (AUT)	115
9.	Nico Gleirscher (AUT)	110
10.	Roman Repilov (RUS)*	108

- Final standings after 3 events
- (*Champion 2020)

=== Women's singles Overall ===
Pos.	Luger	Points
1.	Natalie Geisenberger (GER)	995
2.	Julia Taubitz (GER)*	976
3.	Dajana Eitberger (GER)	698
4.	Madeleine Egle (AUT)	648
5.	Tatiana Ivanova (RUS)	579
6.	Elīza Tiruma (LAT)	525
7.	Ekaterina Katnikova (RUS)	512
8.	Andrea Vötter (ITA)	458
9.	Kendija Aparjode (LAT)	447
10.	Victoria Demchenko (RUS)	398

- Final standings after 12 events
- (*Champion 2020)

=== Women's singles ===
Pos.	Luger	Points
1.	Natalie Geisenberger (GER)	740
2.	Julia Taubitz (GER)	676
3.	Madeleine Egle (AUT)	501
4.	Dajana Eitberger (GER)	488
5.	Tatiana Ivanova (RUS)	480
6.	Ekaterina Katnikova (RUS)	380
7.	Elīza Tiruma (LAT)	379
8.	Andrea Vötter (ITA)	351
9.	Victoria Demchenko (RUS)	344
10.	Kendija Aparjode (LAT)	339

- Final standings after 9 events

=== Women's singles Sprint ===
Pos.	Luger	Points
1.	Julia Taubitz (GER)*	300
2.	Natalie Geisenberger (GER)	255
3.	Dajana Eitberger (GER)	210
4.	Madeleine Egle (AUT)	147
5.	Elīza Tiruma (LAT)	146
6.	Ekaterina Katnikova (RUS)	132
7.	Hannah Prock (AUT)	110
8.	Kendija Aparjode (LAT)	108
9.	Andrea Vötter (ITA)	107
10.	Tatiana Ivanova (RUS)	99

- Final standings after 3 events
- (*Champion 2020)

=== Doubles Overall ===
Pos.	Team	Points
1.	Thomas Steu / Lorenz Koller (AUT)	942
2.	Andris Šics / Juris Šics (LAT)	834
3.	Toni Eggert / Sascha Benecken (GER)*	830
4.	Tobias Wendl / Tobias Arlt (GER)	773
5.	Ludwig Rieder / Patrick Rastner (ITA)	707
6.	Yannick Müller / Armin Frauscher (AUT)	574
7.	Emanuel Rieder / Simon Kainzwaldner (ITA)	541
8.	Mārtiņš Bots / Roberts Plūme (LAT)	516
9.	Ivan Nagler / Fabian Malleier (ITA)	483
10.	Oskars Gudramovičs / Pēteris Kalniņš (LAT)	479

- Final standings after 12 events
- (*Champion 2020)

=== Doubles ===
Pos.	Team	Points
1.	Thomas Steu / Lorenz Koller (AUT)	672
2.	Toni Eggert / Sascha Benecken (GER)	634
3.	Andris Šics / Juris Šics (LAT)	603
4.	Tobias Wendl / Tobias Arlt (GER)	602
5.	Ludwig Rieder / Patrick Rastner (ITA)	527
6.	Yannick Müller / Armin Frauscher (AUT)	450
7.	Mārtiņš Bots / Roberts Plūme (LAT)	397
8.	Emanuel Rieder / Simon Kainzwaldner (ITA)	385
9.	Ivan Nagler / Fabian Malleier (ITA)	371
10.	Oskars Gudramovičs / Pēteris Kalniņš (LAT)	352

- Final standings after 9 events

=== Doubles Sprint ===
Pos.	Team	Points
1.	Thomas Steu / Lorenz Koller (AUT)	270
2.	Andris Šics / Juris Šics (LAT)*	231
3.	Toni Eggert / Sascha Benecken (GER)	196
4.	Ludwig Rieder / Patrick Rastner (ITA)	180
5.	Tobias Wendl / Tobias Arlt (GER)	171
6.	Emanuel Rieder / Simon Kainzwaldner (ITA)	156
7.	Oskars Gudramovičs / Pēteris Kalniņš (LAT)	127
8.	Yannick Müller / Armin Frauscher (AUT)	124
9.	Mārtiņš Bots / Roberts Plūme (LAT)	119
10.	Ivan Nagler / Fabian Malleier (ITA)	112

- Final standings after 3 events
- (*Champion 2020)

=== Team Relay ===
Pos.	Luger	Points
1.	Germany	415
2.	Russia*	375
3.	Latvia	330
4.	Austria	325
5.	Italy*	275
6.	Ukraine	225
7.	Poland	204
8.	Slovakia	202
9.	South Korea	162
10.	Romania	80

- Final standings after 5 events
- (*Champions 2020)

== Medal table ==
Rank	Nation	Gold	Silver	Bronze	Total
1	Germany	25	22	14	61
2	Austria	6	10	7	23
3	Latvia	4	4	7	15
4	Russia	4	3	4	11
5	Italy	2	2	6	10
6	Poland	0	0	1	1
6	Switzerland	0	0	1	1
6	United States	0	0	1	1
Totals (8 entries)		41	41	41	123

== Points ==
Place	1	2	3	4	5	6	7	8	9	10	11	12	13	14	15	16	17	18	19	20
Individual	100	85	70	60	55	50	46	42	39	36	34	32	30	28	26	25	24	23	22	21
