= 2020 FIL World Luge Championships – Doubles =

Doubles at the 2020 FIL World Luge Championships
- Venue: Sliding Center Sanki
- Location: Sochi, Russia
- Dates: 15 February
- Competitors: 38 from 11 nations
- Teams: 19
- Winning time: 1:39.384

Medalists
gold medal	Toni Eggert; Sascha Benecken	Germany
silver medal	Alexander Denisyev; Vladislav Antonov	Russia
bronze medal	Tobias Wendl; Tobias Arlt	Germany

The Doubles competition at the 2020 FIL World Luge Championships will be held on 15 February 2020.

== Results ==
The first run was held at 13:49 and the second run at 15:09.

Rank	Bib	Name	Country	Run 1	Rank	Run 2	Rank	Total	Diff
1st place, gold medalist(s)	2	Toni Eggert; Sascha Benecken	Germany	49.568	1	49.816	4	1:39.384	
2nd place, silver medalist(s)	1	Alexander Denisyev; Vladislav Antonov	Russia	49.723	3	49.765	2	1:39.488	+0.104
3rd place, bronze medalist(s)	6	Tobias Wendl; Tobias Arlt	Germany	49.688	2	49.838	5	1:39.526	+0.142
4	11	Vsevolod Kashkin; Konstantin Korshunov	Russia	49.774	4	49.813	3	1:39.587	+0.203
5	12	Emanuel Rieder; Simon Kainzwaldner	Italy	49.842	12	49.842	6	1:39.684	+0.300
6	9	Vladislav Yuzhakov; Yuri Prokhorov	Russia	49.875	6	49.845	7	1:39.720	+0.336
7	5	Oskars Gudramovičs; Pēteris Kalniņš	Latvia	50.022	9	49.921	8	1:39.943	+0.559
8	8	Ivan Nagler; Fabian Malleier	Italy	50.010	8	50.071	10	1:40.081	+0.697
9	4	Robin Johannes Geueke; David Gamm	Germany	50.001	7	50.137	11	1:40.138	+0.754
10	3	Andris Šics; Juris Šics	Latvia	50.441	14	49.700	1	1:40.141	+0.757
11	14	Yannick Müller; Armin Frauscher	Austria	50.204	11	50.144	12	1:40.348	+0.964
12	10	Ludwig Rieder; Patrick Rastner	Italy	50.308	12	50.223	13	1:40.531	+1.147
13	7	Wojciech Chmielewski; Jakub Kowalewski	Poland	50.366	13	50.437	16	1:40.803	+1.419
14	16	Park Jin-yong; Cho Jung-myung	South Korea	50.494	16	50.325	14	1:40.819	+1.435
15	17	Andrey Shander; Semen Mikov	Kazakhstan	50.473	15	50.415	15	1:40.888	+1.504
16	13	Kristens Putins; Imants Marcinkēvičs	Latvia	51.178	18	49.960	9	1:41.138	+1.754
17	18	Tomáš Vaverčák; Matej Zmij	Slovakia	50.738	17	50.749	17	1:41.487	+2.103
18	19	Filip Vejdělek; Zdeněk Pěkný	Czech Republic	51.578	19	Did not advance			
	15	Chris Mazdzer; Jayson Terdiman	United States	50.114	10	Disqualified			
