= 2019–20 Luge World Cup =

International luge competition

Winners
- Men's singles: (Russia) Roman Repilov
- Men's sprint: (Russia) Roman Repilov
- Doubles: (Germany) Toni Eggert / Sascha Benecken
- Doubles sprint: (Latvia) Andris Šics / Juris Šics
- Women's singles: (Germany) Julia Taubitz
- Women's sprint: (Germany) Julia Taubitz
- Team relay: Italy & Russia

Competitions
- Venues: 9/9

The 2019–20 Luge World Cup was a multi race tournament over a season for Luge, organised by the FIL. The season started 23 November 2019 in Innsbruck, Austria, and finished 1 March 2020 in Königssee, Germany.

== Calendar ==
Venue	Date	Details
(Austria) Innsbruck	23–24 November	Team Relay
(United States) Lake Placid	30 November–1 December	Sprint
(Canada) Whistler (Vancouver)	13–14 December	Sprint
(Germany) Altenberg	11–12 January	Team Relay
(Norway) Lillehammer	18–19 January	Team Relay/FIL European Championships
(Latvia) Sigulda	25–26 January	Sprint
(Germany) Oberhof	1–2 February	Team Relay
(Russia) Sochi	14–16 February	World Championships (Doesn't count toward to the World Cup standings)
(Germany) Winterberg	22–23 February	Team Relay
(Germany) Königssee	29 February–1 March	Team Relay

== Results ==
=== Men's singles ===
Event:	Gold:	Time	Silver:	Time	Bronze:	Time
Innsbruck	(Austria) Jonas Müller	1:41.015 (50.539 / 50.476)	(Russia) Roman Repilov	1:41.162 (50.779 / 50.383)	(Italy) Dominik Fischnaller	1:41.207 (50.659 / 50.548)
Lake Placid	(Austria) Jonas Müller	1:41.437 (50.624 / 50.813)	(United States) Tucker West	1:41.458 (50.607 / 50.851)	(Italy) Dominik Fischnaller	1:41.489 (50.769 / 50.720)
Lake Placid (Sprint)	(Russia) Roman Repilov	32.158	(United States) Tucker West	32.191	(Austria) Jonas Müller	32.280
Whistler	(Russia) Roman Repilov	1:39.713 (49.874 / 49.839)	(Germany) Felix Loch	1:39.860 (49.903 / 49.957)	(Italy) Dominik Fischnaller	1:39.884 (49.959 / 49.925)
Whistler (Sprint)	(Austria) Reinhard Egger	36.449	(Russia) Roman Repilov	36.456	(Austria) Jonas Müller	36.493
Altenberg	(Austria) David Gleirscher	1:48.150 (54.219 / 53.931)	(Italy) Dominik Fischnaller	1:48.383 (54.409 / 53.974)	(Germany) Felix Loch	1:48.420 (54.523 / 53.897)
Lillehammer	(Italy) Dominik Fischnaller	1:37.737 (48.763 / 48.974)	(Russia) Semen Pavlichenko	1:37.911 (48.761 / 49.150)	(Russia) Roman Repilov	1:37.965 (48.889 / 49.076)
Sigulda	(Germany) Johannes Ludwig	1:37.246 (48.898 / 48.348)	(Russia) Roman Repilov	1:37.263 (48.927 / 48.336)	(Austria) David Gleirscher	1:37.268 (48.695 / 48.573)
Sigulda (Sprint)	(Russia) Semen Pavlichenko	29.082	(Italy) Dominik Fischnaller	29.151	(Austria) David Gleirscher	29.156
Oberhof	(Germany) Johannes Ludwig	1:28.267 (44.745 / 43.522)	(Russia) Semen Pavlichenko	1:28.431 (44.743 / 43.688)	(Latvia) Inārs Kivlenieks	1:28.437 (44.365 / 44.072)
Winterberg	(Germany) Johannes Ludwig	1:52.285 (55.662 / 56.623)	(Latvia) Kristers Aparjods	1:52.464 (56.084 / 56.380)	(Germany) Sebastian Bley	1:52.507 (55.909 / 56.598)
Königssee	(Russia) Semen Pavlichenko	1:38.359 (49.026 / 49.333)	(Austria) Jonas Müller	1:38.362 (49.058 / 49.304)	(Russia) Roman Repilov	1:38.426 (49.130 / 49.296)

=== Women's singles ===
Event:	Gold:	Time	Silver:	Time	Bronze:	Time
Innsbruck	(Russia) Tatiana Ivanova	1:21.304 (40.875 / 40.429)	(United States) Summer Britcher	1:21.414 (40.693 / 40.721)	(Germany) Julia Taubitz	1:21.468 (40.728 / 40.740)
Innsbruck	(Russia) Tatiana Ivanova	1:21.304 (40.875 / 40.429)	(United States) Summer Britcher	1:21.414 (40.693 / 40.721)	(Germany) Jessica Tiebel	1:21.468 (40.674 / 40.794)
Lake Placid	(Germany) Julia Taubitz	1:27.484 (43.826 / 43.658)	(United States) Emily Sweeney	1:27.551 (43.863 / 43.688)	(Russia) Victoria Demchenko	1:27.706 (43.883 / 43.823)
Lake Placid (Sprint)	(Germany) Julia Taubitz	37.187	(United States) Summer Britcher	37.238	(United States) Emily Sweeney	37.369
Whistler	(Russia) Tatiana Ivanova	1:17.378 (38.736 / 38.642)	(Germany) Anna Berreiter	1:17.569 (38.745 / 38.824)	(Russia) Victoria Demchenko	1:17.599 (38.868 / 38.731)
Whistler (Sprint)	(Russia) Tatiana Ivanova	27.839	(United States) Emily Sweeney	27.883	(Germany) Cheyenne Rosenthal	27.904
Altenberg	(Germany) Julia Taubitz	1:44.264 (52.092 / 52.172)	(Russia) Tatiana Ivanova	1:44.436 (52.197 / 52.239)	(Italy) Andrea Vötter	1:44.647 (52.403 / 52.244)
Lillehammer	(Russia) Tatiana Ivanova	1:35.482 (47.826 / 47.656)	(United States) Summer Britcher	1:35.599 (47.827 / 47.772)	(Germany) Julia Taubitz	1:35.624 (47.753 / 47.871)
Sigulda	(Germany) Julia Taubitz	1:24.944 (42.632 / 42.312)	(Russia) Tatiana Ivanova	1:25.059 (42.634 / 42.425)	(Latvia) Elīza Cauce	1:25.094 (42.606 / 42.488)
Sigulda (Sprint)	(Germany) Julia Taubitz	31.334	(Russia) Victoria Demchenko	31.403	(Russia) Tatiana Ivanova	31.458
Oberhof	(Germany) Anna Berreiter	1:22.836 (41.458 / 41.378)	(Russia) Tatiana Ivanova	1:22.876 (41.474 / 41.402)	(United States) Summer Britcher	1:22.940 (41.546 / 41.394)
Winterberg	(Latvia) Elīza Cauce	1:27.481 (43.805 / 43.676)	(Russia) Tatiana Ivanova	1:27.561 (43.785 / 43.776)	(Germany) Julia Taubitz	1:27.673 (43.883 / 43.790)
Königssee	(Germany) Anna Berreiter	1:41.476 (50.744 / 50.732)	(Germany) Julia Taubitz	1:41.554 (50.830 / 50.724)	(Russia) Victoria Demchenko	1:41.623 (50.903 / 50.720)

=== Doubles ===
Event:	Gold:	Time	Silver:	Time	Bronze:	Time
Innsbruck	Toni Eggert; Sascha Benecken; Germany	1:20.732 (40.527 / 40.205)	Tobias Wendl; Tobias Arlt; Germany	1:20.741 (40.403 / 40.338)	Thomas Steu; Lorenz Koller; Austria	1:20.820 (40.561 / 40.259)
Lake Placid	Tobias Wendl; Tobias Arlt; Germany	1:27.317 (43.713 / 43.604)	Toni Eggert; Sascha Benecken; Germany	1:27.501 (43.762 / 43.739)	Thomas Steu; Lorenz Koller; Austria	1:27.513 (43.797 / 43.716)
Lake Placid (Sprint)	Andris Šics; Juris Šics; Latvia	37.218	Toni Eggert; Sascha Benecken; Germany	37.226	Tobias Wendl; Tobias Arlt; Germany	37.255
Whistler	Toni Eggert; Sascha Benecken; Germany	1:16.644 (38.353 / 38.291)	Tobias Wendl; Tobias Arlt; Germany	1:16.703 (38.347 / 38.356)	Vsevolod Kashkin; Konstantin Korshunov; Russia	1:16.878 (38.454 / 38.424)
Whistler (Sprint)	Toni Eggert; Sascha Benecken; Germany	27.759	Tobias Wendl; Tobias Arlt; Germany	27.762	Vsevolod Kashkin; Konstantin Korshunov; Russia	27.763
Altenberg	Thomas Steu; Lorenz Koller; Austria	1:23.779 (41.823 / 41.956)	Toni Eggert; Sascha Benecken; Germany	1:24.007 (41.920 / 42.087)	Alexander Denisyev; Vladislav Antonov; Russia	1:24.060 (42.172 / 41.888)
Lillehammer	Alexander Denisyev; Vladislav Antonov; Russia	1:35.585 (47.779 / 47.806)	Thomas Steu; Lorenz Koller; Austria	1:35.685 (47.815 / 47.870)	Vladislav Yuzhakov; Yuri Prokhorov; Russia	1:35.757 (47.880 / 47.877)
Sigulda	Andris Šics; Juris Šics; Latvia	1:23.804 (41.970 / 41.834)	Tobias Wendl; Tobias Arlt; Germany	1:23.834 (42.003 / 41.831)	Toni Eggert; Sascha Benecken; Germany	1:24.045 (42.091 / 41.954)
Sigulda (Sprint)	Kristens Putins; Imants Marcinkēvičs; Latvia	31.713	Emanuel Rieder; Simon Kainzwaldner; Italy	31.720		
Sigulda (Sprint)	Kristens Putins; Imants Marcinkēvičs; Latvia	31.713	Andris Šics; Juris Šics; Latvia	31.720		
Oberhof	Tobias Wendl; Tobias Arlt; Germany	1:23.695 (41.681 / 42.014)	Andris Šics; Juris Šics; Latvia	1:23.812 (42.071 / 41.741)	Robin Johannes Geueke; David Gamm; Germany	1:23.866 (42.127 / 41.739)
Winterberg	Alexander Denisyev; Vladislav Antonov; Russia	1:33.622 (46.621 / 47.001)	Oskars Gudramovičs; Pēteris Kalniņš; Latvia	1:34.230 (46.693 / 47.537)	Wojclech Jerzy Chmielewski; Jakub Kowalewski; Poland	1:34.385 (46.865 / 47.520)
Königssee	Toni Eggert; Sascha Benecken; Germany	1:39.777 (49.863 / 49.914)	Tobias Wendl; Tobias Arlt; Germany	1:40.043 (49.944 / 50.099)	Andris Šics; Juris Šics; Latvia	1:40.836 (50.418 / 50.418)

=== Team relay ===
Event:	Gold:	Time	Silver:	Time	Bronze:	Time
Innsbruck	Italy; Andrea Vötter; Dominik Fischnaller; Ivan Nagler/Fabian Malleier	2:09.638 (41.778 / 1:25.616)	Austria; Lisa Schulte; Jonas Müller; Thomas Steu/Lorenz Koller	2:09.663 (41.823 / 1:25.450)	Germany; Julia Taubitz; Felix Loch; Toni Eggert/Sascha Benecken	2:09.866 (41.530 / 1:25.692)
Altenberg	Russia; Tatiana Ivanova; Semen Pavlichenko; Alexander Denisyev/Vladislav Antonov	2:22.517 (46.575 / 1:34.177)	Germany; Julia Taubitz; Felix Loch; Toni Eggert/Sascha Benecken	2:22.530 (46.355 / 1:34.385)	Italy; Andrea Vötter; Dominik Fischnaller; Emanuel Rieder/Simon Kainzwaldner	2:22.620 (46.656 / 1:34.366)
Lillehammer	Austria; Madeleine Egle; David Gleirscher; Thomas Steu/Lorenz Koller	2:36.912 (51.218 / 1:43.876)	Italy; Andrea Vötter; Dominik Fischnaller; Ivan Nagler/Fabian Malleier	2:37.020 (51.289 / 1:43.937)	Latvia; Ulla Zirne; Kristers Aparjods; Andris Šics/Juris Šics	2:37.543 (51.309 / 1:44.058)
Oberhof	Germany; Anna Berreiter; Johannes Ludwig; Tobias Wendl/Tobias Arlt	2:22.678 (46.386 / 1:34.382)	United States; Summer Britcher; Tucker West; Chris Mazdzer/Jayson Terdiman	2:22.748 (46.048 / 1:34.097)	Latvia; Kendija Aparjode; Inārs Kivlenieks; Andris Šics/Juris Šics	2:22.778 (46.293 / 1:34.366)
Winterberg	Russia; Tatiana Ivanova; Semen Pavlichenko; Alexander Denisyev/Vladislav Antonov	2:36.848 (51.941 / 1:44.510)	Italy; Sandra Robatscher; Dominik Fischnaller; Emanuel Rieder/Simon Kainzwaldner	2:37.342 (51.637 / 1:44.695)	Latvia; Elīza Cauce; Kristers Aparjods; Oskars Gudramovičs/Pēteris Kalniņš	2:37.447 (52.004 / 1:44.792)
Königssee	Germany; Anna Berreiter; Felix Loch; Toni Eggert/Sascha Benecken	2:42.209 (53.157 / 1:47.466)	United States; Summer Britcher; Tucker West; Chris Mazdzer/Jayson Terdiman	2:43.019 (53.158 / 1:47.750)	Russia; Victoria Demchenko; Semen Pavlichenko; Vladislav Yuzhakov/Yuri Prokhorov	2:43.217 (53.069 / 1:47.573)

== Standings ==
=== Men's singles ===
Pos.	Luger	Points
1.	Roman Repilov (RUS)	765
2.	Dominik Fischnaller (ITA)	749
3.	Semen Pavlichenko (RUS)*	741
4.	Johannes Ludwig (GER)	645
5.	Jonas Müller (AUT)	556
6.	David Gleirscher (AUT)	549
7.	Felix Loch (GER)	482
8.	Reinhard Egger (AUT)	464
9.	Max Langenhan (GER)	462
10.	Kristers Aparjods (LAT)	456

- Final standings after 12 events
- (*Champion 2019)

=== Men's singles Sprint ===
Pos.	Luger	Agg. time
1.	Roman Repilov (RUS)*	1:38.018
2.	Semen Pavlichenko (RUS)	1:38.090
3.	Reinhard Egger (AUT)	1:38.249
4.	Max Langenhan (GER)	1:38.472
5.	Wolfgang Kindl (AUT)	1:38.611
6.	Johannes Ludwig (GER)	1:38.819

- Final standings after 3 events
- (*Champion 2019)

Only 6 lugers competed on all events

=== Women's singles ===
Pos.	Luger	Points
1.	Julia Taubitz (GER)	965
2.	Tatiana Ivanova (RUS)	957
3.	Victoria Demchenko (RUS)	722
4.	Anna Berreiter (GER)	637
5.	Summer Britcher (USA)	523
6.	Ekaterina Katnikova (RUS)	519
7.	Andrea Vötter (ITA)	486
8.	Kendija Aparjode (LAT)	457
9.	Elīza Cauce (LAT)	456
10.	Cheyenne Rosenthal (GER)	396

- Final standings after 12 events

=== Women's singles Sprint ===
Pos.	Luger	Agg. time
1.	Julia Taubitz (GER)	1:36.466
2.	Tatiana Ivanova (RUS)	1:36.796
3.	Victoria Demchenko (RUS)	1:36.850
4.	Emily Sweeney (USA)	1:36.917
5.	Ekaterina Katnikova (RUS)	1:37.016
6.	Kendija Aparjode (LAT)	1:37.059
7.	Anna Berreiter (GER)	1:37.089
8.	Natalie Maag (SUI)	1:37.124

- Final standings after 3 events

Only 8 lugers competed on all events

=== Doubles ===
Pos.	Team	Points
1.	Toni Eggert / Sascha Benecken (GER)*	872
2.	Tobias Wendl / Tobias Arlt (GER)	847
3.	Andris Šics / Juris Šics (LAT)	720
4.	Alexander Denisyev / Vladislav Antonov (RUS)	630
5.	Oskars Gudramovičs / Pēteris Kalniņš (LAT)	543
6.	Robin Johannes Geueke / David Gamm (GER)	542
7.	Thomas Steu / Lorenz Koller (AUT)	486
8.	Vladislav Yuzhakov / Yuri Prokhorov (RUS)	476
9.	Emanuel Rieder / Simon Kainzwaldner (ITA)	466
10.	Vsevolod Kashkin / Konstantin Korshunov (RUS)	456

- Final standings after 12 events
- (*Champion 2019)

=== Doubles Sprint ===
Pos.	Team	Agg. time
1.	Andris Šics / Juris Šics (LAT)	1:36.774
2.	Toni Eggert / Sascha Benecken (GER)*	1:36.788
3.	Tobias Wendl / Tobias Arlt (GER)	1:36.789
4.	Vladislav Yuzhakov / Yuri Prokhorov (RUS)	1:37.175
5.	Robin Johannes Geueke / David Gamm (GER)	1:37.318
6.	Tristan Walker / Justin Snith (CAN)	1:37.704
7.	Alexander Denisyev / Vladislav Antonov (RUS)	1:37.821
8.	Wojclech Jerzy Chmielewski / Jakub Kowalewski (POL)	1:37.853
9.	Ludwig Rieder / Patrick Rastner (ITA)	1:38.335
10.	Oskars Gudramovičs / Pēteris Kalniņš (LAT)	1:39.446

- Final standings after 3 events
- (*Champion 2019)

=== Team Relay ===
Pos.	Team	Points
1.	Italy	431
1.	Russia	431
3.	Germany*	415
4.	Latvia	380
5.	Austria	291
6.	Slovakia	277
7.	United States	270
8.	Ukraine	249
9.	Poland	237
10.	Canada	148
10.	Czech Republic	148

- Final standings after 6 events
- (*Champion 2019)

== Medal table ==
Rank	Nation	Gold	Silver	Bronze	Total
1	Germany	18	12	11	41
2	Russia	12	10	11	33
3	Austria	6	3	6	15
4	Latvia	4	4	6	14
5	Italy	2	5	5	12
6	United States	0	9	2	11
7	Poland	0	0	1	1
Totals (7 entries)		42	43	42	127
