= 2020 FIL World Luge Championships – Doubles' sprint =

Doubles' sprint at the 2020 FIL World Luge Championships
- Venue: Sliding Center Sanki
- Location: Sochi, Russia
- Dates: 14 February
- Competitors: 38 from 11 nations
- Teams: 19
- Winning time: 31.281

Medalists
gold medal	Alexander Denisyev; Vladislav Antonov	Russia
silver medal	Emanuel Rieder; Simon Kainzwaldner	Italy
bronze medal	Tobias Wendl; Tobias Arlt	Germany

The Doubles' sprint competition at the 2020 FIL World Luge Championships was held on 14 February 2020.

== Results ==
The qualification was held at 09:00 and the final at 13:34.

Rank	Bib	Name	Country	Qualification		Final Run	
Rank	Bib	Name	Country	Time	Rank	Time	Diff
1st place, gold medalist(s)	12	Alexander Denisyev; Vladislav Antonov	Russia	31.564	8	31.281	
2nd place, silver medalist(s)	7	Emanuel Rieder; Simon Kainzwaldner	Italy	31.446	2	31.326	+0.045
3rd place, bronze medalist(s)	14	Tobias Wendl; Tobias Arlt	Germany	31.583	10	31.362	+0.081
4	15	Toni Eggert; Sascha Benecken	Germany	31.280	1	31.363	+0.082
5	8	Vsevolod Kashkin; Konstantin Korshunov	Russia	31.676	13	31.365	+0.084
6	10	Vladislav Yuzhakov; Yuri Prokhorov	Russia	31.452	3	31.374	+0.093
7	13	Andris Šics; Juris Šics	Latvia	31.453	4	31.404	+0.123
8	2	Yannick Müller; Armin Frauscher	Austria	31.487	5	31.447	+0.166
9	16	Chris Mazdzer; Jayson Terdiman	United States	31.552	6	31.534	+0.253
10	5	Wojciech Chmielewski; Jakub Kowalewski	Poland	31.896	14	31.880	+0.599
11	4	Ludwig Rieder; Patrick Rastner	Italy	31.988	15	31.889	+0.608
12	11	Robin Johannes Geueke; David Gamm	Germany	31.661	12	32.158	+0.877
13	6	Kristens Putins; Imants Marcinkēvičs	Latvia	31.605	11	32.221	+0.940
14	9	Oskars Gudramovičs; Pēteris Kalniņš	Latvia	31.559	7	32.231	+0.950
15	3	Ivan Nagler; Fabian Malleier	Italy	31.573	9	32.949	+1.668
16	18	Andrey Shander; Semen Mikov	Kazakhstan	32.059	16	Did not advance	
17	19	Tomáš Vaverčák; Matej Zmij	Slovakia	32.066	17	Did not advance	
18	1	Park Jin-yong; Cho Jung-myung	South Korea	32.067	18	Did not advance	
19	17	Filip Vejdělek; Zdeněk Pěkný	Czech Republic	32.700	19	Did not advance	
