= Lūkass Krasts =

Latvian luger (born 2001)

- Krasts in 2026

Personal information
- Nationality: Latvian
- Born: 3 January 2001 (age 25) Riga, Latvia

Sport
- Sport: Luge
Medal record
Men's luge
Representing Latvia
European Championships
Bronze medal – third place	2023 Sigulda	Doubles

Lūkass Krasts (born 3 January 2001) is a Latvian luger.

== Career ==
In January 2024, Krasts competed at the 2023 FIL European Luge Championships and won a bronze medal in the doubles event, along with Eduards Ševics-Mikeļševics. He then competed at the 2023 FIL World Luge Championships and finished in 12th place in the doubles event. He won a bronze medal in the U-23 doubles category.

He competed at the 2024 FIL World Luge Championships and finished in fourth place in the doubles event, with a time of 1:23.516.

During the 2025–26 Luge World Cup he earned his first career World Cup victory on 3 January 2026 in the doubles event with a time of 1:23.508. He was selected to represent Latvia at the 2026 Winter Olympics. He competed in the doubles event and finished in ninth place with a time of 1:45.683.
