= Eduards Ševics-Mikeļševics =

Latvian luger (born 2001)

- Ševics-Mikeļševics in 2026

Personal information
- Nationality: Latvian
- Born: 16 April 2001 (age 25) Riga, Latvia
- Height: 193 cm (6 ft 4 in)

Sport
- Sport: Luge
Medal record
Men's luge
Representing Latvia
European Championships
Bronze medal – third place	2023 Sigulda	Doubles

Eduards Ševics-Mikeļševics (born 16 April 2001) is a Latvian luger.

== Career ==
In January 2024, Ševics-Mikeļševics competed at the 2023 FIL European Luge Championships and won a bronze medal in the doubles event, along with Lūkass Krasts. He then competed at the 2023 FIL World Luge Championships and finished in 12th place in the doubles event. He won a bronze medal in the U-23 doubles category.

He competed at the 2024 FIL World Luge Championships and finished in fourth place in the doubles event, with a time of 1:23.516.

During the 2025–26 Luge World Cup he earned his first career World Cup victory on 3 January 2026 in the doubles event with a time of 1:23.508. He was selected to represent Latvia at the 2026 Winter Olympics. He competed in the doubles event and finished in ninth place with a time of 1:45.683.
