= Tobias Wendl =

German luger (born 1987)

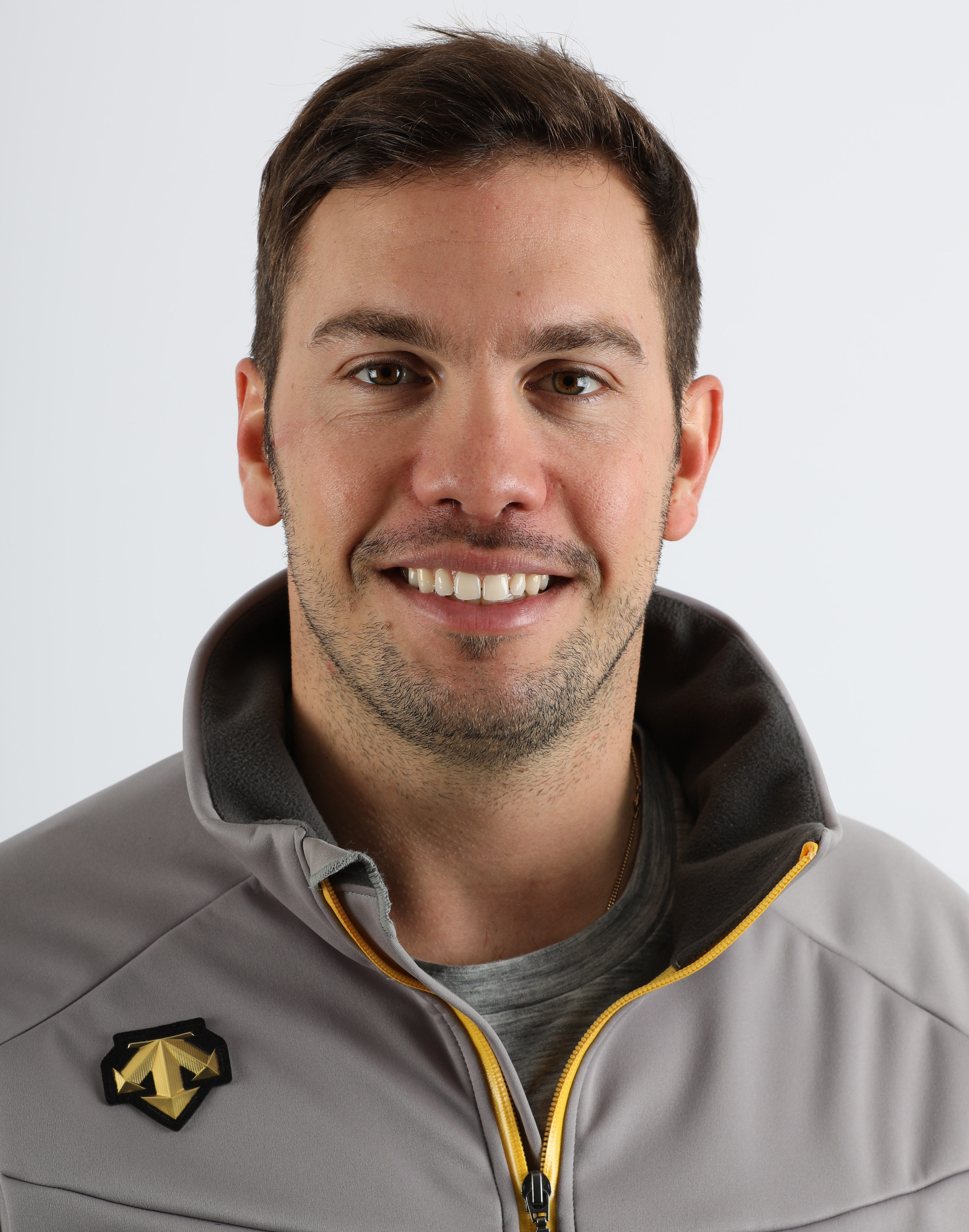
- Tobias Wendl in 2018

Personal information
- Nationality: German
- Born: 16 June 1987 (age 39) Aachen, West Germany
- Height: 1.84 m (6 ft 0 in)
- Weight: 88 kg (194 lb)

Sport
- Country: Germany
- Sport: Luge
- Event: Doubles
- Coached by: Patric Leitner; Norbert Loch; Georg Hackl
Medal record
Men's luge
Representing Germany
Olympic Games
Gold medal – first place	2014 Sochi	Doubles
Gold medal – first place	2014 Sochi	Team relay
Gold medal – first place	2018 Pyeongchang	Doubles
Gold medal – first place	2018 Pyeongchang	Team relay
Gold medal – first place	2022 Beijing	Doubles
Gold medal – first place	2022 Beijing	Team relay
Gold medal – first place	2026 Milano Cortina	Team relay
Bronze medal – third place	2026 Milano Cortina	Doubles
World Championships
Gold medal – first place	2013 Whistler	Doubles
Gold medal – first place	2013 Whistler	Team relay
Gold medal – first place	2015 Sigulda	Doubles
Gold medal – first place	2015 Sigulda	Team relay
Gold medal – first place	2016 Königssee	Doubles
Gold medal – first place	2016 Königssee	Doubles' sprint
Gold medal – first place	2016 Königssee	Team relay
Gold medal – first place	2017 Igls	Doubles' sprint
Gold medal – first place	2021 Königssee	Doubles' sprint
Gold medal – first place	2024 Altenberg	Team relay
Silver medal – second place	2008 Oberhof	Doubles
Silver medal – second place	2017 Igls	Doubles
Silver medal – second place	2019 Winterberg	Doubles
Silver medal – second place	2019 Winterberg	Doubles' sprint
Silver medal – second place	2021 Königssee	Doubles
Silver medal – second place	2023 Oberhof	Doubles
Silver medal – second place	2023 Oberhof	Doubles' sprint
Bronze medal – third place	2020 Sochi	Doubles
Bronze medal – third place	2020 Sochi	Doubles' sprint
Bronze medal – third place	2024 Alternberg	Doubles
Bronze medal – third place	2025 Whistler	Doubles
Bronze medal – third place	2025 Whistler	Mixed doubles
European Championships
Gold medal – first place	2015 Sochi	Doubles
Gold medal – first place	2015 Sochi	Team relay
Gold medal – first place	2017 Königssee	Doubles
Gold medal – first place	2017 Königssee	Team relay
Gold medal – first place	2019 Oberhof	Doubles
Gold medal – first place	2023 Sigulda	Doubles
Gold medal – first place	2025 Winterberg	Doubles
Gold medal – first place	2026 Oberhof	Doubles
Gold medal – first place	2026 Oberhof	Team relay
Silver medal – second place	2010 Sigulda	Doubles
Silver medal – second place	2012 Paramonovo	Doubles
Silver medal – second place	2012 Paramonovo	Team relay
Silver medal – second place	2013 Oberhof	Doubles
Silver medal – second place	2016 Altenberg	Doubles
Silver medal – second place	2019 Oberhof	Team relay
Silver medal – second place	2021 Sigulda	Doubles
Silver medal – second place	2022 St. Moritz	Doubles
Silver medal – second place	2023 Sigulda	Team relay
Silver medal – second place	2024 Igls	Team relay
Silver medal – second place	2025 Winterberg	Team relay
Bronze medal – third place	2010 Sigulda	Team relay
Bronze medal – third place	2018 Sigulda	Doubles
Bronze medal – third place	2021 Sigulda	Team relay
Bronze medal – third place	2024 Igls	Doubles

Tobias Wendl (born 16 June 1987) is a German luger who has competed since 1993, acting as a front. He won a silver medal in the men's doubles event at the 2008 FIL World Luge Championships in Oberhof, Germany, a silver and a bronze at the FIL European Luge Championships 2010 in Sigulda, a gold at the FIL World Luge Championships 2013, and two gold medals at his debut Winter Olympics at the 2014 Winter Olympics in Sochi. He is also a Master Sergeant in the German Army.

== Career ==
Wendl was born on 16 June 1987 in Aachen, Germany. He began competing in the luge in 1993; and became a part of the national team in 2005, luging as a front. At the 2008 FIL World Luge Championships in Oberhof, Germany, he won a silver medal; and at the FIL European Luge Championships 2010 in Sigulda, Wendl won a silver medal in men's doubles and a bronze medal in the team relay events. He won a gold medal at the FIL World Luge Championships 2013, in Whistler, Canada. Wendl competes in the double with Tobias Arlt, and is the front. Their nickname when competing together is "The Bayern-Express" and "The Two Tobis".

He competed at the 2024 FIL World Luge Championships and won a gold medal in the team relay and a bronze medal in the doubles event.

=== Olympics ===
Wendl won two gold medals at the 2014 Winter Olympics in Sochi; in the luge double with Tobias Arlt, he won a gold in a time of 1 minute and 38:933 seconds at the Sanki Sliding track: this was half a second ahead of the second-placed Andreas Linger and Wolfgang Linger of Austria; this winning margin was the biggest ever in Olympic luge doubles. In the pair's first run, they set a track record of 49.373 seconds.

Wendl then won the team relay with Felix Loch, Natalie Geisenberger, and Tobias Arlt; finishing more than one full second ahead of the second-placed Russian Federation team, in a time of 2 minutes and 45.649 seconds.

At the 2026 Winter Olympics, Wendl won a bronze medal in the doubles event, along with Arlt. This ended Germany's bid for a fourth consecutive gold medal in doubles at the Olympics.

== Personal life ==
He is also a Master Sergeant in the German Army.

== Luge results ==
All results are sourced from the International Luge Federation (FIL) and German Bobsleigh, Luge and Skeleton Federation (BSD).

=== World Championships ===
- 21 medals – (10 gold, 6 silver, 5 bronze)

Year	Age	Doubles	Sprint	Team relay	Mixed doubles
(Italy) 2011 Cesena	23	DNF	—N/a	—N/a	—N/a
(Germany) 2012 Altenberg	24	4th	—N/a	—	—N/a
(Canada) 2013 Whistler	25	Gold	—N/a	Gold	—N/a
(Latvia) 2015 Sigulda	27	Gold	—N/a	Gold	—N/a
(Germany) 2016 Königssee	28	Gold	Gold	Gold	—N/a
(Austria) 2017 Innsbruck	29	Silver	Gold	—	—N/a
(Germany) 2019 Winterberg	31	Silver	Silver	—	—N/a
(Russia) 2020 Sochi	32	Bronze	Bronze	—	—N/a
(Germany) 2021 Königssee	33	Silver	Gold	—	—N/a
(Germany) 2023 Oberhof	35	Silver	Silver	—	—N/a
(Germany) 2024 Altenberg	36	Bronze	7th	Gold	—N/a
(Canada) 2025 Whistler	37	Bronze	—N/a	—	Bronze

=== World Cup ===
Season	Doubles									Sprint				Team relay						Points	Overall	Doubles	Sprint
Season	1	2	3	4	5	6	7	8	9	1	2	3	4	1	2	3	4	5	6	Points	Overall	Doubles	Sprint
2007–08	7	4	5	9	2	3	4	5	—N/a	—N/a	—N/a	—N/a	—N/a	–	2	–	–	—N/a	—N/a	470	5th	—N/a	—N/a
2008–09	6	5	4	2	5	1	5	10	16	—N/a	—N/a	—N/a	—N/a	2	–	–	1	1	—N/a	521	4th	—N/a	—N/a
2009–10	11	5	5	8	1	5	2	1	—N/a	—N/a	—N/a	—N/a	—N/a	–	1	1	1	–	—N/a	526	4th	—N/a	—N/a
2010–11	4	1	1	3	1	1	2	2	7	—N/a	—N/a	—N/a	—N/a	1	1	1	1	1	–	746	1st	—N/a	—N/a
2011–12	4	6	1	1	2	1	3	3	2	—N/a	—N/a	—N/a	—N/a	2	–	2	–	1	3	720	2nd	—N/a	—N/a
2012–13	1	1	1	2	1	2	8	1	1	—N/a	—N/a	—N/a	—N/a	1	1	1	1	1	1	827	1st	—N/a	—N/a
2013–14	1	2	1	1	1	1	2	1	–	—N/a	—N/a	—N/a	—N/a	–	–	1	1	1	3	770	1st	—N/a	—N/a
2014–15	4	2	2	1	1	2	1	1	1	3	1	3	—N/a	–	1	1	–	1	1	1055	2nd	—N/a	—N/a
2015–16	3	8	1	3	1	1	1	2	2	2	1	1	—N/a	–	–	1	2	–	–	1037	1st		
2016–17	3	8	2	1	1	10	1	2	13	2	2	3	—N/a	–	1	–	1	–	–	888	2nd		
2017–18	3	2	4	3	7	1	2	3	3	1	10	2	11	–	–	–	–	–	–	911	2nd	2nd	—N/a
2018–19	7	3	1	2	2	4	19	1	7	3	4	7	—N/a	–	1	–	–	2	–	790	3rd	3rd	1st
2019–20	2	1	2	7	7	2	1	–	2	3	2	4	—N/a	–	–	4	1	–	–	846	2nd	2nd	3rd
2020–21	4	3	18	1	2	2	2	9	5	5	3	7	—N/a	–	–	–	–	3	CNX	773	4th	4th	4th
2021–22	9	3	5	4	4	1	3	2	2	8	4	3	—N/a	–	2	–	4	–	–	796	3rd	2nd	3rd
2022–23	5	2	3	2	1	2	1	1	1	11	1	1	—N/a	–	2	2	–	1	2	1014	1st	1st	1st

== See also ==
- List of multiple Olympic gold medalists
