= Toni Eggert =

German luger (born 1988)

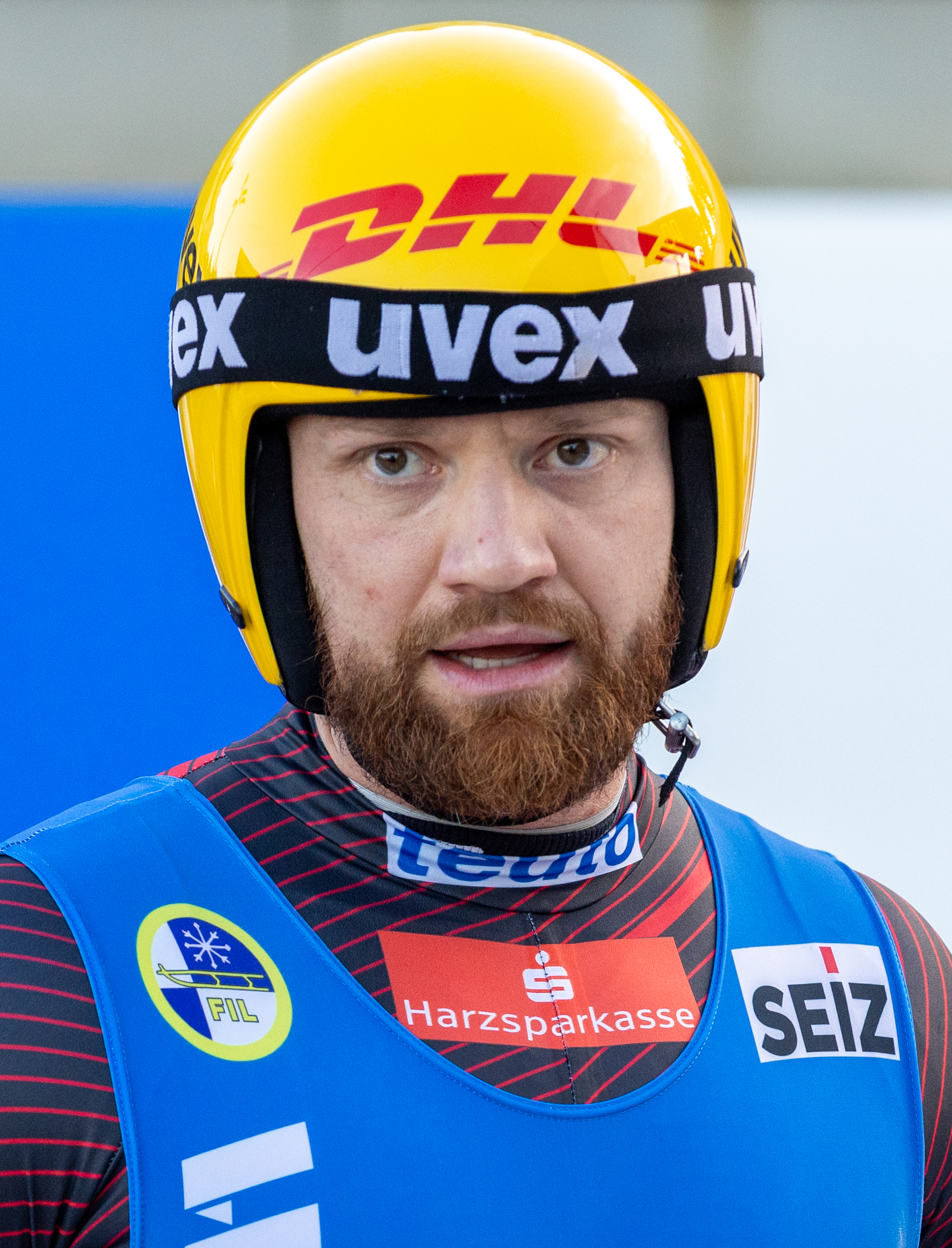
- Eggert in 2026

Personal information
- Nationality: German
- Born: 12 May 1988 (age 38) Suhl, East Germany
- Height: 1.91 m (6 ft 3 in)
- Weight: 85 kg (187 lb)

Sport
- Country: Germany
- Sport: Luge
- Event: Doubles
- Club: BRC Ilsenburg
Medal record
Men's luge
Representing Germany
Olympic Games
Silver medal – second place	2022 Beijing	Doubles
Bronze medal – third place	2018 Pyeongchang	Doubles
World Championships
Gold medal – first place	2012 Altenberg	Team relay
Gold medal – first place	2017 Igls	Doubles
Gold medal – first place	2017 Igls	Team relay
Gold medal – first place	2019 Winterberg	Doubles
Gold medal – first place	2019 Winterberg	Doubles' sprint
Gold medal – first place	2020 Sochi	Doubles
Gold medal – first place	2020 Sochi	Team relay
Gold medal – first place	2021 Königssee	Doubles
Gold medal – first place	2023 Oberhof	Doubles
Gold medal – first place	2023 Oberhof	Doubles' sprint
Gold medal – first place	2023 Oberhof	Team relay
Silver medal – second place	2012 Altenberg	Doubles
Silver medal – second place	2013 Whistler	Doubles
Silver medal – second place	2016 Königssee	Doubles
Silver medal – second place	2021 Königssee	Team relay
Bronze medal – third place	2017 Igls	Doubles' sprint
Bronze medal – third place	2019 Winterberg	Team relay
Bronze medal – third place	2021 Königssee	Doubles' sprint
European Championships
Gold medal – first place	2013 Oberhof	Doubles
Gold medal – first place	2013 Oberhof	Team relay
Gold medal – first place	2016 Altenberg	Doubles
Gold medal – first place	2016 Altenberg	Team relay
Gold medal – first place	2018 Sigulda	Doubles
Gold medal – first place	2022 St. Moritz	Doubles
Silver medal – second place	2017 Königssee	Doubles
Silver medal – second place	2018 Sigulda	Team relay
Silver medal – second place	2019 Oberhof	Doubles
Silver medal – second place	2022 St. Moritz	Team relay
Silver medal – second place	2026 Oberhof	Doubles
Silver medal – second place	2026 Oberhof	Mixed doubles
Bronze medal – third place	2012 Paramonovo	Doubles
World Cup
Event	1st	2nd	3rd
Doubles	43	32	11
Sprint	11	8	3
Team relay	19	8	3
Total	73	48	17
- Updated as of 26 February 2023

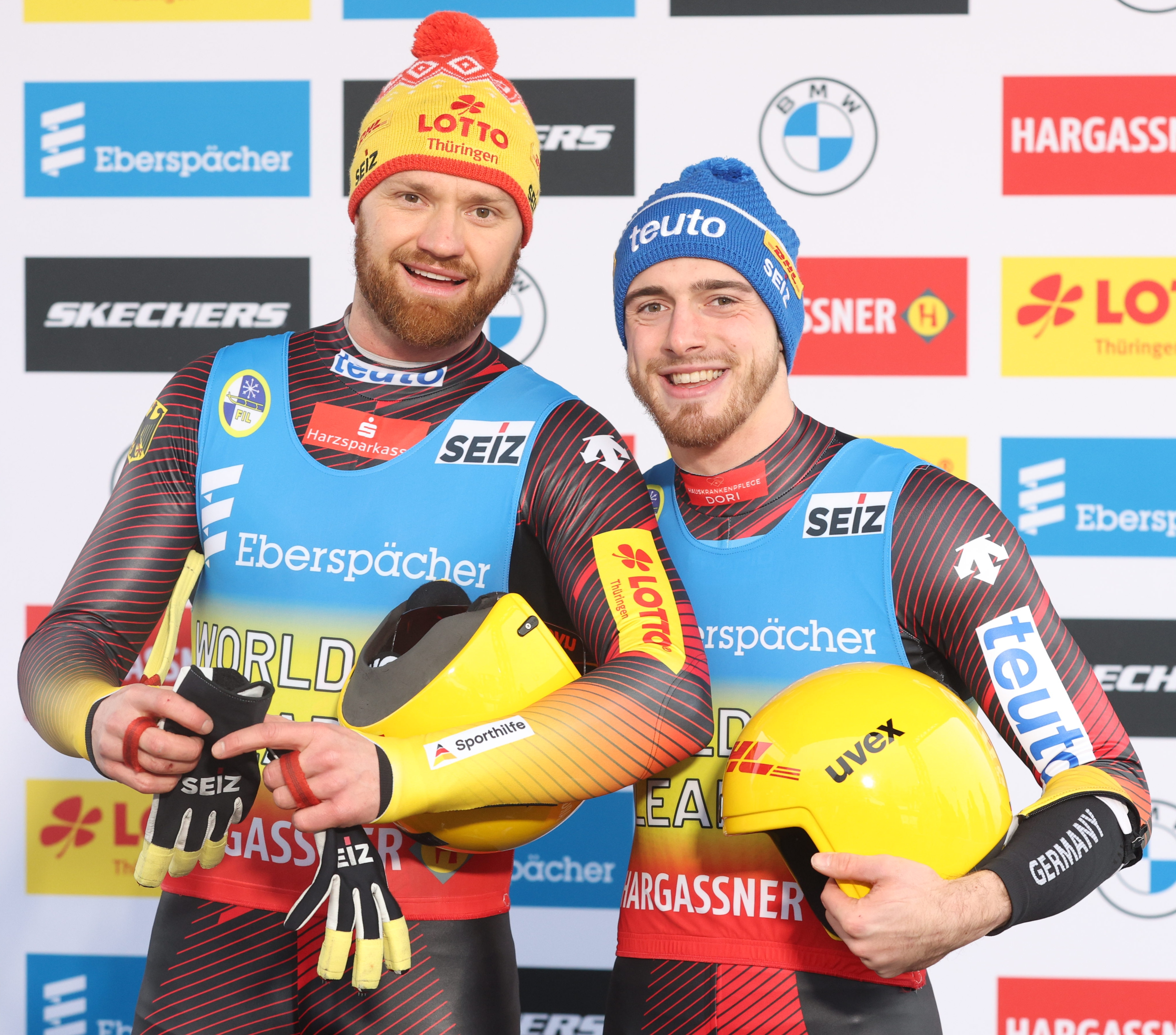
Eggert (left) with his doubles teammate Florian Müller in 2024

Toni Eggert (born 12 May 1988) is a German luger who has competed since 2008. With his doubles partner Sascha Benecken, he has been world champion ten times and won the overall World Cup six times.

== Career ==
Eggert is a sports soldier in the sports promotion group Oberhof and starts for the BRC Ilsenburg. He has been luging since 2000. He has competed in doubles with Marcel Oster since 2003. Both were already successful as juniors. They won twice in doubles, in 2007 in Cesana Pariol and in 2008 in Lake Placid, the Junior World Championships. They also won a title (2007) and a second place (2008) in the team competition. They also achieved great success in the Junior World Cup. In the 2005/06 season they finished third in the overall standings, in 2006/07 they came fourth and in 2007/08 they won the overall standings of the racing series. In the last junior season, they not only won the overall standings, but also all six races of the season and two races in the Challenge Cup. In 2007, Eggert and his partner also won the title at the German junior championships. Both have been part of the German B squad since the 2008/09 season and qualified to start in the Luge World Cup . They benefited from the injury-related failure of the doubles André Florschütz / Torsten Wustlich. Right at their first race, the duo was able to finish eighth in the top ten. Two more races followed with the same placement. For the fourth race, Eggert/Oster were replaced by their direct competitors for the World Cup place, Ronny Pietrasik and Christian Weise, who, however, placed 15th and were unable to match the performance of the Suhlers. They then started again in Cesana and achieved their last result so far as seventh place. For the remainder of the season she replaced the now recovered duo Florschütz/Wustlich.

In 2010 Sascha Benecken became Eggert's new partner. On January 14, 2012, the doubles achieved their first World Cup victory in Oberhof . On February 10, 2012, both won the silver medal in doubles at the World Championships in Altenberg and two days later the gold medal in the team relay. For this they both received the silver laurel leaf.

On 22 August 2023, Eggert, in conjunction with his doubles collaborator Benecken, officially declared their retirement from active involvement in competitive sports.

In October 2024, Eggert returned to competition with a new doubles teammate, Florian Müller.

== Luge results ==
All results are sourced from the International Luge Federation (FIL).

=== World Cup ===
Season	Doubles									Sprint				Team relay						Points	Overall	Doubles	Sprint
Season	1	2	3	4	5	6	7	8	9	1	2	3	4	1	2	3	4	5	6	Points	Overall	Doubles	Sprint
2010–11	6	4	6	10	6	3	3	4	3	—N/a	—N/a	—N/a	—N/a	–	–	–	–	–	3	516	4th	4th	—N/a
2011–12	5	4	3	3	1	4	2	5	3	—N/a	—N/a	—N/a	—N/a	–	–	–	1	–	–	630	3rd	3rd	—N/a
2012–13	2	2	3	8	2	1	2	7	13	—N/a	—N/a	—N/a	—N/a	–	–	–	–	–	–	628	2nd	2nd	—N/a
2013–14	2	1	21	2	3	2	1	2	–	—N/a	—N/a	—N/a	—N/a	1	–	–	–	–	–	630	2nd	2nd	—N/a
2014–15	1	1	1	2	2	1	2	2	7	1	2	1	—N/a	1	–	–	1	–	–	1071	1st	1st	1st
2015–16	1	1	2	1	21	2	12	1	1	3	2	2	—N/a	1	7	–	–	1	4	962	2nd	2nd	2nd
2016–17	1	1	1	3	2	1	2	1	1	1	1	1	—N/a	7	–	2	–	1	1	1140	1st	1st	1st
2017–18	1	1	1	1	1	2	1	1	1	2	1	DNF	1	1	1	1	DSQ	1	2	1170	1st	1st	—N/a
2018–19	2	1	2	1	1	1	2	2	2	5	1	3	—N/a	2	–	1	3	–	2	1050	1st	1st	1st
2019–20	1	2	1	2	8	3	6	–	1	2	1	5	—N/a	3	2	–	–	–	1	872	1st	1st	2nd
2020–21	3	2	1	2	1	22	4	5	4	15	1	3	—N/a	1	4	1	2	–	CNX	830	3rd	2nd	3rd
2021–22	1	4	2	2	13	DNF	1	1	1	7	1	2	—N/a	7	–	1	–	1	2	907	1st	1st	2nd
2022–23	4	1	1	4	5	1	2	2	2	5	2	2	—N/a	1	–	–	2	–	–	955	2nd	2nd	2nd
