= Sascha Benecken =

German luger (born 1990)

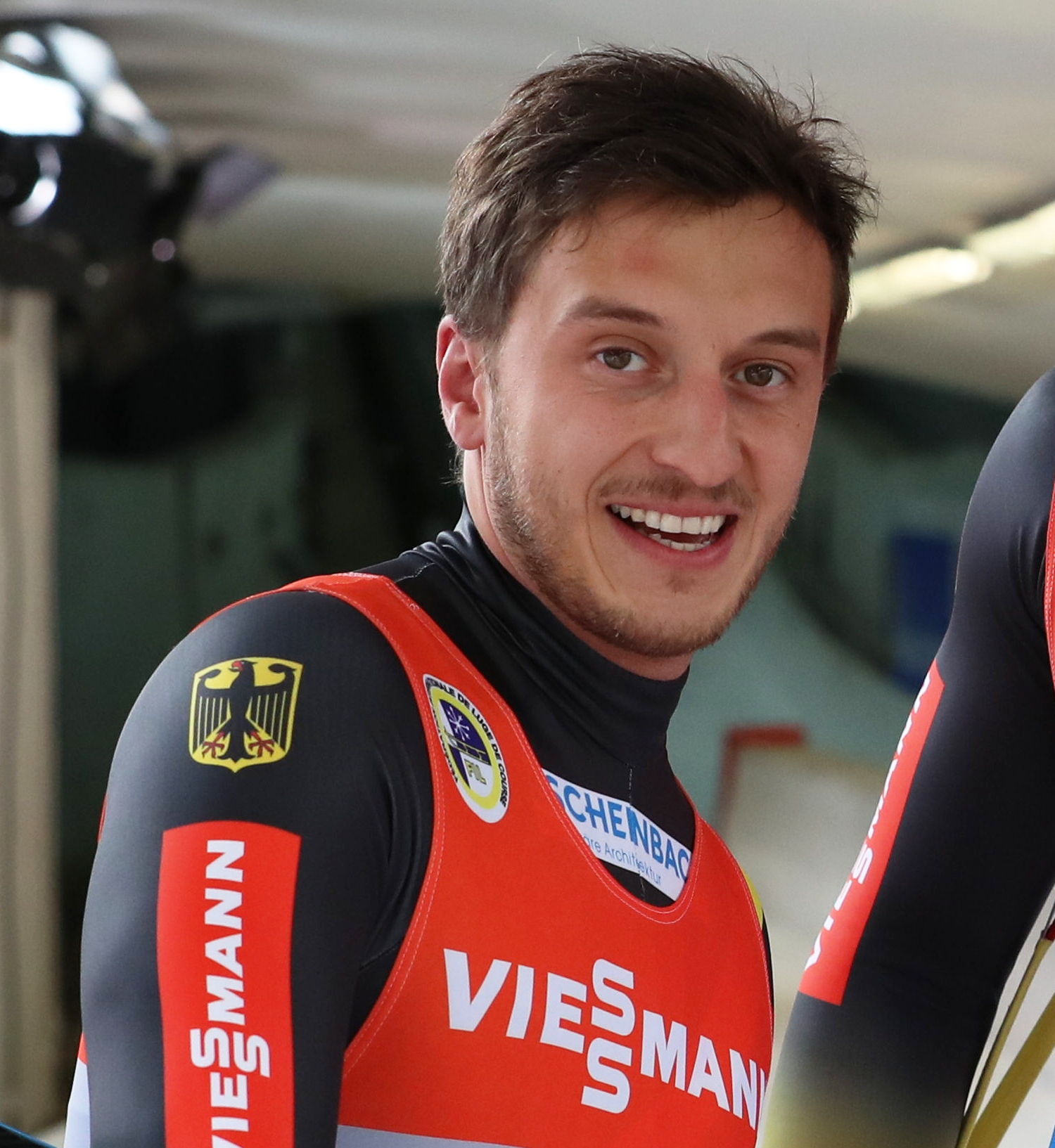
- Benecken in 2018

Personal information
- Nationality: German
- Born: 14 February 1990 (age 36) Suhl, East Germany
- Height: 1.78 m (5 ft 10 in)
- Weight: 74 kg (163 lb)

Sport
- Country: Germany
- Sport: Luge
- Event: Doubles
- Club: Rodelteam Suhl SV EGS 48 e.V.
Medal record
Men's luge
Representing Germany
Olympic Games
Silver medal – second place	2022 Beijing	Doubles
Bronze medal – third place	2018 Pyeongchang	Doubles
World Championships
Gold medal – first place	2012 Altenberg	Team relay
Gold medal – first place	2017 Igls	Doubles
Gold medal – first place	2017 Igls	Team relay
Gold medal – first place	2019 Winterberg	Doubles
Gold medal – first place	2019 Winterberg	Doubles' sprint
Gold medal – first place	2020 Sochi	Doubles
Gold medal – first place	2020 Sochi	Team relay
Gold medal – first place	2021 Königssee	Doubles
Gold medal – first place	2023 Oberhof	Doubles
Gold medal – first place	2023 Oberhof	Doubles' sprint
Gold medal – first place	2023 Oberhof	Team relay
Silver medal – second place	2012 Altenberg	Doubles
Silver medal – second place	2013 Whistler	Doubles
Silver medal – second place	2016 Königssee	Doubles
Silver medal – second place	2021 Königssee	Team relay
Bronze medal – third place	2017 Igls	Doubles' sprint
Bronze medal – third place	2019 Winterberg	Team relay
Bronze medal – third place	2021 Königssee	Doubles' sprint
European Championships
Gold medal – first place	2013 Oberhof	Doubles
Gold medal – first place	2013 Oberhof	Team relay
Gold medal – first place	2016 Altenberg	Doubles
Gold medal – first place	2016 Altenberg	Team relay
Gold medal – first place	2018 Sigulda	Doubles
Gold medal – first place	2022 St. Moritz	Doubles
Silver medal – second place	2017 Königssee	Doubles
Silver medal – second place	2018 Sigulda	Team relay
Silver medal – second place	2019 Oberhof	Doubles
Silver medal – second place	2022 St. Moritz	Team relay
Bronze medal – third place	2012 Paramonovo	Doubles
World Cup
Event	1st	2nd	3rd
Doubles	43	32	11
Sprint	11	8	3
Team relay	19	8	3
Total	73	48	17
- Updated as of 26 February, 2023

Sascha Benecken (born 14 February 1990) is a retired German luger who has competed since 1999. With his doubles partner Toni Eggert he has been world champion ten times and won the overall World Cup six times.

== Early life ==
His father was part of East Germany's junior national team in the Nordic Skiing. As a result, he took part in a play and sports group as early as kindergarten, from which he then switched to handball and in 1999, after a sighting in physical education, to luge. In February 2003, Sascha Benecken moved to the sports high school in Oberhof and to the boarding school there. In June 2009 he passed his Abitur and successfully applied to the federal police, where he completed his training in the middle police enforcement service to become a police master at the federal police sports school in Bad Endorf by October 2013.

== Junior Career ==
In the fall of 2005, Benecken qualified individually for three Youth A World Cups, all of which he was able to win. From then on he only competed in singles. He qualified for the Junior World Cup in 2006, although he was still eligible to start for youth A, and with his first Junior World Cup win on January 13, 2007 he made it to the Junior World Championships, where he finished sixth on the Olympic track in Cesana.

Benecken became part of the junior national team and won the overall junior world cup in 2008 and again fought for 6th place at the junior world championships at Lake Placid. In 2009 he was both Junior Vice World Champion and overall World Cup runner-up. On January 31, 2010 he won bronze at his fourth and last Junior World Championships in Innsbruck-Igls and thus recommended himself as a B squad qualifier for the German national luge team.

On the 22nd of August 2023, Benecken, in conjunction with his doubles collaborator Eggert, officially declared their retirement from active involvement in competitive sports.

== Luge results ==
All results are sourced from the International Luge Federation (FIL).

=== World Cup ===
Season	Doubles									Sprint				Team relay						Points	Overall	Doubles	Sprint
Season	1	2	3	4	5	6	7	8	9	1	2	3	4	1	2	3	4	5	6	Points	Overall	Doubles	Sprint
2010–11	6	4	6	10	6	3	3	4	3	—N/a	—N/a	—N/a	—N/a	–	–	–	–	–	3	516	4th	4th	—N/a
2011–12	5	4	3	3	1	4	2	5	3	—N/a	—N/a	—N/a	—N/a	–	–	–	1	–	–	630	3rd	3rd	—N/a
2012–13	2	2	3	8	2	1	2	7	13	—N/a	—N/a	—N/a	—N/a	–	–	–	–	–	–	628	2nd	2nd	—N/a
2013–14	2	1	21	2	3	2	1	2	–	—N/a	—N/a	—N/a	—N/a	1	–	–	–	–	–	630	2nd	2nd	—N/a
2014–15	1	1	1	2	2	1	2	2	7	1	2	1	—N/a	1	–	–	1	–	–	1071	1st	1st	1st
2015–16	1	1	2	1	21	2	12	1	1	3	2	2	—N/a	1	7	–	–	1	4	962	2nd	2nd	2nd
2016–17	1	1	1	3	2	1	2	1	1	1	1	1	—N/a	7	–	2	–	1	1	1140	1st	1st	1st
2017–18	1	1	1	1	1	2	1	1	1	2	1	DNF	1	1	1	1	DSQ	1	2	1170	1st	1st	—N/a
2018–19	2	1	2	1	1	1	2	2	2	5	1	3	—N/a	2	–	1	3	–	2	1050	1st	1st	1st
2019–20	1	2	1	2	8	3	6	–	1	2	1	5	—N/a	3	2	–	–	–	1	872	1st	1st	2nd
2020–21	3	2	1	2	1	22	4	5	4	15	1	3	—N/a	1	4	1	2	–	CNX	830	3rd	2nd	3rd
2021–22	1	4	2	2	13	DNF	1	1	1	7	1	2	—N/a	7	–	1	–	1	2	907	1st	1st	2nd
2022–23	4	1	1	4	5	1	2	2	2	5	2	2	—N/a	1	–	–	2	–	–	955	2nd	2nd	2nd
