= Vladislav Antonov =

Russian luger (born 1991)

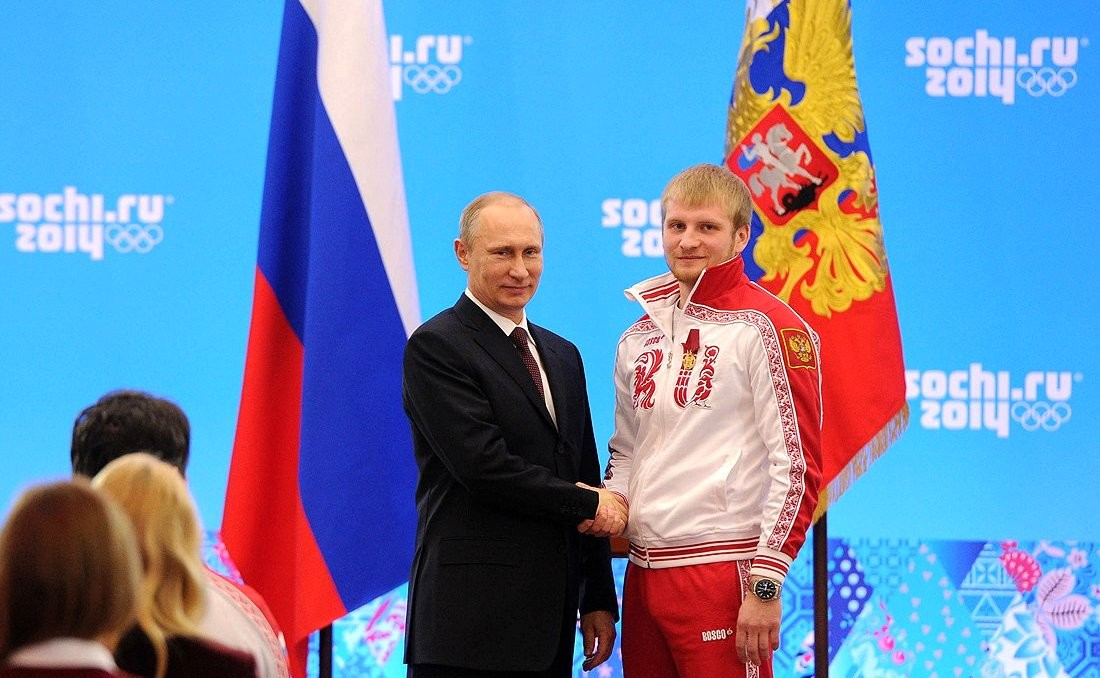
- Antonov in 2014

Personal information
- Full name: Vladislav Nikolayevich Antonov
- Nationality: Russian
- Born: 21 September 1991 (age 34) Krasnoyarsk, RSFSR, USSR (now Russia)
- Height: 1.79 m (5 ft 10 in)
- Weight: 80 kg (176 lb)

Sport
- Country: Russia
- Sport: Luge
- Event: Doubles
Medal record
Men's luge
Representing Russia
Olympic Games
Silver medal – second place	2014 Sochi	Mixed team
World Championships
Gold medal – first place	2020 Sochi	Sprint
Silver medal – second place	2020 Sochi	Doubles
Bronze medal – third place	2017 Igls	Mixed team
European Championships
Gold medal – first place	2018 Sigulda	Mixed team
Gold medal – first place	2020 Lillehammer	Doubles
Silver medal – second place	2015 Sochi	Mixed team
Bronze medal – third place	2016 Altenberg	Mixed team

Vladislav Nikolayevich Antonov (Russian: Владислав Николаевич Антонов; born 21 September 1991) is a Russian luger. Antonov, together with Alexander Denisyev, participated in the doubles and in team relay competitions at the 2014 Winter Olympics. Denisyev and Antonov placed fifth in the doubles, and, together with Tatiana Ivanova and Albert Demchenko they won the silver medal in the team relay.

Antonov was later stripped of that medal by the International Olympic Committee, after Albert Demchenko and Tatiana Ivanova were banned for doping violations on 22 December 2017, and the results of the Russian team were annulled. On 1 February 2018, their results were restored as a result of the successful appeal.

He and Alexander Denisyev became the first Russians in post-Soviet era to win a WC stage, doing this in the Sochi stage of the 2018–19 Luge World Cup.

== World Cup podiums ==
Season	Date	Location	Discipline	Place
2016–17	4 February 2017	Oberhof, Germany	Team relay	2nd
2017–18	18 November 2017	Innsbruck, Austria	Team relay	3rd
2017–18	27 January 2018	Sigulda, Latvia	Team relay	1st
2018–19	23 February 2019	Sochi, Russia	Doubles	1st
2018–19	24 February 2019	Sochi, Russia	Doubles (sprint)	1st
2018–19	24 February 2019	Sochi, Russia	Team relay	1st
2019–20	11 January 2020	Altenberg, Germany	Doubles	3rd
2019–20	12 January 2020	Altenberg, Germany	Team Telay	1st
2019–20	18 January 2020	Lillehammer, Norway	Doubles	1st
2019–20	23 February 2020	Winterberg, Germany	Doubles	1st
2019–20	23 February 2020	Winterberg, Germany	Team Relay	1st
2020–21	6 December 2020	Altenberg, Germany	Team Relay	2nd
