= 2021 FIL World Luge Championships =

International luge competition

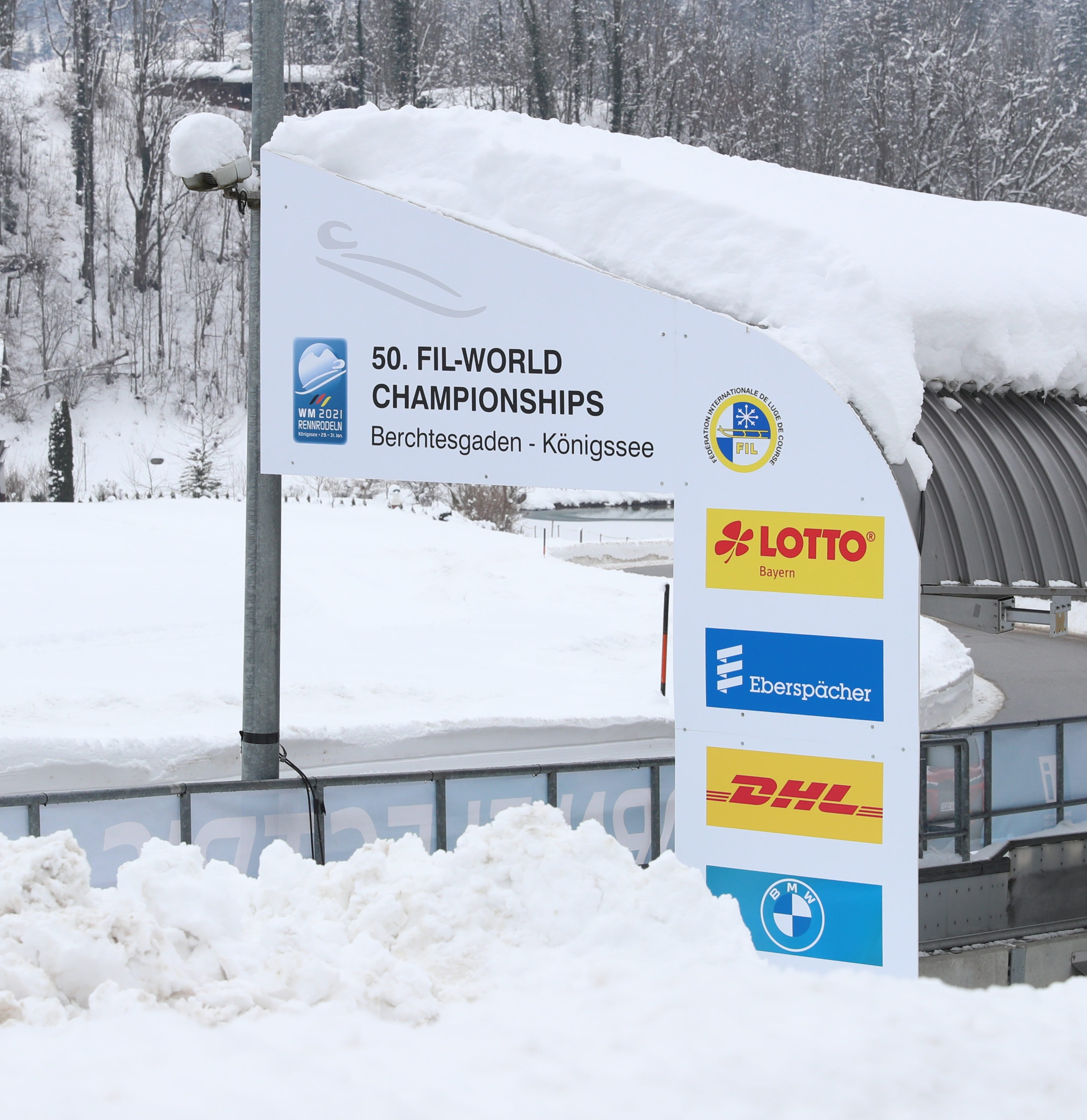
- Venue: Königssee, Germany
- Dates: 29–31 January

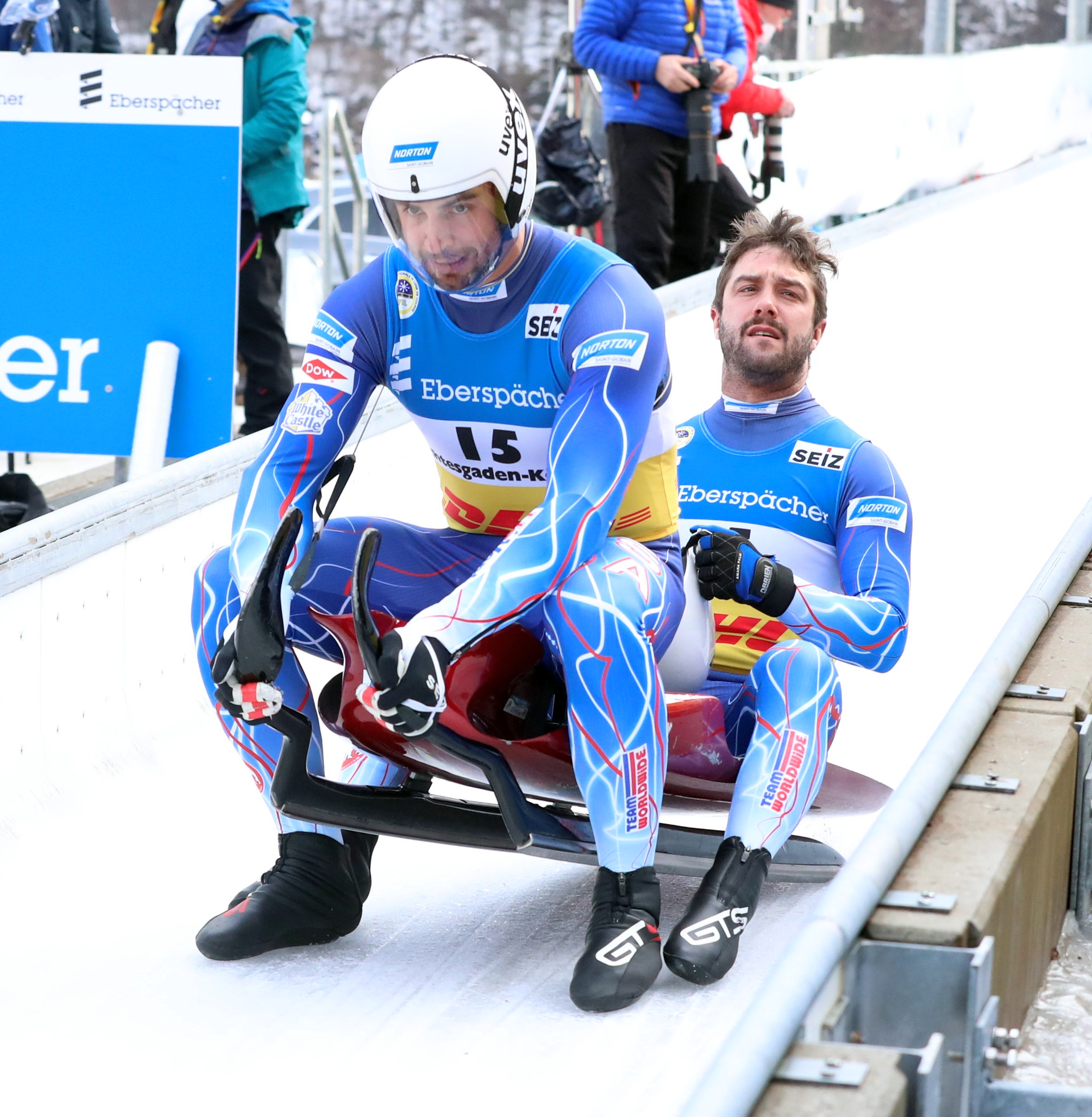
2021-01-30 Doubles at the FIL World Luge Championships Königssee 2021 by Sandro Halank–165

The 2021 50th FIL World Luge Championships were held from 29 to 31 January 2021 in Königssee, Germany. They were originally awarded to Canada, but were moved because of the COVID-19 pandemic.

== Russia doping ban ==
On 9 December 2019, the World Anti-Doping Agency (WADA) banned Russia from all international sport for a period of four years, after the Russian government was found to have tampered with laboratory data that it provided to WADA in January 2019 as a condition of the Russian Anti-Doping Agency being reinstated. As a result of the ban, WADA plans to allow individually cleared Russian athletes to take part in the 2021-2022 World Championships and 2022 Summer Olympics under a neutral banner, as instigated at the 2018 Winter Olympics, but they will not be permitted to compete in team sports. The title of the neutral banner has yet to be determined; WADA Compliance Review Committee head Jonathan Taylor stated that the IOC would not be able to use "Olympic Athletes from Russia" (OAR) as it did in 2018, emphasizing that neutral athletes cannot be portrayed as representing a specific country. Russia later filed an appeal to the Court of Arbitration for Sport (CAS) against the WADA decision. After reviewing the case on appeal, CAS ruled on 17 December 2020 to reduce the penalty that WADA had placed on Russia. Instead of banning Russia from sporting events, the ruling allowed Russia to participate at the Olympics and other international events, but for a period of two years, the team cannot use the Russian name, flag, or anthem and must present themselves as "Neutral Athlete" or "Neutral Team". The ruling does allow for team uniforms to display "Russia" on the uniform as well as the use of the Russian flag colors within the uniform's design, although the name should be up to equal predominance as the "Neutral Athlete/Team" designation.

== Schedule ==
Seven events were held.

All times are local (UTC+1).

Date	Time	Events
29 January	09:00	Men's sprint qualification
29 January	09:00	Doubles' sprint qualification
29 January	09:00	Women's sprint qualification
29 January	12:45	Men's sprint final
29 January	13:40	Doubles' sprint final
29 January	14:30	Women's sprint final
30 January	09:30	Doubles 1st run
30 January	10:50	Doubles 2nd run
30 January	12:50	Men 1st run
30 January	15:00	Men 2nd run
31 January	10:00	Women 1st run
31 January	11:50	Women 2nd run
31 January	13:30	Team relay

== Medal summary ==
=== Medal table ===
* Host nation (Germany)

Rank	Nation	Gold	Silver	Bronze	Total
1	Germany*	4	5	3	12
2	Austria	2	0	2	4
3	Russian Luge Federation	1	1	0	2
4	Latvia	0	1	2	3
Totals (4 entries)		7	7	7	21

=== Medalists ===
Event	Gold		Silver		Bronze	
Men's singles	Roman Repilov; Russian Luge Federation	1:37.810	Felix Loch; Germany	1:37.872	David Gleirscher; Austria	1:38.027
Men's sprint	Nico Gleirscher; Austria	38.375	Semen Pavlichenko; Russian Luge Federation	38.416	David Gleirscher; Austria	38.417
Women's singles	Julia Taubitz; Germany	1:41.132	Natalie Geisenberger; Germany	1:41.447	Dajana Eitberger; Germany	1:41.604
Women's sprint	Julia Taubitz; Germany	39.101	Anna Berreiter; Germany	39.112	Dajana Eitberger; Germany	39.300
Doubles	Germany; Toni Eggert; Sascha Benecken	1:39.931	Germany; Tobias Wendl; Tobias Arlt	1:40.086	Latvia; Andris Šics; Juris Šics	1:40.591
Doubles' sprint	Germany; Tobias Wendl; Tobias Arlt	39.126	Latvia; Andris Šics; Juris Šics	39.140	Germany; Toni Eggert; Sascha Benecken	39.161
Team relay	Austria; Madeleine Egle; David Gleirscher; Thomas Steu/Lorenz Koller	2:43.139	Germany; Julia Taubitz; Felix Loch; Toni Eggert / Sascha Benecken	2:43.177	Latvia; Kendija Aparjode; Artūrs Dārznieks; Andris Šics/Juris Šics	2:43.571
