= Simon Kainzwaldner =

Italian luger (born 1994)

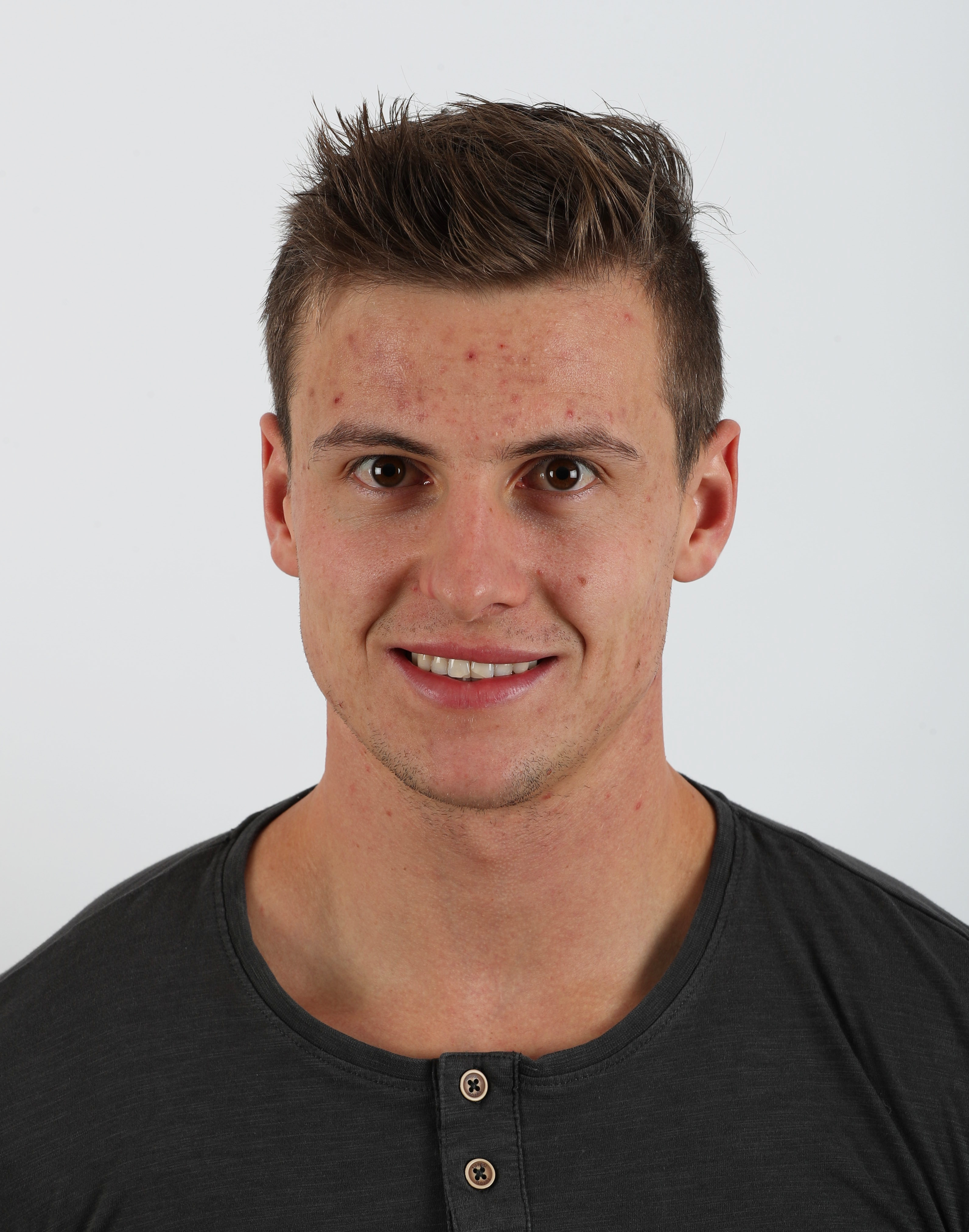
- Kainzwaldner in 2018

Personal information
- Born: 24 February 1994 (age 32) Bolzano, Italy
- Height: 1.73 m (5 ft 8 in)

Sport
- Country: Italy
- Sport: Luge
- Event: Doubles
Medal record
Men's luge
Representing Italy
Olympic Games
Gold medal – first place	2026 Milano Cortina	Doubles
Bronze medal – third place	2026 Milano Cortina	Team relay
World Championships
Silver medal – second place	2020 Sochi	Sprint
European Championships
Bronze medal – third place	2023 Sigulda	Team relay
Bronze medal – third place	2024 Igls	Team relay

Simon Kainzwaldner (born 24 February 1994) is an Italian Olympic luge athlete who currently races for his nation on the World Cup circuit in the Men's doubles event as a pair with Emanuel Rieder.

== Life and career ==
At the 2012 Youth Winter Olympics in Innsbruck, Austria, he represented Italy in the Boys' singles and doubles luge events as well as the mixed team relay event. Kainzwaldner finished with the gold in tandem with his racing partner Florian Gruber in the doubles, 10th in the boys singles, and with his teammates Andrea Voetter, Daniel Gatterer, and Florian Gruber, and fifth in the mixed relay competition. Kainzwaldner and Gruber have remained a doubles pair in international luge competition ever since their appearance in the Boys division and finished in tenth place in the 2014–15 Luge World Cup standings, including a fifth-place showing in the opening race at Innsbruck.

At the 2026 Winter Olympics, Kainzwaldner won a gold medal in the doubles event, along with Emanuel Rieder. He also won a bronze medal in the team relay.
