= Emanuel Rieder =

Italian luger (born 1993)

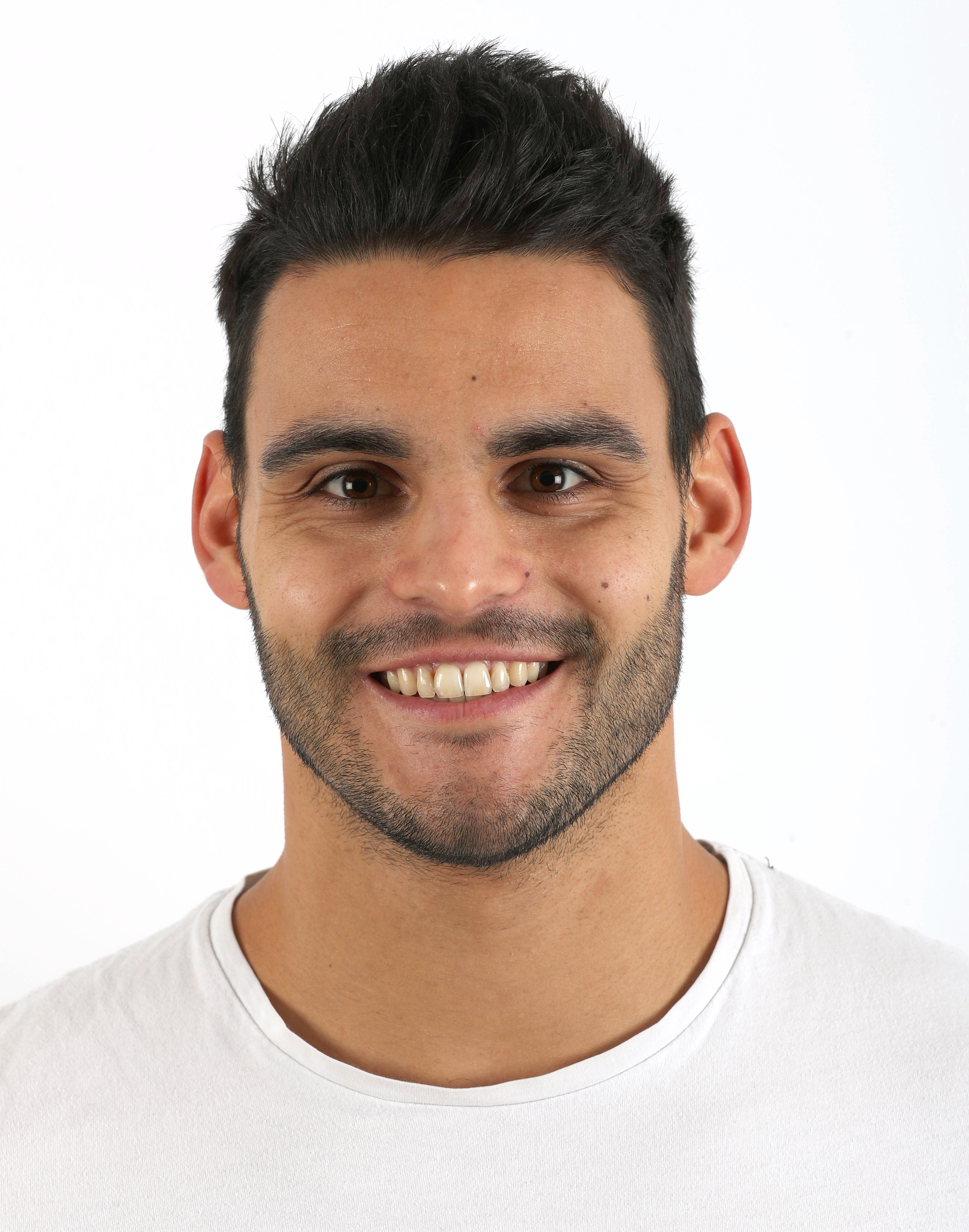
- Rieder in 2018

Personal information
- Nationality: Italian
- Born: 1 October 1993 (age 32) Brixen, Italy
- Height: 1.79 m (5 ft 10 in)
- Weight: 82 kg (181 lb)

Sport
- Country: Italy
- Sport: Luge
- Event: Doubles
Medal record
Men's luge
Representing Italy
Olympic Games
Gold medal – first place	2026 Milano Cortina	Doubles
Bronze medal – third place	2026 Milano Cortina	Team relay
World Championships
Silver medal – second place	2020 Sochi	Sprint
European Championships
Bronze medal – third place	2023 Sigulda	Team relay
Bronze medal – third place	2024 Igls	Team relay

Emanuel Rieder (born 1 October 1993) is an Italian luger.

== Career ==
He competed in the Men's singles luge event at the 2014 Winter Olympics in Sochi, placing 19th.

He placed 6th at the men's doubles event at the 2022 Winter Olympics.

At the 2026 Winter Olympics, Rieder won the gold medal in the doubles event, along with Simon Kainzwaldner. He also won a bronze medal in the team relay.
