= 2017 FIL World Luge Championships – Doubles =

Doubles at the 2017 FIL World Luge Championships
- Venue: Olympic Sliding Centre Innsbruck
- Location: Igls, Austria
- Dates: 28 January
- Winning time: 1:19.005

Medalists
gold medal	Toni Eggert; Sascha Benecken	Germany
silver medal	Tobias Wendl; Tobias Arlt	Germany
bronze medal	Robin Geueke; David Gamm	Germany

2017 FIL World Luge Championships
Individual	men		women
Doubles	doubles
Sprint	men	doubles	women
Relay		mixed

The Doubles competition at the 2017 World Championships was held on 28 January 2017.

== Results ==
The first run as started at 13:33 and the second run at 15:20.

Rank	Bib	Name	Country	Run 1	Rank	Run 2	Rank	Total	Diff
1st place, gold medalist(s)	2	Toni Eggert; Sascha Benecken	Germany	39.468	1	39.537	1	1:19.005	
2nd place, silver medalist(s)	5	Tobias Wendl; Tobias Arlt	Germany	39.643	3	39.568	2	1:19.211	+0.206
3rd place, bronze medalist(s)	7	Robin Geueke; David Gamm	Germany	39.629	2	39.761	4	1:19.390	+0.385
4	13	Peter Penz; Georg Fischler	Austria	39.741	5	39.658	3	1:19.399	+0.394
5	8	Ludwig Rieder; Patrick Rastner	Italy	39.703	4	39.941	11	1:19.644	+0.639
6	14	Alexander Denisyev; Vladislav Antonov	Russia	39.819	7	39.830	6	1:19.649	+0.644
7	18	Vladislav Yuzhakov; Jury Prokhorov	Russia	39.863	11	39.821	5	1:19.684	+0.679
8	10	Christian Oberstolz; Patrick Gruber	Italy	39.843	9	39.845	8	1:19.688	+0.683
9	9	Tristan Walker; Justin Snith	Canada	39.766	6	39.924	10	1:19.690	+0.685
10	12	Thomas Steu; Lorenz Koller	Austria	39.859	10	39.844	7	1:19.703	+0.698
11	6	Oskars Gudramovičs; Pēteris Kalniņs	Latvia	39.868	12	39.906	9	1:19.774	+0.769
12	15	Lukáš Brož; Antonín Brož	Czech Republic	39.924	13	40.089	13	1:20.013	+1.008
13	1	Andris Šics; Juris Šics	Latvia	39.840	8	40.183	18	1:20.023	+1.018
14	11	Justin Krewson; Andrew Sherk	United States	39.977	15	40.101	14	1:20.078	+1.073
15	4	Andrey Bogdanov; Andrey Medvedev	Russia	39.966	14	40.133	16	1:20.099	+1.094
16	27	Oleksandr Obolonchyk; Roman Zakharkiv	Ukraine	40.126	17	40.070	12	1:20.196	+1.191
17	16	Florian Gruber; Simon Kainzwalder	Italy	40.140	18	40.103	15	1:20.243	+1.238
18	17	Kristens Putins; Imants Marcinkevics	Latvia	40.116	16	40.167	17	1:20.283	+1.278
19	25	Park Jin-yong; Cho Jung-myung	South Korea	40.150	DNQ				
20	19	Wojciech Chmielewski; Jakub Kowalewski	Poland	40.171	DNQ				
21	3	Matthew Mortensen; Jayson Terdiman	United States	40.271	DNQ				
22	28	Jacob Hyrns; Anthony Espinoza	United States	40.341	DNQ				
23	21	Matěj Kvíčala; Jaromír Kudera	Czech Republic	40.342	DNQ				
24	29	Vasile Gitlan; Flavius Craciun	Romania	40.363	DNQ				
25	22	Cosmin Atodiresei; Ștefan Musei	Romania	40.409	DNQ				
26	20	Marek Solčanský; Karol Stuchlák	Slovakia	40.511	DNQ				
27	24	Roman Yefremov; Denis Tatyanchenko	Kazakhstan	40.989	DNQ				
28	23	Angel Kozak; Marian Tudor	Romania	41.098	DNQ				
29	26	Adam Rosen; Raymond Thompson	Great Britain	41.288	DNQ				
