= 2017 FIL World Luge Championships – Doubles' sprint =

Doubles' sprint at the 2017 FIL World Luge Championships
- Venue: Olympic Sliding Centre Innsbruck
- Location: Igls, Austria
- Dates: 27 January
- Competitors: 58 from 15 nations
- Teams: 29
- Winning time: 29.843

Medalists
| gold medal | Tobias Wendl; Tobias Arlt | Germany |
| silver medal | Peter Penz; Georg Fischler | Austria |
| bronze medal | Toni Eggert; Sascha Benecken | Germany |

2017 FIL World Luge Championships
| Individual | men | | women |
| Doubles | doubles |
| Sprint | men | doubles | women |
| Relay | | mixed |

The Doubles' sprint race of the 2017 FIL World Luge Championships was held on 27 January 2017.

== Results ==
A qualification was held to determine the 15 participants. The qualification run was started at 10:25 and the final run at 14:22.

| Rank | Bib | Name | Country | Qualification | | Final Run | |
| Rank | Bib | Name | Country | Time | Rank | Time | Diff |
|---|---|---|---|---|---|---|---|
| 1st place, gold medalist(s) | 14 | Tobias Wendl; Tobias Arlt | Germany | 29.931 | 2 | 29.843 | |
| 2nd place, silver medalist(s) | 19 | Peter Penz; Georg Fischler | Austria | 30.003 | 4 | 29.949 | +0.106 |
| 3rd place, bronze medalist(s) | 15 | Toni Eggert; Sascha Benecken | Germany | 29.783 | 1 | 29.956 | +0.113 |
| 4 | 6 | Thomas Steu; Lorenz Koller | Austria | 30.038 | 6 | 30.013 | +0.170 |
| 5 | 12 | Robin Geueke; David Gamm | Germany | 29.959 | 3 | 30.014 | +0.171 |
| 6 | 9 | Christian Oberstolz; Patrick Gruber | Italy | 30.136 | 10 | 30.024 | +0.181 |
| 7 | 10 | Andris Šics; Juris Šics | Latvia | 30.037 | 5 | 30.058 | +0.215 |
| 7 | 13 | Matthew Mortensen; Jayson Terdiman | United States | 30.079 | 7 | 30.058 | +0.215 |
| 9 | 4 | Alexander Denisyev; Vladislav Antonov | Russia | 30.098 | 8 | 30.129 | +0.286 |
| 10 | 5 | Tristan Walker; Justin Snith | Canada | 30.100 | 9 | 30.137 | +0.294 |
| 11 | 16 | Justin Krewson; Andrew Sherk | United States | 30.249 | 15 | 30.181 | +0.338 |
| 12 | 25 | Park Jin-yong; Cho Jung-myung | South Korea | 30.219 | 14 | 30.237 | +0.394 |
| 13 | 3 | Lukáš Brož; Antonín Brož | Czech Republic | 30.212 | 12 | 30.293 | +0.450 |
| 14 | 8 | Andrey Bogdanov; Andrey Medvedev | Russia | 30.212 | 12 | 30.352 | +0.509 |
| | 18 | Vladislav Yuzhakov; Jury Prokhorov | Russia | 30.137 | 11 | DSQ (Note: exceed Start time) | |
did not qualify
| | 17 | Florian Gruber; Simon Kainzwalder | Italy | 30.291 | 16 | | |
| | 22 | Kristens Putins; Imants Marcinkevics | Latvia | 30.333 | 17 | | |
| | 1 | Jacob Hyrns; Anthony Espinoza | United States | 30.360 | 18 | | |
| | 21 | Marek Solčanský; Karol Stuchlák | Slovakia | 30.411 | 19 | | |
| | 2 | Wojciech Chmielewski; Jakub Kowalewski | Poland | 30.420 | 20 | | |
| | 28 | Vasile Gitlan; Flavius Craciun | Romania | 30.491 | 21 | | |
| | 23 | Matěj Kvíčala; Jaromír Kudera | Czech Republic | 30.495 | 22 | | |
| | 11 | Oskars Gudramovičs; Pēteris Kalniņs | Latvia | 30.516 | 23 | | |
| | 24 | Cosmin Atodiresei; Ștefan Musei | Romania | 30.522 | 24 | | |
| | 20 | Oleksandr Obolonchyk; Roman Zakharkiv | Ukraine | 30.870 | 25 | | |
| | 26 | Adam Rosen; Raymond Thompson | Great Britain | 31.034 | 26 | | |
| | 27 | Roman Yefremov; Denis Tatyanchenko | Kazakhstan | 31.238 | 27 | | |
| | 7 | Ludwig Rieder; Patrick Rastner | Italy | 31.602 | 28 | | |
| | 29 | Angel Kozak; Marian Tudor | Romania | 32.874 | 29 | | |
