= 2015 FIL World Luge Championships – Doubles =

Doubles at the 2015 FIL World Luge Championships
- Venue: Sigulda bobsleigh, luge, and skeleton track, Sigulda
- Date: 14 February 2015
- Competitors: 46 from 13 nations
- Winning time: 1:23.900

Medalists
gold medal	Tobias Wendl; Tobias Arlt	Germany
silver medal	Peter Penz; Georg Fischler	Austria
bronze medal	Christian Oberstolz; Patrick Gruber	Italy

2015 FIL World Luge Championships
Individual	men		women
Doubles	doubles
Relay		mixed

The Doubles race of the 2015 FIL World Luge Championships was held on 14 February 2015.

== Results ==
The first run was started at 10:25 and the second run at 11:30.

Rank	Bib	Name	Country	Run 1	Rank	Run 2	Rank	Total	Diff
1st place, gold medalist(s)	12	Tobias Wendl; Tobias Arlt	Germany	41.929	1	41.971	1	1:23.900	
2nd place, silver medalist(s)	1	Peter Penz; Georg Fischler	Austria	41.988	2	42.048	2	1:24.036	+0.136
3rd place, bronze medalist(s)	10	Christian Oberstolz; Patrick Gruber	Italy	42.066	4	42.091	3	1:24.157	+0.257
4	11	Toni Eggert; Sascha Benecken	Germany	42.058	3	42.211	6	1:24.269	+0.369
5	7	Ludwig Rieder; Patrick Rastner	Italy	42.139	5	42.179	4	1:24.318	+0.418
6	9	Andris Šics; Juris Šics	Latvia	42.152	6	42.197	5	1:24.349	+0.449
7	8	Andrey Bogdanov; Andrey Medvedev	Russia	42.196	7	42.219	7	1:24.415	+0.515
8	6	Vladislav Yuzhakov; Vladimir Prokhorov	Russia	42.257	8	42.339	11	1:24.596	+0.696
9	3	Matthew Mortensen; Jayson Terdiman	United States	42.318	9	42.294	9	1:24.612	+0.712
10	5	Oskars Gudramovičs; Pēteris Kalniņš	Latvia	42.363	10	42.276	8	1:24.639	+0.739
11	13	Tristan Walker; Justin Snith	Canada	42.722	15	42.301	10	1:25.023	+1.123
12	14	Lukáš Brož; Antonín Brož	Czech Republic	42.463	11	42.632	12	1:25.095	+1.195
13	15	Matěj Kvíčala; Jaromír Kudera	Czech Republic	42.709	14	42.685	13	1:25.394	+1.494
14	2	Florian Gruber; Simon Kainzwalder	Italy	42.487	12	43.004	16	1:25.491	+1.591
15	16	Park Jin-yong; Cho Jung-myung	South Korea	42.777	16	42.810	14	1:25.587	+1.687
16	20	Thomas Steu; Lorenz Koller	Austria	42.822	18	42.902	15	1:25.724	+1.824
17	22	Artur Gędzius; Jakub Kowalewski	Poland	42.820	17	52.265	17	1:35.085	+11.185
18	17	Kristens Putins; Karlis Matuzels	Latvia	43.124	19			43.124	
19	21	Oleksandr Obolonchyk; Roman Zakharkiv	Ukraine	43.413	20			43.413	
20	18	Jakub Šimoňák; Patrik Tomasko	Slovakia	44.950	21			44.950	
21	23	Cosmin Atodiresei; Ștefan Musei	Romania	46.100	22			46.100	
22	19	Patryk Poreba; Karol Mikrut	Poland	51.440	23			51.440	
–	4	Alexandr Deniseyev; Vladislav Antonov	Russia	42.580	13	DNF			
