= 2013–14 Luge World Cup =

International luge competition

Winners
- Men's singles: (Germany) Felix Loch
- Doubles: (Germany) Tobias Wendl / Tobias Arlt
- Women's singles: (Germany) Natalie Geisenberger
- Team relay: Germany

Competitions
- Venues: 9

The 2013–14 Luge World Cup was a multi race tournament over a season for luge organised by the FIL. The season started on 16 November 2013 in Lillehammer, Norway and ended on 26 January 2014 in Sigulda, Latvia. After the World Cup, the athletes moved for two weeks to Sochi for the Luge event in the XXII Olympic Winter Games.

The defending individual World Champions were Felix Loch and Natalie Geisenberger, both from Germany. Athletes from Germany dominated the 2012–13 World Cup season, as they were also the defending World Champions in Men's Double (Tobias Wendl/Tobias Arlt) and Team relay.

== Calendar ==
Below is the schedule for the 2013/14 season.

Venue	Date	Details
(Norway) Lillehammer	16–17 November 2013	no Team relay
(Austria) Innsbruck	23–24 November 2013	
(Germany) Winterberg	30 November–1 December 2013	
(Canada) Whistler	6–7 December 2013	
(United States) Park City	13–14 December 2013	
(Germany) Königssee	4–5 January 2014	
(Germany) Oberhof	11–12 January 2014	no Team relay
(Germany) Altenberg	18–19 January 2014	
(Latvia) Sigulda	25–26 January 2014	no Team relay

== Results ==
=== Men's singles ===
Event:	Gold:	Time	Silver:	Time	Bronze:	Time
Lillehammer	Dominik Fischnaller; Italy	1:38.346; 49.172 / 49.174	David Möller; Germany	1:38.492; 49.243 / 49.249	Felix Loch; Germany	1:38.497; 49.260 / 49.237
Innsbruck	Felix Loch; Germany	1:40.878; 50.495 / 50.383	David Möller; Germany	1:41.052; 50.569 / 50.483	Dominik Fischnaller; Italy	1:41.102; 50.630 / 50.472
Winterberg	Chris Eibler; Germany	52.938	Armin Zöggeler; Italy	52.982	David Möller; Germany	52.994
Whistler	Felix Loch; Germany	1:36.686; 48.258 / 48.428	Chris Mazdzer; United States	1:36.978; 48.457 / 48.521	Dominik Fischnaller; Italy	1:36.981; 48.475 / 48.506
Park City	Armin Zöggeler; Italy	1:30.599; 45.292 / 45.307	Chris Mazdzer; United States	1:30.839; 45.530 / 45.309	Wolfgang Kindl; Austria	1:30.923; 45.590 / 45.333
Königssee	Felix Loch; Germany	1:38.266; 48.982 / 49.284	Armin Zöggeler; Italy	1:39.129; 49.403 / 49.726	Gregory Carigiet; Switzerland	1:39.203; 49.453 / 49.750
Oberhof	Felix Loch; Germany	1:26.957; 43.510 / 43.447	Andi Langenhan; Germany	1:27.152; 43.620 / 43.532	Julian von Schleinitz; Germany	1:27.523; 43.771 / 43.752
Altenberg	Felix Loch; Germany	1:48.921; 54.626 / 54.295	Albert Demtschenko; Russia	1:49.223; 54.435 / 54.788	Andi Langenhan; Germany	1:49.479; 54.693 / 54.786
Sigulda	Armin Zöggeler; Italy	1:35.913; 47.969 / 47.944	Johannes Ludwig; Germany	1:36.019; 47.988 / 48.031	Dominik Fischnaller; Italy	1:36.226; 48.073 / 48.153

Race shortened to one run due to snowfall.

=== Doubles ===
Event:	Gold:	Time	Silver:	Time	Bronze:	Time
Lillehammer	Tobias Wendl; Tobias Arlt; Germany	1:35.490; 47.655 / 47.835	Toni Eggert; Sascha Benecken; Germany	1:35.509; 47.787 / 47.722	Andreas Linger; Wolfgang Linger; Austria	1:35.612; 47.769 / 47.843
Innsbruck	Toni Eggert; Sascha Benecken; Germany	1:21.016; 40.422 / 40.594	Tobias Wendl; Tobias Arlt; Germany	1:21.099; 40.515 / 40.584	Peter Penz; Georg Fischler; Austria	1:21.299; 40.650 / 40.649
Winterberg	Tobias Wendl; Tobias Arlt; Germany	1:27.491; 43.708 / 43.783	Christian Oberstolz; Patrick Gruber; Italy	1:28.040; 44.071 / 43.969	Ludwig Rieder; Patrick Rastner; Italy	1:28.097; 44.099 / 43.998
Winterberg	Tobias Wendl; Tobias Arlt; Germany	1:27.491; 43.708 / 43.783	Christian Oberstolz; Patrick Gruber; Italy	1:28.040; 44.071 / 43.969	Peter Penz; Georg Fischler; Austria	1:28.097; 44.105 / 43.992
Whistler	Tobias Wendl; Tobias Arlt; Germany	1:13.087; 36.522 / 36.565	Toni Eggert; Sascha Benecken; Germany	1:13.171; 36.608 / 36.563	Peter Penz; Georg Fischler; Austria	1:13.351; 36.675 / 36.676
Park City	Tobias Wendl; Tobias Arlt; Germany	1:27.326; 43.517 / 43.809	Andreas Linger; Wolfgang Linger; Austria	1:27.488; 43.780 / 43.708	Toni Eggert; Sascha Benecken; Germany	1:27.547; 43.746 / 43.801
Königssee	Tobias Wendl; Tobias Arlt; Germany	1:39.956; 49.995 / 50.001	Toni Eggert; Sascha Benecken; Germany	1:40.253; 50.083 / 50.170	Tristan Walker; Justin Snith; Canada	1:40.709; 50.359 / 50.350
Oberhof	Toni Eggert; Sascha Benecken; Germany	1:23.212; 41.509 / 41.703	Tobias Wendl; Tobias Arlt; Germany	1:23.591; 41.781 / 41.810	Vladislav Yuzhakov; Vladimir Makhnutin; Russia	1:23.609; 41.686 / 41.923
Altenberg	Tobias Wendl; Tobias Arlt; Germany	1:23.789; 41.853 / 41.936	Toni Eggert; Sascha Benecken; Germany	1:24.006; 42.104 / 41.904	Peter Penz; Georg Fischler; Austria	1:24.121; 42.116 / 42.005
Sigulda	Christian Oberstolz; Patrick Gruber; Italy	1:23.388; 41.696 / 41.692	Vladislav Yuzhakov; Vladimir Makhnutin; Russia	1:23.434; 41.697 / 41.737	Andreas Linger; Wolfgang Linger; Austria	1:23.467; 41.775 / 41.692

=== Women's singles ===
Event:	Gold:	Time	Silver:	Time	Bronze:	Time
Lillehammer	Natalie Geisenberger; Germany	1.35.847; 47.964 / 47.883	Tatiana Ivanova; Russia	1.36.031; 47.968 / 48.063	Alex Gough; Canada	1.36.233; 48.121 / 48.112
Innsbruck	Natalie Geisenberger; Germany	1:20.135; 40.128 / 40.007	Tatjana Hüfner; Germany	1:20.167; 40.144 / 40.023	Anke Wischnewski; Germany	1:20.311; 40.187 / 40.124
Winterberg	Natalie Geisenberger; Germany	1:53.457; 56.998 / 56.459	Tatjana Hüfner; Germany	1:53.897; 57.265 / 56.632	Anke Wischnewski; Germany	1:54.101; 57.407 / 56.694
Whistler	Natalie Geisenberger; Germany	1:13.412; 36.720 / 36.692	Alex Gough; Canada	1:13.545; 36.765 / 36.780	Anke Wischnewski; Germany	1:13.622; 36.832 / 36.790
Park City	Natalie Geisenberger; Germany	1:27.628; 43.826 / 43.802	Anke Wischnewski; Germany	1:27.821; 43.974 / 43.847	Alex Gough; Canada	1:27.88; 43.980 / 43.909
Königssee	Natalie Geisenberger; Germany	1:40.591; 50.389 / 50.202	Tatjana Hüfner; Germany	1:40.696; 50.281 / 50.415	Alex Gough; Canada	1:40.922; 50.463 / 50.459
Oberhof	Tatjana Hüfner; Germany	1:23.925; 41.995 / 41.930	Natalie Geisenberger; Germany	1:23.941; 41.998 / 41.943	Dajana Eitberger; Germany	1:24.316; 42.038 / 42.278
Altenberg	Natalie Geisenberger; Germany	1:46.332; 52.895 / 53.437	Alex Gough; Canada	1:47.006; 53.559 / 53.447	Kimberley McRae; Canada	1:47.030; 53.441 / 53.589
Sigulda	Kate Hansen; United States	1:23.976; 42.089 / 41.887	Alex Gough; Canada	1:24.052; 42.014 / 42.038	Natalia Khoreva; Russia	1:24.155; 42.176 / 41.979

=== Team relay ===
Event:	Gold:	Time	Silver:	Time	Bronze:	Time
Innsbruck	Natalie Geisenberger; Felix Loch; Toni Eggert; Sascha Benecken; Germany	2:11.798; 42.378/44.622/44.798	Alex Gough; Samuel Edney; Tristan Walker; Justin Snith; Canada	2:12.172; 42.703/44.602/44.867	Sandra Gasparini; Dominik Fischnaller; Christian Oberstolz; Patrick Gruber; Italy	2:12.266; 42.775/44.643/44.848
Winterberg	Sandra Gasparini; Dominik Fischnaller; Christian Oberstolz; Patrick Gruber; Italy	2:25.874; 47.699/49.027/49.148	Kate Hansen; Tucker West; Christian Niccum; Jayson Terdiman; United States	2:26.380; 47.914/49.113/49.353	Nina Reithmayer; Daniel Pfister; Peter Penz; Georg Fischler; Austria	2:27.041; 47.810/49.095/50.136
Whistler	Natalie Geisenberger; Felix Loch; Tobias Wendl; Tobias Arlt; Germany	2:03.791; 39.918/41.932/41.941	Alex Gough; Samuel Edney; Tristan Walker; Justin Snith; Canada	2:04.202; 39.971/42.084/42.147	Nina Reithmayer; Reinhard Egger; Andreas Linger; Wolfgang Linger; Austria	2:04.686; 40.318/42.150/42.218
Park City	Natalie Geisenberger; Felix Loch; Tobias Wendl; Tobias Arlt; Germany	2:18.546	Kate Hansen; Chris Mazdzer; Matthew Mortensen; Preston Griffall; United States	2:19.128	Nina Reithmayer; Wolfgang Kindl; Andreas Linger; Wolfgang Linger; Austria	2:19.183
Königssee	Natalie Geisenberger; Felix Loch; Tobias Wendl; Tobias Arlt; Germany	2:42.781	Alex Gough; Samuel Edney; Tristan Walker; Justin Snith; Canada	2:44.499	Sandra Gasparini; Dominik Fischnaller; Ludwig Rieder; Patrick Rastner; Italy	2:44.681
Altenberg	Tatiana Ivanova; Albert Demtschenko; Vladislav Yuzhakov; Vladimir Makhnutin; Russia	2:25.570	Alex Gough; Samuel Edney; Tristan Walker; Justin Snith; Canada	2:26.191	Natalie Geisenberger; Felix Loch; Tobias Wendl; Tobias Arlt; Germany	2:26.303

== Standings ==
=== Men's singles ===
Luge Men FIL Ranking 2013/14
Pos.	Luger	LIL	IGL	WIN	WHI	PKC	KON	OBE	ALT	SIG	Points
1.	Felix Loch (GER)	3	1	4	1	5	1	1	1	—	685
2.	Armin Zöggeler (ITA)	4	5	2	10	1	2	22	5	1	595
3.	Dominik Fischnaller (ITA)	1	3	5	3	4	4	9	28	3	534
4.	David Möller (GER)	2	2	3	4	6	6	5	4	—	515
5.	Chris Mazdzer (USA)	14	4	15	2	2	21	18	9	7	412
6.	Andi Langenhan (GER)	13	9	11	5	15	8	2	3	—	381
7.	Samuel Edney (CAN)	20	6	6	6	8	5	20	6	10	375
8.	Wolfgang Kindl (AUT)	5	11	21	14	3	19	7	13	11	339
9.	Reinhard Egger (AUT)	29	8	18	8	10	7	6	11	13	315
10.	Gregory Carigiet (SUI)	11	16	10	7	18	3	17	7	22	304
11.	Daniel Pfister (AUT)	6	7	29	12	9	9	dnf	12	15	284
12.	Johannes Ludwig (GER)	24	12	17	13	10	26	—	8	2	281
13.	Mārtiņš Rubenis (LAT)	8	17	19	25	13	—	8	17	4	268
14.	Albert Demchenko (RUS)	7	10	30	—	—	dnf	4	2	dns	253
15.	Thor Haug Norbech (NOR)	25	25	13	9	7	—	24	10	9	239
16.	Alexandr Peretjagin (RUS)	10	21	7	—	—	12	23	16	6	227
17.	Inars Kivlenieks (LAT)	18	20	24	22	23	11	12	25	16	205
18.	Emanuel Rieder (ITA)	19	13	8	—	—	13	—	22	28	192
19.	Kristaps Mauriņš (LAT)	12	31	9	20	—	dnf	11	19	20	189
20.	Chris Eibler (GER)	—	—	1	15	24	17	—	—	23	185

=== Men's Doubles ===
Luge Doubles FIL Ranking 2013/14
Pos.	Luger	LIL	IGL	WIN	WHI	PKC	KON	OBE	ALT	SIG	Points
1.	Tobias Wendl / Tobias Arlt (GER)	1	2	1	1	1	1	2	1	—	770
2.	Toni Eggert / Sascha Benecken (GER)	2	1	dnf	2	3	2	1	2	—	630
3.	Christian Oberstolz / Patrick Gruber (ITA)	4	4	2	8	5	6	4	10	1	548
4.	Peter Penz / Georg Fischler (AUT)	9	3	3	3	6	4	5	3	4	544
5.	Ludwig Rieder / Patrick Rastner (ITA)	11	6	3	7	4	7	6	6	7	452
6.	Andreas Linger / Wolfgang Linger (AUT)	3	5	—	5	2	dnf	14	5	3	438
7.	Tristan Walker / Justin Snith (CAN)	19	12	5	4	8	3	8	8	8	407
8.	Vladislav Yuzhakov / Vladimir Makhnutin (RUS)	5	9	7	—	—	10	3	4	2	391
9.	Andris Šics / Juris Šics (LAT)	12	7	6	10	10	5	12	9	5	326
10.	Matthew Mortensen / Preston Griffall (USA)	13	15	17	9	9	dnf	11	16	13	267
11.	Alexandr Denisyev / Vladislav Antonov (RUS)	7	16	8	—	—	12	20	7	6	262
12.	Lukáš Brož / Antonín Brož (CZE)	14	17	26	14	14	14	10	14	10	251
13.	Christian Niccum / Jayson Terdiman (USA)	22	14	16	12	11	—	9	11	14	239
14.	Oskars Gudramovičs / Pēteris Kalniņš (LAT)	20	26	11	15	13	dnf	—	18	9	226
15.	Andrey Bogdanov / Andrey Medvedev (RUS)	15	8	21	—	—	8	13	13	15	216
16.	Marek Solcansky / Karol Stuchlak (SVK)	18	20	13	23	18	17	—	17	17	206
16.	Marian Zemanik / Jozef Petrulak (SVK)	16	19	14	16	16	16	17	—	12	206
18.	Hans Peter Fischnaller / Patrick Schwienbacher (ITA)	10	11	9	—	—	11	18	12	—	198
19.	Patryk Poreba / Karol Mikrut (POL)	21	—	—	—	—	15	16	—	22	184
20.	Matěj Kvíčala / Jaromir Kudera (CZE)	—	—	dnf	17	19	13	15	19	16	183

=== Women's singles ===
Luge Women FIL Ranking 2013/14
Pos.	Luger	LIL	IGL	WIN	WHI	PKC	KON	OBE	ALT	SIG	Points
1.	Natalie Geisenberger (GER)	1	1	1	1	1	1	2	1	—	785
2.	Alex Gough (CAN)	3	7	4	2	3	3	5	2	2	626
3.	Tatjana Hüfner (GER)	13	2	2	4	7	2	1	4	—	551
4.	Anke Wischnewski (GER)	7	3	3	3	2	7	4	7	—	493
5.	Dajana Eitberger (GER)	47	4	9	6	5	4	3	5	7	432
6.	Erin Hamlin (USA)	8	6	6	5	8	13	10	6	4	415
7.	Kate Hansen (USA)	12	23	7	7	4	15	12	21	1	384
8.	Tatiana Ivanova (RUS)	2	11	5	—	—	11	6	8	5	355
9.	Kimberley McRae (CAN)	18	24	10	11	10	5	14	3	6	349
10.	Sandra Gasparini (ITA)	6	9	18	12	12	8	13	11	13	312
11.	Natalia Khoreva (RUS)	10	13	22	13	17	14	9	15	3	302
12.	Martina Kocher (SUI)	16	14	14	19	20	6	7	9	14	287
13.	Alexandra Rodionova (RUS)	20	17	11	8	15	dnf	8	13	9	274
14.	Summer Britcher (USA)	dnf	8	36	15	9	10	16	14	12	249
15.	Elīza Tīruma (LAT)	4	18	8	18	23	dsq	—	25	11	230
16.	Ekaterina Baturina (RUS)	11	20	17	—	—	9	15	10	8	227
17.	Arianne Jones (CAN)	21	19	16	14	dsq	12	17	11	16	226
18.	Nina Reithmayer (AUT)	5	5	15	9	11	dnf	—	—	—	225
19.	Miriam Kastlunger (AUT)	15	15	20	dnf	13	17	11	27	15	217
20.	Birgit Platzer (AUT)	42	10	12	28	14	dnf	18	16	18	197

=== Team relay ===
Luge Team relay FIL Ranking 2013/14
Pos.	Team	IGL	WIN	WHI	PKC	KON	ALT	Points
1.	Germany	1	9	1	1	1	3	509
2.	Canada	2	dsq	2	4	2	2	400
3.	United States	4	2	4	2	5	6	395
4.	Italy	3	1	5	5	3	dsq	350
5.	Latvia	6	4	6	7	6	4	316
6.	Austria	5	3	3	3	dsq	9	304
7.	Russia	dsq	dnf	7	6	4	1	256
8.	Slovakia	7	dnf	8	8	7	5	231
9.	Czech Republic	9	7	dnf	9	8	7	212
10.	Poland	8	5	10	10	9	dns	208
11.	Romania	10	6	9	11	10	dnf	195
12.	South Korea	13	8	11	13	—	8	178
13.	Ukraine	11	dnf	dsq	12	—	—	66
14.	Kazakhstan	12	dnf	—	dsq	—	—	32
