= Luge at the 2018 Winter Olympics – Team relay =

Team relay at the XXIII Olympic Winter Games
- Pictogram for luge
- Venue: Alpensia Sliding Centre near Pyeongchang, South Korea
- Dates: 15 February 2018
- Competitors: 52 from 13 nations
- Winning time: 2:24.517

Medalists
1st place, gold medalist(s)		Natalie Geisenberger; Johannes Ludwig; Tobias Wendl / Tobias Arlt	Germany
2nd place, silver medalist(s)		Alex Gough; Samuel Edney; Tristan Walker / Justin Snith	Canada
3rd place, bronze medalist(s)		Madeleine Egle; David Gleirscher; Peter Penz / Georg Fischler	Austria

The team relay luge at the 2018 Winter Olympics was held on 15 February 2018 at the Alpensia Sliding Centre near Pyeongchang, South Korea.

== Qualifying teams ==
- Austria
- Canada
- Czech Republic
- Germany
- Italy
- Latvia
- Olympic Athletes from Russia
- Poland
- Romania
- Slovakia
- South Korea
- Ukraine
- United States

== Results ==
The event started at 21:30.

Rank	Bib	Athletes	Country	Women's singles	Men's singles	Men's doubles	Total	Behind
1st place, gold medalist(s)	13–1; 13–2; 13–3	Natalie Geisenberger; Johannes Ludwig; Tobias Wendl / Tobias Arlt	Germany	46.870	48.822	48.825	2:24.517	—
2nd place, silver medalist(s)	11–1; 11–2; 11–3	Alex Gough; Samuel Edney; Tristan Walker / Justin Snith	Canada	47.099	48.820	48.953	2:24.872	+0.355
3rd place, bronze medalist(s)	12–1; 12–2; 12–3	Madeleine Egle; David Gleirscher; Peter Penz / Georg Fischler	Austria	47.122	48.758	49.108	2:24.988	+0.471
4	10–1; 10–2; 10–3	Summer Britcher; Chris Mazdzer; Matthew Mortensen / Jayson Terdiman	United States	47.266	48.660	49.165	2:25.091	+0.574
5	9–1; 9–2; 9–3	Andrea Vötter; Dominik Fischnaller; Ivan Nagler / Fabian Malleier	Italy	47.078	48.827	49.188	2:25.093	+0.576
6	8–1; 8–2; 8–3	Ulla Zirne; Kristers Aparjods; Andris Šics / Juris Šics	Latvia	47.369	48.891	49.055	2:25.315	+0.798
7	7–1; 7–2; 7–3	Ekaterina Baturina; Roman Repilov; Alexander Denisyev / Vladislav Antonov	Olympic Athletes from Russia	47.523	48.615	49.211	2:25.349	+0.832
8	5–1; 5–2; 5–3	Ewa Kuls-Kusyk; Maciej Kurowski; Wojciech Chmielewski / Jakub Kowalewski	Poland	47.711	49.134	49.568	2:26.413	+1.896
9	6–1; 6–2; 6–3	Aileen Frisch; Lim Nam-kyu; Park Jin-yong / Cho Jung-myung	South Korea	47.211	49.854	49.478	2:26.543	+2.026
10	4–1; 4–2; 4–3	Raluca Strămăturaru; Valentin Crețu; Cosmin Atodiresei / Ștefan Musei	Romania	47.097	49.609	50.138	2:26.844	+2.327
11	2–1; 2–2; 2–3	Katarina Šimoňáková; Jozef Ninis; Marek Solčanský / Karol Stuchlák	Slovakia	48.032	49.326	49.635	2:26.993	+2.476
12	3–1; 3–2; 3–3	Tereza Nosková; Ondřej Hyman; Lukáš Brož / Antonín Brož	Czech Republic	48.238	49.178	49.645	2:27.061	+2.544
13	1–1; 1–2; 1–3	Olena Shkhumova; Anton Dukach; Oleksandr Obolonchyk / Roman Zakharkiv	Ukraine	51.503	49.135	50.365	2:31.003	+6.486
