= Austria at the 2018 Winter Olympics =

- Flag of Austria
- IOC code: AUT
- NOC: Austrian Olympic Committee
- Website: www.olympia.at (in German)

in Pyeongchang, South Korea 9–25 February 2018
- Competitors: 105 (65 men and 40 women) in 12 sports
- Flag bearer: Anna Veith
- Medals Ranked 10th: Gold 5 Silver 3 Bronze 6 Total 14

Winter Olympics appearances (overview)
- 1924; 1928; 1932; 1936; 1948; 1952; 1956; 1960; 1964; 1968; 1972; 1976; 1980; 1984; 1988; 1992; 1994; 1998; 2002; 2006; 2010; 2014; 2018; 2022; 2026

Austria competed at the 2018 Winter Olympics in Pyeongchang, South Korea, from 9 to 25 February 2018, with 105 competitors in 12 sports. They won 14 medals in total: five gold, three silver and six bronze; ranking 10th in the medal table.

== Medalists ==
Medal	Name	Sport	Event	Date
Gold	David Gleirscher	Luge	Men's singles	11 February
Gold	Marcel Hirscher	Alpine skiing	Men's combined	13 February
Gold	Matthias Mayer	Alpine skiing	Men's super-G	16 February
Gold	Marcel Hirscher	Alpine skiing	Men's giant slalom	18 February
Gold	Anna Gasser	Snowboarding	Women's big air	22 February
Silver	Peter Penz; Georg Fischler	Luge	Men's doubles	14 February
Silver	Anna Veith	Alpine skiing	Women's super-G	17 February
Silver	Stephanie Brunner; Manuel Feller; Katharina Gallhuber; Katharina Liensberger; Michael Matt; Marco Schwarz	Alpine skiing	Mixed team	24 February
Bronze	Lukas Klapfer	Nordic combined	Individual normal hill/10km	14 February
Bronze	Dominik Landertinger	Biathlon	Men's individual	15 February
Bronze	Madeleine Egle; David Gleirscher; Peter Penz; Georg Fischler	Luge	Team relay	15 February
Bronze	Katharina Gallhuber	Alpine skiing	Women's slalom	16 February
Bronze	Michael Matt	Alpine skiing	Men's slalom	22 February
Bronze	Wilhelm Denifl; Bernhard Gruber; Lukas Klapfer; Mario Seidl	Nordic combined	Team large hill/4 × 5 km	22 February

Medals by sport
Sport	1st place, gold medalist(s)	2nd place, silver medalist(s)	3rd place, bronze medalist(s)	Total
Alpine skiing	3	2	2	7
Luge	1	1	1	3
Nordic combined	0	0	1	1
Biathlon	0	0	1	1
Snowboarding	1	0	0	1
Total	5	3	6	14

Medals by date
Day	Date	1st place, gold medalist(s)	2nd place, silver medalist(s)	3rd place, bronze medalist(s)	Total
Day 2	10 February	0	0	0	0
Day 3	11 February	1	0	0	1
Day 4	12 February	0	0	0	0
Day 5	13 February	1	0	0	1
Day 6	14 February	0	1	1	2
Day 7	15 February	0	0	2	2
Day 8	16 February	1	0	1	2
Day 9	17 February	0	1	0	1
Day 10	18 February	1	0	0	1
Day 11	19 February	0	0	0	0
Day 12	20 February	0	0	0	0
Day 13	21 February	0	0	0	0
Day 14	22 February	1	0	2	3
Day 15	23 February	0	0	0	0
Day 16	24 February	0	1	0	1
Day 17	25 February	0	0	0	0
Total		5	3	6	14

On 22 January 2018, alpine skier Anna Veith was named as the country's flag bearer during the opening ceremony. During the announcement it was also announced the Austrian team would be composed of 105 athletes (65 men and 40 women) competing in 12 sports.

== Competitors ==
The following is the list of number of competitors participating in the delegation per sport.

Sport	Men	Women	Total
Alpine Skiing	11	11	22
Biathlon	6	3	9
Bobsleigh	8	4	12
Cross-country skiing	4	3	7
Figure skating	1	1	2
Freestyle skiing	7	5	12
Luge	7	3	10
Nordic combined	5	0	5
Skeleton	1	1	2
Ski jumping	5	3	8
Snowboarding	9	5	14
Speed skating	1	1	2
Total	65	40	105

== Alpine skiing ==
Men

Athlete	Event	Run 1		Run 2		Total	
Athlete	Event	Time	Rank	Time	Rank	Time	Rank
Stefan Brennsteiner	Giant slalom	1:10.02	14	DNF			
Manuel Feller	Giant slalom	DSQ					
Manuel Feller	Slalom	49.35	16	51.03	6	1:40.38	15
Max Franz	Downhill	—N/a				1:41.75	11
Max Franz	Super-G	—N/a				1:25.96	17
Christian Hirschbühl	Giant slalom	DNF					
Marcel Hirscher	Combined	1:20.56	12	45.96	1	2:06.52	1st place, gold medalist(s)
Marcel Hirscher	Giant slalom	1:08.27	1	1:09.77	2	2:18.04	1st place, gold medalist(s)
Marcel Hirscher	Slalom	DNF					
Vincent Kriechmayr	Downhill	—N/a				1:41.19	7
Vincent Kriechmayr	Super-G	—N/a				1:25.13	6
Vincent Kriechmayr	Combined	1:19.96	7	DNF			
Matthias Mayer	Downhill	—N/a				1:41.46	9
Matthias Mayer	Super-G	—N/a				1:24.44	1st place, gold medalist(s)
Matthias Mayer	Combined	1:19.37	3	DNF			
Michael Matt	Slalom	49.00	12	50.66	1	1:39.66	3rd place, bronze medalist(s)
Hannes Reichelt	Downhill	—N/a				1:41.76	12
Hannes Reichelt	Super-G	—N/a				1:25.40	11
Marco Schwarz	Combined	1:20.98	19	46.89	5	2:07.87	4
Marco Schwarz	Slalom	48.62	8	51.57	19	1:40.19	11

Women

Athlete	Event	Run 1		Run 2		Total	
Athlete	Event	Time	Rank	Time	Rank	Time	Rank
Stephanie Brunner	Giant slalom	1:11.53	9	DNF			
Stephanie Brunner	Slalom	DNF					
Katharina Gallhuber	Slalom	50.12	5	48.83	1	1:38.95	3rd place, bronze medalist(s)
Ricarda Haaser	Combined	1:41.75	7	43.06	14	2:24.81	13
Ricarda Haaser	Giant slalom	1:13.37	19	1:09.99	14	2:23.36	17
Cornelia Hütter	Downhill	—N/a				1:41.04	13
Cornelia Hütter	Super-G	—N/a				1:21.54	8
Katharina Liensberger	Slalom	50.43	10	50.14	8	1:40.57	8
Bernadette Schild	Giant slalom	1:14.50	28	1:10.31	19	2:24.81	24
Bernadette Schild	Slalom	49.89	8	50.29	9	1:40.18	7
Nicole Schmidhofer	Downhill	—N/a				1:41.02	12
Nicole Schmidhofer	Super-G	—N/a				1:22.30	18
Ramona Siebenhofer	Downhill	—N/a				1:40.98	10
Ramona Siebenhofer	Combined	1:40.34	4	43.11	15	2:23.45	7
Tamara Tippler	Super-G	—N/a				1:22.50	21
Anna Veith	Super-G	—N/a				1:21.12	2nd place, silver medalist(s)
Anna Veith	Giant slalom	1:12.43	15	1:09.67	10	2:22.10	12
Stephanie Venier	Downhill	—N/a				DNF	
Stephanie Venier	Slalom	DNS					

Mixed

Athlete	Event	Round of 16	Quarterfinals	Semifinals	Final / BM	
Athlete	Event	Opposition Result	Opposition Result	Opposition Result	Opposition Result	Rank
Manuel Feller; Michael Matt; Marco Schwarz; Stephanie Brunner; Katharina Gallhuber; Katharina Liensberger	Team	South Korea; W 4–0	Sweden; W 4–0	Norway; W 3–1	Switzerland; L 1–3	2nd place, silver medalist(s)

== Biathlon ==
Based on their Nations Cup rankings in the 2016–17 Biathlon World Cup, Austria has qualified 6 men and 5 women. However, they forfeited 2 female quota.

Men

Athlete	Event	Time	Misses	Rank
Julian Eberhard	Sprint	23:47.2	1 (0+1)	4
Julian Eberhard	Pursuit	34:36.9	6 (0+1+3+2)	15
Julian Eberhard	Individual	50:15.6	3 (1+1+0+1)	17
Julian Eberhard	Mass start	36:18.0	3 (1+0+1+1)	6
Tobias Eberhard	Sprint	26:24.3	5 (4+1)	77
Tobias Eberhard	Individual	53:33.6	4 (1+1+0+2)	57
Simon Eder	Sprint	24:42.5	2 (2+0)	28
Simon Eder	Pursuit	34:33.1	2 (0+0+0+2)	14
Simon Eder	Individual	49:55.8	2 (1+0+1+0)	11
Simon Eder	Mass start	37:01.0	3 (1+0+0+2)	14
Dominik Landertinger	Sprint	24:36.2	1 (1+0)	25
Dominik Landertinger	Pursuit	36:22.2	5 (0+0+1+4)	26
Dominik Landertinger	Individual	48:18.0	0 (0+0+0+0)	3rd place, bronze medalist(s)
Dominik Landertinger	Mass start	36:47.3	1 (0+0+1+0)	12
Julian Eberhard; Tobias Eberhard; Simon Eder; Dominik Landertinger	Team relay	1:18:09.0	13 (2+11)	4

Women

Athlete	Event	Time	Misses	Rank
Lisa Hauser	Sprint	23:58.9	4 (3+1)	62
Lisa Hauser	Individual	45:35.4	3 (1+1+0+1)	41
Katharina Innerhofer	Sprint	22:51.5	1 (0+1)	29
Katharina Innerhofer	Pursuit	34:41.2	5 (1+2+0+2)	40
Katharina Innerhofer	Individual	47:34.9	5 (2+1+0+2)	60
Dunja Zdouc	Sprint	23:21.0	0 (0+0)	48
Dunja Zdouc	Pursuit	38:39.1	8 (1+3+1+3)	58
Dunja Zdouc	Individual	47:09.0	2 (1+1+0+0)	58

Mixed

Athlete	Event	Time	Misses	Rank
Julian Eberhard; Simon Eder; Lisa Hauser; Katharina Innerhofer	Team relay	1:10:56.3	14 (6+8)	10

== Bobsleigh ==
Based on their rankings in the 2017–18 Bobsleigh World Cup, Austria has qualified 6 sleds.

Men

Athlete	Event	Run 1		Run 2		Run 3		Run 4		Total	
Athlete	Event	Time	Rank	Time	Rank	Time	Rank	Time	Rank	Time	Rank
Benjamin Maier*; Markus Sammer	Two-man	49.41	9	49.47	6	49.32	=5	49.56	10	3:17.76	8
Markus Treichl*; Kilian Walch	Two-man	49.67	13	49.67	15	49.56	14	49.66	13	3:18.56	15
Benjamin Maier*; Dănuț Moldovan; Markus Sammer; Kilian Walch	Four-man	49.10	14	49.21	5	49.03	7	49.56	4	3:16.90	7
Markus Treichl*; Ekemini Bassey; Markus Glueck; Marco Rangl	Four-man	49.73	24	49.83	22	49.68	20	Eliminated		2:29.24	22

Women

Athlete	Event	Run 1		Run 2		Run 3		Run 4		Total	
Athlete	Event	Time	Rank	Time	Rank	Time	Rank	Time	Rank	Time	Rank
Katrin Beierl*; Victoria Hahn	Two-woman	51.49	19	51.41	16	51.51	17	51.43	16	3:25.84	18
Christina Hengster*; Valerie Kleiser	Two-woman	51.23	14	51.04	9	51.00	8	51.24	11	3:24.51	10

* – Denotes the driver of each sled

== Cross-country skiing ==
Austria has qualified 4 men and 3 women.

Distance
Men

Athlete	Event	Classical		Freestyle		Total		
Athlete	Event	Time	Rank	Time	Rank	Time	Deficit	Rank
Dominik Baldauf	15 km freestyle	—N/a				36:31.2	+2:47.3	42
Max Hauke	15 km freestyle	—N/a				35:57.5	+2:13.6	29
Max Hauke	30 km skiathlon	41:15.7	29	36:57.5	32	1:18:44.6	+2:24.6	27
Max Hauke	50 km classical	—N/a				2:20:39.9	+12:17.8	36
Bernhard Tritscher	15 km freestyle	—N/a				36:24.7	+2:40.8	39
Bernhard Tritscher	50 km classical	—N/a				2:22:47.7	+14:25.6	42
Dominik Baldauf; Max Hauke; Luis Stadlober; Bernhard Tritscher	4 × 10 km relay	—N/a				1:39:12.9	+6:08.0	13

Women

Athlete	Event	Classical		Freestyle		Total		
Athlete	Event	Time	Rank	Time	Rank	Time	Deficit	Rank
Anna Seebacher	10 km freestyle	—N/a				29:11.2	+4:10.7	61
Teresa Stadlober	10 km freestyle	—N/a				26:16.1	+1:15.6	9
Teresa Stadlober	15 km skiathlon	21:25.8	6	19:15.3	7	41:11.5	+26.6	7
Teresa Stadlober	30 km classical	—N/a				1:26:31.7	+4:14.1	9
Lisa Unterweger	10 km freestyle	—N/a				29:35.2	+4:34.7	67

Sprint

Athlete	Event	Qualification		Quarterfinal		Semifinal		Final	
Athlete	Event	Time	Rank	Time	Rank	Time	Rank	Time	Rank
Dominik Baldauf	Men's sprint	3:18.54	35	Did not advance					
Luis Stadlober	Men's sprint	3:23.01	53	Did not advance					
Dominik Baldauf; Bernhard Tritscher	Men's team sprint	—N/a				16:43.69	8	Did not advance	
Lisa Unterweger	Women's sprint	3:34.29	50	Did not advance					
Teresa Stadlober; Lisa Unterweger	Women's team sprint	—N/a				17:25.98	7	Did not advance	

== Figure skating ==
Austria qualified one entry in pairs figure skating through the 2017 CS Nebelhorn Trophy. The pair was announced on 18 December 2017.

Athlete	Event	SP		FS		Total	
Athlete	Event	Points	Rank	Points	Rank	Points	Rank
Miriam Ziegler / Severin Kiefer	Pairs	58.80	20	Did not advance			

== Freestyle skiing ==
Austria has qualified 7 men and 5 women.

Halfpipe

Athlete	Event	Qualification				Final				
Athlete	Event	Run 1	Run 2	Best	Rank	Run 1	Run 2	Run 3	Best	Rank
Andreas Gohl	Men's halfpipe	68.60	31.60	68.60	12 Q	14.60	46.00	68.80	68.80	8
Marco Ladner	Men's halfpipe	54.20	39.40	54.20	21	Did not advance				
Lukas Müllauer	Men's halfpipe	17.00	63.60	63.60	16	Did not advance				
Elisabeth Gram	Women's halfpipe	72.20	20.00	72.20	13	Did not advance				

Moguls

Athlete	Event	Qualification								Final											
Athlete	Event	Run 1				Run 2				Run 1				Run 2				Run 3			
Athlete	Event	Time	Points	Total	Rank	Time	Points	Total	Rank	Time	Points	Total	Rank	Time	Points	Total	Rank	Time	Points	Total	Rank
Melanie Meilinger	Women's moguls	33.78	45.02	54.95	25	34.61	48.71	57.71	16	Did not advance											

Ski cross

Athlete	Event	Seeding		Round of 16	Quarterfinal	Semifinal	Final	
Athlete	Event	Time	Rank	Position	Position	Position	Position	Rank
Adam Kappacher	Men's ski cross	1:10.17	16	2 Q	DNF	Did not advance		
Christoph Wahrstötter	Men's ski cross	1:09.79	6	DNF	Did not advance			
Robert Winkler	Men's ski cross	1:10.09	11	1 Q	DNF	Did not advance		
Thomas Zangerl	Men's ski cross	1:10.96	28	2 Q	3	Did not advance		
Andrea Limbacher	Women's ski cross	1:14.71	8	DNF	Did not advance			
Katrin Ofner	Women's ski cross	1:14.30	7	1 Q	3	Did not advance		

Slopestyle

Athlete	Event	Qualification				Final				
Athlete	Event	Run 1	Run 2	Best	Rank	Run 1	Run 2	Run 3	Best	Rank
Lara Wolf	Women's slopestyle	10.20	66.40	66.40	16	Did not advance				

== Luge ==
Based on the results from the World Cups during the 2017–18 Luge World Cup season, Austria qualified 8 sleds.

Gleirscher's unexpected win in the men's individual luge event was the first win in the event for an Austrian since the 1968 Olympics.

Men

Athlete	Event	Run 1		Run 2		Run 3		Run 4		Total	
Athlete	Event	Time	Rank	Time	Rank	Time	Rank	Time	Rank	Time	Rank
Reinhard Egger	Singles	48.221	20	47.903	11	47.963	17	47.840	10	3:11.927	15
David Gleirscher	Singles	47.652	1	47.835	7	47.584	4	47.631	4	3:10.702	1st place, gold medalist(s)
Wolfgang Kindl	Singles	47.955	11	47.858	9	47.799	12	47.521	2	3:11.133	9
Georg Fischler; Peter Penz	Doubles	45.891	2	45.894	2	—N/a				1:31.785	2nd place, silver medalist(s)
Lorenz Koller; Thomas Steu	Doubles	46.172	5	46.112	5	—N/a				1:32.284	4

Women

Athlete	Event	Run 1		Run 2		Run 3		Run 4		Total	
Athlete	Event	Time	Rank	Time	Rank	Time	Rank	Time	Rank	Time	Rank
Madeleine Egle	Singles	46.726	14	46.646	14	46.541	6	46.696	7	3:06.609	9
Birgit Platzer	Singles	47.318	18	DNF		DNS		Eliminated		DNF	
Hannah Prock	Singles	46.622	13	46.585	13	47.743	25	46.854	12	3:07.804	17

Mixed team relay

Athlete	Event	Run 1		Run 2		Run 3		Total	
Athlete	Event	Time	Rank	Time	Rank	Time	Rank	Time	Rank
Madeleine Egle; David Gleirscher; Georg Fischler; Peter Penz	Team relay	47.122	5	48.758	3	49.108	4	2:24.988	3rd place, bronze medalist(s)

== Nordic combined ==
Austria has qualified 5 men:

Athlete	Event	Ski jumping			Cross-country		Total	
Athlete	Event	Distance	Points	Rank	Time	Rank	Time	Rank
Wilhelm Denifl	Normal hill/10 km	92.0	92.3	25	25:08.8	27	27:41.8	29
Wilhelm Denifl	Large hill/10 km	137.5	135.0	3	24:38.6	34	24:54.6	8
Bernhard Gruber	Normal hill/10 km	91.5	88.2	33	24:32.1	10	27:22.1	20
Bernhard Gruber	Large hill/10 km	133.5	98.5	30	23:46.3	14	26:28.3	21
Lukas Klapfer	Normal hill/10 km	109.0	122.6	4	24:37.5	11	25:09.5	3rd place, bronze medalist(s)
Lukas Klapfer	Large hill/10 km	131.0	123.0	10	24:11.3	23	25:15.3	9
Franz-Josef Rehrl	Normal hill/10 km	112.0	130.6	1	26:29.5	44	26:29.5	13
Mario Seidl	Large hill/10 km	127.0	116.5	14	23:51.0	16	25:21.0	13
Wilhelm Denifl; Bernhard Gruber; Lukas Klapfer; Mario Seidl	Team large hill/4 x 5 km	536.5	469.5	1	47:17.6	5	47:17.6	3rd place, bronze medalist(s)

== Skeleton ==
Based on the world rankings, Austria qualified 3 sleds, but rejected one male quota.

Athlete	Event	Run 1		Run 2		Run 3		Run 4		Total	
Athlete	Event	Time	Rank	Time	Rank	Time	Rank	Time	Rank	Time	Rank
Matthias Guggenberger	Men's	51.38	16	51.29	17	51.81	25	51.25	13	3:25.73	18
Janine Flock	Women's	51.81	3	52.07	3	51.92	4	52.12	10	3:27.92	4

== Ski jumping ==
Austria has qualified 5 men and 3 women:

Men

Athlete	Event	Qualification			First round			Final			Total	
Athlete	Event	Distance	Points	Rank	Distance	Points	Rank	Distance	Points	Rank	Points	Rank
Clemens Aigner	Large hill	119.5	98.5	27 Q	121.0	110.0	31	Did not advance				
Manuel Fettner	Normal hill	95.0	109.4	27 Q	96.5	99.5	29 Q	105.5	112.2	14	211.7	23
Manuel Fettner	Large hill	111.0	84.8	40 Q	124.0	109.8	32	Did not advance				
Michael Hayböck	Normal hill	97.0	112.4	26 Q	99.5	109.2	21 Q	103.0	110.5	17	219.7	17
Michael Hayböck	Large hill	133.5	126.9	5 Q	140.0	140.4	2 Q	131.0	127.3	9	267.7	6
Stefan Kraft	Normal hill	102.5	128.6	5 Q	103.5	122.8	5 Q	103.0	110.8	16	233.6	11
Stefan Kraft	Large hill	131.0	121.1	11 Q	131.5	130.6	13 Q	125.5	116.8	21	247.4	18
Gregor Schlierenzauer	Normal hill	91.5	104.0	32 Q	102.5	108.6	22 Q	99.5	103.6	22	212.2	22
Manuel Fettner; Michael Hayböck; Stefan Kraft; Gregor Schlierenzauer	Team large hill	—N/a			517.0	493.7	4 Q	511.0	484.7	4	978.4	4

Women

Athlete	Event	First round			Final			Total	
Athlete	Event	Distance	Points	Rank	Distance	Points	Rank	Points	Rank
Chiara Hölzl	Normal hill	88.0	92.2	14	95.5	101.0	9	193.2	11
Daniela Iraschko-Stolz	Normal hill	101.5	113.3	5	99.0	112.6	7	225.9	6
Jacqueline Seifriedsberger	Normal hill	93.0	93.7	13	92.0	89.8	14	183.5	13

== Snowboarding ==
Austria has qualified 9 men and 5 women:

Freestyle

Athlete	Event	Qualification				Final				
Athlete	Event	Run 1	Run 2	Best	Rank	Run 1	Run 2	Run 3	Best	Rank
Clemens Millauer	Men's big air	39.25	47.00	47.00	16	Did not advance				
Clemens Millauer	Men's slopestyle	75.65	77.45	77.45	7	Did not advance				
Anna Gasser	Women's big air	88.25	98.00	98.00	1 Q	JNS	89.00	96.00	185.00	1st place, gold medalist(s)
Anna Gasser	Women's slopestyle	Canceled				42.05	46.56	CAN	46.56	15

Qualification Legend: QF – Qualify directly to final; QS – Qualify to semifinal

Parallel

Athlete	Event	Qualification		Round of 16	Quarterfinal	Semifinal	Final	
Athlete	Event	Time	Rank	Opposition Time	Opposition Time	Opposition Time	Opposition Time	Rank
Benjamin Karl	Men's giant slalom	1:25.33	6 Q	Prommegger (AUT); W –0.29	Lee S–h (KOR); L +0.94	Did not advance		
Sebastian Kislinger	Men's giant slalom	1:25.59	10 Q	Baumeister (GER); L +0.22	Did not advance			
Alexander Payer	Men's giant slalom	1:25.30	5 Q	Coratti (ITA); L +0.33	Did not advance			
Andreas Prommegger	Men's giant slalom	1:25.67	11 Q	Karl (AUT); L +0.29	Did not advance			
Julia Dujmovits	Women's giant slalom	1:33.16	11 Q	Takeuchi (JPN); L +0.17	Did not advance			
Ina Meschik	Women's giant slalom	1:33.23	13 Q	Langenhorst (GER); W –0.02	Hofmeister (GER); L +0.78	Did not advance		
Claudia Riegler	Women's giant slalom	DNF		Did not advance				
Daniela Ulbing	Women's giant slalom	1:33.07	8 Q	Bykova (OAR); W –0.52	Ledecká (CZE); L +0.97	Did not advance		

Snowboard cross

Athlete	Event	Seeding						1/8 final	Quarterfinal	Semifinal	Final	
Athlete	Event	Run 1		Run 2		Best	Seed	1/8 final	Quarterfinal	Semifinal	Final	
Athlete	Event	Time	Rank	Time	Rank	Best	Seed	Position	Position	Position	Position	Rank
Hanno Douschan	Men's snowboard cross	1:14.53	16	Bye		1:14.53	16	4	Did not advance			
Alessandro Hämmerle	Men's snowboard cross	1:15.03	24	Bye		1:15.03	24	1 Q	3 Q	5 FB	7	7
Lukas Pachner	Men's snowboard cross	1:16.99	33	1:17.48	11	1:16.99	38	5	Did not advance			
Markus Schairer	Men's snowboard cross	1:14.56	17	Bye		1:14.56	17	3 Q	DNF	Did not advance		

Qualification legend: FA-Qualify to medal round; FB- Qualify to consolation round

== Speed skating ==
Austria earned the following quotas at the conclusion of the four World Cup's used for qualification.

Individual

Athlete	Event	Race	
Athlete	Event	Time	Rank
Vanessa Herzog	Women's 500 m	37.51	4
Vanessa Herzog	Women's 1500 m	1:14.47	5

Mass start

Athlete	Event	Semifinal			Final		
Athlete	Event	Points	Time	Rank	Points	Time	Rank
Linus Heidegger	Men's mass start	60	8:20.46	1 Q	6	7:52.38	6
