= Luge at the 2018 Winter Olympics – Doubles =

Doubles at the XXIII Olympic Winter Games
- Venue: Alpensia Sliding Centre near Pyeongchang, South Korea
- Dates: 14 February 2018
- Competitors: 40 from 13 nations
- Winning time: 1:31.697

Medalists
1st place, gold medalist(s)		Tobias Wendl; Tobias Arlt	Germany
2nd place, silver medalist(s)		Peter Penz; Georg Fischler	Austria
3rd place, bronze medalist(s)		Toni Eggert; Sascha Benecken	Germany

The doubles luge at the 2018 Winter Olympics was held on 14 February 2018 at the Alpensia Sliding Centre near Pyeongchang, South Korea. Tobias Wendl and Tobias Arlt, the defending champions, repeated their 2014 success and won gold medals. Peter Penz and Georg Fischler became second, and Toni Eggert third Sascha Benecken. Wendl and Arlt were also first in both runs, Penz and Fischler second in both runs, and Eggert and Benecken third in both runs. For Penz, Fischler, Eggert, and Benecken these were their first Olympic medals. The 2014 bronze medalists, Andris Šics and Juris Šics, were ninth in the first run and fourth in the second run, which was only sufficient for the fifth place overall.

== Qualifying athletes ==
- Georg Fischler & Peter Penz (AUT)
- Lorenz Koller & Thomas Steu (AUT)
- Justin Snith & Tristan Walker (CAN)
- Antonín Brož & Lukáš Brož (CZE)
- Jaromír Kudera & Matěj Kvíčala (CZE)
- Sascha Benecken & Toni Eggert (GER)
- Tobias Arlt & Tobias Wendl (GER)
- Fabian Malleier & Ivan Nagler (ITA)
- Ludwig Rieder & Patrick Rastner (ITA)
- Cho Jung-myung & Park Jin-yong (KOR)
- Andris Šics & Juris Šics (LAT)
- Oskars Gudramovičs & Pēteris Kalniņš (LAT)
- Alexander Denisyev & Vladislav Antonov (OAR)
- Andrei Bogdanov & Andrei Medvedev (OAR)
- Jakub Kowalewski & Wojciech Chmielewski (POL)
- Cosmin Atodiresei & Ștefan Musei (ROU)
- Karol Stuchlák & Marek Solčanský (SVK)
- Oleksandr Obolonchyk & Roman Zakharkiv (UKR)
- Jayson Terdiman & Matthew Mortensen (USA)
- Andrew Sherk & Justin Krewson (USA)

== Competition schedule ==
All times are (UTC+9).

Date	Time	Event
14 February	20:20	Run 1
14 February	21:30	Run 2

== Results ==
Two runs were used to determine the winner.

Rank	Bib	Athlete	Country	Run 1	Rank	Run 2	Rank	Total	Behind
1st place, gold medalist(s)	3	Tobias Wendl; Tobias Arlt	Germany	45.820	1	45.877	1	1:31.697	–
2nd place, silver medalist(s)	5	Peter Penz; Georg Fischler	Austria	45.891	2	45.894	2	1:31.785	+0.088
3rd place, bronze medalist(s)	4	Toni Eggert; Sascha Benecken	Germany	45.931	3	46.056	3	1:31.987	+0.290
4	12	Thomas Steu; Lorenz Koller	Austria	46.172	5	46.112	5	1:32.284	+0.587
5	9	Tristan Walker; Justin Snith	Canada	46.134	4	46.235	6	1:32.369	+0.672
6	2	Andris Šics; Juris Šics	Latvia	46.336	9	46.106	4	1:32.442	+0.745
7	11	Ivan Nagler; Fabian Malleier	Italy	46.320	8	46.243	7	1:32.563	+0.866
8	16	Justin Krewson; Andrew Sherk	United States	46.310	7	46.342	10	1:32.652	+0.955
9	18	Park Jin-yong; Cho Jung-myung	South Korea	46.396	10	46.276	8	1:32.672	+0.975
10	8	Matthew Mortensen; Jayson Terdiman	United States	46.244	6	46.443	13	1:32.687	+0.990
11	1	Alexander Denisyev; Vladislav Antonov	Olympic Athletes from Russia	46.437	11	46.344	11	1:32.781	+1.084
12	7	Wojciech Chmielewski; Jakub Kowalewski	Poland	46.609	13	46.478	14	1:33.087	+1.390
13	14	Lukáš Brož; Antonín Brož	Czech Republic	46.570	12	46.582	16	1:33.152	+1.455
14	6	Oskars Gudramovičs; Pēteris Kalniņš	Latvia	46.890	17	46.317	9	1:33.207	+1.510
15	10	Ludwig Rieder; Patrick Rastner	Italy	46.709	14	46.567	15	1:33.276	+1.579
16	15	Andrei Bogdanov; Andrei Medvedev	Olympic Athletes from Russia	47.106	19	46.402	12	1:33.508	+1.811
17	19	Marek Solčanský; Karol Stuchlák	Slovakia	46.780	15	46.811	17	1:33.591	+1.894
18	20	Matěj Kvíčala; Jaromír Kudera	Czech Republic	46.818	16	46.910	18	1:33.728	+2.031
19	13	Cosmin Atodiresei; Ștefan Musei	Romania	47.101	18	47.171	19	1:34.272	+2.575
20	17	Oleksandr Obolonchyk; Roman Zakharkiv	Ukraine	48.316	20	47.401	20	1:35.717	+4.020
