= Roman Zakharkiv =

Ukrainian luger (born 1991)

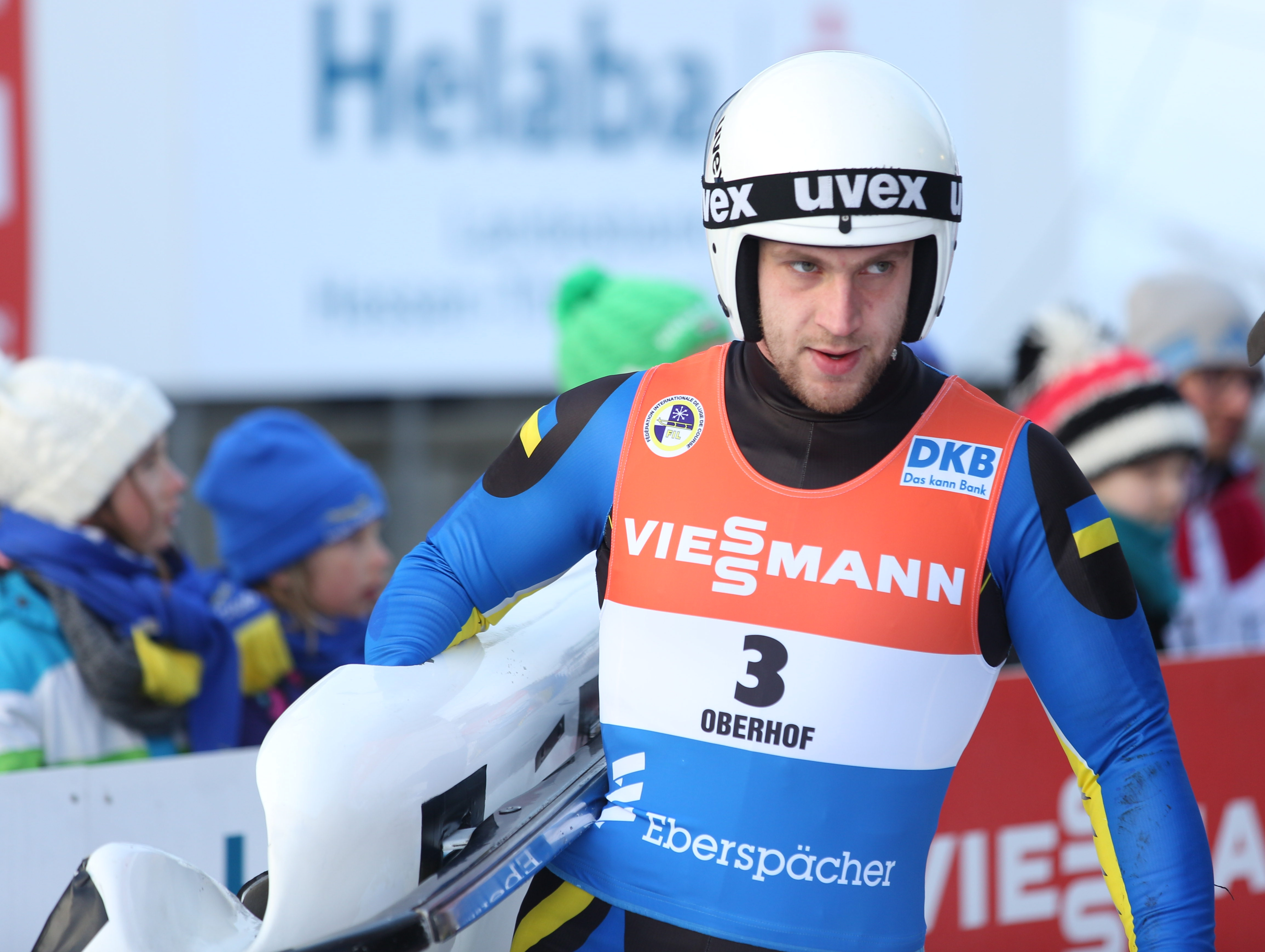
- Zakharkiv in 2017

Personal information
- Native name: Роман Ярославович Захарків
- Full name: Roman Yaroslavovych Zakharkiv
- Nationality: Ukrainian
- Born: 24 January 1991 (age 35) Lviv, Ukrainian SSR, Soviet Union

Sport
- Country: Ukraine
- Sport: Luge
- Event: Doubles

Roman Yaroslavovych Zakharkiv (Ukrainian: Роман Ярославович Захарків; born 24 January 1991) is a Ukrainian luger who has competed since 2005. He participated at 2010, 2014 and 2018 Winter Olympics.

== Career ==
Zakharkiv has competed at international level since 2007 with Taras Senkiv. He qualified for the 2010 Winter Olympics where he finished 19th in doubles event. After 2010–11 season he missed two years. During his absence he changed his partner. Since then he competes with Oleksandr Obolonchyk.

Zakharkiv competed at the 2014 Winter Olympics for Ukraine. In the doubles he was 17th. He was also a part of the Ukrainian relay team, which finished 11th.

After 2014 Olympics he became one of Ukrainian national team leaders and since then he participates in all major competitions. He participated in doubles and relay competitions at three World Championships without any great success.

As of January 2018, his best finish is 13th place in Sigulda, Latvia, in 2016-17 season.

On 27 December 2017 Roman Zakharkiv qualified for 2018 Winter Olympics. At that Games he competed together with Oleksandr Obolonchyk and finished 20th in doubles competition and 13th in team relay.

== Personal life ==
Zakharkiv graduated from Lviv State University of Physical Culture.

== Career results ==
=== Winter Olympics ===
Year	Event	Doubles	Relay
2010	Vancouver, Canada	19	
2014	Sochi, Russia	17	11
2018	Pyeongchang, South Korea	20	13

=== World Championships ===
Year	Event	Doubles	Relay	Doubles Sprint
2015	Sigulda, Latvia	19	10	
2016	Königssee, Germany	DNF	13	21
2017	Innsbruck, Austria	16	13	25

=== European Championships ===
Year	Event	Doubles	Relay
2014	Sigulda, Latvia		7
2015	Sochi, Russia	14	5
2016	Altenberg, Germany	18	
2017	Königssee, Germany	17	8
2018	Sigulda, Latvia	18	7

=== Luge World Cup ===
==== Rankings ====
Season	Doubles	Doubles Sprint
2007–08	29	
2008–09	26	
2009–10	26	
2010–11	27	
2013–14	24	
2014–15	21	
2015–16	23	
2016–17	20	19
2017–18	23	
