= Krewson =

Krewson is a surname. Notable people with the surname include:

- Jim Krewson, singer and guitarist of Jim & Jennie and the Pinetops
- Justin Krewson (born 1996), American luger
- Lyda Krewson (born 1953), American politician
- Rollie Krewson, American puppet designer active since the mid-1970s
