= Luge at the 2018 Winter Olympics =

Luge at the XXIII Olympic Winter Games
- Luge pictogram at the 2018 Winter Olympics
- Venue: Alpensia Sliding Centre
- Dates: 10–15 February 2018
- No. of events: 4 (2 men, 1 women, 1 mixed)
- Competitors: 110 from 24 nations

Luge at the 2018 Winter Olympics was held at the Alpensia Sliding Centre near Pyeongchang, South Korea. A total of four luge events were held, between 10 and 15 February 2018.

== Qualification ==
A maximum of 110 athletes were allowed to compete at the Games. Countries were assigned quotas using the world rankings of results from 1 November 2017 to 31 December 2017.

== Competition schedule ==
The following was the competition schedule for all four events.

All times are (UTC+9).

Date	Time	Event
10 February	19:10	Men's singles runs 1 and 2
11 February	18:50	Men's singles runs 3 and 4
12 February	19:50	Women's singles runs 1 and 2
13 February	19:30	Women's singles runs 3 and 4
14 February	20:20	Doubles runs 1 and 2
15 February	21:30	Team relay

== Medal summary ==
=== Medal table ===
Rank	Nation	Gold	Silver	Bronze	Total
1	Germany	3	1	2	6
2	Austria	1	1	1	3
3	Canada	0	1	1	2
4	United States	0	1	0	1
Totals (4 entries)		4	4	4	12

=== Events ===
Event	Gold		Silver		Bronze	
Men's singles	David Gleirscher; Austria	3:10.702	Chris Mazdzer; United States	3:10.728	Johannes Ludwig; Germany	3:10.932
Women's singles	Natalie Geisenberger; Germany	3:05.232	Dajana Eitberger; Germany	3:05.599	Alex Gough; Canada	3:05.644
Doubles	Germany; Tobias Wendl; Tobias Arlt	1:31.697	Austria; Peter Penz; Georg Fischler	1:31.785	Germany; Toni Eggert; Sascha Benecken	1:31.987
Team relay	Germany; Natalie Geisenberger; Johannes Ludwig; Tobias Wendl; Tobias Arlt	2:24.517	Canada; Alex Gough; Samuel Edney; Tristan Walker; Justin Snith	2:24.872	Austria; Madeleine Egle; David Gleirscher; Peter Penz; Georg Fischler	2:24.988

== Participating nations ==
A total of 110 athletes from 24 nations (including the IOC's designation of Olympic Athletes from Russia) were scheduled to participate.

- Argentina (1 athlete)
- Australia (1)
- Austria (10)
- Bulgaria (1)
- Canada (8)
- Croatia (1)
- Czech Republic (6)
- Georgia (1)
- Germany (10)
- Great Britain (2)
- India (1)
- Italy (9)
- Kazakhstan (1)
- Latvia (10)
- Olympic Athletes from Russia (8)
- Poland (6)
- Romania (5)
- Slovakia (5)
- Slovenia (1)
- South Korea (5)
- Switzerland (1)
- Chinese Taipei (1)
- Ukraine (6)
- United States (10)
