= Chris Eißler =

German luger (born 1993)

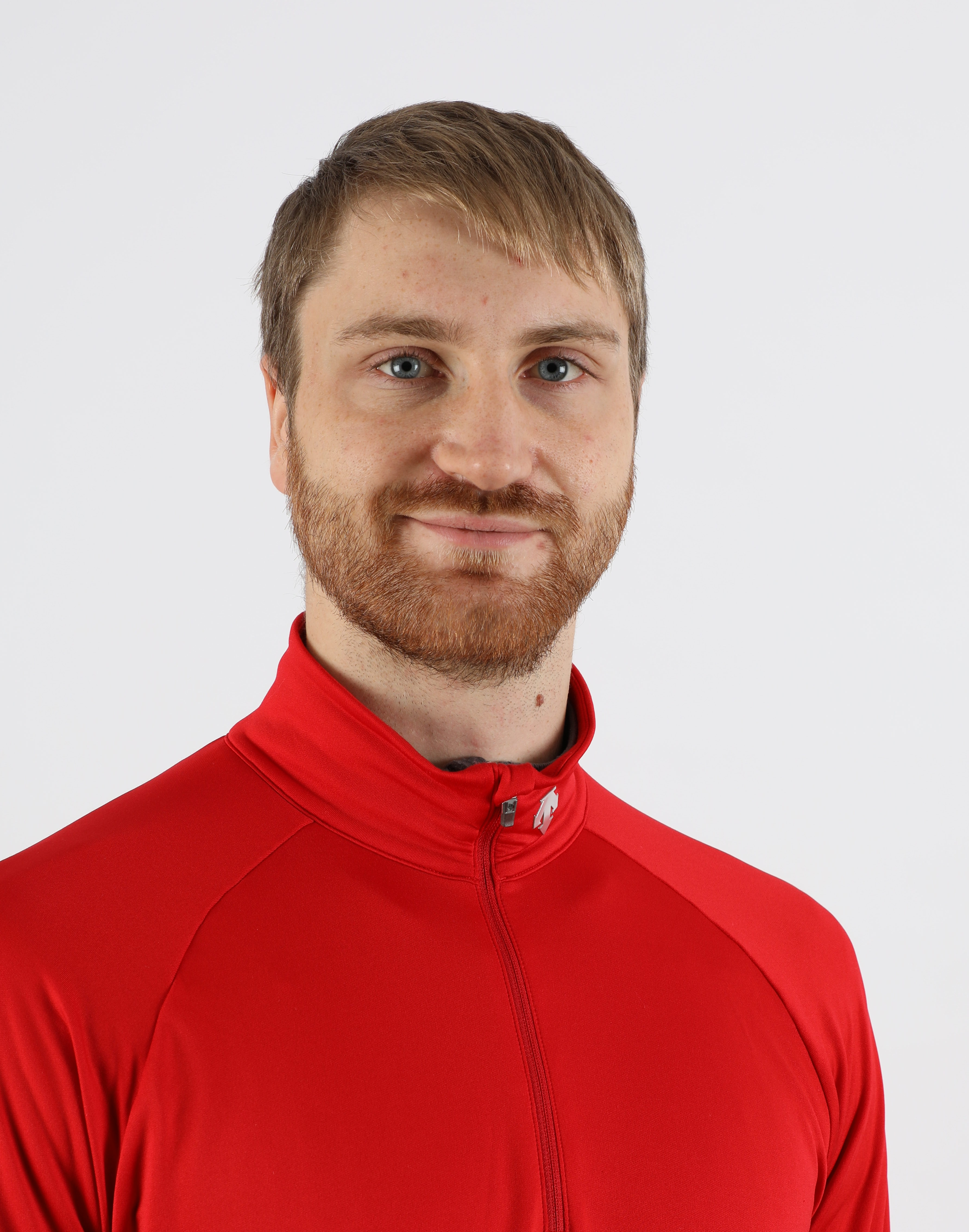
Chris Eißler (Germany).

Chris Eißler (born 19 January 1993) is a German luge athlete who has represented Germany in the men's single event Luge World Cup. During the 2013–14 Luge World Cup season he was victorious in the men's single event held in Winterberg with a time of 52.938.
