= Julian von Schleinitz =

German luger (born 1991)

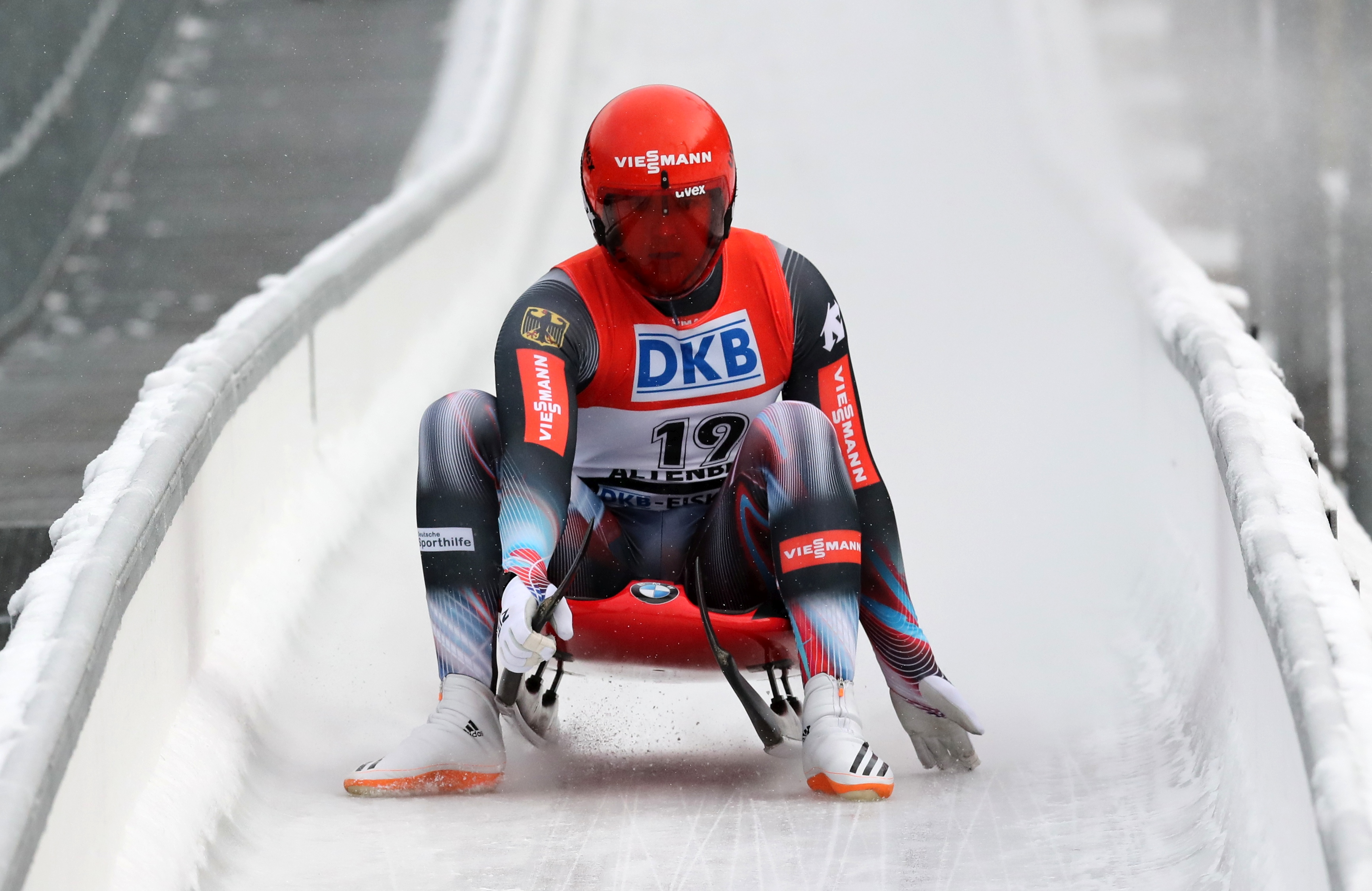
Julian von Schleinitz

Julian von Schleinitz (born September 19, 1991 in Germany) is a German luge athlete who represents his nation in the men's singles luge event in international competition. In 2010 he won the junior world championship in the event. During the 2010-11 luge World Cup season he placed third in the event held in Winterberg and during the 2013-14 Luge World Cup season he again placed third in an event, this time in Oberhof.

He is a member of the old Saxon noble family von Schleinitz.
