= Matěj Kvíčala =

Czech luger (born 1989)

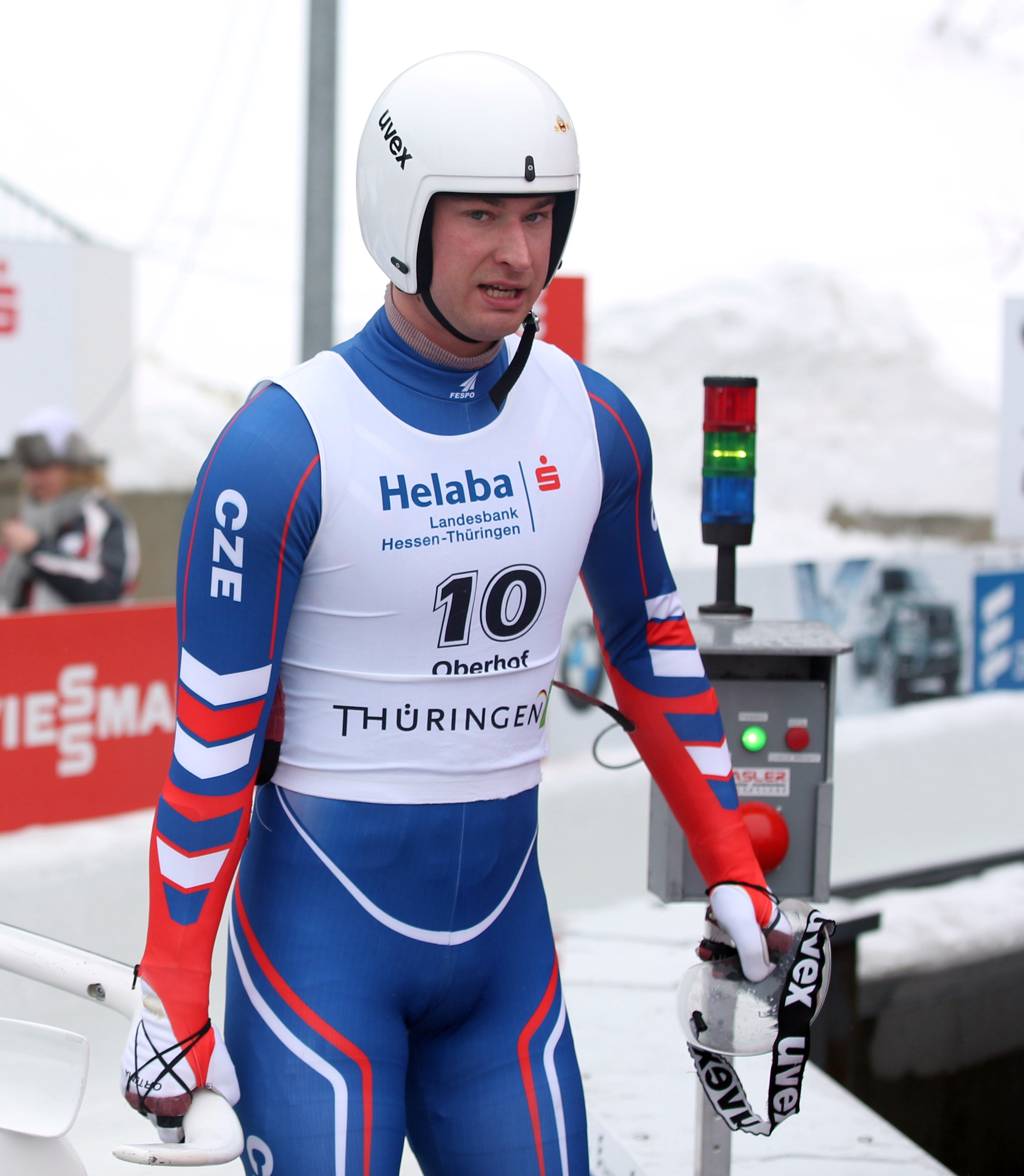
Kvíčala in Oberhof in 2017

Matěj Kvíčala (born 6 May 1989 in Jablonec nad Nisou) is a Czech luger, who has competed since 1999.

He finished 18th in doubles at the 2010 Olympic Games together with Luboš Jíra, and finished 15th in the men's doubles event at the FIL European Luge Championships 2010 in Sigulda.

Competing in doubles with Jaromir Kudera, he finished 23rd at the 2012 World Championships, 17th at the 2013 World Championships, 13th at the 2015 World Championships, 16th at the 2016 World Championships (as well as 11th in the team relay), before missing out on the second run of the 2017 World Championships. Kvíčala and Kudera then finished 18th at the 2018 Olympic Games.
