= Andrew Sherk =

American luger (born 1992)

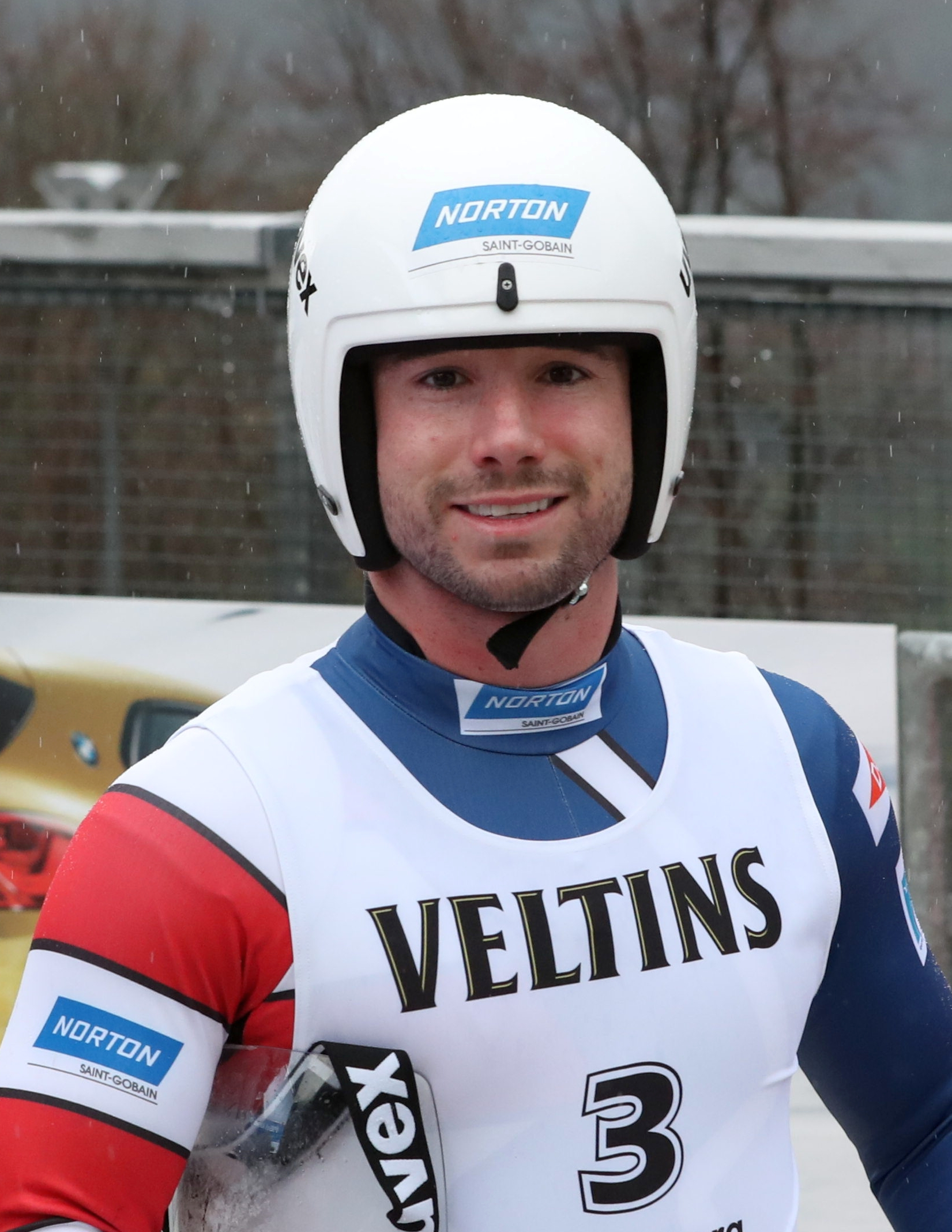
- Sherk in 2017

Personal information
- Born: 15 April 1992 (age 34) Fort Washington, Pennsylvania, U.S.

Sport
- Sport: Luge

Andrew Sherk (born April 15, 1992) is an American luger. He competed in the men's doubles event at the 2018 Winter Olympics.
