= Georg Fischler =

Austrian luger (born 1985)

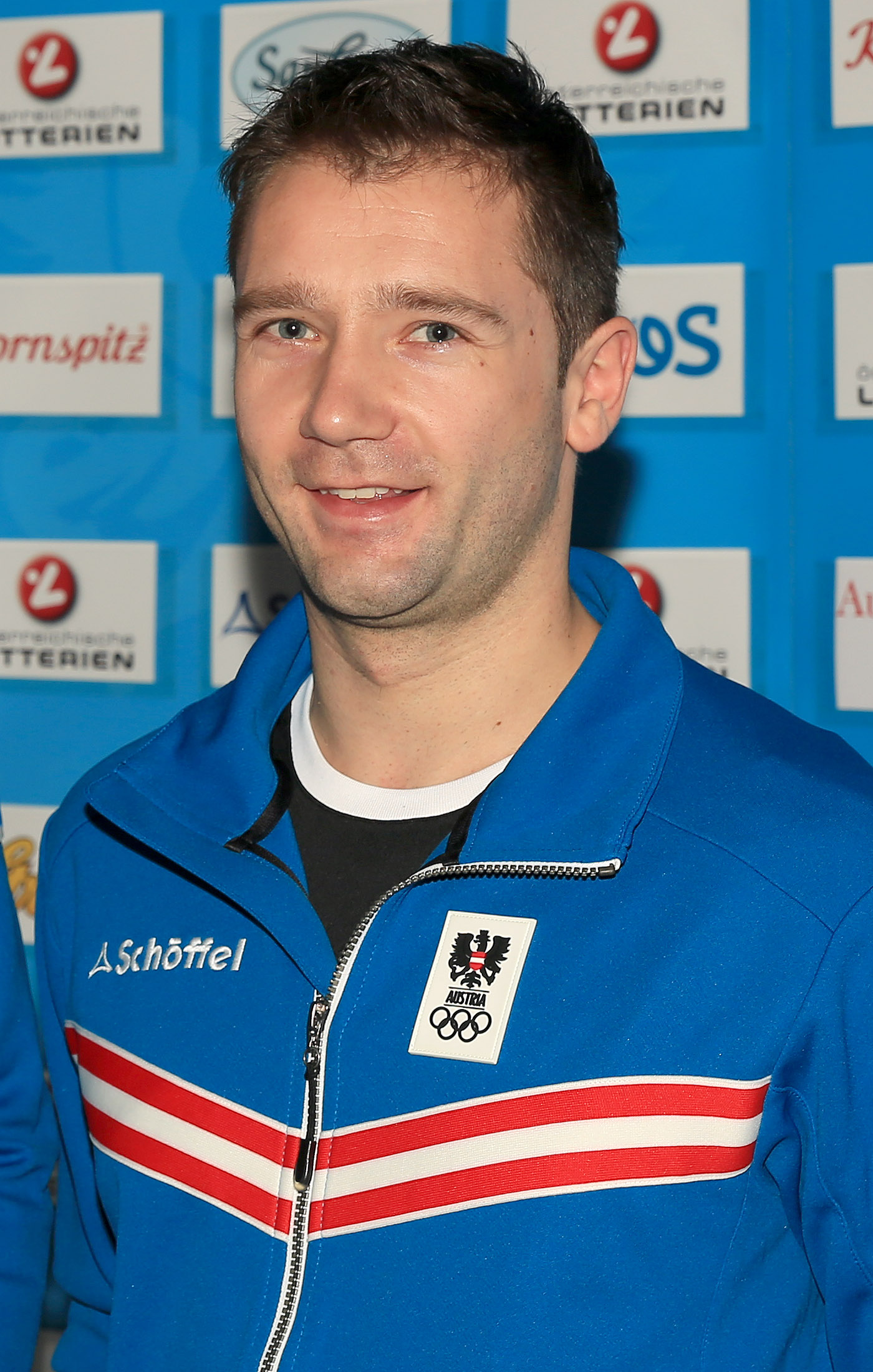
- Georg Fischler in 2014

Medal record

Men's luge

Representing Austria

Olympic Games
Silver medal – second place	2018 Pyeongchang	Doubles
Bronze medal – third place	2018 Pyeongchang	Team relay

World Championships
Silver medal – second place	2009 Lake Placid	Mixed team
Silver medal – second place	2015 Sigulda	Doubles
Silver medal – second place	2016 Königssee	Sprint
Silver medal – second place	2017 Igls	Sprint
Bronze medal – third place	2007 Igls	Mixed team
Bronze medal – third place	2012 Altenberg	Doubles

European Championships
Gold medal – first place	2012 Paramonovo	Doubles
Silver medal – second place	2015 Sochi	Doubles
Bronze medal – third place	2013 Oberhof	Doubles
Bronze medal – third place	2016 Altenberg	Doubles

Georg Fischler (born 3 July 1985 in Hall in Tirol) is an Austrian former luger who competed between 2003 and 2018. He and doubles partner Peter Penz took two medals at the 2018 Winter Olympics in Pyongchang: a silver in the doubles competition and a bronze in the team relay. They were also gold medallists in the doubles at the 2012 European Luge Championships in Paramonovo. In addition the pair took six medals at the FIL World Luge Championships: four in the doubles and two in mixed team competitions.

He won two medals in the mixed team event at the FIL World Luge Championships with a silver in 2009 and a bronze in 2007. He also finished fifth in the men's doubles event at the 2008 championships in Oberhof, Germany. Fischler also finished sixth in the men's doubles event at the 2008 FIL European Luge Championships in Cesana, Italy.

In August 2018 Penz and Fischler announced their retirement from competition. He confirmed that he would remain in the sport as a coach with the Austrian Luge Federation. The pair made their last competitive appearance at the 2018–19 Luge World Cup's opening round at Igls in November 2018.
