= Justin Krewson =

American luger (born 1996)

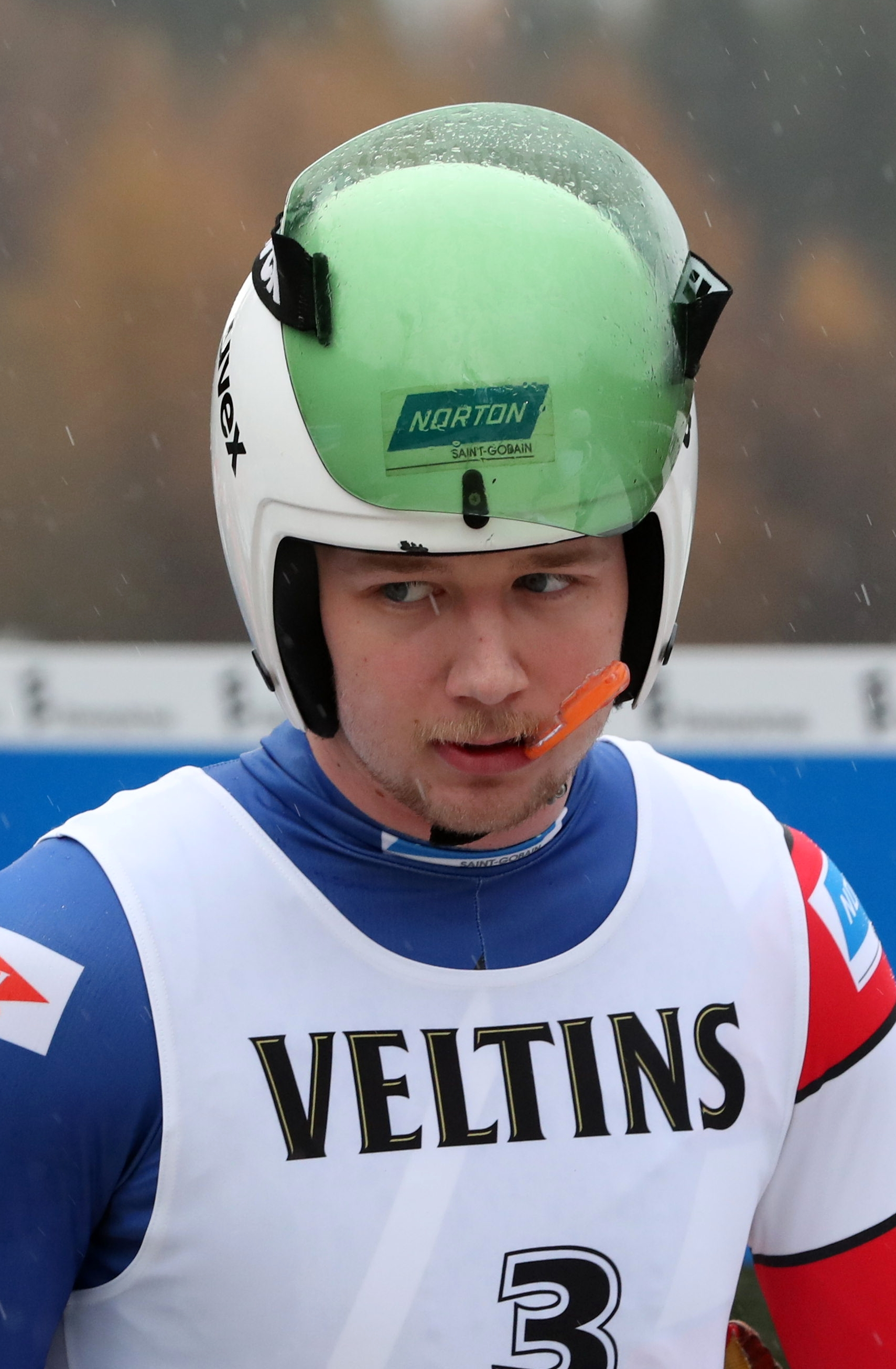
- Krewson in 2017

Personal information
- Nationality: American
- Born: July 24, 1996 (age 30)

Sport
- Sport: Luge

Justin Krewson (born July 24, 1996) is an American luger. He competed in the men's doubles event at the 2018 Winter Olympics.
