= Ludwig Rieder =

Italian luger (born 1991)

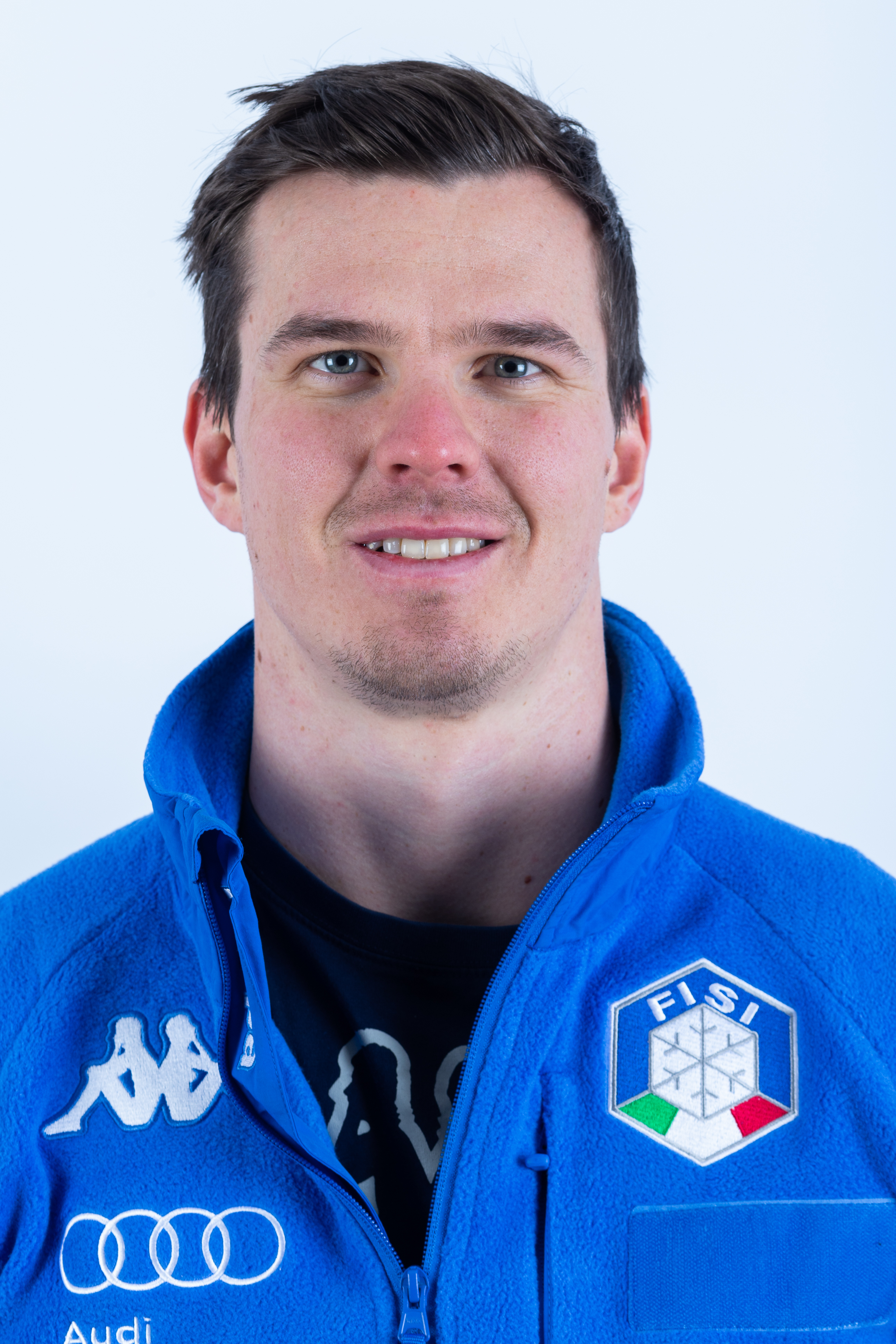
Rieder in 2018.

Ludwig Rieder (born 19 June 1991) is an Italian luger.

Rieder was born in Brixen, Italy, and competed in the Men's double luge event at the 2014 Winter Olympics in Sochi as a pair with Patrick Rastner. The duo finished in seventh place.

In the open double luge event at the 2018 Winter Olympics in PyeongChang, Rieder and Rastner placed 15th.
