= Marek Solčanský =

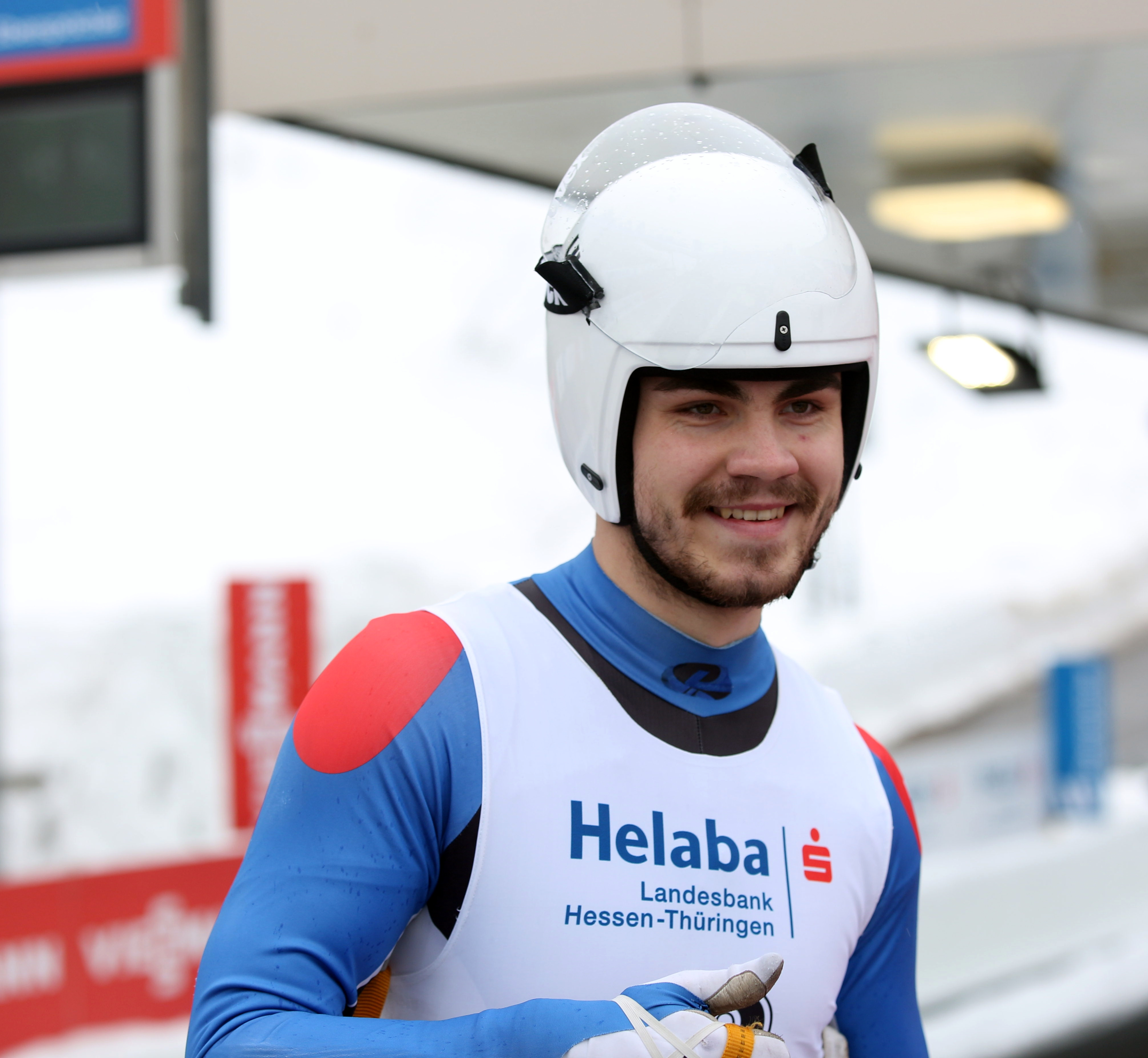

Personal information
- Nationality: Slovak
- Born: Poprad, Slovakia
- Height: 182 cm (6 ft 0 in)
- Weight: 78 kg (172 lb; 12 st 4 lb)

Marek Solčanský (born 18 November 1992) is a Slovak luger who competed at the 2014 and 2018 Winter Olympics, both times on a sled with Karol Stuchlák on a doubles sled.

Solčanský was born in Poprad, Slovakia.
