= Ștefan Musei =

Romanian luger (born 1995)

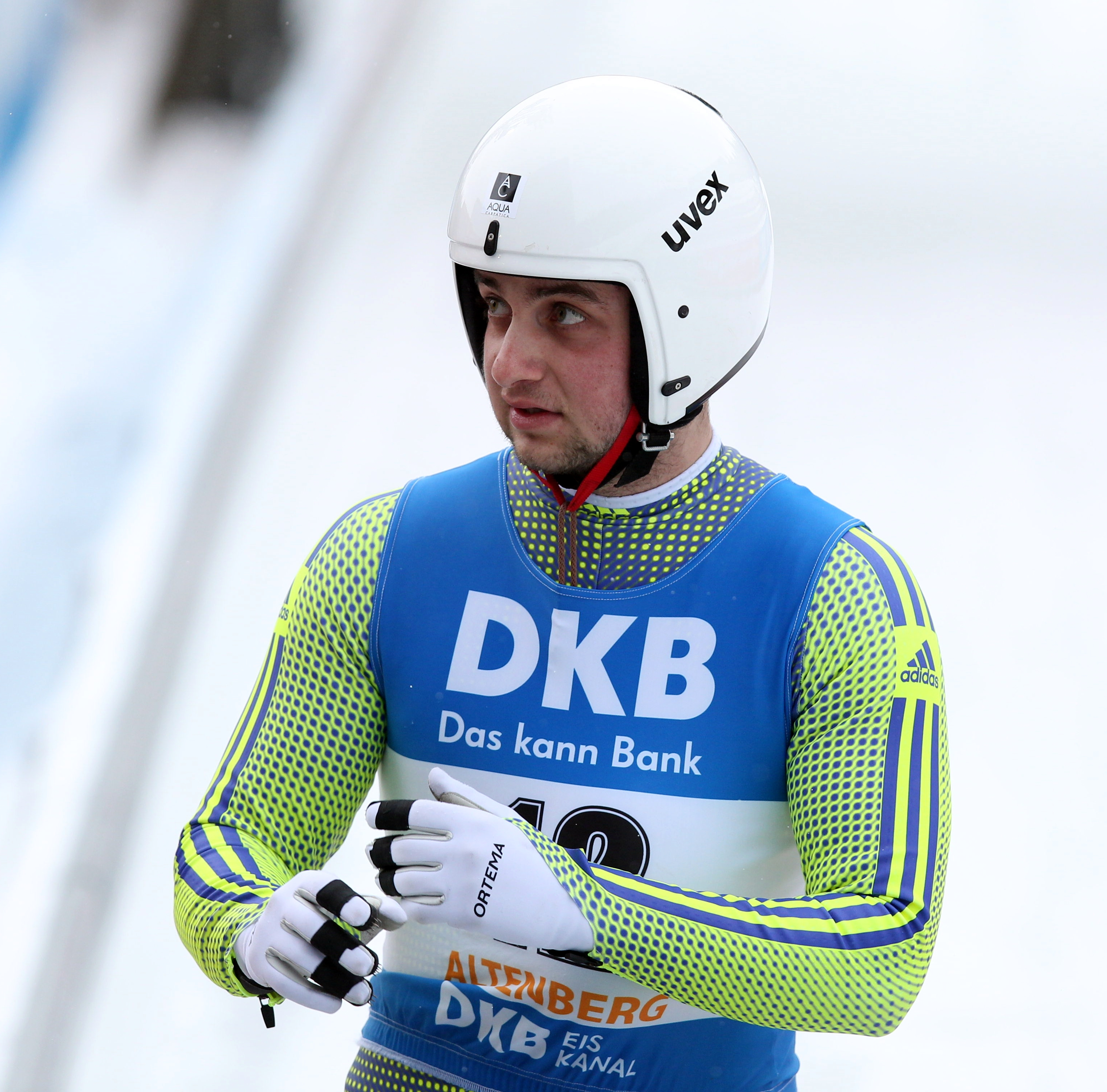
- Musei in 2017

Personal information
- Nationality: Romanian
- Born: 10 December 1995 (age 29)

Sport
- Sport: Luge

Ștefan Musei (born 10 December 1995) is a Romanian luger. He competed in the men's doubles event at the 2018 Winter Olympics.
