= Patrick Rastner =

Italian luger (born 1993)

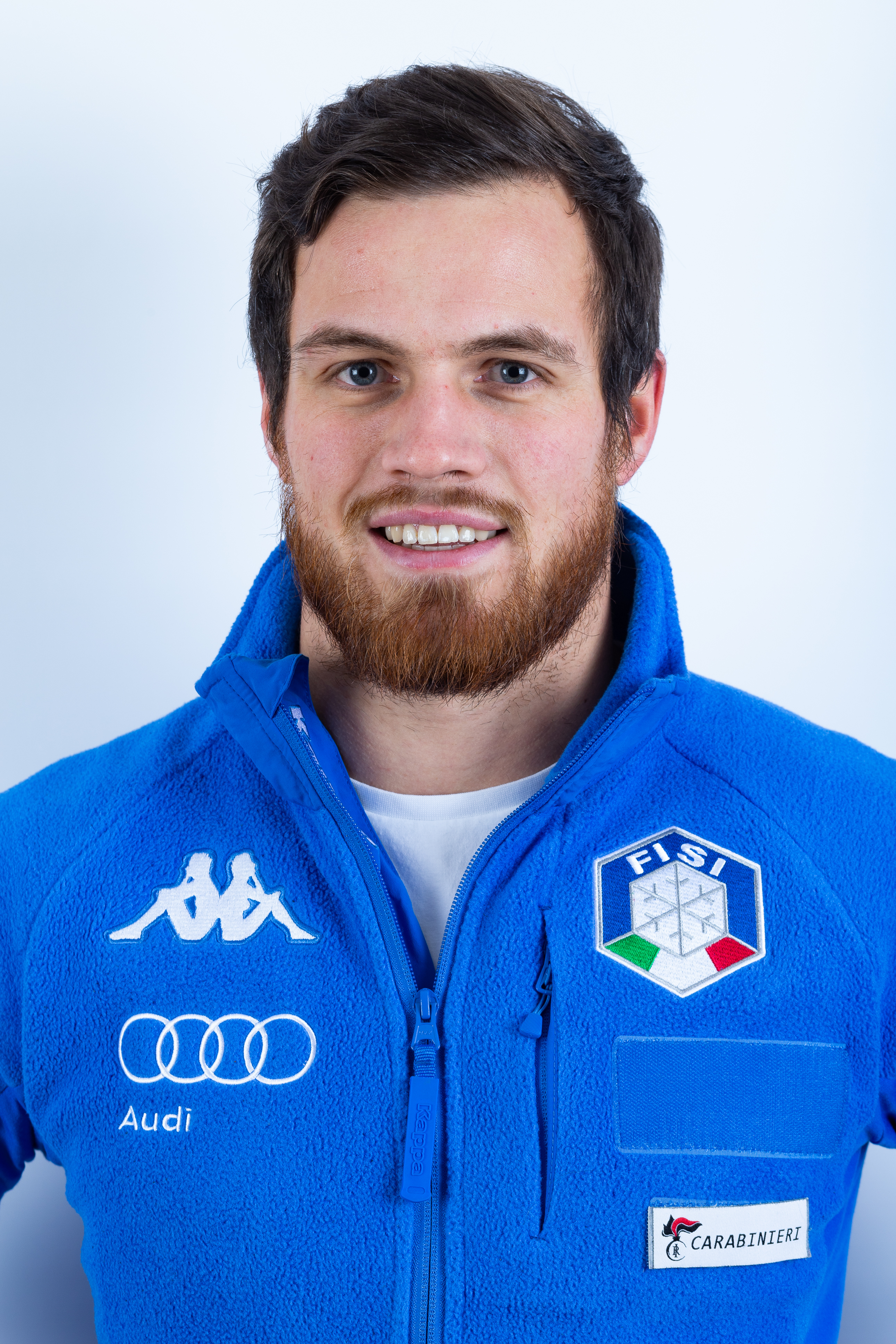
Rastner in 2018.

Patrick Rastner (born 30 June 1993) is an Italian luger who competed in the men's double event at the 2014 Winter Olympics in Sochi as a pair with Ludwig Rieder. The duo placed seventh.

== Personal life ==
Rastner was born on 30 June 1993 in Brixen (Bressanone), Bolzano-Bozen, Italy.

== Luge career ==
In 2011 he won a gold medal with Ludwig Rieder at the under-23 World Championships in Cesana, Italy.

Rastner represented Italy at the 2014 Winter Olympics, held in Sochi, Russia. Competing in the men's doubles luge event alongside Rieder, he finished seventh overall. The pair were eighth after the first run but improved their position after finishing fifth fastest in the second run.

In the open double luge event at the 2018 Winter Olympics in PyeongChang, Rastner and Rieder placed 15th.
