= Cosmin Atodiresei =

Romanian luger (born 1994)

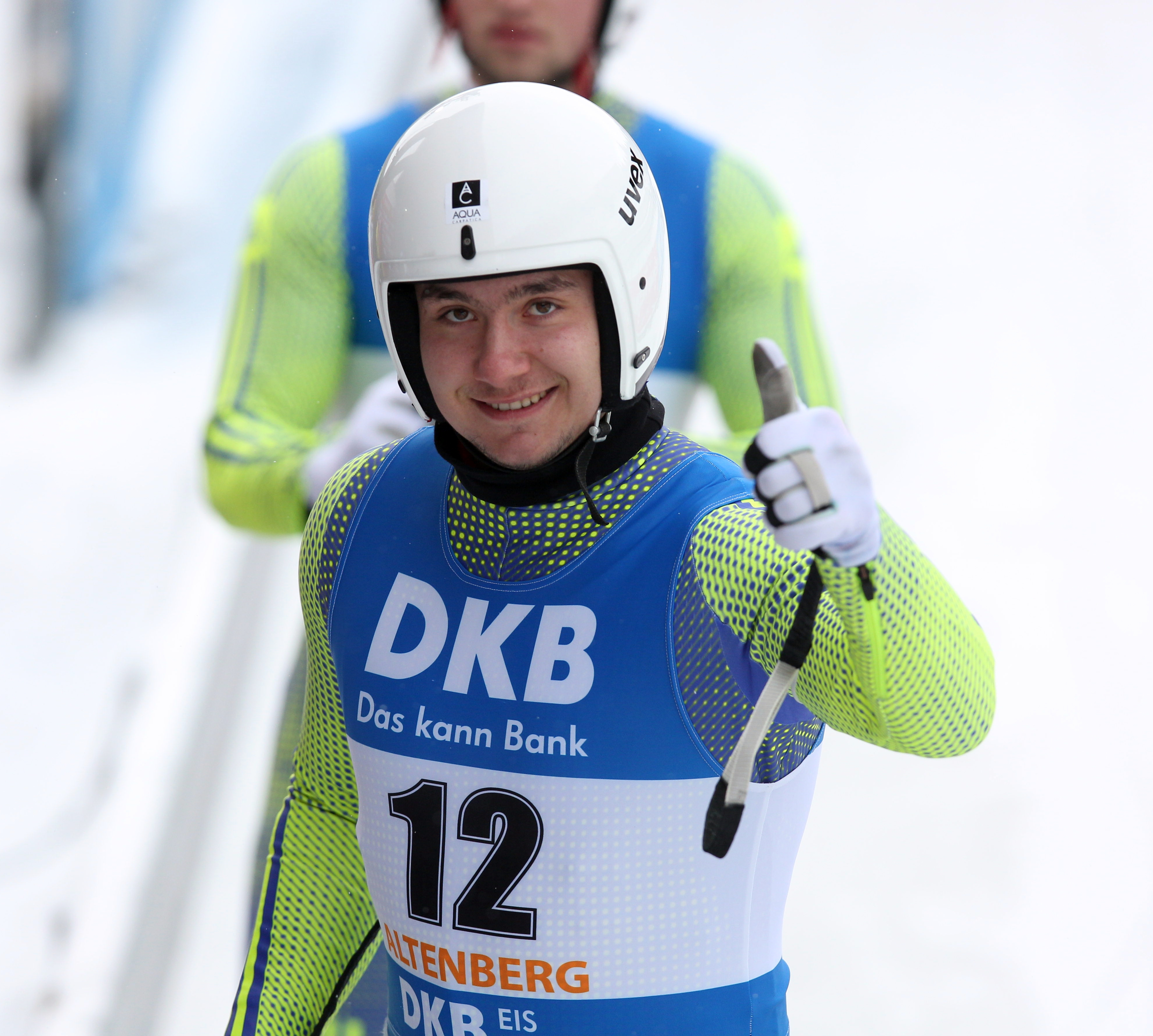
- Cosmin Atodiresei (2017 in Altenberg)

Personal information
- Full name: Cosmin Eugen Atodiresei
- Nationality: Romanian
- Born: 1 March 1994 (age 31); Suceava, Romania

Sport
- Sport: Luge

Cosmin Eugen Atodiresei (born 1 March 1994) is a Romanian luger. He competed in the men's doubles event at the 2018 Winter Olympics.
