= Jaromír Kudera =

Czech luger (born 1990)

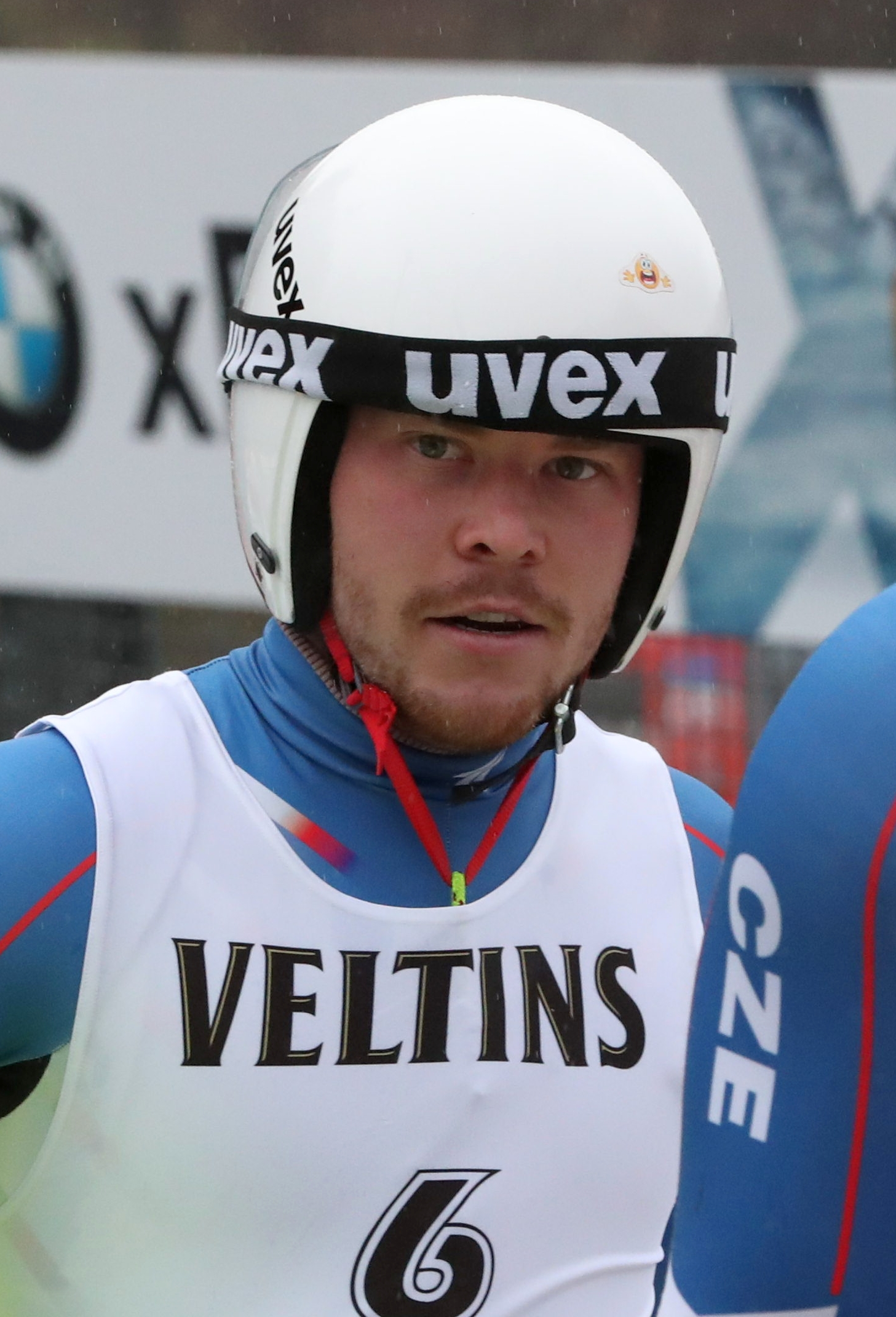
- Kudera in 2017

Personal information
- Nationality: Czech
- Born: 4 August 1990 (age 34)

Sport
- Sport: Luge

Jaromír Kudera (born 4 August 1990) is a Czech luger. He competed in the men's doubles event at the 2018 Winter Olympics.
