= Antonín Brož =

Czech luger (born 1987)

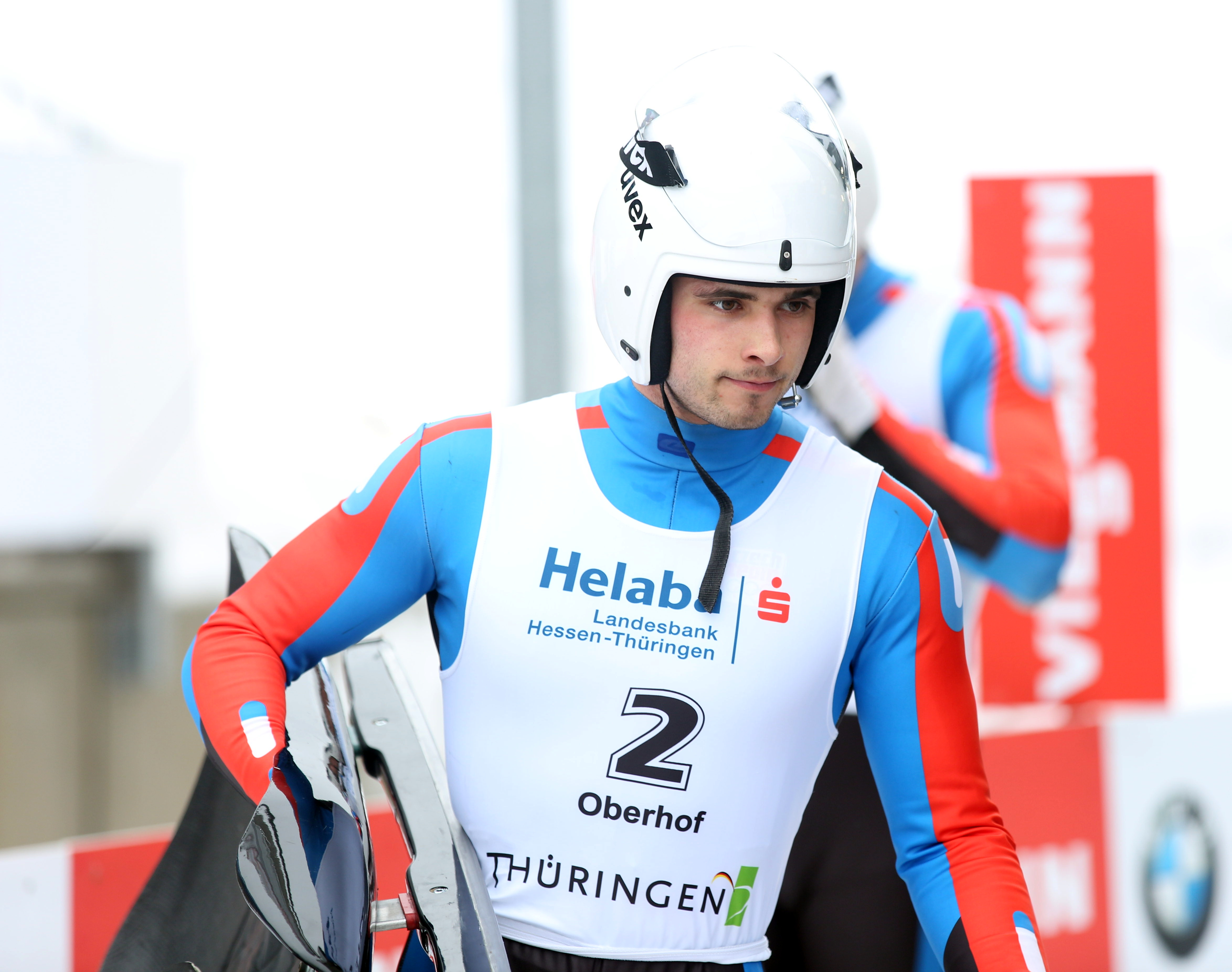
Brož at the 2017 luge world cup in Oberhof.

Antonín Brož (Czech pronunciation: [ˈantoɲiːn ˈbroʃ], born 14 December 1987 in Jablonec nad Nisou) is a Czech luger who has competed since 2002. He finished 16th in the men's doubles event at the 2006 Winter Olympics in Turin.

Brož finish 19th in the men's doubles event at the 2007 FIL World Luge Championships in Igls.

He competes in doubles with his brother Lukáš.
