= Lukáš Brož =

Czech luger (born 1985)

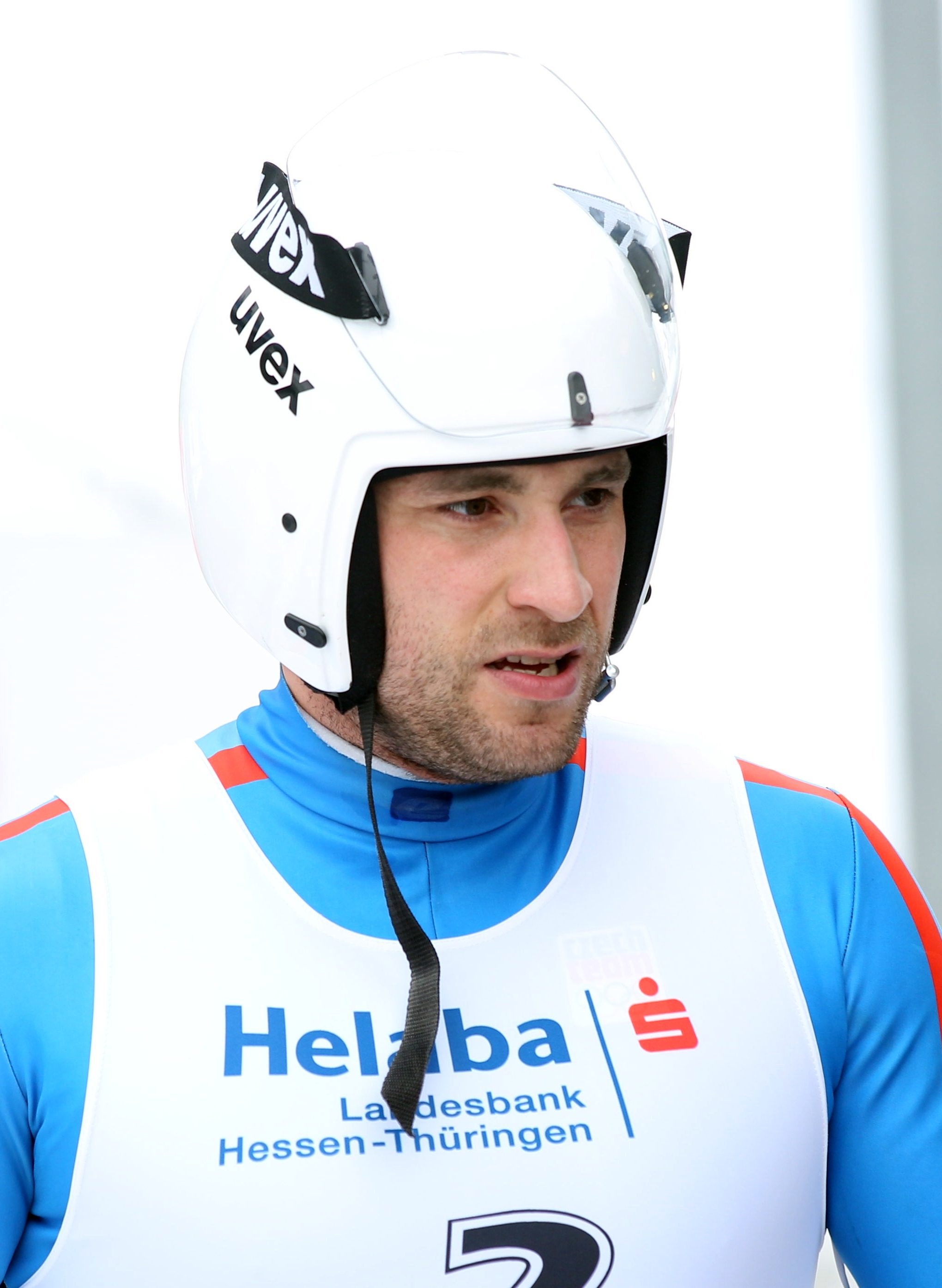
Brož in 2017

Lukáš Brož (Czech pronunciation: [ˈlukaːʒ ˈbroʃ]; born 23 October 1985 in Jablonec nad Nisou) is a Czech luger who has competed since 2000. He finished 16th in the men's doubles event at the 2006 Winter Olympics in Turin.

Brož finish 19th in the men's doubles event at the 2007 FIL World Luge Championships in Igls. He competes in doubles with his brother Antonín.
