= 2022 FIL European Luge Championships – Doubles =

2022 Tennis Championship

Doubles at the 2022 FIL European Luge Championships
- Venue: St. Moritz-Celerina Olympic Bobrun
- Location: St. Moritz, Switzerland
- Dates: 22 January
- Competitors: 42 from 10 nations
- Teams: 21
- Winning time: 1:47.209

Medalists
gold medal	Toni Eggert; Sascha Benecken	Germany
silver medal	Tobias Wendl; Tobias Arlt	Germany
bronze medal	Mārtiņš Bots; Roberts Plūme	Latvia

The doubles competition at the 2022 FIL European Luge Championships was held on 22 January 2022.

== Results ==
The first run was held at 08:43 and the second run at 10:07.

Rank	Bib	Name	Country	Run 1	Rank	Run 2	Rank	Total	Diff
1st place, gold medalist(s)	21	Toni Eggert; Sascha Benecken	Germany	53.585	1	53.624	1	1:47.209	
2nd place, silver medalist(s)	22	Tobias Wendl; Tobias Arlt	Germany	53.652	2	53.670	4	1:47.322	+0.113
3rd place, bronze medalist(s)	19	Mārtiņš Bots; Roberts Plūme	Latvia	53.806	4	53.652	2	1:47.458	+0.249
4	18	Emanuel Rieder; Simon Kainzwaldner	Italy	53.784	3	53.705	6	1:47.489	+0.280
5	20	Andris Šics; Juris Šics	Latvia	53.857	7	53.669	3	1:47.526	+0.317
6	16	Thomas Steu; Lorenz Koller	Austria	53.840	6	53.716	7	1:47.556	+0.347
7	17	Ludwig Rieder; Patrick Rastner	Italy	53.832	5	53.785	8	1:47.617	+0.408
8	15	Andrei Bogdanov; Yuri Prokhorov	Russia	54.020	8	53.673	5	1:47.693	+0.484
9	11	Ivan Nagler; Fabian Malleier	Italy	54.051	11	53.832	9	1:47.883	+0.674
10	12	Aleksandr Denisev; Vladislav Antonov	Russia	54.065	12	53.848	10	1:47.913	+0.704
11	13	Yannick Müller; Armin Frauscher	Austria	54.022	9	53.958	11	1:47.980	+0.781
12	9	Juri Gatt; Riccardo Schöpf	Austria	54.026	10	54.035	12	1:48.061	+0.852
13	10	Vsevolod Kashkin; Konstantin Korshunov	Russia	54.363	13	54.078	13	1:48.441	+1.232
14	8	Wojciech Chmielewski; Jakub Kowalewski	Poland	54.365	15	54.150	14	1:48.515	+1.306
15	6	Tomáš Vaverčák; Matej Zmij	Slovakia	54.364	14	54.364	16	1:48.728	+1.519
16	7	Max Ewald; Jakob Jannusch	Germany	54.634	16	54.320	15	1:48.954	+1.745
17	5	Ihor Stakhiv; Andrii Lysetskyi	Ukraine	54.866	17	54.791	17	1:49.657	+2.448
18	4	Ihor Hoi; Myroslav Levkovych	Ukraine	55.100	18	55.399	19	1:50.499	+3.290
19	2	Filip Vejdělek; Zdeněk Pěkný	Czech Republic	55.458	19	55.784	20	1:51.242	+4.033
20	1	Ionuț Șișcanu; Iulian Oprea	Moldova	55.663	20	55.928	21	1:51.591	+4.382
21	3	Vadym Mykyievych; Bohdan Babura	Ukraine	58.961	21	55.075	18	1:54.036	+6.827
