= 2022 FIL European Luge Championships – Team relay =

Team relay at the 2022 FIL European Luge Championships
- Venue: St. Moritz-Celerina Olympic Bobrun
- Location: St. Moritz, Switzerland
- Dates: 23 January
- Competitors: 36 from 9 nations
- Teams: 9
- Winning time: 2:47.101

Medalists
gold medal	Elīna Ieva Vītola; Kristers Aparjods; Mārtiņš Bots; Roberts Plūme	Latvia
silver medal	Natalie Geisenberger; Johannes Ludwig; Toni Eggert; Sascha Benecken	Germany
bronze medal	Tatiana Ivanova; Roman Repilov; Andrei Bogdanov; Yuri Prokhorov	Russia

The team relay competition at the 2022 FIL European Luge Championships was held on 23 January 2022.

== Results ==
The event was started at 13:03.

Rank	Bib	Athlete	Country	Women's singles	Men's singles	Doubles	Total	Behind
1st place, gold medalist(s)	8–1; 8–2; 8–3	Elīna Ieva Vītola; Kristers Aparjods; Mārtiņš Bots / Roberts Plūme	Latvia	55.228	55.565	56.308	2:47.101	
2nd place, silver medalist(s)	10–1; 10–2; 10–3	Natalie Geisenberger; Johannes Ludwig; Toni Eggert / Sascha Benecken	Germany	55.311	55.716	56.201	2:47.228	+0.127
3rd place, bronze medalist(s)	7–1; 7–2; 7–3	Tatiana Ivanova; Roman Repilov; Andrei Bogdanov / Yuri Prokhorov	Russia	55.478	55.858	56.440	2:47.776	+0.675
4	6–1; 6–2; 6–3	Andrea Vötter; Dominik Fischnaller; Emanuel Rieder / Simon Kainzwaldner	Italy	55.578	55.914	56.734	2:48.226	+1.125
5	1–1; 1–2; 1–3	Olena Stetskiv; Anton Dukach; Ihor Stakhiv / Andrii Lysetskyi	Ukraine	55.968	56.374	57.628	2:49.970	+2.869
6	4–1; 4–2; 4–3	Klaudia Domaradzka; Mateusz Sochowicz; Wojciech Chmielewski / Jakub Kowalewski	Poland	56.587	56.698	56.709	2:49.994	+2.893
7	3–1; 3–2; 3–3	Katarína Šimoňáková; Jozef Ninis; Tomáš Vaverčák / Matej Zmij	Slovakia	56.515	56.918	56.854	2:50.287	+3.186
8	2–1; 2–2; 2–3	Anna Čežíková; Michael Lejsek; Filip Vejdělek / Zdeněk Pěkný	Czech Republic	56.812	57.560	58.186	2:52.558	+5.457
	9–1; 9–2; 9–3	Madeleine Egle; Wolfgang Kindl; Thomas Steu / Lorenz Koller	Austria	Disqualified				
