= Latvia at the 2022 Winter Olympics =

- Flag of Latvia
- IOC code: LAT
- NOC: Latvian Olympic Committee
- Website: www.olimpiade.lv (in Latvian)

in Beijing, China 4–20 February 2022
- Competitors: 60 (49 men and 11 women) in 11 sports
- Flag bearers (opening): Lauris Dārziņš; Elīza Tīruma
- Flag bearer (closing): Matīss Miknis
- Medals Ranked 27th: Gold 0 Silver 0 Bronze 1 Total 1

Winter Olympics appearances (overview)
- 1924; 1928; 1932; 1936; 1948–1988; 1992; 1994; 1998; 2002; 2006; 2010; 2014; 2018; 2022; 2026

Other related appearances
- Soviet Union (1956–1988)

Latvia competed in the 2022 Winter Olympics in Beijing, China, from 4 — 20 February 2022, gaining 1 medal.

Lauris Dārziņš and Elīza Tīruma were the country's flagbearers during the opening ceremony. Meanwhile, bobsledder, Matīss Miknis was the flagbearer during the closing ceremony.

== Competitors ==
The following is a list of the number of competitors participating at the Games per sport.

Sport	Men	Women	Total
Alpine skiing	1	1	2
Biathlon	0	1	1
Bobsleigh	5	0	5
Cross-country skiing	2	5	7
Figure skating	1	0	1
Ice hockey	27	0	27
Luge	7	3	10
Nordic combined	1	—N/a	1
Short track speed skating	2	0	2
Skeleton	2	1	3
Speed skating	1	0	1
Total	49	11	60

== Medalists ==
The following Latvian competitors won medals at the games. In the discipline sections below, the medalists' names are bolded.

Medal	Name	Sport	Event	Date
Bronze	Elīza Tīruma; Kristers Aparjods; Mārtiņš Bots; Roberts Plūme	Luge	Team relay	10 February

== Alpine skiing ==
By meeting the basic qualification standards Latvia qualified one male (Miks Edgars Zvejnieks) and one female (Liene Bondare) alpine skier.

Athlete	Event	Run 1		Run 2		Total	
Athlete	Event	Time	Rank	Time	Rank	Time	Rank
Miks Edgars Zvejnieks	Men's giant slalom	1:09.59	33	1:13.04	26	2:22.63	26
Miks Edgars Zvejnieks	Men's slalom	DNF		did not advance			
Liene Bondare	Women's slalom	1:00.45	48	DNF			

== Biathlon ==
Athlete	Event	Time	Misses	Rank
Baiba Bendika	Women's sprint	23:20.7	3 (1+2)	50
Baiba Bendika	Women's pursuit	41:11.9	6 (2+1+2+1)	48
Baiba Bendika	Women's individual	51:10.3	6 (1+3+0+2)	58

== Bobsleigh ==
Men

Athlete	Event	Run 1		Run 2		Run 3		Run 4		Total	
Athlete	Event	Time	Rank	Time	Rank	Time	Rank	Time	Rank	Time	Rank
Oskars Ķibermanis*; Matīss Miknis	Two-man	59.65	10	59.94	7	59.82	10	59.93	5	3:59.34	9
Emīls Cipulis*; Edgars Nemme	Two-man	1:00.00	18	1:00.24	16	1:00.20	16	1:00.46	18	4:00.90	17
Oskars Ķibermanis*; Dāvis Spriņģis; Matīss Miknis; Edgars Nemme	Four-man	58.70	7	58.86	2	58.41	4	59.30	=5	3:55.27	5

* – Denotes the driver of the sled

== Cross-country skiing ==
Latvia qualified two male and five female cross-country skiers.

Distance
Men

Athlete	Event	Classical		Freestyle		Total		
Athlete	Event	Time	Rank	Time	Rank	Time	Deficit	Rank
Roberts Slotiņš	15 km classical	—N/a				44:44.8	+6:50.0	74
Raimo Vīgants	15 km classical	—N/a				43:10.9	+5:16.1	62
Raimo Vīgants	30 km skiathlon	44:05.9	50	LAP				51
Roberts Slotiņš	50 km freestyle	—N/a				1:24:46.4	+13:13.7	54
Raimo Vīgants	50 km freestyle	—N/a				1:18:55.2	+7:22.5	44

Women

Athlete	Event	Classical		Freestyle		Total		
Athlete	Event	Time	Rank	Time	Rank	Time	Deficit	Rank
Kitija Auziņa	10 km classical	—N/a				33:26.3	+5:20.0	68
Patrīcija Eiduka	10 km classical	—N/a				30:34.7	+2:28.4	23
Samanta Krampe	10 km classical	—N/a				39:34.2	+11:27.9	93
Estere Volfa	10 km classical	—N/a				36:36.9	+8:30.6	84
Patrīcija Eiduka	15 km skiathlon	DNS						-
Baiba Bendika	30 km freestyle	—N/a				1:33:37.8	+8:43.8	31
Patrīcija Eiduka	30 km freestyle	—N/a				1:33:51.2	+8:57.2	32
Patrīcija Eiduka; Kitija Auziņa; Estere Volfa; Samanta Krampe	4 × 5 km relay	—N/a				1:01:20.6	+7:39.6	17

Sprint

Athlete	Event	Qualification		Quarterfinals		Semifinals		Final	
Athlete	Event	Time	Rank	Time	Rank	Time	Rank	Time	Rank
Roberts Slotiņš	Men's sprint	3:07.41	70	did not advance					
Raimo Vīgants	Men's sprint	2:53.98	28 **Q**	3:06.63	4	did not advance			20
Roberts Slotiņš; Raimo Vīgants	Men's team sprint	—N/a				21:06.82	11	Did not advance	21
Kitija Auziņa	Women's sprint	3:51.60	76	did not advance					
Patrīcija Eiduka	Women's sprint	3:24.32	32	did not advance					
Samanta Krampe	Women's sprint	3:46.66	73	did not advance					
Estere Volfa	Women's sprint	4:03.36	81	did not advance					
Kitija Auziņa; Estere Volfa	Women's team sprint	—N/a				26:46.26	11	Did not advance	21

== Figure skating ==
In the 2021 World Figure Skating Championships in Stockholm, Sweden, Latvia secured one quota in the men's competition.

Individual

Athlete	Event	SP		FS		Total	
Athlete	Event	Points	Rank	Points	Rank	Points	Rank
Deniss Vasiļjevs	Men's singles	85.30	16 **Q**	167.41	12	252.71	13

== Ice hockey ==
Summary

Key:

- OT – Overtime
- GWS – Match decided by penalty-shootout

Team	Event	Group stage					Qualification playoff	Quarterfinal	Semifinal	Final / BM	
Team	Event	Opposition Score	Opposition Score	Opposition Score	Opposition Score	Rank	Opposition Score	Opposition Score	Opposition Score	Opposition Score	Rank
Latvia men's	Men's tournament	Sweden; **L** 2–3	Finland; **L** 1–3	Slovakia; **L** 2–5	—N/a	4	Denmark; **L** 2–3	did not advance			11

Latvia has qualified 28 male competitors to the ice hockey tournament.

=== Men's tournament ===
Latvia men's national ice hockey team qualified by winning the final qualification tournament.

Team roster

The roster was announced on 24 January 2022.

Head coach: Harijs Vītoliņš

No.	Pos.	Name	Height	Weight	Birthdate	Team
9	F	Renārs Krastenbergs	183 cm (6 ft 0 in)	84 kg (185 lb)	26 December 1998 (aged 23)	(Austria) EC VSV
10	F	Lauris Dārziņš (**C**)	191 cm (6 ft 3 in)	91 kg (201 lb)	28 January 1985 (aged 37)	(Latvia) Dinamo Riga
14	F	Rihards Bukarts	178 cm (5 ft 10 in)	84 kg (185 lb)	31 December 1995 (aged 26)	(Russia) Admiral Vladivostok
15	F	Mārtiņš Karsums	178 cm (5 ft 10 in)	98 kg (216 lb)	26 February 1986 (aged 35)	(Latvia) Dinamo Riga
16	F	Kaspars Daugaviņš	183 cm (6 ft 0 in)	100 kg (220 lb)	18 May 1988 (aged 33)	(Switzerland) SC Bern
17	F	Mārtiņš Dzierkals	183 cm (6 ft 0 in)	84 kg (185 lb)	4 April 1997 (aged 24)	(Czech Republic) HC Škoda Plzeň
18	F	Rodrigo Ābols (**A**)	193 cm (6 ft 4 in)	85 kg (187 lb)	5 January 1996 (aged 26)	(Sweden) Örebro HK
23	D	Kārlis Čukste	193 cm (6 ft 4 in)	100 kg (220 lb)	17 June 1997 (aged 24)	(Latvia) Dinamo Riga
24	D	Patriks Ozols	180 cm (5 ft 11 in)	84 kg (185 lb)	2 February 2001 (aged 21)	(Latvia) Dinamo Riga
25	F	Andris Džeriņš	185 cm (6 ft 1 in)	87 kg (192 lb)	14 February 1988 (aged 33)	(Austria) Steinbach Black Wings 1992
26	D	Uvis Balinskis	178 cm (5 ft 10 in)	76 kg (168 lb)	1 August 1996 (aged 25)	(Czech Republic) HC Verva Litvínov
27	D	Oskars Cibuļskis (**A**)	188 cm (6 ft 2 in)	86 kg (190 lb)	9 April 1988 (aged 33)	(Latvia) Dinamo Riga
29	D	Ralfs Freibergs	180 cm (5 ft 11 in)	87 kg (192 lb)	17 May 1991 (aged 30)	(Latvia) Dinamo Riga
32	D	Artūrs Kulda	188 cm (6 ft 2 in)	98 kg (216 lb)	25 July 1988 (aged 33)	(Germany) Krefeld Pinguine
48	D	Nauris Sējējs	180 cm (5 ft 11 in)	84 kg (185 lb)	15 March 2001 (aged 20)	(Switzerland) HC La Chaux-de-Fonds
50	G	Kristers Gudļevskis	193 cm (6 ft 4 in)	89 kg (196 lb)	31 July 1992 (aged 29)	(Sweden) Brynäs IF
55	D	Roberts Mamčics	195 cm (6 ft 5 in)	105 kg (231 lb)	6 April 1995 (aged 26)	(Czech Republic) PSG Berani Zlín
69	F	Nikolajs Jeļisejevs	180 cm (5 ft 11 in)	86 kg (190 lb)	7 July 1994 (aged 27)	(Latvia) Dinamo Riga
70	F	Miks Indrašis	191 cm (6 ft 3 in)	85 kg (187 lb)	30 September 1990 (aged 31)	(Russia) Admiral Vladivostok
72	D	Jānis Jaks	185 cm (6 ft 1 in)	86 kg (190 lb)	22 August 1995 (aged 26)	(Russia) HC Sochi
73	F	Deniss Smirnovs	178 cm (5 ft 10 in)	82 kg (181 lb)	7 March 1999 (aged 22)	(Switzerland) Genève-Servette HC
74	G	Ivars Punnenovs	185 cm (6 ft 1 in)	85 kg (187 lb)	30 May 1994 (aged 27)	(Switzerland) SCL Tigers
77	D	Kristaps Zīle	185 cm (6 ft 1 in)	85 kg (187 lb)	24 December 1997 (aged 24)	(Latvia) Dinamo Riga
87	F	Gints Meija	185 cm (6 ft 1 in)	80 kg (180 lb)	4 September 1987 (aged 34)	(Latvia) Dinamo Riga
91	F	Ronalds Ķēniņš	183 cm (6 ft 0 in)	91 kg (201 lb)	28 February 1991 (aged 30)	(Switzerland) Lausanne HC
95	F	Oskars Batņa	195 cm (6 ft 5 in)	100 kg (220 lb)	7 May 1995 (aged 26)	(Finland) Mikkelin Jukurit
98	G	Jānis Kalniņš	183 cm (6 ft 0 in)	87 kg (192 lb)	13 December 1991 (aged 30)	(Sweden) Växjö Lakers HC

Group play

Pos	Team	Pld	W	OTW	OTL	L	GF	GA	GD	Pts	Qualification
1	Finland	3	2	1	0	0	13	6	+7	**8**	Quarterfinals
2	Sweden	3	2	0	1	0	10	7	+3	**7**	Quarterfinals
3	Slovakia	3	1	0	0	2	8	12	−4	**3**	Playoffs
4	Latvia	3	0	0	0	3	5	11	−6	**0**	Playoffs

Source: IIHF
Rules for classification: Preliminary round tiebreakers

February 10, 2022; 12:10 v	**Sweden**	**3–2** (1–0, 2–1, 0–1)	Latvia	Beijing National Indoor Stadium, Beijing; Attendance: 873

Game reference

Lars Johansson
Goalies
Ivars Punnenovs
Referees:
(Czech Republic) Martin Fraňo
(Finland) Kristian Vikman
Linesmen:
(United States) William Hancock
(Russia) Nikita Shalagin

Wallmark (Holmberg, Olofsson) – 09:42	1–0
Lander (Bromé, Klingberg) – 20:30	2–0
Wallmark (Tömmernes, Pudas) (PP) – 33:39	3–0
	3–1	36:07 – Krastenbergs (Balinskis, Dārziņš) (PP)
	3–2	46:48 – Jeļisejevs (Dārziņš, Balinskis) (PP)

8 min
Penalties
10 min
26
Shots
17

February 11, 2022; 21:10 v	Latvia	**1–3** (0–0, 0–1, 1–2)	**Finland**	Wukesong Arena, Beijing; Attendance: 904

Game reference

Jānis Kalniņš
Goalies
Harri Säteri
Referees:
(Canada) Oliver Gouin
(Sweden) Mikael Nord
Linesmen:
(Sweden) Ludvig Lundgren
(Russia) Dmitry Shishlo

	0–1	37:59 – Kemiläinen (Lehtonen, Nättinen)
Ābols (Krastenbergs, Smirnovs) (PP) – 43:01	1–1
	1–2	54:42 – Komarov (Hietanen, Ohtamaa)
	1–3	58:43 – Anttila (Mäenalanen, Lindbohm)

6 min
Penalties
4 min
20
Shots
38

February 13, 2022; 12:10 v	**Slovakia**	**5–2** (1–1, 2–0, 2–1)	Latvia	Beijing National Indoor Stadium, Beijing; Attendance: 943

Game reference

Patrik Rybár
Goalies
Jānis Kalniņš
Referees:
(Canada) Oliver Gouin
(Sweden) Mikael Nord
Linesmen:
(Sweden) Ludvig Lundgren
(Russia) Dmitry Shishlo

Marinčin (Jurčo, Hudáček) – 11:00	1–0
	1–1	15:46 – Ķēniņš (Ābols, Krastenbergs)
Cehlárik (Hrivík, Takáč) – 26:17	2–1
Slafkovský – 31:16	3–1
	3–2	42:07 – Indrašis (Meija, Cibuļskis)
Zuzin (Kelemen, Čerešňák) – 49:21	4–2
Jurčo (ENG) – 59:59	5–2

4 min
Penalties
2 min
33
Shots
20

Playoffs

February 15, 2022; 12:10 v	**Denmark**	**3–2** (1–1, 1–1, 1–0)	Latvia	Wukesong Arena, Beijing; Attendance: 726

Game reference

Sebastian Dahm
Goalies
Jānis Kalniņš
Ivars Punnenovs
Referees:
(United States) Andrew Bruggema
(Germany) André Schrader
Linesmen:
(Canada) Dustin McCrank
(Russia) Dmitry Shishlo

Poulsen (Jakobsen, Lassen) – 12:02	1–0
	1–1	16:23 – Dārziņš (Krastenbergs, Cibuļskis)
	1–2	22:33 – Dārzinš (Balinskis, Krastenbergs) (PP)
Jakobsen (Meyer) – 36:57	2–2
Lauridsen (Bødker, Nielsen) (PP) – 41:45	3–2

8 min
Penalties
8 min
31
Shots
27

== Nordic combined ==
Athlete	Event	Ski jumping			Cross-country		Total	
Athlete	Event	Distance	Points	Rank	Time	Rank	Time	Rank
Markuss Vinogradovs	Individual normal hill/10 km	72.0	55.0	43	29:22.4	44	34:34.4	44
Markuss Vinogradovs	Individual large hill/10 km	88.0	30.9	47	DNF			

== Luge ==
Based on the results from the 2021–22 Luge World Cup season, Latvia qualified 8 sleds.

Men

Athlete	Event	Run 1		Run 2		Run 3		Run 4		Total	
Athlete	Event	Time	Rank	Time	Rank	Time	Rank	Time	Rank	Time	Rank
Kristers Aparjods	Singles	57.364	4	57.597	6	57.399	4	57.693	9	3:50.053	5
Gints Bērziņš	Singles	57.414	7	57.709	7	57.480	6	57.570	7	3:50.173	7
Artūrs Dārznieks	Singles	58.166	17	59.370	28	57.932	12	58.241	17	3:53.709	18
Mārtiņš Bots; Roberts Plūme	Doubles	58.628	5	58.791	5	—N/a				1:57.419	4
Andris Šics; Juris Šics	Doubles	58.703	6	58.734	4	—N/a				1:57.437	5

Women

Athlete	Event	Run 1		Run 2		Run 3		Run 4		Total	
Athlete	Event	Time	Rank	Time	Rank	Time	Rank	Time	Rank	Time	Rank
Kendija Aparjode	Singles	59.107	13	59.020	7	58.928	15	59.084	12	3:56.139	11
Elīza Tīruma	Singles	58.956	8	58.849	6	58.865	11	58.771	8	3:55.441	8
Elīna Ieva Vītola	Singles	59.025	12	59.140	14	59.029	17	1:00.957	18	3:58.151	18

Mixed team relay

Athlete	Event	Run 1		Run 2		Run 3		Total	
Athlete	Event	Time	Rank	Time	Rank	Time	Rank	Time	Rank
**Elīza Tīruma**; **Kristers Aparjods**; **Mārtiņš Bots**; **Roberts Plūme**	Team relay	1:00.578	5	1:01.451	3	1:02.325	5	3:04.354	3rd place, bronze medalist(s)

== Short track speed skating ==
Latvia has qualified two male short track speed skaters.

Athlete	Event	Heat		Quarterfinal		Semifinal		Final	
Athlete	Event	Time	Rank	Time	Rank	Time	Rank	Time	Rank
Reinis Bērziņš	Men's 1500 m	—N/a		2:15.371	5 **ADV**	2:14.714	4 **QB**	2:18.499	15
Roberts Krūzbergs	Men's 500 m	40.430	3 **q**	40.694	3 **q**	41.870	5 **QB**	41.465	9
Roberts Krūzbergs	Men's 1000 m	1:23.979	3	did not advance					20
Roberts Krūzbergs	Men's 1500 m	—N/a		2:10.999	5	did not advance			26

== Skeleton ==
Athlete	Event	Run 1		Run 2		Run 3		Run 4		Total	
Athlete	Event	Time	Rank	Time	Rank	Time	Rank	Time	Rank	Time	Rank
Martins Dukurs	Men's	1:00.62	6	1:00.62	3	1:00.40	4	1:01.12	13	4:02.76	7
Tomass Dukurs	Men's	1:00.76	8	1:00.79	7	1:00.74	10	1:00.92	10	4:03.21	9
Endija Tērauda	Women's	1:02.98	20	1:03.15	19	1:02.65	18	1:02.79	17	4:11.57	20

== Speed skating ==
Individual

Athlete	Event	Race	
Athlete	Event	Time	Rank
Haralds Silovs	Men's 1500 metres	1:48.24	24

Mass start

Athlete	Event	Semifinal			Final		
Athlete	Event	Points	Time	Rank	Points	Time	Rank
Haralds Silovs	Men's mass start	3	7:59.50	9	did not advance		17

== See also ==
- Latvia at the Olympics
- Latvia at the 2022 Winter Paralympics
