= Ihor Stakhiv =

Ukrainian luger (born 1999)

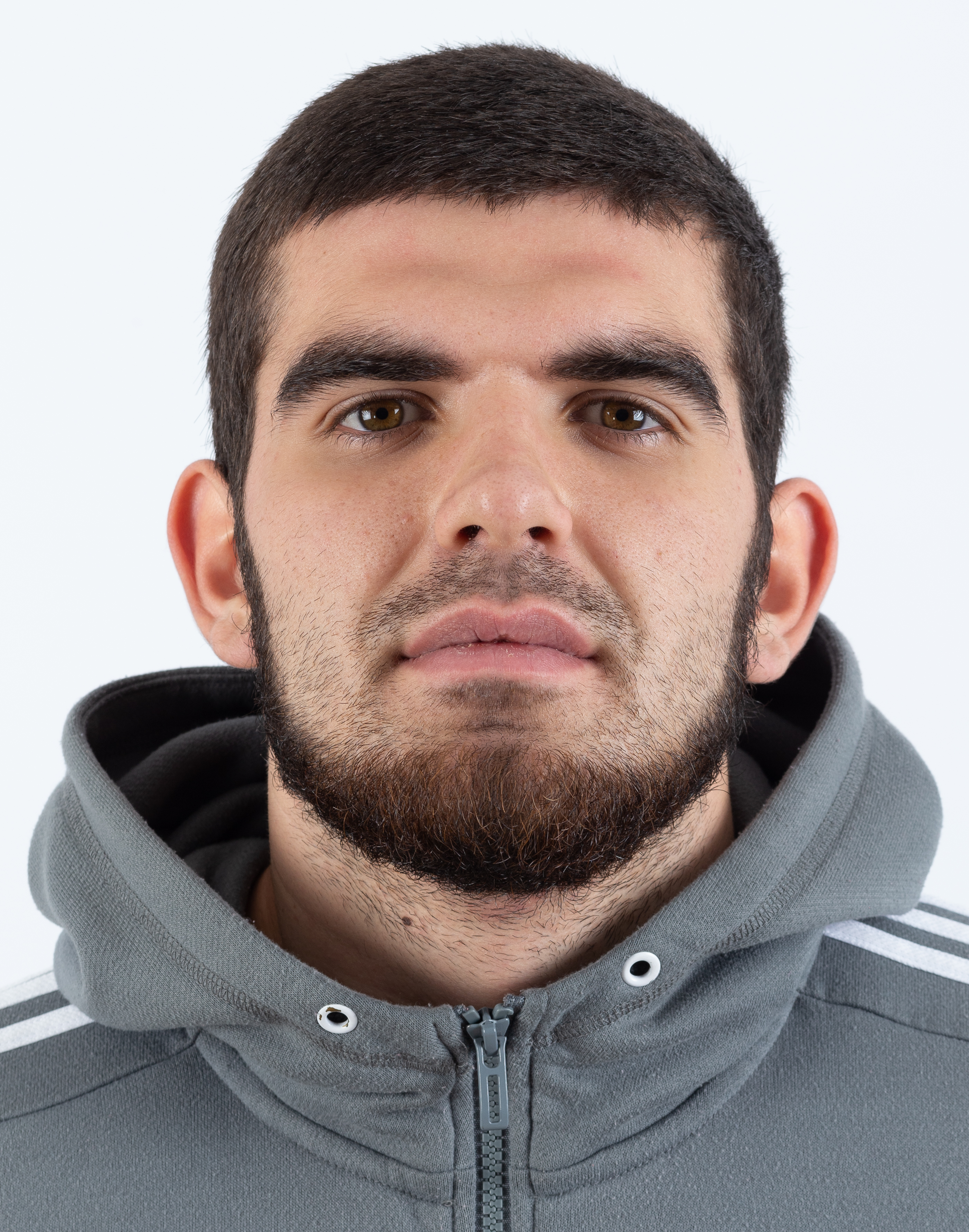
- Stakhiv in 2018

Personal information
- Native name: Ігор Олегович Стахів
- Full name: Ihor Olehovych Stakhiv
- Nationality: Ukrainian
- Born: 30 July 1999 (age 26) Lviv, Ukraine

Sport
- Country: Ukraine
- Sport: Luge
- Event: Men's doubles (previously singles)

Ihor Olehovych Stakhiv (Ukrainian: Ігор Олегович Стахів, born 30 July 1999 in Lviv, Ukraine) is a Ukrainian retired luger.

== Career ==
Stakhiv started his sporting career as a singles rider. At the 2016 Winter Youth Olympics in Lillehammer, Norway, he finished 13th in the boys' singles competition. He was also 7th in team relay (together with Smaha, Lysetskyy, and Levkovych).

Stakhiv's first World Cup season was the 2016-17 season when he competed in Pyeongchang, South Korea. He finished 33rd in his first and only singles race at the World Cup.

Later, he switched to doubles and was teamed with Andrii Lysetskyi. Their first World Cup race was during the 2018-19 season in Igls, Austria, where they finished 20th. As of February 2022, Stakhiv's best World Cup finish was 10th in the 2019-20 season in Winterberg, Germany.

In 2022, Stakhiv was nominated for his first Winter Games in Beijing, where they placed 15th. He retired from competitive sports after the season.

== Personal life ==
Dukach studied physical culture and sports at the Lviv State University of Physical Culture.

== Career results ==
=== Winter Olympics ===
Year	Event	Doubles	Relay
2022	Beijing, China	15	11

=== World Championships ===
Year	Event	Doubles	Relay	Doubles Sprint
2019	Winterberg, Germany	19	9	18
2021	Königssee, Germany	19	7	21

=== European Championships ===
Year	Event	Doubles	Relay
2019	Oberhof, Germany	11	7
2020	Lillehammer, Norway	14	8
2021	Sigulda, Latvia	16	6
2022	St. Moritz, Switzerland	17	5

=== Luge World Cup ===
==== Rankings ====
Season	Singles	Doubles	Doubles Sprint
2016–17	61		
2018–19		20	
2019–20		18	
2020–21		16	19
2021–22		20	
