= Andrii Lysetskyi =

Ukrainian luger (born 1998)

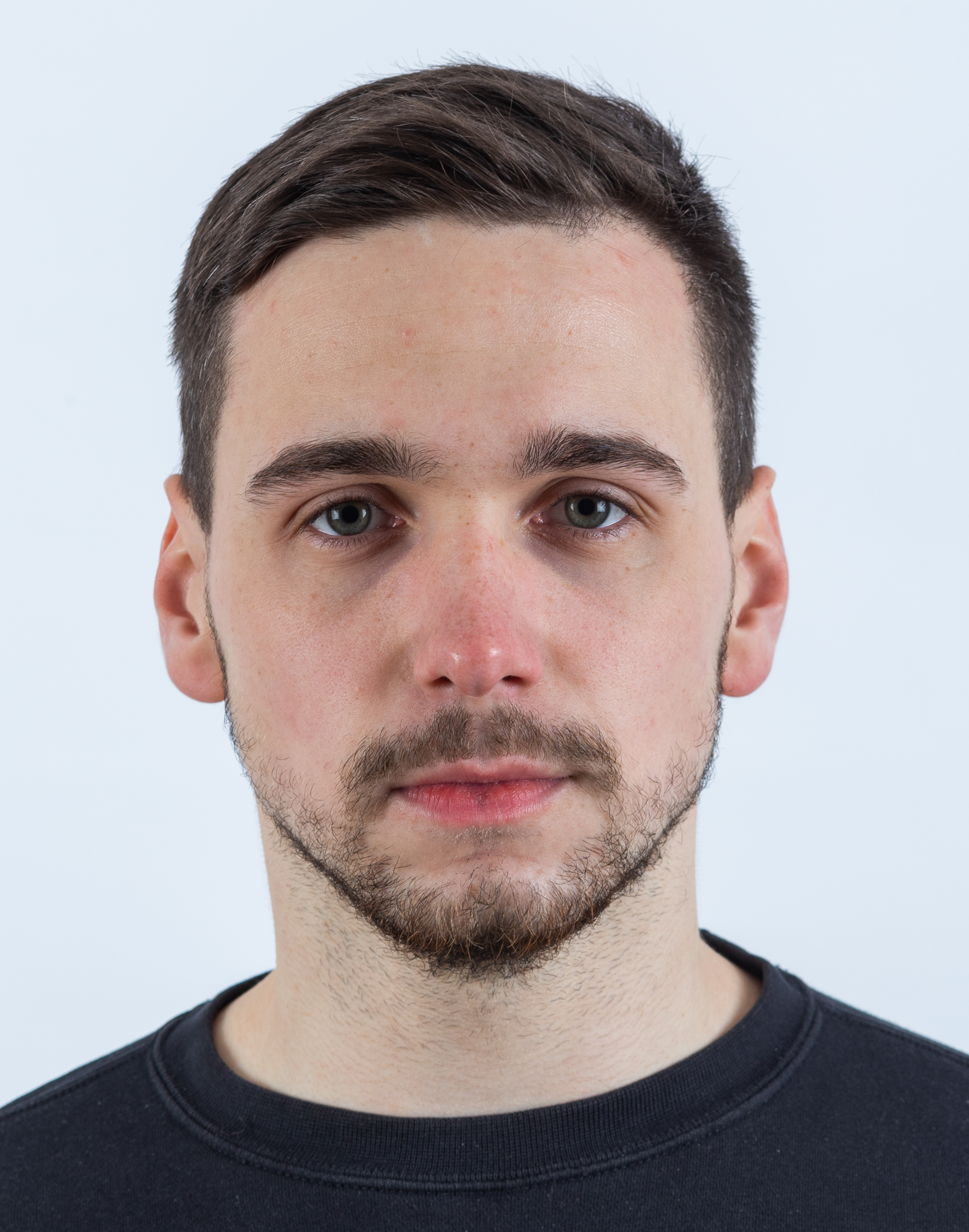
- Lysetskyi in 2018

Personal information
- Native name: Андрій Володимирович Лисецький
- Full name: Andrii Volodymyrovych Lysetskyi
- Nationality: Ukrainian
- Born: 10 February 1998 (age 27) Lviv, Ukraine

Sport
- Country: Ukraine
- Sport: Luge
- Event: Men's doubles

Andrii Volodymyrovych Lysetskyi (Ukrainian: Андрій Володимирович Лисецький, born 10 February 1998) is a Ukrainian retired luger.

== Career ==
At the 2016 Winter Youth Olympics in Lillehammer, Norway, Lysetskyi placed 13th in the doubles competition, together with Levkovych. He was also 7th in team relay (together with Smaha, Stakhiv, and Levkovych).

Later on, Lysetskyi was teamed with Ihor Stakhiv. His first World Cup race was during the 2018-19 season in Igls, Austria, where he finished 20th in the doubles. As of February 2022, Lysetskyi's best World Cup finish was 10th in the 2019-20 season in Winterberg, Germany.

In 2022, Lysetskyi was nominated for his first Winter Games in Beijing, placing 15th in the doubles event. He retired from competitive sports after the season.

== Personal life ==
Lysetskyi studied radio technologies at the Lviv Polytechnic.

== Career results ==
=== Winter Olympics ===
Year	Event	Doubles	Relay
2022	Beijing, China	15	11

=== World Championships ===
Year	Event	Doubles	Relay	Doubles Sprint
2019	Winterberg, Germany	19	9	18
2021	Königssee, Germany	19	7	21

=== European Championships ===
Year	Event	Doubles	Relay
2019	Oberhof, Germany	11	7
2020	Lillehammer, Norway	14	8
2021	Sigulda, Latvia	16	6
2022	St. Moritz, Switzerland	17	5

=== Luge World Cup ===
==== Rankings ====
Season	Doubles	Doubles Sprint
2016–17		
2018–19	20	
2019–20	18	
2020–21	16	19
2021–22	20	
