= 2019 FIL European Luge Championships – Doubles =

Doubles at the 2019 FIL European Luge Championships
- Venue: Oberhof bobsleigh, luge, and skeleton track
- Location: Oberhof, Germany
- Dates: 9 February
- Competitors: 30 from 8 nations
- Teams: 15
- Winning time: 1:21.951

Medalists
| gold medal | Tobias Wendl; Tobias Arlt | Germany |
| silver medal | Toni Eggert; Sascha Benecken | Germany |
| bronze medal | Andris Šics; Juris Šics | Latvia |

The Doubles competition at the 2019 FIL European Luge Championships was held on 9 February 2019.

== Results ==
The first run was held at 12:35 and the second run at 14:15.

| Rank | Bib | Name | Country | Run 1 | Rank | Run 2 | Rank | Total | Diff |
|---|---|---|---|---|---|---|---|---|---|
| 1st place, gold medalist(s) | 14 | Tobias Wendl; Tobias Arlt | Germany | 40.963 | 1 | 40.988 | 1 | 1:21.951 | |
| 2nd place, silver medalist(s) | 16 | Toni Eggert; Sascha Benecken | Germany | 41.154 | 2 | 40.997 | 2 | 1:22.151 | +0.200 |
| 3rd place, bronze medalist(s) | 18 | Andris Šics; Juris Šics | Latvia | 41.159 | 3 | 41.115 | 3 | 1:22.274 | +0.323 |
| 4 | 17 | Thomas Steu; Lorenz Koller | Austria | 41.232 | 5 | 41.269 | 4 | 1:22.501 | +0.550 |
| 5 | 7 | Alexander Denisyev; Vladislav Antonov | Russia | 41.275 | 6 | 41.414 | 6 | 1:22.689 | +0.738 |
| 6 | 9 | Kristens Putins; Imants Marcinkēvičs | Latvia | 41.199 | 4 | 41.540 | 10 | 1:22.739 | +0.788 |
| 7 | 13 | Emanuel Rieder; Simon Kainzwaldner | Italy | 41.425 | 10 | 41.352 | 5 | 1:22.777 | +0.826 |
| 8 | 15 | Oskars Gudramovičs; Pēteris Kalniņš | Latvia | 41.332 | 9 | 41.510 | 9 | 1:22.842 | +0.891 |
| 9 | 5 | Vsevolod Kashkin; Konstantin Korshunov | Russia | 41.493 | 11 | 41.459 | 7 | 1:22.952 | +1.001 |
| 10 | 10 | Vladislav Yuzhakov; Iurii Prokhorov | Russia | 41.290 | 7 | 41.814 | 11 | 1:23.104 | +1.153 |
| 11 | 3 | Ihor Stakhiv; Andriy Lysetskyy | Ukraine | 41.919 | 12 | 42.084 | 12 | 1:24.003 | +2.052 |
| 12 | 1 | Filip Vejdělek; Zdeněk Pěkný | Czech Republic | 42.534 | 13 | 42.492 | 13 | 1:25.026 | +3.075 |
| 13 | 12 | Robin Geueke; David Gamm | Germany | 41.330 | 8 | 44.200 | 14 | 1:25.530 | +3.579 |
| 14 | 6 | Wojciech Chmielewski; Jakub Kowalewski | Poland | 48.028 | 14 | 41.471 | 8 | 1:29.499 | +7.548 |
| — | 8 | Ivan Nagler; Fabian Malleier | Italy | Disqualified | | | | | |
