= Luge at the 2022 Winter Olympics – Doubles =

Luge doubles at the XXIV Olympic Winter Games
- Luge pictogram
- Venue: Xiaohaituo Bobsleigh and Luge Track
- Date: 9 February 2022
- Competitors: 34 from 14 nations
- Teams: 17
- Winning time: 1:56.554

Medalists
1st place, gold medalist(s)		Tobias Wendl; Tobias Arlt	Germany
2nd place, silver medalist(s)		Toni Eggert; Sascha Benecken	Germany
3rd place, bronze medalist(s)		Thomas Steu; Lorenz Koller	Austria

The doubles competition in luge at the 2022 Winter Olympics was held on 9 February, at the Xiaohaituo Bobsleigh and Luge Track in Yanqing District, China. Tobias Wendl and Tobias Arlt of Germany, the 2014 and 2018 champions, won the event again. The 2018 bronze medalists, Toni Eggert and Sascha Benecken, won the silver medal. Thomas Steu and Lorenz Koller of Austria won the bronze, their first Olympic medal.

The 2018 silver medalists, Peter Penz and Georg Fischler, retired from competitions. Eggert and Benneken were leading the 2021–22 Luge World Cup before the Olympics, with Wendl and Arlt second. The two pairs were considered to be the prime gold contenders. Andris Šics and Juris Šics, the bronze medalists of the 2014 Olympics, were consistent though the 2021/2022 season and were standing third in the World Cup before the Olympics. In the race, they finished fifth.

== Qualification ==
The qualification is based on the cumulative points of the Olympic Season from 1 July 2021 to January 10, 2022. A total of 36 (18 pairs) quota spots are available to athletes to compete at the games. Each NOC can enter a maximum of three athletes.

In the doubles, all nations with a pair in the top 25 qualified one slot. If there were remaining spots left, the second best sled of each nation in the top 28 was awarded an additional quota, if there were any remaining spots.

On December 17, 2021, the International Luge Federation announced that the qualification system was changed. The qualification system was changed due to training runs being cancelled at the first World Cup, and equipment not being delivered to the following World Cups. The new system saw athletes qualify based on their top four results during the World Cup season, (as opposed to the previous all seven results counting).

On January 19, 2022, the International Luge Federation announced the list of qualified athletes.

=== Summary ===
Number of sleds	Athletes total	Nation
2	16	Germany; Latvia; Austria; ROC
1	20	Italy; Poland; Canada; United States; South Korea; Slovakia; Ukraine; Romania; Czech Republic; China (Note: China's best entry does not rank in the top 25 so would qualify as host.)
18	36	

== Results ==
The second qualified sled from Austria did not start.

Rank	Bib	Athlete	Country	Run 1	Rank	Run 2	Rank	Total	Behind
1st place, gold medalist(s)	5	Tobias Wendl; Tobias Arlt	Germany	58.255 TR	1	58.299	1	1:56.554	
2nd place, silver medalist(s)	2	Toni Eggert; Sascha Benecken	Germany	58.300	2	58.353	2	1:56.653	+0.099
3rd place, bronze medalist(s)	11	Thomas Steu; Lorenz Koller	Austria	58.426	3	58.639	3	1:57.065	+0.511
4	3	Mārtiņš Bots; Roberts Plūme	Latvia	58.628	5	58.791	5	1:57.419	+0.865
5	1	Andris Šics; Juris Šics	Latvia	58.703	6	58.734	4	1:57.437	+0.883
6	4	Emanuel Rieder; Simon Kainzwaldner	Italy	58.602	4	58.995	7	1:57.597	+1.043
7	10	Tristan Walker; Justin Snith	Canada	58.895	7	59.023	8	1:57.918	+1.364
8	8	Alexander Denisyev; Vladislav Antonov	ROC	59.040	9	58.953	6	1:57.993	+1.439
9	7	Wojciech Chmielewski; Jakub Kowalewski	Poland	58.992	8	59.073	9	1:58.065	+1.511
10	6	Andrei Bogdanov; Yuri Prokhorov	ROC	59.376	11	59.132	11	1:58.508	+1.954
11	15	Zack DiGregorio; Sean Hollander	United States	59.389	12	59.126	10	1:58.515	+1.961
12	12	Park Jin-yong; Cho Jung-myung	South Korea	59.361	10	59.366	12	1:58.727	+2.173
13	9	Tomáš Vaverčák; Matej Zmij	Slovakia	1:00.138	15	59.704	13	1:59.842	+3.288
14	13	Vasile Gîtlan; Darius Şerban	Romania	59.694	13	1:00.243	16	1:59.937	+3.383
15	14	Ihor Stakhiv; Andrii Lysetskyi	Ukraine	59.983	14	1:00.080	15	2:00.063	+3.509
16	17	Filip Vejdělek; Zdeněk Pěkný	Czech Republic	1:00.248	16	59.869	14	2:00.117	+3.563
17	16	Huang Yebo; Peng Junyue	China	1:00.732	17	1:00.840	17	2:01.572	+5.018
