= 2021–22 Luge World Cup =

2021–2022 season of the Luge World Cup

Winners
- Men's singles Overall: (Germany) Johannes Ludwig (1)
- Men's singles: (Germany) Johannes Ludwig (1)
- Men's sprint: (Austria) Wolfgang Kindl (2)
- Doubles Overall: (Germany) Toni Eggert / Sascha Benecken (6)
- Doubles: (Germany) Toni Eggert / Sascha Benecken (1)
- Doubles sprint: (Latvia) Andris Šics / Juris Šics (3)
- Women's singles Overall: (Germany) Julia Taubitz (2)
- Women's singles: (Austria) Madeleine Egle (1)
- Women's sprint: (Germany) Julia Taubitz (3)
- Team relay: Germany (16)

Competitions
- Venues: 9/9 events

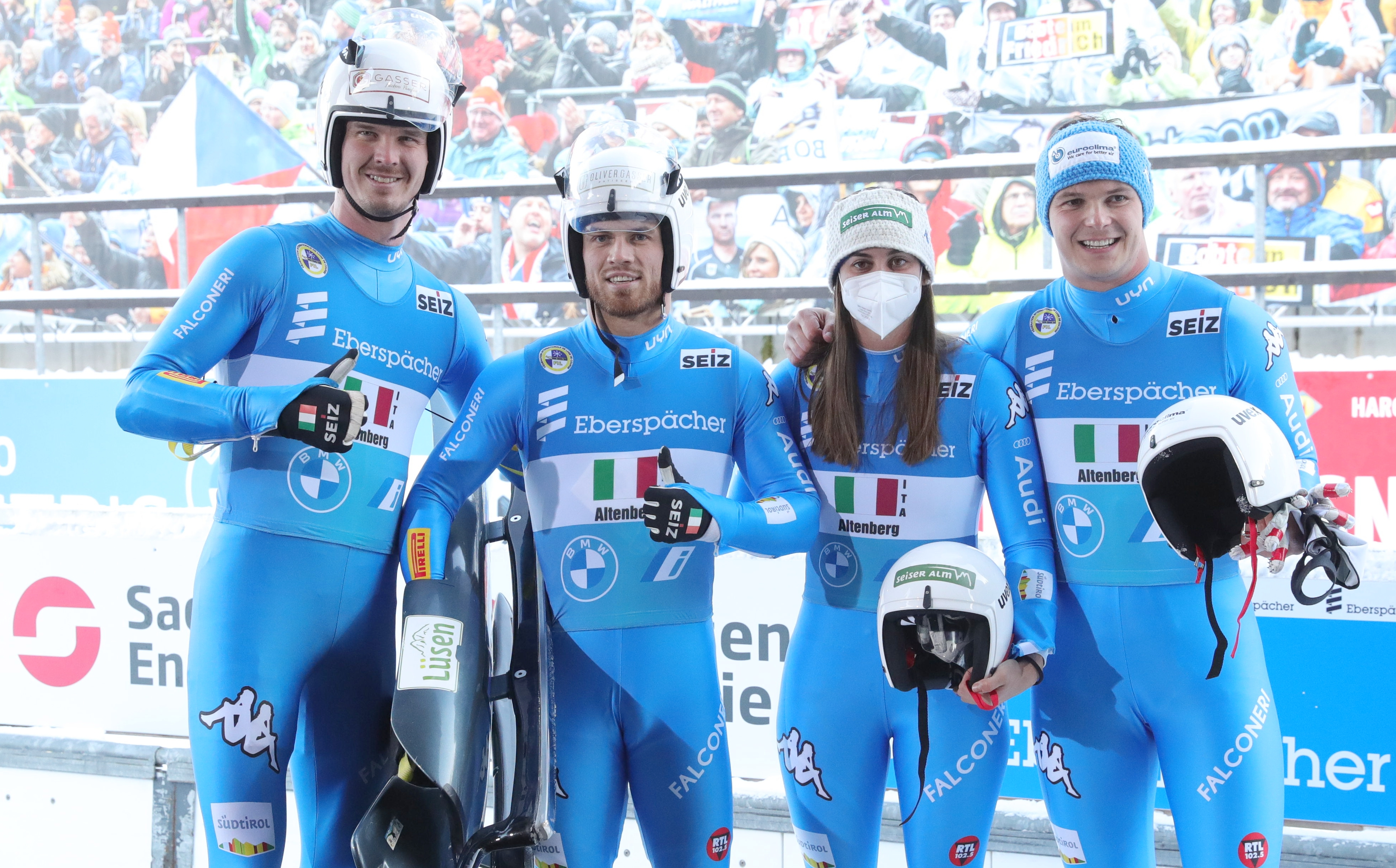
Team Relay World Cup at 2021-22 Altenberg Luge World Cup

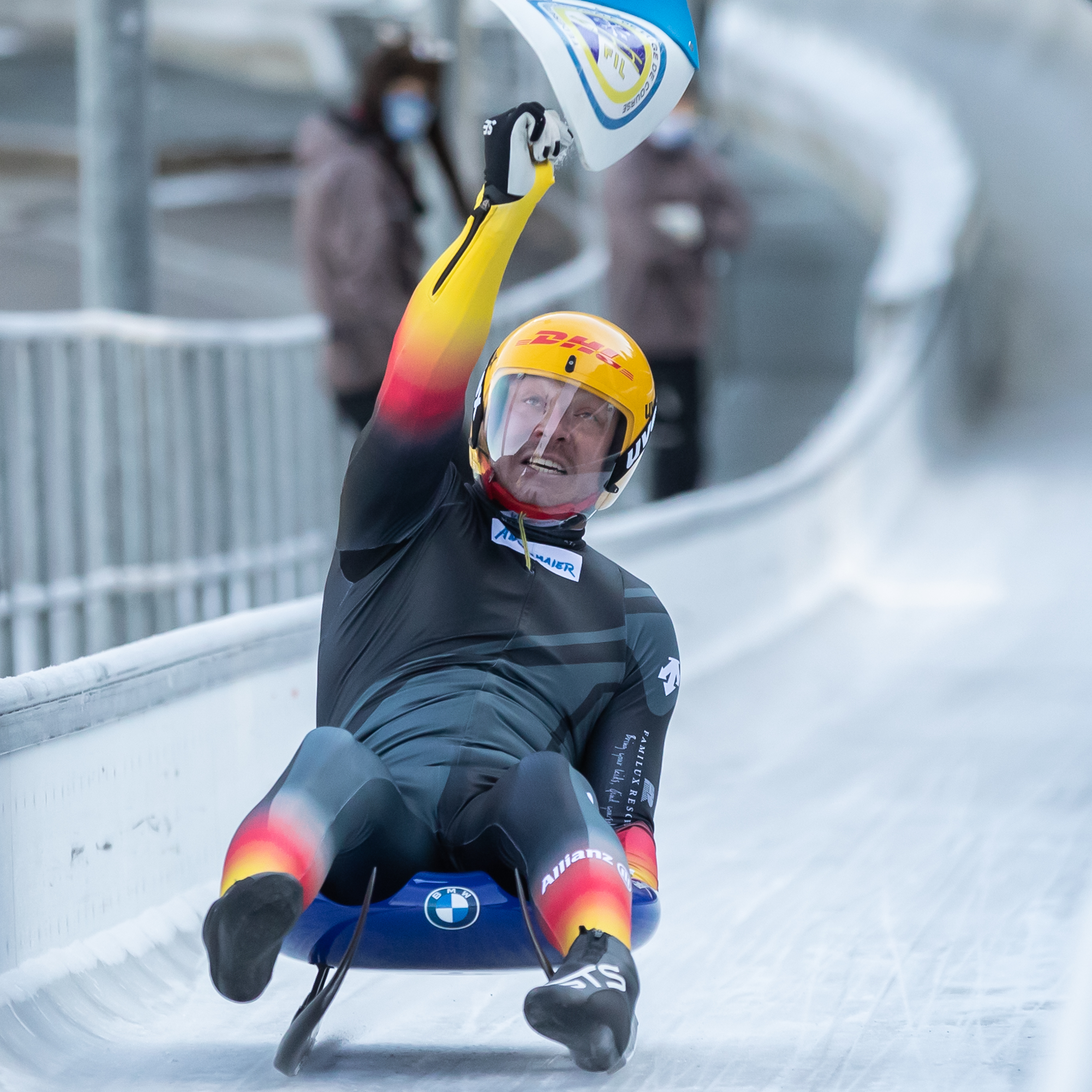
Rennrodeln, Deutsche Meisterschaften in Königssee

The 2021–22 Luge World Cup was a multi race tournament over a season for Luge, organised by the FIL. The season started on 20 November 2021 in Yanqing, China, and concluded on 23 January 2022 in St. Moritz, Switzerland.

== Calendar ==
Venue	Date	Details
(China) Yanqing	20–21 November	Team Relay
(Russia) Sochi	27–28 November (Replaced Whistler)	Team Relay
(Russia) Sochi	4–5 December (Replaced Lake Placid)	Sprint
(Germany) Altenberg	11–12 December	Team Relay
(Austria) Innsbruck	18–19 December	Sprint
(Germany) Winterberg	1–2 January	Team Relay
(Latvia) Sigulda	8–9 January	Sprint
(Germany) Oberhof	15–16 January	Team Relay
(Switzerland) St. Moritz	22–23 January	Team Relay/FIL European Championships

== Results ==
=== Men's singles ===
Event:	Gold:	Time	Silver:	Time	Bronze:	Time
Yanqing	(Germany) Johannes Ludwig	1:54.597 (57.299 / 57.298)	(Germany) Felix Loch	1:55.451 (57.869 / 57.582)	(Germany) Max Langenhan	1:55.455 (57.734 / 57.721)
Sochi 1	(Germany) Johannes Ludwig	1:44.626 (52.761 / 51.865)	(Germany) Felix Loch	1:44.784 (52.675 / 52.109)	(Russia) Roman Repilov	1:44.834 (52.813 / 52.021)
Sochi 2	(Latvia) Kristers Aparjods	1:42.881 (51.490 / 51.391)	(Germany) Johannes Ludwig	1:42.905 (51.526 / 51.379)	(Italy) Dominik Fischnaller	1:42.920 (51.461 / 51.459)
Sochi (Sprint)	(Italy) Dominik Fischnaller	34.833	(Russia) Roman Repilov	34.872	(Austria) Wolfgang Kindl	34.883
Altenberg	(Austria) Wolfgang Kindl	1:47.997 (53.900 / 54.097)	none awarded		(Germany) Johannes Ludwig	1:48.030 (53.905 / 54.125)
Altenberg	(Germany) Max Langenhan	1:47.997 (54.034 / 53.963)	none awarded		(Germany) Johannes Ludwig	1:48.030 (53.905 / 54.125)
Innsbruck	(Germany) Johannes Ludwig	1:39.605 (49.790 / 49.815)	(Austria) Wolfgang Kindl	1:39.654 (49.822 / 49.832)	(Italy) Dominik Fischnaller	1:39.880 (49.959 / 49.921)
Innsbruck (Sprint)	(Austria) Wolfgang Kindl	32.390	(Austria) Jonas Müller	32.430	(Germany) Johannes Ludwig	32.537
Winterberg	(Germany) Johannes Ludwig	1:44.679 (52.349 / 52.330)	(Austria) Nico Gleirscher	1:44.747 (52.121 / 52.626)	(Austria) Wolfgang Kindl	1:44.860 (52.645 / 52.215)
Sigulda	(Latvia) Kristers Aparjods	1:36.483 (48.223 / 48.260)	(Germany) Felix Loch	1:36.669 (48.271 / 48.398)	(Italy) Dominik Fischnaller	1:36.684 (48.271 / 48.413)
Sigulda (Sprint)	(Germany) Felix Loch	27.819	(Latvia) Kristers Aparjods	27.833	(Italy) Dominik Fischnaller	27.890
Oberhof	(Germany) Johannes Ludwig	1:25.069 (42.554 / 42.515)	(Germany) Max Langenhan	1:25.373 (42.714 / 42.659)	(Germany) Felix Loch	1:25.385 (42.721 / 42.664)
St. Moritz	(Austria) Wolfgang Kindl	2:10.246 (1:05.162 / 1:05.084)	(Latvia) Kristers Aparjods	2:10.267 (1:05.182 / 1:05.085)	(Austria) Nico Gleirscher	2:10.546 (1:05.365 / 1:05.181)

=== Women's singles ===
Event:	Gold:	Time	Silver:	Time	Bronze:	Time
Yanqing	(Austria) Madeleine Egle	1:58.822 (59.390 / 59.432)	(Germany) Julia Taubitz	1:58.928 (59.397 / 59.531)	(Austria) Lisa Schulte	1:59.350 (59.793 / 59.557)
Sochi 1	(Germany) Anna Berreiter	1:40.649 (50.173 / 50.476)	(Latvia) Kendija Aparjode	1:40.756 (50.334 / 50.422)	(Russia) Victoria Demchenko	1:40.917 (50.330 / 50.587)
Sochi 2	(Germany) Julia Taubitz	1:39.434 (49.677 / 49.757)	(Germany) Natalie Geisenberger	1:39.802 (49.819 / 49.983)	(Latvia) Kendija Aparjode	1:39.856 (49.946 / 49.910)
Sochi (Sprint)	(Germany) Julia Taubitz	31.743	(United States) Summer Britcher	31.764	(Germany) Dajana Eitberger	31.775
Altenberg	(Austria) Madeleine Egle	1:45.208 (52.693 / 52.515)	(Germany) Julia Taubitz	1:45.501 (52.836 / 52.665)	(Germany) Anna Berreiter	1:45.793 (52.889 / 52.904)
Innsbruck	(Germany) Julia Taubitz	1:19.546 (39.845 / 39.701)	(Austria) Madeleine Egle	1:19.558 (39.809 / 39.749)	(Germany) Natalie Geisenberger	1:19.894 (39.950 / 39.944)
Innsbruck (Sprint)	(Austria) Madeleine Egle	29.992	(Germany) Julia Taubitz	30.042	(Germany) Anna Berreiter	30.115
Winterberg	(Germany) Julia Taubitz	1:53.167 (57.019 / 56.148)	(Germany) Natalie Geisenberger	1:53.408 (56.936 / 56.472)	(Austria) Madeleine Egle	1:53.423 (57.318 / 56.105)
Sigulda	(Austria) Madeleine Egle	1:24.192 (42.087 / 42.105)	(Germany) Julia Taubitz	1:24.372 (42.128 / 42.244)	(Russia) Tatiana Ivanova	1:24.410 (42.168 / 42.242)
Sigulda (Sprint)	(Russia) Tatiana Ivanova	31.241	(Germany) Natalie Geisenberger	31.255	(Austria) Madeleine Egle	31.272
Oberhof	(Austria) Madeleine Egle	1:24.074 (41.994 / 42.080)	(Germany) Julia Taubitz	1:24.094 (42.110 / 41.984)	(Germany) Anna Berreiter	1:24.339 (42.208 / 42.131)
St. Moritz	(Germany) Natalie Geisenberger	1:48.190 (54.131 / 54.059)	(Austria) Madeleine Egle	1:48.345 (54.376 / 53.969)	(Latvia) Elīna leva Vītola	1:48.456 (54.300 / 54.156)

=== Doubles ===
Event:	Gold:	Time	Silver:	Time	Bronze:	Time
Yanqing	Toni Eggert; Sascha Benecken; Germany	1:57.610 (58.793 / 58.817)	Thomas Steu; Lorenz Koller; Austria	1:57.819 (58.879 / 58.940)	Andris Šics; Juris Šics; Latvia	1:58.039 (58.991 / 59.048)
Sochi 1	Andris Šics; Juris Šics; Latvia	1:39.783 (49.726 / 50.057)	Andrey Bogdanov; Yuri Prokhorov; Russia	1:39.903 (49.660 / 50.243)	Tobias Wendl; Tobias Arlt; Germany	1:40.012 (49.854 / 50.158)
Sochi 2	Andrey Bogdanov; Yuri Prokhorov; Russia	1:39.351 (49.642 / 49.709)	Toni Eggert; Sascha Benecken; Germany	1:39.485 (49.769 / 49.716)	Andris Šics; Juris Šics; Latvia	1:39.530 (49.782 / 49.748)
Sochi (Sprint)	Andris Šics; Juris Šics; Latvia	31.385	Alexander Denisyev; Vladislav Antonov; Russia	31.423	Robin Johannes Geueke; David Gamm; Germany	31.453
Altenberg	Thomas Steu; Lorenz Koller; Austria	1:23.767 (41.911 / 41.856)	Toni Eggert; Sascha Benecken; Germany	1:23.770 (41.883 / 41.887)	Mārtiņš Bots; Roberts Plūme; Latvia	1:23.980 (41.924 / 42.056)
Innsbruck	Thomas Steu; Lorenz Koller; Austria	1:19.281 (39.649 / 39.632)	Andris Šics; Juris Šics; Latvia	1:19.303 (39.648 / 39.655)	Emanuel Rieder; Simon Kainzwaldner; Italy	1:19.452 (39.697 / 39.755)
Innsbruck (Sprint)	Toni Eggert; Sascha Benecken; Germany	29.905	Andris Šics; Juris Šics; Latvia	29.960	Thomas Steu; Lorenz Koller; Austria	29.970
Winterberg	Tobias Wendl; Tobias Arlt; Germany	1:27.184 (43.667 / 43.517)	Thomas Steu; Lorenz Koller; Austria	1:27.225 (43.708 / 43.517)	Yannick Müller; Armin Frauscher; Austria	1:27.338 (43.769 / 43.569)
Sigulda	Toni Eggert; Sascha Benecken; Germany	1:23.856 (41.916 / 41.940)	Andris Šics; Juris Šics; Latvia	1:23.893 (41.924 / 41.969)	Tobias Wendl; Tobias Arlt; Germany	1:24.049 (42.055 / 41.994)
Sigulda (Sprint)	Andris Šics; Juris Šics; Latvia	31.157	Toni Eggert; Sascha Benecken; Germany	31.178	Tobias Wendl; Tobias Arlt; Germany	31.226
Oberhof	Toni Eggert; Sascha Benecken; Germany	1:22.651 (41.331 / 41.320)	Tobias Wendl; Tobias Arlt; Germany	1:22.967 (41.491 / 41.476)	Emanuel Rieder; Simon Kainzwaldner; Italy	1:23.102 (41.554 / 41.548)
St. Moritz	Toni Eggert; Sascha Benecken; Germany	1:47.209 (53.585 / 53.624)	Tobias Wendl; Tobias Arlt; Germany	1:47.322 (53.652 / 53.670)	Mārtiņš Bots; Roberts Plūme; Latvia	1:47.458 (53.806 / 53.652)

=== Team relay ===
Event:	Gold:	Time	Silver:	Time	Bronze:	Time
Yanqing	Austria; Madeleine Egle; David Gleirscher; Thomas Steu/Lorenz Koller	3:06.953 (1:01.303 / 2:04.295)	United States; Ashley Farquharson; Tucker West; Chris Mazdzer/Jayson Terdiman	3:07.328 (1:00.907 / 2:03.771)	Italy; Verena Hofer; Dominik Fischnaller; Emanuel Rieder/Simon Kainzwaldner	3:07.331 (1:01.547 / 2:04.124)
Sochi	Russia; Victoria Demchenko; Semen Pavlichenko; Andrey Bogdanov/Yuri Prokhorov	2:45.808 (53.964 / 1:49.836)	Germany; Anna Berreiter; Johannes Ludwig; Tobias Wendl/Tobias Arlt	2:47.100 (54.182 / 1:50.156)	Latvia; Kendija Aparjode; Kristers Aparjods; Andris Šics/Juris Šics	2:47.480 (54.522 / 1:50.958)
Altenberg	Germany; Julia Taubitz; Max Langenhan; Toni Eggert/Sascha Benecken	2:23.954 (47.000 / 1:35.372)	Italy; Andrea Vötter; Dominik Fischnaller; Ludwig Rieder/Patrick Rastner	2:24.279 (47.271 / 1:35.650)	Russia; Ekaterina Katnikova; Aleksandr Gorbatcevich; Alexander Denisyev/Vladislav Antonov	2:24.447 (47.058 / 1:35.585)
Winterberg	Latvia; Elīza Tīruma; Kristers Aparjods; Mārtiņš Bots/Roberts Plūme	2:24.294 (47.179 / 1:35.354)	Austria; Madeleine Egle; Nico Gleirscher; Thomas Steu/Lorenz Koller	2:24.652 (47.317 / 1:35.824)	United States; Summer Britcher; Tucker West; Chris Mazdzer/Jayson Terdiman	2:24.802 (47.312 / 1:35.954)
Oberhof	Germany; Julia Taubitz; Johannes Ludwig; Toni Eggert/Sascha Benecken	2:21.536 (46.288 / 1:33.697)	Latvia; Elīna leva Vītola; Kristers Aparjods; Andris Šics/Juris Šics	2:22.071 (46.685 / 1:34.037)	Austria; Madeleine Egle; Nico Gleirscher; Thomas Steu/Lorenz Koller	2:22.077 (46.399 / 1:33.925)
St. Moritz	Latvia; Elīna leva Vītola; Kristers Aparjods; Mārtiņš Bots/Roberts Plūme	2:47.101 (55.228 / 1:50.793)	Germany; Natalie Geisenberger; Johannes Ludwig; Toni Eggert/Sascha Benecken	2:47.228 (55.311 / 1:51.027)	Russia; Tatiana Ivanova; Roman Repilov; Andrey Bogdanov/Yuri Prokhorov	2:47.776 (55.478 / 1:51.336)

== Standings ==
=== Men's singles Overall ===
Pos.	Luger	Points
1.	Johannes Ludwig (GER)	871
2.	Wolfgang Kindl (AUT)	791
3.	Kristers Aparjods (LAT)	691
3.	Felix Loch (GER)*	691
5.	Dominik Fischnaller (ITA)	641
6.	Roman Repilov (RUS)	607
7.	Max Langenhan (GER)	599
8.	Nico Gleirscher (AUT)	559
9.	Semen Pavlichenko (RUS)	467
10.	Gints Bērziņš (LAT)	450

- Final standings after 12 events
- (*Champion 2021)

=== Men's singles ===
Pos.	Luger	Points
1.	Johannes Ludwig (GER)	719
2.	Wolfgang Kindl (AUT)	575
3.	Felix Loch (GER)*	545
4.	Kristers Aparjods (LAT)	536
5.	Max Langenhan (GER)	497
6.	Roman Repilov (RUS)	440
7.	Dominik Fischnaller (ITA)	439
8.	Nico Gleirscher (AUT)	435
9.	Semen Pavlichenko (RUS)	352
10.	David Gleirscher (AUT)	325

- Final standings after 9 events
- (*Champion 2021)

=== Men's singles Sprint ===
Pos.	Luger	Points
1.	Wolfgang Kindl (AUT)	216
2.	Dominik Fischnaller (ITA)	202
3.	Roman Repilov (RUS)	167
4.	Kristers Aparjods (LAT)	155
5.	Johannes Ludwig (GER)	152
6.	Felix Loch (GER)*	146
7.	Gints Bērziņš (LAT)	141
8.	Aleksandr Gorbatcevich (RUS)	128
9.	Kevin Fischnaller (ITA)*	124
9.	Nico Gleirscher (AUT)	124
9.	Jonas Müller (AUT)	124

- Final standings after 3 events
- (*Champions 2021)

=== Women's singles Overall ===
Pos.	Luger	Points
1.	Julia Taubitz (GER)	979
2.	Madeleine Egle (AUT)	947
3.	Natalie Geisenberger (GER)*	772
4.	Anna Berreiter (GER)	723
5.	Elīza Tīruma (LAT)	569
6.	Victoria Demchenko (RUS)	444
7.	Andrea Vötter (ITA)	422
8.	Hannah Prock (AUT)	414
9.	Lisa Schulte (AUT)	408
10.	Ekaterina Katnikova (RUS)	369

- Final standings after 12 events
- (*Champion 2021)

=== Women's singles ===
Pos.	Luger	Points
1.	Madeleine Egle (AUT)	741
2.	Julia Taubitz (GER)	739
3.	Natalie Geisenberger (GER)*	577
4.	Anna Berreiter (GER)	562
5.	Elīza Tīruma (LAT)	435
6.	Victoria Demchenko (RUS)	350
7.	Andrea Vötter (ITA)	322
8.	Lisa Schulte (AUT)	312
9.	Hannah Prock (AUT)	294
10.	Ekaterina Katnikova (RUS)	288

- Final standings after 9 events
- (*Champion 2021)

=== Women's singles Sprint ===
Pos.	Luger	Points
1.	Julia Taubitz (GER)*	240
2.	Madeleine Egle (AUT)	206
3.	Natalie Geisenberger (GER)	195
4.	Anna Berreiter (GER)	161
5.	Elīza Tīruma (LAT)	134
6.	Hannah Prock (AUT)	120
7.	Tatiana Ivanova (RUS)	100
8.	Andrea Vötter (ITA)	100
9.	Lisa Schulte (AUT)	96
10.	Victoria Demchenko (RUS)	94

- Final standings after 3 events
- (*Champion 2021)

=== Doubles Overall ===
Pos.	Team	Points
1.	Toni Eggert / Sascha Benecken (GER)	907
2.	Andris Šics / Juris Šics (LAT)	883
3.	Tobias Wendl / Tobias Arlt (GER)	796
4.	Emanuel Rieder / Simon Kainzwaldner (ITA)	604
5.	Andrey Bogdanov / Yuri Prokhorov (RUS)	603
6.	Thomas Steu / Lorenz Koller (AUT)*	550
7.	Alexander Denisyev / Vladislav Antonov (RUS)	528
8.	Mārtiņš Bots / Roberts Plūme (LAT)	519
9.	Ludwig Rieder / Patrick Rastner (ITA)	497
10.	Yannick Müller / Armin Frauscher (AUT)	462

- Final standings after 12 events
- (*Champion 2021)

=== Doubles ===
Pos.	Team	Points
1.	Toni Eggert / Sascha Benecken (GER)	676
2.	Tobias Wendl / Tobias Arlt (GER)	624
3.	Andris Šics / Juris Šics (LAT)	598
4.	Thomas Steu / Lorenz Koller (AUT)*	480
5.	Emanuel Rieder / Simon Kainzwaldner (ITA)	463
6.	Andrey Bogdanov / Yuri Prokhorov (RUS)	453
7.	Mārtiņš Bots / Roberts Plūme (LAT)	418
8.	Alexander Denisyev / Vladislav Antonov (RUS)	377
9.	Yannick Müller / Armin Frauscher (AUT)	372
10.	Ludwig Rieder / Patrick Rastner (ITA)	364

- Final standings after 9 events
- (*Champion 2021)

=== Doubles Sprint ===
Pos.	Team	Points
1.	Andris Šics / Juris Šics (LAT)	285
2.	Toni Eggert / Sascha Benecken (GER)	231
3.	Tobias Wendl / Tobias Arlt (GER)	172
4.	Alexander Denisyev / Vladislav Antonov (RUS)	151
5.	Andrey Bogdanov / Yuri Prokhorov (RUS)	150
6.	Emanuel Rieder / Simon Kainzwaldner (ITA)	141
7.	Ludwig Rieder / Patrick Rastner (ITA)	133
8.	Mārtiņš Bots / Roberts Plūme (LAT)	101
9.	Robin Johannes Geueke / David Gamm (GER)	98
10.	Ivan Nagler / Fabian Malleier (ITA)	96

- Final standings after 3 events

=== Team Relay ===
Pos.	Luger	Points
1.	Germany*	476
2.	Latvia	415
3.	Austria	360
4.	Russia	345
5.	Italy	330
6.	United States	257
7.	Canada	248
8.	Poland	216
9.	Slovakia	210
10.	Czech Republic	190

- Final standings after 6 events
- (*Champion 2021)

== Medal table ==
Rank	Nation	Gold	Silver	Bronze	Total
1	Germany	21	20	13	54
2	Austria	11	8	9	28
3	Latvia	7	7	7	21
4	Russia	3	3	5	11
5	Italy	1	1	7	9
6	United States	0	2	1	3
Totals (6 entries)		43	41	42	126

== Points ==
Place	1	2	3	4	5	6	7	8	9	10	11	12	13	14	15	16	17	18	19	20
Individual	100	85	70	60	55	50	46	42	39	36	34	32	30	28	26	25	24	23	22	21
