= 2020 FIL European Luge Championships – Team relay =

Team relay at the 2020 FIL European Luge Championships
- Venue: Lillehammer Olympic Bobsleigh and Luge Track
- Location: Lillehammer, Norway
- Dates: 19 January
- Competitors: 36 from 9 nations
- Winning time: 2:36.912

Medalists
gold medal	Madeleine Egle; David Gleirscher; Thomas Steu; Lorenz Koller	Austria
silver medal	Andrea Vötter; Dominik Fischnaller; Ivan Nagler; Fabian Malleier	Italy
bronze medal	Ulla Zirne; Kristers Aparjods; Andris Šics; Juris Šics	Latvia

The team relay competition at the 2020 FIL European Luge Championships was held on 19 January 2020.

== Results ==
The event was started at 13:00.

Rank	Bib	Athlete	Country	Women's singles	Men's singles	Doubles	Total	Behind
1st place, gold medalist(s)	8–1; 8-2; 8-3	Madeleine Egle; David Gleirscher; Thomas Steu / Lorenz Koller	Austria	51.218	52.658	53.036	2:36.912 TR	
2nd place, silver medalist(s)	11–1; 11-2; 11-3	Andrea Vötter; Dominik Fischnaller; Ivan Nagler / Fabian Malleier	Italy	51.289	52.648	53.083	2:37.020	+ 0.108
3rd place, bronze medalist(s)	7–1; 7-2; 7-3	Ulla Zirne; Kristers Aparjods; Andris Šics / Juris Šics	Latvia	51.309	52.749	53.485	2:37.543	+ 0.631
4	10–1; 10-2; 10-3	Julia Taubitz; Johannes Ludwig; Tobias Wendl / Tobias Arlt	Germany	51.485	52.975	53.109	2:37.569	+ 0.657
5	9–1; 9-2; 9-3	Tatiana Ivanova; Semen Pavlichenko; Aleksandr Denisev / Vladislav Antonov	Russia	52.385	52.524	53.314	2:38.223	+ 1.311
6	6–1; 6-2; 6-3	Katarína Šimoňáková; Jozef Ninis; Tomáš Vaverčák / Matej Zmij	Slovakia	51.912	53.226	54.482	2:39.620	+ 2.708
7	3 -1; 3-2; 3-3	Klaudia Domaradzka; Mateusz Sochowicz; Wojciech Chmielewski / Jakub Kowalewski	Poland	52.127	53.496	54.299	2:39.922	+ 3.010
8	5–1; 5-2; 5-3	Olena Stetskiv; Anton Dukach; Ihor Stakhiv / Andriy Lysetskyy	Ukraine	53.020	53.335	54.753	2:41.108	+ 4.196
9	4–1; 4-2; 4-3	Michaela Maršíková; Jan Čežík; Filip Vejdělek / Zdeněk Pěkný	Czech Republic	52.403	55.297	54.841	2:42.541	+ 5.629
