= Luge at the 2022 Winter Olympics – Team relay =

Luge team relay at the XXIV Olympic Winter Games
- Luge pictogram
- Venue: Xiaohaituo Bobsleigh and Luge Track
- Date: 10 February 2022
- Competitors: 56 from 14 nations
- Teams: 14
- Winning time: 3:03.406

Medalists
1st place, gold medalist(s)		Natalie Geisenberger; Johannes Ludwig; Tobias Wendl / Tobias Arlt	Germany
2nd place, silver medalist(s)		Madeleine Egle; Wolfgang Kindl; Thomas Steu / Lorenz Koller	Austria
3rd place, bronze medalist(s)		Elīza Tīruma; Kristers Aparjods; Mārtiņš Bots / Roberts Plūme	Latvia

The team relay competition in luge at the 2022 Winter Olympics was held on 10 February, at the Xiaohaituo Bobsleigh and Luge Track in Yanqing District of China's municipality of Beijing. The event was won by Natalie Geisenberger, Johannes Ludwig, Tobias Wendl / Tobias Arlt. All these athletes had previously won gold in their corresponding events. In particular, for Geisenberger this was the sixth gold Olympic medal, more than any other luger had ever won. Austria, with Madeleine Egle, Wolfgang Kindl, and Thomas Steu / Lorenz Koller, won silver, and Latvia, with Elīza Tīruma, Kristers Aparjods, and Mārtiņš Bots / Roberts Plūme, bronze.

Germany won both previous mixed team relays, at the 2014 and 2018 Olympics, and were leading the 2021–22 Luge World Cup before the Olympics. Latvia were second, and Austria third. In 2018, Canada were second and Austria third, however, after the retirements of Alex Gough and Samuel Edney, Canada were not performing well in the 2021–22 Luge World Cup and were not considered a medal contender.

Canada, starting at number 8, set the track record, to be overtaken by the Russian Olympic Committee, who started at number 8, with four teams to go. Italy could not set the new track record, but Latvia did, taking the lead and ensuring a medal. So did Austria. Germany, a clear favorite, were still losing to the Austrians after the second leg, but Wendl and Arlt were faster and brought the team to the gold medals.

== Qualification ==
All countries qualifying a sled in each of the three individual/doubles events qualified to compete in the relay.

On December 17, 2021, the International Luge Federation announced that the qualification system was changed. The qualification system was changed due to training runs being cancelled at the first World Cup, and equipment not being delivered to the following World Cups. The new system will see athletes qualify based on their top four results during the World Cup season, (as opposed to the previous all seven results counting).

On January 19, 2022 the International Luge Federation announced the list of qualified athletes.

== Results ==
Rank	Bib	Country	Women's singles	Men's singles	Doubles	Total	Behind
1st place, gold medalist(s)	14	Germany; Natalie Geisenberger; Johannes Ludwig; Tobias Wendl / Tobias Arlt	1:00.090	1:01.407	1:01.909	3:03.406	—
2nd place, silver medalist(s)	13	Austria; Madeleine Egle; Wolfgang Kindl; Thomas Steu / Lorenz Koller	1:00.054	1:01.342	1:02.090	3:03.486	+0.080
3rd place, bronze medalist(s)	12	Latvia; Elīza Tīruma; Kristers Aparjods; Mārtiņš Bots / Roberts Plūme	1:00.578	1:01.451	1:02.325	3:04.354	+0.948
4	10	ROC; Tatiana Ivanova; Roman Repilov; Alexander Denisyev / Vladislav Antonov	1:00.147	1:01.757	1:02.763	3:04.667	+1.261
5	11	Italy; Andrea Vötter; Leon Felderer; Emanuel Rieder / Simon Kainzwaldner	1:00.618	1:01.960	1:02.274	3:04.852	+1.446
6	8	Canada; Trinity Ellis; Reid Watts; Tristan Walker / Justin Snith	1:00.880	1:02.222	1:02.133	3:05.235	+1.829
7	9	United States; Ashley Farquharson; Chris Mazdzer; Zack DiGregorio / Sean Hollander	1:00.332	1:02.077	1:03.332	3:05.741	+2.335
8	6	Poland; Klaudia Domaradzka; Mateusz Sochowicz; Wojciech Chmielewski / Jakub Kowalewski	1:01.448	1:02.727	1:02.961	3:07.136	+3.730
9	2	Romania; Raluca Strămăturaru; Valentin Cretu; Vasile Gîtlan / Darius Şerban	1:01.402	1:02.743	1:03.547	3:07.692	+4.286
10	1	Czech Republic; Anna Čežíková; Michael Lejsek; Filip Vejdělek / Zdeněk Pěkný	1:01.852	1:03.545	1:04.159	3:09.556	+6.150
11	5	Ukraine; Yulianna Tunytska; Anton Dukach; Ihor Stakhiv / Andrii Lysetskyi	1:01.123	1:04.244	1:04.237	3:09.604	+6.198
12	3	China; Wang Peixuan; Fan Duoyao; Huang Yebo / Peng Junyue	1:01.947	1:03.467	1:04.768	3:10.182	+6.776
13	4	South Korea; Aileen Frisch; Lim Nam-kyu; Park Jin-yong / Cho Jung-myung	1:02.682	1:05.265	1:03.291	3:11.238	+7.832
	7	Slovakia; Katarína Šimoňáková; Jozef Ninis; Tomáš Vaverčák / Matej Zmij	1:01.579	1:02.338	DNF	DNF	
