= 2019 FIL European Luge Championships – Women's singles =

Women's singles at the 2019 FIL European Luge Championships
- Venue: Oberhof bobsleigh, luge, and skeleton track
- Location: Oberhof, Germany
- Dates: 10 February
- Competitors: 25 from 12 nations
- Winning time: 1:22.810

Medalists
gold medal	Natalie Geisenberger	Germany
silver medal	Tatjana Hüfner	Germany
bronze medal	Dajana Eitberger	Germany

The Women's singles competition at the 2019 FIL European Luge Championships was held on 10 February 2019.

== Results ==
The first run was held at 09:00 and the second run at 10:25.

Rank	Bib	Name	Country	Run 1	Rank	Run 2	Rank	Total	Diff
1st place, gold medalist(s)	27	Natalie Geisenberger	Germany	41.365	1	41.445	1	1:22.810	
2nd place, silver medalist(s)	20	Tatjana Hüfner	Germany	41.462	3	41.571	5	1:23.033	+0.223
3rd place, bronze medalist(s)	18	Dajana Eitberger	Germany	41.455	2	41.455	9	1:23.127	+0.317
4	25	Andrea Vötter	Italy	41.651	5	41.519	3	1:23.170	+0.360
5	26	Julia Taubitz	Germany	41.706	8	41.480	2	1:23.186	+0.376
6	22	Tatiana Ivanova	Russia	41.665	6	41.702	11	1:23.367	+0.557
7	16	Ekaterina Baturina	Russia	41.804	13	41.584	6	1:23.388	+0.578
8	14	Natalie Maag	Switzerland	41.688	7	41.708	12	1:23.396	+0.586
9	21	Ulla Zirne	Latvia	41.717	10	41.695	10	1:23.412	+0.602
10	17	Madeleine Egle	Austria	41.897	15	41.519	3	1:23.416	+0.606
11	23	Elīza Cauce	Latvia	41.649	4	41.771	15	1:23.420	+0.610
12	13	Viktoriia Demchenko	Russia	41.707	9	41.730	13	1:23.437	+0.627
13	12	Raluca Strămăturaru	Romania	41.820	14	41.643	7	1:23.463	+0.653
14	28	Sandra Robatscher	Italy	41.726	11	41.793	16	1:23.519	+0.709
15	19	Kendija Aparjode	Latvia	41.785	12	41.738	14	1:23.523	+0.713
16	15	Ekaterina Katnikova	Russia	42.142	18	41.647	8	1:23.789	+0.979
17	10	Ewa Kuls-Kusyk	Poland	41.996	17	42.008	18	1:24.004	+1.194
18	9	Katarína Šimoňáková	Slovakia	42.212	19	41.981	17	1:24.193	+1.383
19	11	Olena Stetskiv	Ukraine	41.917	16	42.546	20	1:24.463	+1.653
20	5	Mihaela Manolescu	Romania	42.531	20	42.395	19	1:24.926	+2.116
21	3	Daria Obratov	Netherlands	43.236	23	42.826	22	1:26.062	+3.252
22	2	Dania Obratov	Netherlands	43.211	22	43.112	23	1:26.323	+3.513
23	4	Danielle Scott	Great Britain	45.036	24	42.795	21	1:27.831	+5.021
24	1	Elsa Desmond	Great Britain	42.911	21	45.681	24	1:28.592	+5.782
—	8	Klaudia Domaradzka	Poland	Did not finish					
