= Luge at the 2022 Winter Olympics =

Luge at the XXIV Olympic Winter Games
- Luge pictogram
- Venue: Xiaohaituo Bobsleigh and Luge Track
- Dates: 5–10 February 2022
- No. of events: 4 (1 men, 1 open, 1 women, 1 mixed)
- Competitors: 106 from 26 nations (71 men and 35 women)

Luge at the 2022 Winter Olympics was held at the Xiaohaituo Bobsleigh and Luge Track which is one of the Yanqing cluster venues between 5 and 10 February 2022.

A total of 106 quota spots were distributed to the sport of luge, a decline of four from the 2018 Winter Olympics. A total of four events were contested, one for men, one open event, one for women and one mixed.

== Qualification ==
A maximum of 106 athletes were allowed to compete at the Games. Countries were assigned quotas using the results of Olympic Qualification World Cup Ranking List from 1 July 2020 to 31 December 2021.

== Competition schedule ==
The following is the competition schedule for all four events.

All times are in local time (UTC+8), according to the official schedule correct as of March 2021. This schedule may be subject to change in due time.

Date	Time	Event
5 February	19:10	Men's singles - Heats 1 and 2
6 February	19:30	Men's singles - Heats 3 and 4
7 February	19:50	Women's singles - Heats 1 and 2
8 February	19:50	Women's singles - Heats 3 and 4
9 February	20:20	Doubles
10 February	21:30	Team relay

== Medal summary ==
Germany dominated the luge competitions, sweeping all four gold medals, and earning six overall.

=== Medal table ===
Rank	Nation	Gold	Silver	Bronze	Total
1	Germany	4	2	0	6
2	Austria	0	2	1	3
3	Italy	0	0	1	1
3	Latvia	0	0	1	1
3	ROC	0	0	1	1
Totals (5 entries)		4	4	4	12

=== Events ===
Event	Gold		Silver		Bronze	
Men's singles	Johannes Ludwig; Germany	3:48.735	Wolfgang Kindl; Austria	3:48.895	Dominik Fischnaller; Italy	3:49.686
Women's singles	Natalie Geisenberger; Germany	3:53.454	Anna Berreiter; Germany	3:53.947	Tatiana Ivanova; ROC	3:54.507
Doubles	Germany; Tobias Wendl; Tobias Arlt	1:56.554	Germany; Toni Eggert; Sascha Benecken	1:56.653	Austria; Thomas Steu; Lorenz Koller	1:57.065
Team relay	Germany; Natalie Geisenberger; Johannes Ludwig; Tobias Wendl; Tobias Arlt	3:03.406	Austria; Madeleine Egle; Wolfgang Kindl; Thomas Steu; Lorenz Koller	3:03.486	Latvia; Elīza Tīruma; Kristers Aparjods; Mārtiņš Bots; Roberts Plūme	3:04.354

== Participating nations ==
A total of 110 athletes from 26 nations (including the IOC's designation of ROC for the Russian Olympic Committee) qualified to participate. Ireland made its Olympic sport debut.

The numbers in parentheses represents the number of participants entered.

- Argentina (1)
- Australia (1)
- Austria (10)
- Bosnia and Herzegovina (1)
- Bulgaria (1)
- Canada (6)
- China (4)
- Czech Republic (4)
- Georgia (1)
- Germany (10)
- Great Britain (1)
- Ireland (1)
- Italy (8)
- Japan (1)
- Latvia (10)
- Moldova (1)
- Poland (4)
- Romania (4)
- ROC (10)
- Slovakia (5)
- South Korea (5)
- Sweden (2)
- Switzerland (1)
- Chinese Taipei (1)
- Ukraine (6)
- United States (8)
