= 2021 FIL World Luge Championships – Team relay =

Team relay at the 2021 FIL World Luge Championships
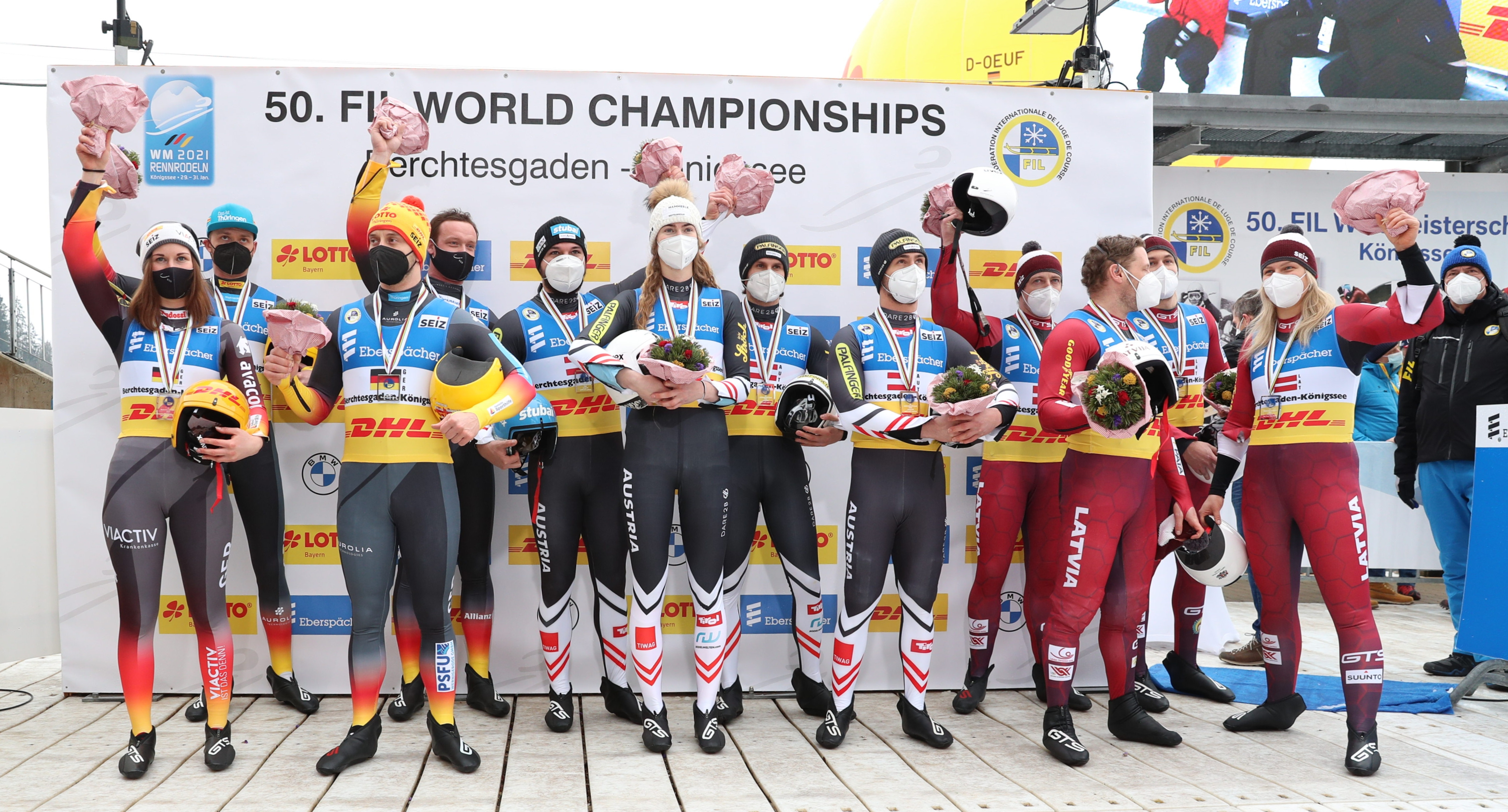
- Team Relay at the FIL World Luge Championships Königssee 2021 by Sandro Halank
- Venue: Königssee bobsleigh, luge, and skeleton track
- Location: Königssee, Germany
- Dates: 31 January
- Competitors: 44 from 11 nations
- Teams: 11
- Winning time: 2:43.139

Medalists
| gold medal | Madeleine Egle; David Gleirscher; Thomas Steu; Lorenz Koller | Austria |
| silver medal | Julia Taubitz; Felix Loch; Toni Eggert; Sascha Benecken | Germany |
| bronze medal | Kendija Aparjode; Artūrs Dārznieks; Andris Šics; Juris Šics | Latvia |

The Team relay competition at the 2021 FIL World Luge Championships was held on 31 January 2021.

== Results ==
The race was started at 13:30.

| Rank | Bib | Country | Total | Diff |
|---|---|---|---|---|
| 1st place, gold medalist(s) | 9 | Austria; Madeleine Egle; David Gleirscher; Thomas Steu / Lorenz Koller | 2:43.139 | |
| 2nd place, silver medalist(s) | 11 | Germany; Julia Taubitz; Felix Loch; Toni Eggert / Sascha Benecken | 2:43.177 | +0.038 |
| 3rd place, bronze medalist(s) | 8 | Latvia; Kendija Aparjode; Artūrs Dārznieks; Andris Šics / Juris Šics | 2:43.571 | +0.432 |
| 4 | 6 | United States; Summer Britcher; Tucker West; Chris Mazdzer / Jayson Terdiman | 2:43.764 | +0.625 |
| 5 | 7 | Italy; Andrea Vötter; Dominik Fischnaller; Ludwig Rieder / Patrick Rastner | 2:43.829 | +0.690 |
| 6 | 10 | Russian Luge Federation; Tatyana Ivanova; Roman Repilov; Aleksandr Denisev / Vladislav Antonov | 2:43.878 | +0.739 |
| 7 | 3 | Ukraine; Olena Stetskiv; Anton Dukach; Ihor Stakhiv / Andrii Lysetskyi | 2:46.152 | +3.013 |
| 8 | 4 | Slovakia; Katarína Šimoňáková; Jozef Ninis; Tomáš Vaverčák / Matej Zmij | 2:46.525 | +3.386 |
| 9 | 1 | Romania; Raluca Strămăturaru; Valentin Crețu; Vasile Gîtlan / Darius Şerban | 2:47.576 | +4.437 |
| | 5 | Poland; Klaudia Domaradzka; Mateusz Sochowicz; Wojciech Chmielewski / Jakub Kowalewski | Did not finish | |
| | 2 | South Korea; Aileen Frisch; Lim Nam-kyu; Park Jin-yong / Cho Jung-myung | Disqualified | |
