= Andrei Bogdanov (luger) =

Russian luger (born 1992)

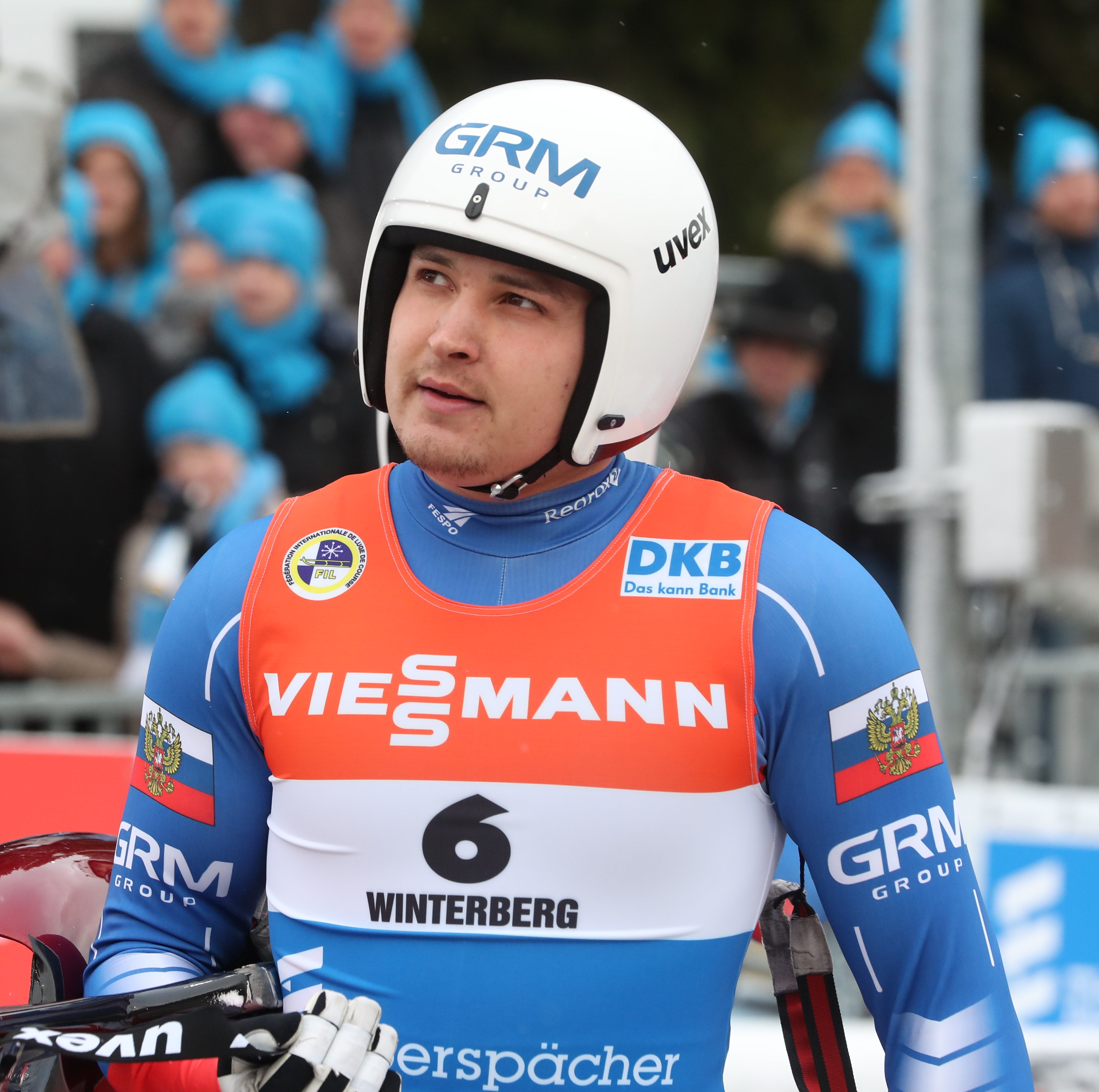
- Bogdanov in 2017

Personal information
- Full name: Andrei Igorevich Bogdanov
- Nationality: Russian
- Born: 7 October 1992 (age 33) Dmitrov, Russia

Sport
- Sport: Luge
Medal record
Men's luge
Representing Russia
World Championships
Silver medal – second place	2015 Sigulda	Team relay
European Championships
Bronze medal – third place	2022 St. Moritz	Team relay

Andrei Igorevich Bogdanov (Russian: Андрей Игоревич Богданов; born 7 October 1992) is a Russian luger. He competed in the men's doubles event at the 2018 Winter Olympics and again in the same event at the 2022 Winter Olympics.
