= Roberts Plūme (luger) =

Latvian luger (born 2000)

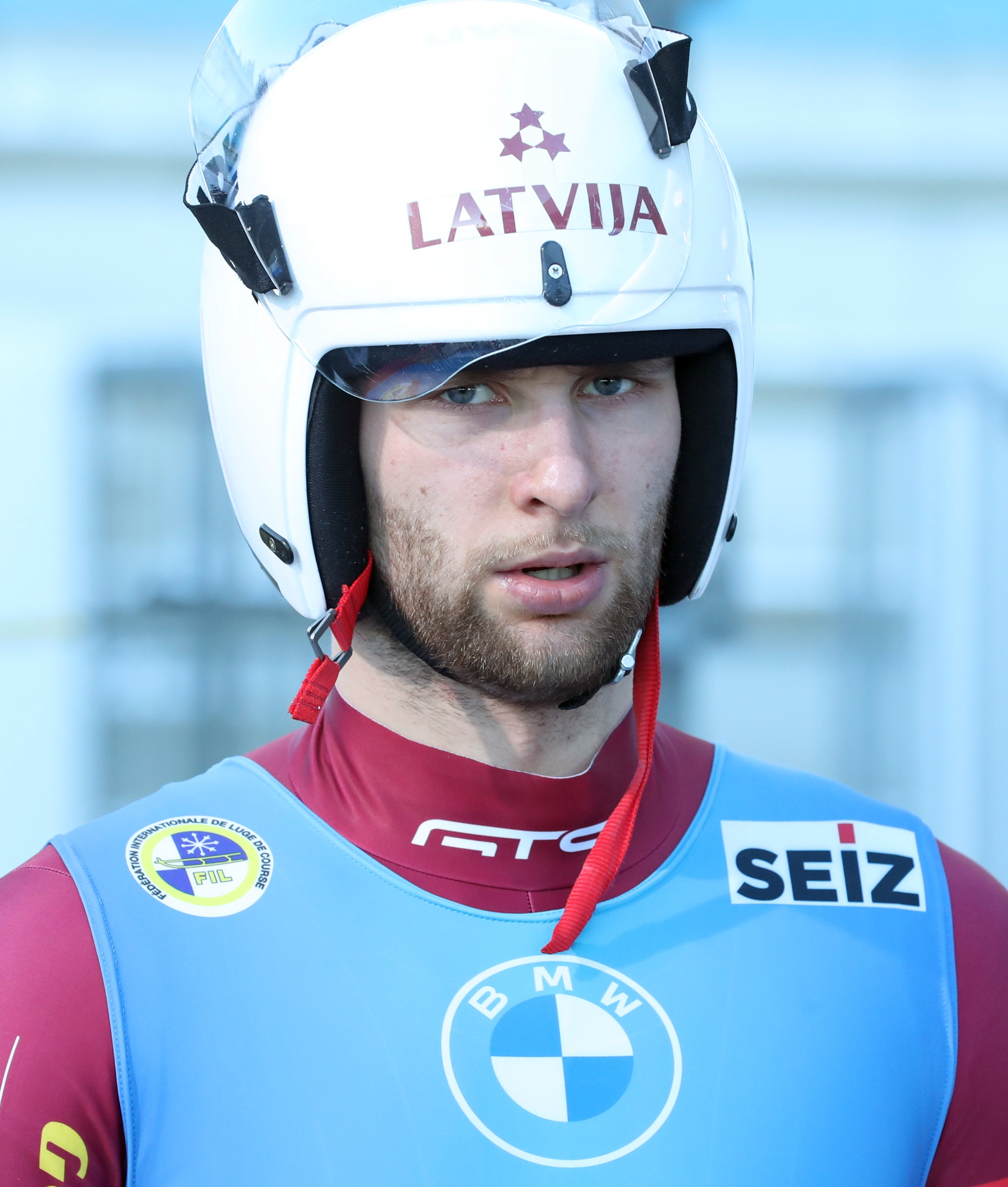
- Plūme in 2022

Personal information
- Nationality: Latvian
- Born: 6 March 2000 (age 26) Riga, Latvia
- Height: 181 cm (5 ft 11 in)

Sport
- Country: Latvia
- Sport: Luge
Medal record
Men's luge
Representing Latvia
Olympic Games
Bronze medal – third place	2022 Beijing	Team relay
World Championships
Gold medal – first place	2024 Alternberg	Sprint
Silver medal – second place	2025 Whistler	Doubles
Bronze medal – third place	2023 Oberhof	Team relay
Bronze medal – third place	2024 Altenberg	Team relay
European Championships
Gold medal – first place	2022 St. Moritz	Team relay
Gold medal – first place	2023 Sigulda	Team relay
Silver medal – second place	2023 Sigulda	Doubles
Silver medal – second place	2024 Igls	Doubles
Bronze medal – third place	2021 Sigulda	Doubles
Bronze medal – third place	2022 St. Moritz	Doubles
Bronze medal – third place	2026 Oberhof	Team relay
Bronze medal – third place	2026 Oberhof	Mixed doubles

Roberts Plūme (born 6 March 2000) is a Latvian luger.

== Career ==
He competed in the Men's Doubles and Team relay events at the 2022 Winter Olympics and won the bronze medal in the latter competition alongside his teammates Elīza Tīruma, Kristers Aparjods, and Mārtiņš Bots.

He competed at the 2024 FIL World Luge Championships and won a gold medal in the doubles sprint event and a bronze medal in the team relay.
