= Mārtiņš Bots =

Latvian luger (born 1999)

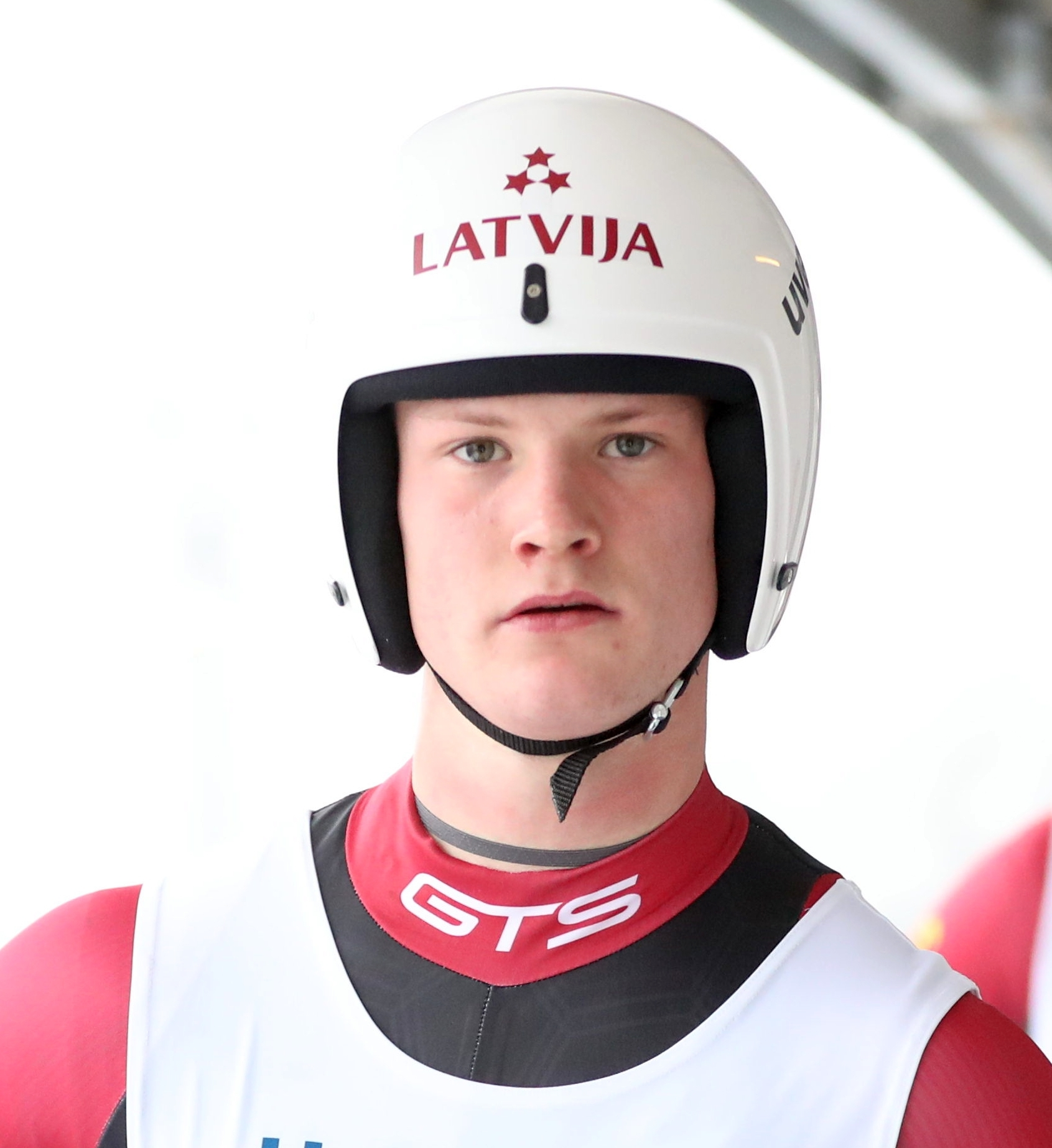
- Bots in 2020

Personal information
- Nationality: Latvian
- Born: 12 May 1999 (age 27) Sigulda, Latvia
- Height: 184 cm (6 ft 0 in)

Sport
- Sport: Luge
Medal record
Men's luge
Representing Latvia
Olympic Games
Bronze medal – third place	2022 Beijing	Team relay
World Championships
Gold medal – first place	2024 Alternberg	Sprint
Silver medal – second place	2025 Whistler	Doubles
Bronze medal – third place	2023 Oberhof	Team relay
Bronze medal – third place	2024 Altenberg	Team relay
European Championships
Gold medal – first place	2022 St. Moritz	Team relay
Gold medal – first place	2023 Sigulda	Team relay
Silver medal – second place	2023 Sigulda	Doubles
Silver medal – second place	2024 Igls	Doubles
Bronze medal – third place	2021 Sigulda	Doubles
Bronze medal – third place	2022 St. Moritz	Doubles
Bronze medal – third place	2026 Oberhof	Team relay
Bronze medal – third place	2026 Oberhof	Mixed doubles

Mārtiņš Bots (born 12 May 1999) is a Latvian luger. He represented Latvia at the 2022 Winter Olympics.

== Career ==
Bots represented Latvia at the 2022 Winter Olympics in the doubles event where he finished in fourth place with a time of 1:57.419 and won a bronze medal in the team relay.

Bots competed at the 2022 FIL European Luge Championships, winning the gold in the team relay and a bronze in the doubles event.

At the 2024 FIL World Luge Championships, he won a gold in the doubles sprint event and a bronze in the team relay.

== Personal life ==
On 5 July 2024, he married luger Elīna Ieva Vītola, who has also represented Latvia at the 2022 Winter Olympics.
