= Madeleine Egle =

Austrian luger

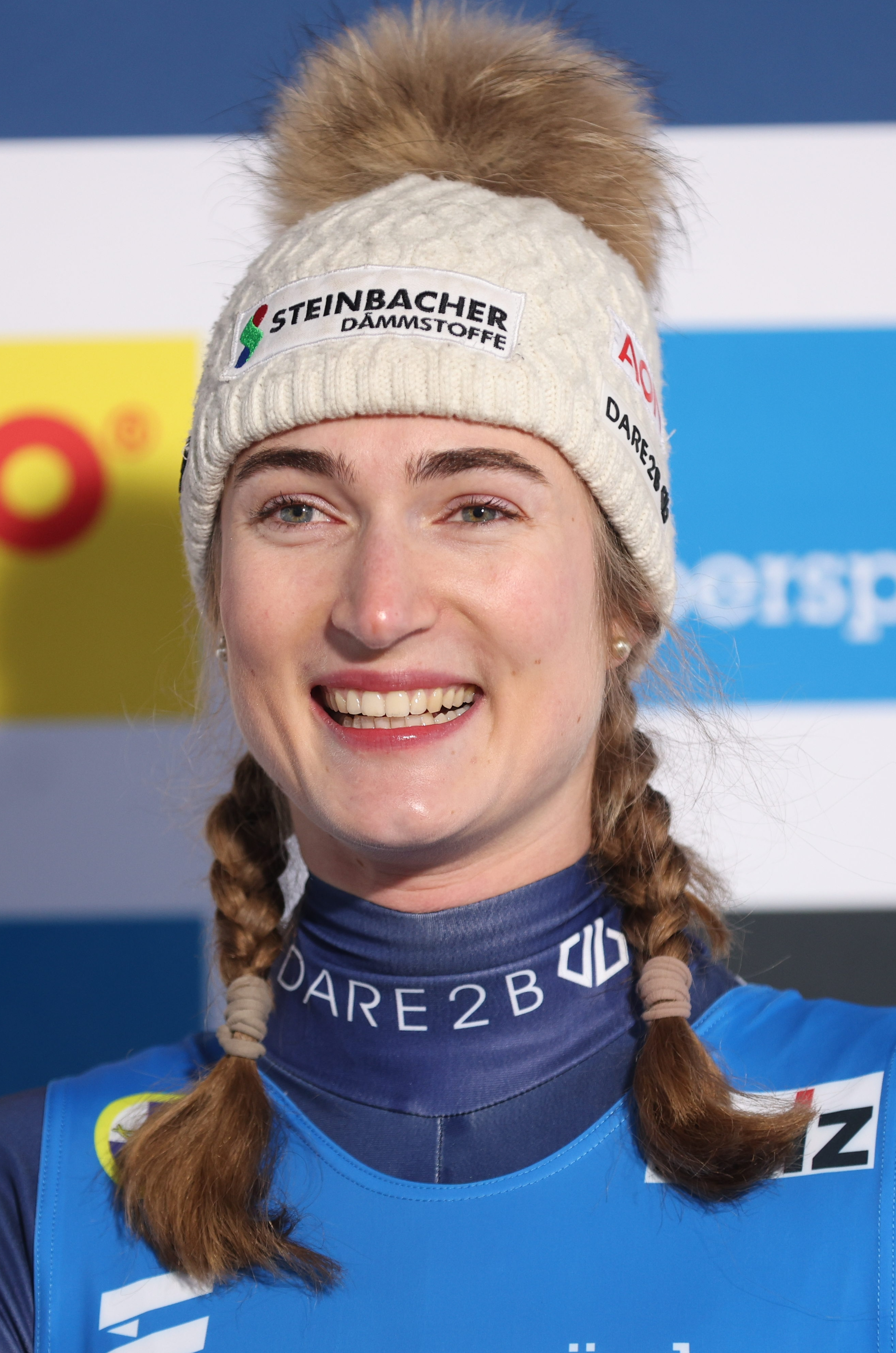
- Egle in 2024

Personal information
- Nationality: Austrian
- Born: 21 August 1998 (age 28) Rinn, Austria
- Height: 184 cm (6 ft 0 in)
- Weight: 64 kg (141 lb)

Sport
- Country: Austria
- Sport: Luge
- Event: Singles
Medal record
Women's luge
Representing Austria
Olympic Games
Silver medal – second place	2022 Beijing	Team relay
Bronze medal – third place	2018 Pyeongchang	Team relay
World Championships
Gold medal – first place	2021 Königssee	Team relay
Silver medal – second place	2023 Oberhof	Team relay
Silver medal – second place	2025 Whistler	Team relay
Bronze medal – third place	2024 Altenberg	Singles
Bronze medal – third place	2025 Whistler	Mixed singles
European Championships
Gold medal – first place	2020 Lillehammer	Team relay
Gold medal – first place	2024 Igls	Singles
Gold medal – first place	2024 Igls	Team relay
Gold medal – first place	2025 Winterberg	Team relay
Silver medal – second place	2022 St. Moritz	Singles
Silver medal – second place	2025 Winterberg	Singles
Winter Youth Olympic Games
Bronze medal – third place	2016 Lillehammer	Singles

Madeleine Egle (born 21 August 1998) is an Austrian luger. She won bronze at the 2016 Winter Youth Olympics and in 2018 another bronze medal at the 2018 Olympics in Pyeongchang.

== Career ==
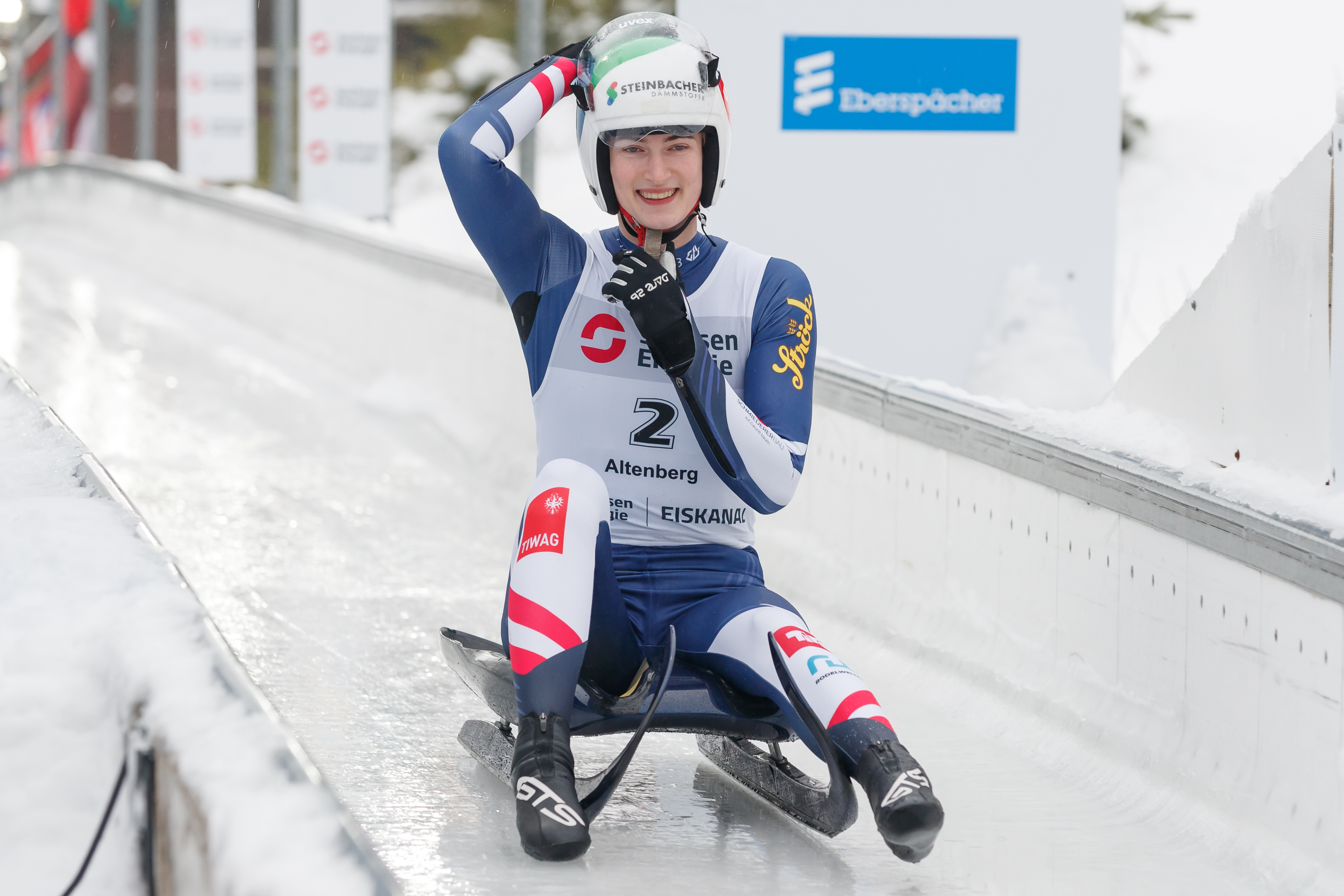
Egle in 2023

Egle turned pro in 2015 at the age of 16. She debuted at the FIL World Luge Championships during the 2015 FIL World Luge Championships. A year later she won her first career medal at the 2016 Winter Youth Olympics in Lillehammer, Norway.

She made her Olympics debut at the 2018 Winter Olympics in PyeongChang, South Korea. Egle won a bronze medal during the team relay event.

In August 2025, it was reported that Egle had been issued with a 20-month ban backdated to March 2025 for an anti-doping rule violation for whereabouts failures.

== Personal life ==
Egle's younger sister, Selina Egle, is also a luger.
