= 2022 FIL European Luge Championships =

2022 European Championships
- Venue: St. Moritz-Celerina Olympic Bobrun
- Location: St. Moritz, Switzerland
- Dates: 22–23 January

The 2022 FIL European Luge Championships were held from 22 to 23 January 2022 in St. Moritz, Switzerland.

== Schedule ==
Four events were held.

All times are local (UTC+1).

Date	Time	Events
22 January	08:40	1st run Doubles
22 January	10:05	2nd run Doubles
22 January	11:45	1st run Men
22 January	13:28	2nd run Men
23 January	09:40	1st run Women
23 January	11:10	2nd run Women
23 January	13:00	Team relay

== Medal summary ==
=== Medal table ===
Rank	Nation	Gold	Silver	Bronze	Total
1	Germany	2	2	0	4
2	Latvia	1	1	2	4
3	Austria	1	1	1	3
4	Russia	0	0	1	1
Totals (4 entries)		4	4	4	12

=== Medalists ===
Event	Gold		Silver		Bronze	
Men's singles	Wolfgang Kindl; Austria	2:10.246	Kristers Aparjods; Latvia	2:10.267	Nico Gleirscher; Austria	2:10.546
Women's singles	Natalie Geisenberger; Germany	1:48.190	Madeleine Egle; Austria	1:48.345	Elīna Ieva Vītola; Latvia	1:48.456
Doubles	Germany; Toni Eggert; Sascha Benecken	1:47.209	Germany; Tobias Wendl; Tobias Arlt	1:47.322	Latvia; Mārtiņš Bots; Roberts Plūme	1:47.458
Team relay	Latvia; Elīna Ieva Vītola; Kristers Aparjods; Mārtiņš Bots / Roberts Plūme	2:47.101	Germany; Natalie Geisenberger; Johannes Ludwig; Toni Eggert / Sascha Benecken	2:47.228	Russia; Tatiana Ivanova; Roman Repilov; Andrei Bogdanov / Yuri Prokhorov	2:47.776
