= Lorenz Koller =

Austrian luger (born 1994)

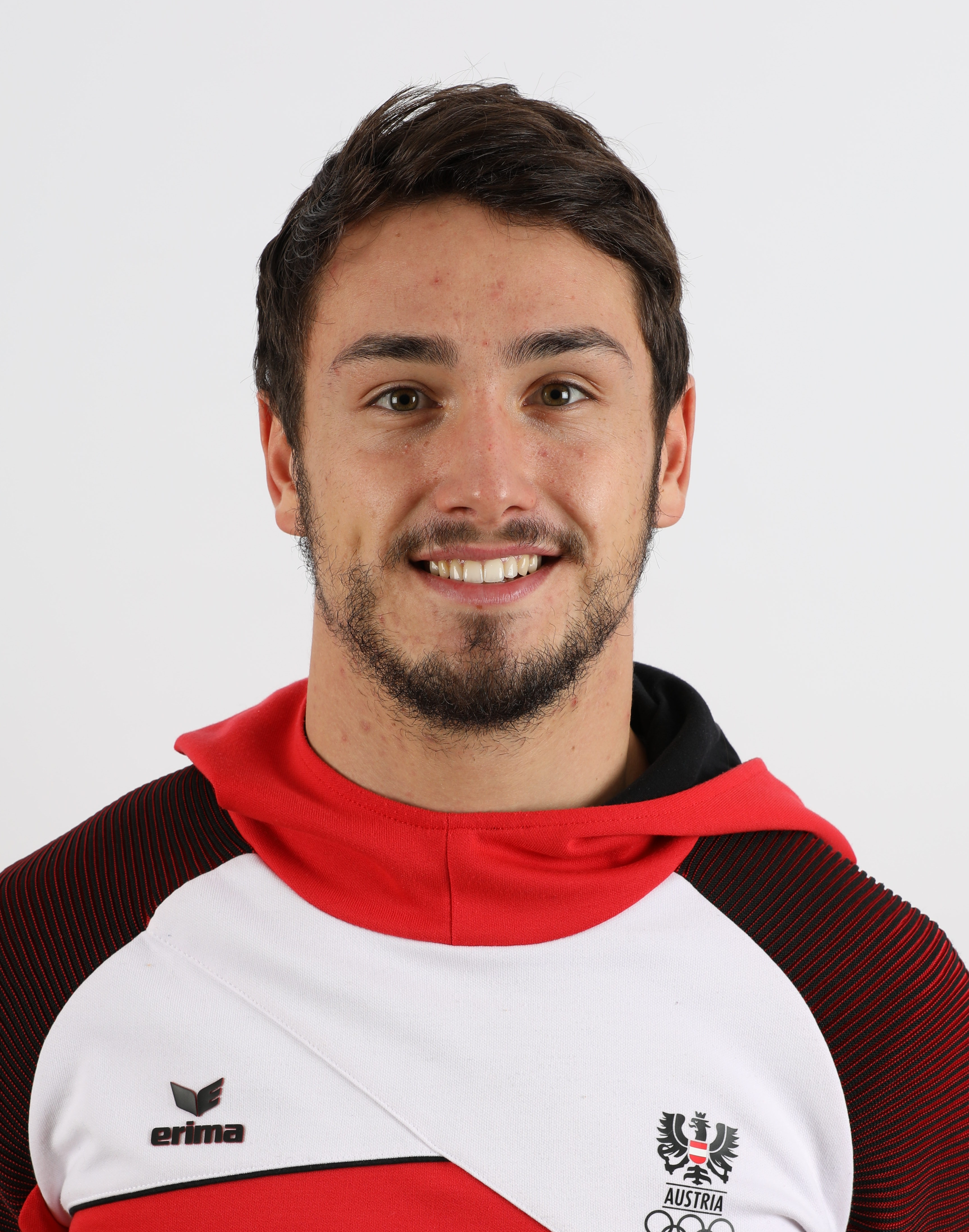
- Koller in 2018

Personal information
- Born: 26 September 1994 (age 31) Innsbruck, Austria
- Height: 1.74 m (5 ft 9 in)
- Weight: 68 kg (150 lb)

Sport
- Country: Austria
- Sport: Luge
- Event: Doubles
Medal record
Men's luge
Representing Austria
Olympic Games
Silver medal – second place	2022 Beijing	Team relay
Bronze medal – third place	2022 Beijing	Doubles
World Championships
Gold medal – first place	2021 Königssee	Team relay
Silver medal – second place	2019 Winterberg	Team relay
Bronze medal – third place	2019 Winterberg	Doubles
Bronze medal – third place	2019 Winterberg	Sprint
European Championships
Gold medal – first place	2020 Lillehammer	Team relay
Silver medal – second place	2017 Königssee	Team relay
Silver medal – second place	2020 Lillehammer	Doubles

Lorenz Koller (born 26 September 1994) is an Austrian luger. At the 2022 Winter Olympics, he won a bronze medal in the doubles event with Thomas Steu and a silver medal in the team relay event.

Koller finished fourth in the doubles event with Thomas Steu at the 2018 Winter Olympics.
