= Thomas Steu =

Austrian luger (born 1994)

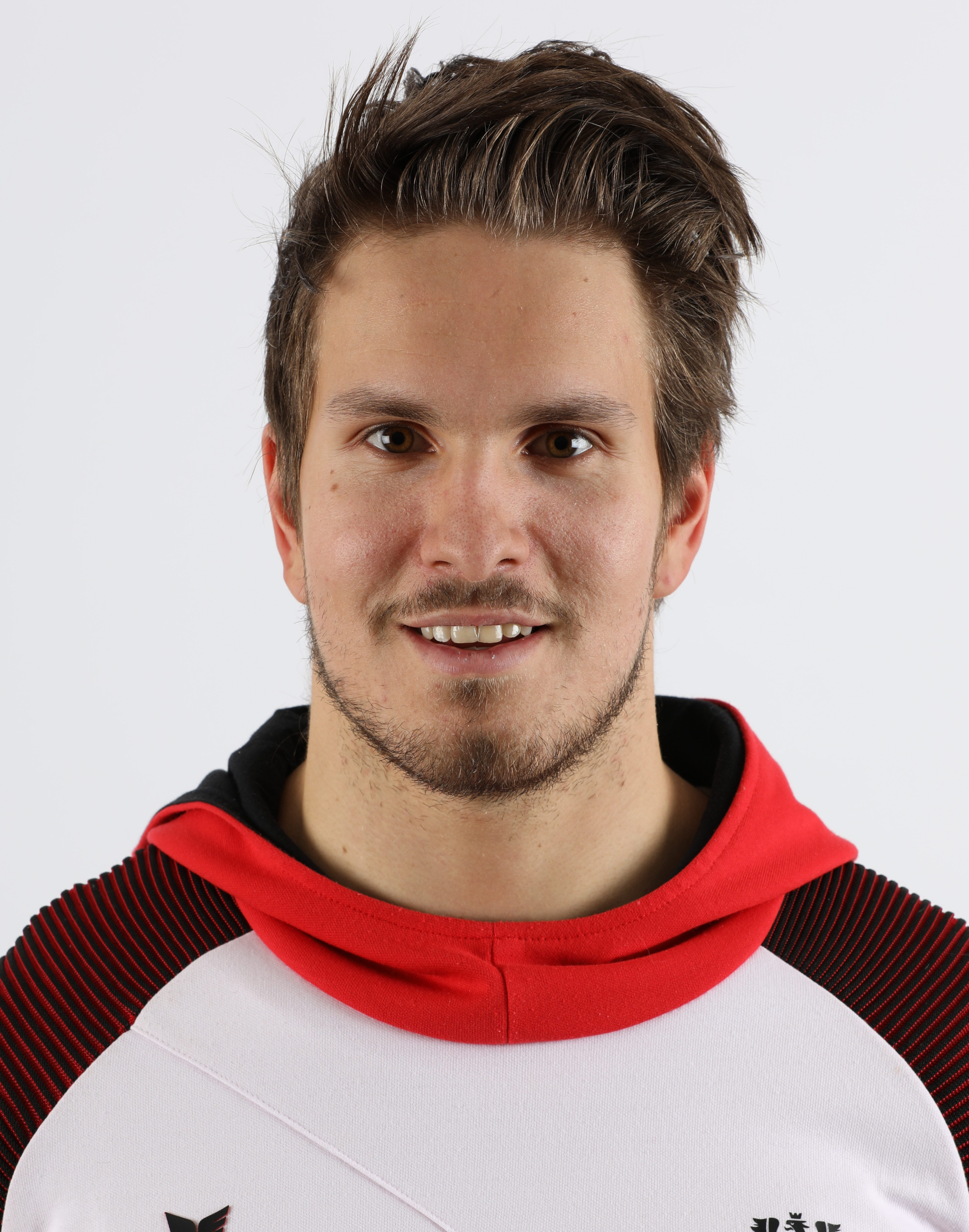
- Steu in 2018

Personal information
- Born: 9 February 1994 (age 32) Bludenz, Austria
- Height: 1.80 m (5 ft 11 in)
- Weight: 70 kg (154 lb)

Sport
- Country: Austria
- Sport: Luge
- Event: Doubles
Medal record
Men's luge
Representing Austria
Olympic Games
Silver medal – second place	2022 Beijing	Team relay
Silver medal – second place	2026 Milano Cortina	Doubles
Silver medal – second place	2026 Milano Cortina	Team relay
Bronze medal – third place	2022 Beijing	Doubles
World Championships
Gold medal – first place	2021 Königssee	Team relay
Gold medal – first place	2025 Whistler	Mixed doubles
Silver medal – second place	2019 Winterberg	Team relay
Silver medal – second place	2024 Alternberg	Doubles
Silver medal – second place	2024 Alternberg	Sprint
Silver medal – second place	2025 Whistler	Team relay
Bronze medal – third place	2019 Winterberg	Doubles
Bronze medal – third place	2019 Winterberg	Sprint
European Championships
Gold medal – first place	2020 Lillehammer	Team relay
Gold medal – first place	2024 Igls	Doubles
Gold medal – first place	2024 Igls	Team relay
Gold medal – first place	2026 Oberhof	Mixed doubles
Silver medal – second place	2017 Königssee	Team relay
Silver medal – second place	2020 Lillehammer	Doubles

Thomas Steu (born 9 February 1994) is an Austrian luger. At the 2022 Winter Olympics, he won a bronze medal in the open doubles event with Lorenz Koller and a silver medal in the team relay event.

Steu finished fourth in the doubles event with Lorenz Koller at the 2018 Winter Olympics.
