= Luge at the 2022 Winter Olympics – Men's singles =

Luge men's singles at the XXIV Olympic Winter Games
- Luge pictogram
- Venue: Xiaohaituo Bobsleigh and Luge Track
- Date: 5, 6 February 2022
- Competitors: 34 from 21 nations

Medalists
1st place, gold medalist(s)		Johannes Ludwig	Germany
2nd place, silver medalist(s)		Wolfgang Kindl	Austria
3rd place, bronze medalist(s)		Dominik Fischnaller	Italy

The men's singles competition in luge at the 2022 Winter Olympics was held on 5 February (heats 1 and 2) and 6 February (heats 3 and 4), at the Xiaohaituo Bobsleigh and Luge Track in Yanqing District. Johannes Ludwig of Germany won the event. For him this was the first individual Olympic gold medal. Wolfgang Kindl of Austria won the silver, and Dominik Fischnaller of Italy bronze. For Kindl and Fischnaller also, these were their first Olympic medals.

The defending champion was David Gleirscher, who was standing in the 10th position at the 2021–22 Luge World Cup before the Olympics and qualified for the competition. Chris Mazdzer, the 2018 silver medalist, qualified as well. Johannes Ludwig, the 2018 bronze medalist, was leading the 2021–22 Luge World Cup before the Olympics and considered the top favorite. Wolfgang Kindl was the second in the World Cup, and the 2010 and 2014 Olympic champion Felix Loch was the third.

Ludwig won three runs out of four, in two of them setting the track record. Kindl won the second run and was second in the other three. Fischnaller was third in three runs.

== Qualification ==
The qualification is based on the cumulative points of the Olympic Season from 1 July 2021 to January 10, 2022. A total of 35 quota spots are available to athletes to compete at the games. Each NOC can enter a maximum of three athletes.

In the men's singles, all nations with an athlete in the top 50 qualified one slot. If there were remaining spots left, the second best athlete of each nation in the top 32 was awarded an additional quota, with the third best being awarded a quota if there were any remaining spots.

On December 17, 2021, the International Luge Federation announced that the qualification system was changed. The qualification system was changed due to training runs being cancelled at the first World Cup, and equipment not being delivered to the following World Cups. The new system will see athletes qualify based on their top four results during the World Cup season, (as opposed to the previous all seven results counting).

On January 19, 2022 the International Luge Federation announced the list of qualified athletes.

=== Summary ===
Number of sleds	Athletes total	Nation
3	18	Germany; Austria; ROC; Latvia; Italy; United States
2	4	Slovakia; Ukraine
1	13	Canada; Romania; Australia; Sweden; Poland; Great Britain; Bulgaria; China; Czech Republic; Bosnia and Herzegovina; Georgia; Japan; South Korea (Note: quota allocated to participate in the team relay.)
35	35	

== Results ==
Rank	Bib	Athlete	Country	Run 1	Rank	Run 2	Rank	Run 3	Rank	Run 4	Rank	Total	Behind
1st place, gold medalist(s)	4	Johannes Ludwig	Germany	57.063 TR	1	57.438	2	57.043 TR	1	57.191	1	3:48.735	
2nd place, silver medalist(s)	1	Wolfgang Kindl	Austria	57.110	2	57.430	1	57.117	2	57.238	2	3:48.895	+0.160
3rd place, bronze medalist(s)	10	Dominik Fischnaller	Italy	57.361	3	57.444	3	57.461	5	57.420	3	3:49.686	+0.951
4	2	Felix Loch	Germany	57.383	5	57.500	4	57.510	7	57.485	6	3:49.878	+1.143
5	3	Kristers Aparjods	Latvia	57.364	4	57.597	6	57.399	4	57.693	9	3:50.053	+1.318
6	5	Max Langenhan	Germany	57.606	9	57.536	5	57.521	8	57.429	4	3:50.092	+1.357
7	7	Gints Bērziņš	Latvia	57.414	7	57.709	7	57.480	6	57.570	7	3:50.173	+1.438
8	18	Chris Mazdzer	United States	57.780	10	58.039	9	57.779	10	57.779	10	3:51.377	+2.642
9	12	Roman Repilov	ROC	57.594	8	58.679	16	57.714	9	57.647	8	3:51.634	+2.899
10	8	Semen Pavlichenko	ROC	57.786	11	58.115	10	57.955	13	57.793	11	3:51.649	+2.914
11	24	Leon Felderer	Italy	57.814	12	58.211	11	57.855	11	57.960	14	3:51.840	+3.105
12	6	Nico Gleirscher	Austria	59.110	27	58.351	14	57.370	3	57.452	5	3:52.283	+3.548
13	21	Tucker West	United States	58.079	15	57.831	8	58.534	21	57.916	13	3:52.360	+3.625
14	16	Aleksandr Gorbatcevich	ROC	58.139	16	58.339	13	58.080	14	58.043	15	3:52.601	+3.866
15	11	David Gleirscher	Austria	57.407	6	58.240	12	58.908	26	58.617	20	3:53.172	+4.437
16	22	Alexander Ferlazzo	Australia	58.216	19	58.994	24	58.122	16	57.887	12	3:53.219	+4.484
17	14	Reid Watts	Canada	58.049	14	59.071	25	58.108	15	58.065	16	3:53.293	+4.558
18	23	Artūrs Dārznieks	Latvia	58.166	17	59.370	28	57.932	12	58.241	17	3:53.709	+4.974
19	19	Jonathan Gustafson	United States	57.845	13	59.330	27	58.496	20	58.275	18	3:53.946	+5.211
20	34	Svante Kohala	Sweden	58.517	21	58.779	20	58.368	18	58.333	19	3:53.997	+5.262
21	15	Jozef Ninis	Slovakia	58.205	18	58.764	19	58.856	23	Did not advance		2:55.825	N/A
22	20	Anton Dukach	Ukraine	58.873	25	58.726	18	58.408	19	Did not advance		2:56.007	N/A
23	26	Rupert Staudinger	Great Britain	58.731	22	58.960	22	58.622	22	Did not advance		2:56.313	N/A
24	25	Fan Duoyao	China	58.848	23	58.883	21	58.895	25	Did not advance		2:56.626	N/A
25	35	Mateusz Sochowicz	Poland	58.863	24	59.196	26	58.867	24	Did not advance		2:56.926	N/A
26	32	Marián Skupek	Slovakia	58.956	26	58.976	23	59.051	27	Did not advance		2:56.983	N/A
27	13	Andriy Mandziy	Ukraine	1:01.082	32	58.706	17	58.346	17	Did not advance		2:58.134	N/A
28	33	Pavel Angelov	Bulgaria	59.555	29	59.753	29	59.545	29	Did not advance		2:58.853	N/A
29	17	Valentin Creţu	Romania	58.349	20	58.362	15	1:02.223	34	Did not advance		2:58.934	N/A
30	30	Michael Lejsek	Czech Republic	59.542	28	59.945	31	1:00.080	32	Did not advance		2:59.567	N/A
31	27	Saba Kumaritashvili	Georgia	1:00.211	30	1:00.146	32	1:00.036	31	Did not advance		3:00.393	N/A
32	28	Seiya Kobayashi	Japan	1:00.856	31	1:00.919	33	59.859	30	Did not advance		3:01.634	N/A
33	29	Lim Nam-kyu	South Korea	1:02.438	34	59.794	30	59.538	28	Did not advance		3:01.770	N/A
34	31	Mirza Nikolajev	Bosnia and Herzegovina	1:01.667	33	1:02.507	34	1:01.175	33	Did not advance		3:05.349	N/A
	9	Kevin Fischnaller	Italy	Did not start									
