= 2023 FIL World Luge Championships – Men's sprint =

Men's sprint at the 2023 FIL World Luge Championships
- Venue: Oberhof bobsleigh, luge, and skeleton track
- Location: Oberhof, Germany
- Date: 27 January
- Competitors: 31 from 15 nations
- Winning time: 33.544

Medalists
| gold medal | Felix Loch | Germany |
| silver medal | Jonas Müller | Austria |
| bronze medal | Max Langenhan | Germany |

The men's sprint competition at the 2023 FIL World Luge Championships was held on 27 January 2023.

== Results ==
The qualification was held at 11:40 and the final at 15:11.

| Rank | Bib | Name | Country | Qualification | | Final | |
| Rank | Bib | Name | Country | Time | Rank | Time | Diff |
|---|---|---|---|---|---|---|---|
| 1st place, gold medalist(s) | 14 | Felix Loch | Germany | 33.614 | 5 | 33.544 | |
| 2nd place, silver medalist(s) | 5 | Jonas Müller | Austria | 33.413 | 1 | 33.617 | +0.073 |
| 3rd place, bronze medalist(s) | 1 | Max Langenhan | Germany | 33.588 | 4 | 33.666 | +0.122 |
| 4 | 11 | David Gleirscher | Austria | 33.502 | 2 | 33.739 | +0.195 |
| 5 | 13 | Kristers Aparjods | Latvia | 33.662 | 7 | 33.744 | +0.200 |
| 6 | 10 | Nico Gleirscher | Austria | 33.510 | 3 | 33.757 | +0.213 |
| 7 | 15 | Dominik Fischnaller | Italy | 33.661 | 6 | 33.782 | +0.238 |
| 8 | 12 | Wolfgang Kindl | Austria | 33.707 | 10 | 33.811 | +0.267 |
| 9 | 2 | David Nößler | Germany | 33.671 | 8 | 33.865 | +0.321 |
| 10 | 3 | Timon Grancagnolo | Germany | 33.692 | 9 | 33.877 | +0.333 |
| 11 | 8 | Gints Bērziņš | Latvia | 33.840 | 14 | 33.955 | +0.411 |
| 12 | 9 | Tucker West | United States | 33.783 | 11 | 33.958 | +0.414 |
| 13 | 6 | Leon Felderer | Italy | 33.826 | 12 | 33.994 | +0.450 |
| 14 | 16 | Alexander Ferlazzo | Australia | 33.828 | 13 | 34.137 | +0.593 |
| 15 | 18 | Lukas Gufler | Italy | 33.885 | 15 | 34.205 | +0.661 |
| 16 | 20 | Svante Kohala | Sweden | 33.924 | 16 | Did not advance | |
| 17 | 4 | Jonathan Gustafson | United States | 33.961 | 17 | Did not advance | |
| 18 | 7 | Jozef Ninis | Slovakia | 33.998 | 18 | Did not advance | |
| 19 | 31 | Kaspars Rinks | Latvia | 34.060 | 19 | Did not advance | |
| 20 | 17 | Andriy Mandziy | Ukraine | 34.156 | 20 | Did not advance | |
| 21 | 24 | Mateusz Sochowicz | Poland | 34.183 | 21 | Did not advance | |
| 22 | 21 | Jozef Hušla | Slovakia | 34.194 | 22 | Did not advance | |
| 23 | 23 | Valentin Creţu | Romania | 34.201 | 23 | Did not advance | |
| 24 | 29 | Danyil Martsinovskyi | Ukraine | 34.213 | 24 | Did not advance | |
| 25 | 22 | Anton Dukach | Ukraine | 34.226 | 25 | Did not advance | |
| 26 | 19 | Marián Skupek | Slovakia | 34.324 | 26 | Did not advance | |
| 27 | 26 | Eduard Crăciun | Romania | 34.375 | 27 | Did not advance | |
| 28 | 25 | Michael Lejsek | Czech Republic | 34.639 | 28 | Did not advance | |
| 29 | 30 | Dylan Morse | Canada | 34.687 | 29 | Did not advance | |
| 30 | 28 | Seiya Kobayashi | Japan | 34.985 | 30 | Did not advance | |
| 31 | 27 | Alabati Aihemaiti | China | 34.990 | 31 | Did not advance | |
