= 2024 FIL World Luge Championships – Men's singles =

Men's singles at the 2024 FIL World Luge Championships
- Venue: Altenberg bobsleigh, luge, and skeleton track
- Location: Altenberg, Germany
- Dates: 27 January
- Competitors: 36 from 16 nations
- Winning time: 1:47.813

Medalists
gold medal	Max Langenhan	Germany
silver medal	Nico Gleirscher	Austria
bronze medal	Felix Loch	Germany

The Men's singles competition at the 2024 FIL World Luge Championships will be held on 27 January 2024.

== Results ==
The race was started at 11:03.

Rank	Bib	Name	Country	Run 1	Rank	Run 2	Rank	Total	Diff
1st place, gold medalist(s)	19	Max Langenhan	Germany	53.943	1	53.870	1	1:47.813	
2nd place, silver medalist(s)	18	Nico Gleirscher	Austria	54.230	4	54.344	3	1:48.574	+0.761
3rd place, bronze medalist(s)	14	Felix Loch	Germany	54.303	5	54.327	2	1:48.630	+0.817
4	11	Tucker West	United States	54.338	6	54.357	4	1:48.695	+0.882
5	12	Alexander Ferlazzo	Australia	54.365	7	54.440	6	1:48.805	+0.992
6	22	Jonas Müller	Austria	54.452	11	54.398	5	1:48.850	+1.037
7	15	David Gleirscher	Austria	53.966	2	54.958	17	1:48.924	+1.111
8	13	Leon Felderer	Italy	54.422	9	54.600	9	1:49.022	+1.209
9	16	Jonathan Gustafson	United States	54.494	12	54.586	8	1:49.080	+1.267
10	3	Timon Grancagnolo	Germany	54.435	10	54.701	13	1:49.136	+1.323
11	9	Gints Bērziņš	Latvia	54.597	15	54.540	7	1:49.137	+1.324
12	2	Anton Dukach	Ukraine	54.756	16	54.663	12	1:49.419	+1.606
13	1	Mateusz Sochowicz	Poland	54.869	19	54.608	10	1:49.477	+1.664
14	6	Jozef Ninis	Slovakia	54.575	14	54.937	16	1:49.512	+1.699
15	8	Andriy Mandziy	Ukraine	54.985	20	54.658	11	1:49.643	+1.830
16	5	Valentin Crețu	Romania	54.841	17	54.911	15	1:49.752	+1.939
17	25	Alex Gufler	Italy	54.861	18	54.894	14	1:49.755	+1.942
18	21	Dominik Fischnaller	Italy	54.185	3	58.389	18	1:52.574	+4.761
19	10	Kaspars Rinks	Latvia	54.381	8	1:07.428	19	2:01.809	+13.996
21	23	Lukas Peccei	Italy	55.243	21	Did not advance			
22	17	Wolfgang Kindl	Austria	55.301	22	Did not advance			
23	7	Svante Kohala	Sweden	55.339	23	Did not advance			
24	27	Seiya Kobayashi	Japan	55.532	24	Did not advance			
25	29	Dylan Morse	Canada	55.609	25	Did not advance			
26	26	Hunter Harris	United States	55.648	26	Did not advance			
27	24	Danyil Martsinovskyi	Ukraine	55.502	27	Did not advance			
28	35	Marián Skupek	Slovakia	55.539	28	Did not advance			
29	34	Mirza Nikolajev	Bosnia and Herzegovina	56.310	29	Did not advance			
30	33	Bao Zhenyu	China	56.729	30	Did not advance			
31	28	Eduard Crăciun	Romania	56.759	31	Did not advance			
32	30	Walter Vikström	Finland	58.209	32	Did not advance			
33	32	Liu Shaonan	China	58.968	33	Did not advance			
34	31	Hamza Pleho	Bosnia and Herzegovina	1:00.238	34	Did not advance			
35	20	Kristers Aparjods	Latvia	1:06.581	35	Did not advance			
–	4	David Nössler	Germany	54.545	13	Did not finish			
–	36	Li Jing	China	Did not finish					
