= 2023 FIL World Luge Championships – Men's singles =

Men's singles at the 2023 FIL World Luge Championships
- Venue: Oberhof bobsleigh, luge, and skeleton track
- Location: Oberhof, Germany
- Date: 29 January
- Competitors: 31 from 15 nations
- Winning time: 1:25.478

Medalists
gold medal	Jonas Müller	Austria
silver medal	Max Langenhan	Germany
bronze medal	David Gleirscher	Austria

The men's singles competition at the 2023 FIL World Luge Championships was held on 29 January 2023.

== Results ==
The first run was held at 10:03 and the second run at 11:38.

Rank	Bib	Name	Country	Run 1	Rank	Run 2	Rank	Total	Diff
1st place, gold medalist(s)	10	Jonas Müller	Austria	42.640	1	42.838	1	1:25.478	
2nd place, silver medalist(s)	17	Max Langenhan	Germany	42.707	3	42.875	2	1:25.582	+0.104
3rd place, bronze medalist(s)	20	David Gleirscher	Austria	42.677	2	42.922	5	1:25.599	+0.121
4	22	Felix Loch	Germany	42.744	4	42.879	4	1:25.623	+0.145
5	19	Kristers Aparjods	Latvia	42.895	6	42.877	3	1:25.772	+0.294
6	12	Wolfgang Kindl	Austria	42.871	5	43.036	7	1:25.907	+0.429
7	11	Timon Grancagnolo	Germany	42.917	7	43.050	8	1:25.967	+0.489
8	16	David Nößler	Germany	42.958	8	43.072	9	1:26.030	+0.552
9	18	Gints Bērziņš	Latvia	43.046	11	43.004	6	1:26.050	+0.572
10	13	Nico Gleirscher	Austria	42.989	9	43.076	10	1:26.065	+0.587
11	7	Leon Felderer	Italy	43.186	14	43.131	11	1:26.317	+0.839
12	9	Svante Kohala	Sweden	43.135	13	43.276	13	1:26.411	+0.933
13	14	Tucker West	United States	43.094	12	43.369	17	1:26.463	+0.985
14	8	Andriy Mandziy	Ukraine	43.218	15	43.353	15	1:26.571	+1.093
15	5	Jonathan Gustafson	United States	43.357	16	43.217	12	1:26.574	+1.096
16	3	Anton Dukach	Ukraine	43.432	19	43.303	14	1:26.735	+1.257
17	15	Jozef Ninis	Slovakia	43.428	18	43.366	16	1:26.794	+1.316
18	25	Mateusz Sochowicz	Poland	43.449	20	43.413	18	1:26.862	+1.384
19	1	Marián Skupek	Slovakia	43.457	21	Did not advance			
20	26	Jozef Hušla	Slovakia	43.607	22	Did not advance			
21	24	Valentin Creţu	Romania	43.674	23	Did not advance			
22	31	Eduard Crăciun	Romania	43.727	24	Did not advance			
23	4	Lukas Gufler	Italy	43.742	25	Did not advance			
24	23	Danyil Martsinovskyi	Ukraine	43.890	26	Did not advance			
25	28	Michael Lejsek	Czech Republic	44.052	27	Did not advance			
26	29	Alabati Aihemaiti	China	44.248	28	Did not advance			
27	30	Seiya Kobayashi	Japan	44.331	29	Did not advance			
28	27	Dylan Morse	Canada	44.459	30	Did not advance			
29	6	Alexander Ferlazzo	Australia	57.448	31	Did not advance			
—	2	Kaspars Rinks	Latvia	43.407	17	Did not finish			
—	21	Dominik Fischnaller	Italy	43.010	10	Did not finish			
