= 2025 FIL World Luge Championships – Men's singles =

Men's singles at the 2025 FIL World Luge Championships
- Venue: Whistler Sliding Centre
- Location: Whistler, British Columbia, Canada
- Dates: 8 February
- Competitors: 30 from 14 nations
- Winning time: 1:39.922

Medalists
gold medal	Max Langenhan	Germany
silver medal	Felix Loch	Germany
bronze medal	Nico Gleirscher	Austria

The Men's singles competition at the 2025 FIL World Luge Championships was held on 8 February 2025.

== Results ==
The race was started at 13:45.

Rank	Bib	Name	Country	Run 1	Rank	Run 2	Rank	Total	Diff
1st place, gold medalist(s)	18	Max Langenhan	Germany	50.024	1	49.898	1	1:39.922	
2nd place, silver medalist(s)	21	Felix Loch	Germany	50.148	3	49.909	2	1:40.057	+0.135
3rd place, bronze medalist(s)	22	Nico Gleirscher	Austria	50.086	2	50.058	3	1:40.144	+0.222
4	16	Dominik Fischnaller	Italy	50.255	5	50.087	4	1:40.342	+0.420
5	20	Jonas Müller	Austria	50.202	4	50.248	10	1:40.450	+0.528
6	19	Kristers Aparjods	Latvia	50.397	10	50.101	5	1:40.498	+0.576
7	13	Gints Bērziņš	Latvia	50.324	6	50.179	7	1:40.503	+0.581
8	10	Jonathan Gustafson	United States	50.382	9	50.159	6	1:40.541	+0.619
9	14	David Gleirscher	Austria	50.356	7	50.226	8	1:40.582	+0.660
10	17	Wolfgang Kindl	Austria	50.373	8	50.234	9	1:40.607	+0.685
11	9	Alexander Ferlazzo	Australia	50.406	11	50.260	11	1:40.666	+0.744
12	15	Tucker West	United States	50.508	12	50.391	12	1:40.899	+0.977
13	11	Timon Grancagnolo	Germany	50.529	14	50.423	13	1:40.952	+1.030
14	8	Andriy Mandziy	Ukraine	50.602	16	50.512	14	1:41.114	+1.192
15	4	Mateusz Sochowicz	Poland	50.594	15	50.657	16	1:41.251	+1.329
16	7	Anton Dukach	Ukraine	50.512	13	50.740	18	1:41.252	+1.330
17	6	David Nössler	Germany	50.631	18	50.638	15	1:41.269	+1.347
18	30	Kaspars Rinks	Latvia	50.621	17	50.696	17	1:41.317	+1.395
19	5	Leon Felderer	Italy	50.673	19	50.809	19	1:41.482	+1.560
20	12	Jozef Ninis	Slovakia	50.686	20	50.813	20	1:41.499	+1.577
21	3	Alex Gufler	Italy	50.757	21	Did not advance			
22	1	Theo Downey	Canada	50.815	22	Did not advance			
23	23	Seiya Kobayashi	Japan	50.891	23	Did not advance			
24	2	Marián Skupek	Slovakia	50.932	24	Did not advance			
25	24	Svante Kohala	Sweden	50.940	25	Did not advance			
26	28	Dylan Morse	Canada	50.941	26	Did not advance			
27	27	Valentin Crețu	Romania	51.002	27	Did not advance			
28	25	Bastian van Wouw	Canada	51.236	28	Did not advance			
29	26	Eduard Crăciun	Romania	51.566	29	Did not advance			
30	29	Walter Vikström	Finland	53.197	30	Did not advance			
