= 2024 FIL World Luge Championships – Men's sprint =

Men's sprint at the 2024 FIL World Luge Championships
- Venue: Altenberg bobsleigh, luge, and skeleton track
- Location: Altenberg, Germany
- Dates: 26 January
- Competitors: 35 from 16 nations
- Winning time: 33.001

Medalists
gold medal	David Gleirscher	Austria
silver medal	Max Langenhan	Germany
bronze medal	Kristers Aparjods	Latvia

The Men's sprint competition at the 2024 FIL World Luge Championships was held on 26 January 2024.

== Results ==
The qualification was started at 10:45. The final was started at 14:48.

Rank	Bib	Name	Country	Qualification		Final	
Rank	Bib	Name	Country	Time	Rank	Time	Diff
1st place, gold medalist(s)	8	David Gleirscher	Austria	33.387	6	33.001	1
2nd place, silver medalist(s)	15	Max Langenhan	Germany	33.166	1	33.071	2
3rd place, bronze medalist(s)	12	Kristers Aparjods	Latvia	33.456	11	33.124	3
4	10	Felix Loch	Germany	33.232	2	33.164	4
5	9	Wolfgang Kindl	Austria	33.245	3	33.239	5
6	13	Nico Gleirscher	Austria	33.336	4	33.260	6
7	14	Jonas Müller	Austria	33.395	7	33.275	7
8	17	Jozef Hušla	Slovakia	33.436	10	33.350	8
9	6	Tucker West	United States	33.359	5	33.397	9
10	1	Gints Bērziņš	Latvia	33.576	15	33.442	10
11	7	Jonathan Gustafson	United States	33.418	8	33.452	11
12	16	Andriy Mandziy	Ukraine	33.520	13	33.784	12
13	11	Dominik Fischnaller	Italy	33.468	12	33.799	13
14	4	David Nössler	Germany	33.418	8	33.868	14
15	22	Timon Grancagnolo	Germany	33.543	14	33.977	15
16	2	Leon Felderer	Italy	33.591	16	Did not advance	
17	19	Mateusz Sochowicz	Poland	33.610	17	Did not advance	
18	30	Kaspars Rinks	Latvia	33.622	18	Did not advance	
19	21	Alex Gufler	Italy	33.638	19	Did not advance	
20	3	Anton Dukach	Ukraine	33.686	20	Did not advance	
21	5	Alexander Ferlazzo	Australia	33.725	21	Did not advance	
22	20	Valentin Crețu	Romania	33.773	22	Did not advance	
23	18	Hunter Harris	United States	33.929	23	Did not advance	
24	25	Lukas Peccei	Italy	33.979	24	Did not advance	
25	26	Svante Kohala	Sweden	34.056	25	Did not advance	
26	23	Marián Skupek	Slovakia	34.076	26	Did not advance	
27	27	Dylan Morse	Canada	34.323	27	Did not advance	
28	29	Seiya Kobayashi	Japan	34.333	28	Did not advance	
29	24	Eduard Crăciun	Romania	34.550	29	Did not advance	
30	33	Bao Zhenyu	China	34.558	30	Did not advance	
31	32	Li Jing	China	35.777	31	Did not advance	
32	34	Liu Shaonan	China	36.064	32	Did not advance	
33	36	Walter Vikström	Finland	36.565	33	Did not advance	
34	35	Hamza Pleho	Bosnia and Herzegovina	36.686	34	Did not advance	
35	28	Danyil Martsinovskyi	Ukraine	36.718	35	Did not advance	
–	31	Mirza Nikolajev	Bosnia and Herzegovina	Did not start			
