= 2021 FIL World Luge Championships – Men's singles =

Men's singles at the 2021 FIL World Luge Championships
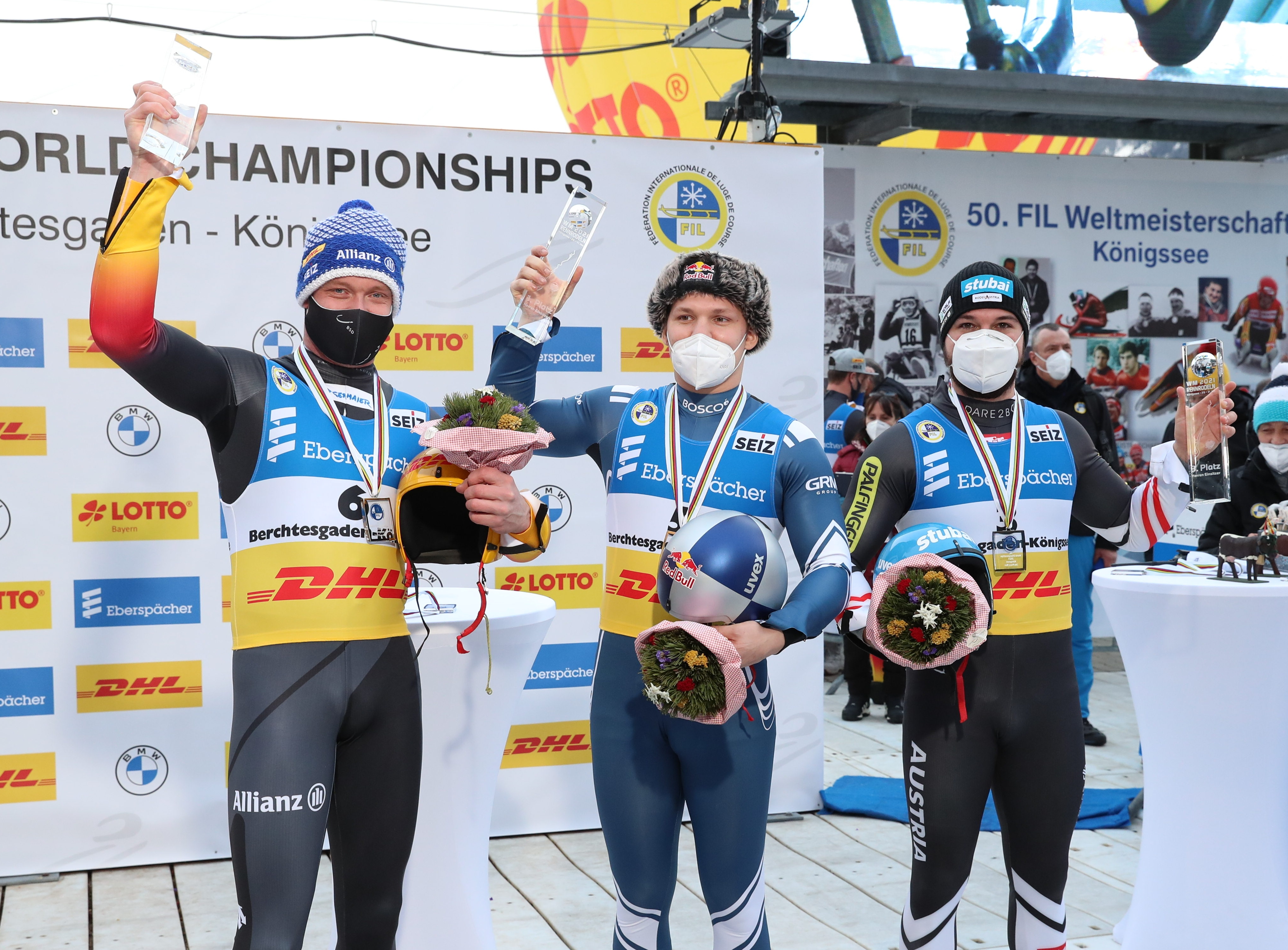
- Men's at the FIL World Luge Championships Königssee 2021 by Sandro Halank–
- Venue: Königssee bobsleigh, luge, and skeleton track
- Location: Königssee, Germany
- Dates: 30 January
- Competitors: 39 from 18 nations
- Winning time: 1:37.810

Medalists
gold medal	Roman Repilov
silver medal	Felix Loch	Germany
bronze medal	David Gleirscher	Austria

The Men's singles competition at the 2021 FIL World Luge Championships was held on 30 January 2021.

== Results ==
The first run was started at 12:50 and the final run at 15:00.

Rank	Bib	Name	Country	Run 1	Rank	Run 2	Rank	Total	Diff
1st place, gold medalist(s)	5	Roman Repilov	Russian Luge Federation	48.805	2	49.005	1	1:37.810	
2nd place, silver medalist(s)	6	Felix Loch	Germany	48.803^{TR}	1	49.069	3	1:37.872	+0.062
3rd place, bronze medalist(s)	3	David Gleirscher	Austria	49.018	6	49.009	2	1:38.027	+0.217
4	1	Max Langenhan	Germany	48.891	3	49.168	6	1:38.059	+0.249
5	4	Johannes Ludwig	Germany	48.955	4	49.106	4	1:38.061	+0.251
6	12	Jonas Müller	Austria	49.178	8	49.164	5	1:38.342	+0.532
7	11	Wolfgang Kindl	Austria	49.201	10	49.200	7	1:38.401	+0.591
8	2	Semen Pavlichenko	Russian Luge Federation	48.993	5	49.496	10	1:38.489	+0.679
9	14	Kevin Fischnaller	Italy	49.176	7	49.498	11	1:38.674	+0.864
10	17	Chris Mazdzer	United States	49.364	15	49.318	8	1:38.692	+0.872
11	16	Moritz Bollmann	Germany	49.220	11	49.563	16	1:38.783	+0.973
12	20	Jozef Ninis	Slovakia	49.428	17	49.429	9	1:38.857	+1.047
13	9	Aleksandr Gorbatcevich	Russian Luge Federation	49.293	13	49.571	17	1:38.864	+1.054
14	21	Tucker West	United States	49.199	9	49.670	19	1:38.869	+1.059
15	13	Nico Gleirscher	Austria	49.361	14	49.603	18	1:38.964	+1.154
16	27	Mateusz Sochowicz	Poland	49.521	18	49.562	15	1:39.083	+1.273
17	15	Gints Bērziņš	Latvia	49.560	19	49.560	14	1:39.120	+1.310
18	26	Reid Watts	Canada	49.387	16	49.735	22	1:39.122	+1.312
19	24	Svante Kohala	Sweden	49.689	24	49.545	12	1:39.234	+1.424
20	28	Anton Dukach	Ukraine	49.596	20	49.728	21	1:39.324	+1.514
21	10	Riks Kristens Rozītis	Latvia	49.789	25	49.546	13	1:39.335	+1.525
22	22	Andriy Mandziy	Ukraine	49.662	23	49.688	20	1:39.350	+1.540
23	8	Artūrs Dārznieks	Latvia	49.273	12	50.317	24	1:39.590	+1.780
24	30	Valentin Crețu	Romania	49.649	22	50.284	23	1:39.933	+2.123
25	25	Leon Felderer	Italy	49.606	21	50.388	25	1:39.994	+2.184
–	29	Rupert Staudinger	Great Britain	50.196	26	Did not advance			
–	31	Marián Skupek	Slovakia	50.238	27	Did not advance			
–	38	Eduard Crăciun	Romania	50.250	28	Did not advance			
–	32	Jozef Hušla	Slovakia	50.405	29	Did not advance			
–	33	Michael Lejsek	Czech Republic	50.513	30	Did not advance			
–	19	Jonathan Gustafson	United States	50.746	31	Did not advance			
–	23	Lukas Gufler	Italy	50.770	32	Did not advance			
–	36	Mirza Nikolajev	Bosnia and Herzegovina	51.019	33	Did not advance			
–	34	Lim Nam-kyu	South Korea	51.149	34	Did not advance			
–	37	Pavel Angelov	Bulgaria	51.757	35	Did not advance			
–	40	Kacper Tarnawski	Poland	52.877	36	Did not advance			
–	39	Ionuț Șișcanu	Moldova	52.925	37	Did not advance			
–	35	Theodor Turea	Romania	54.673	38	Did not advance			
–	7	Dominik Fischnaller	Italy	Did not finish					
–	18	Pavel Repilov	Russian Luge Federation	Did not start					
