= 2025 FIL World Luge Championships – Mixed singles =

Mixed singles at the 2025 FIL World Luge Championships
- Venue: Whistler Sliding Centre
- Location: Whistler, British Columbia, Canada
- Dates: 6 February
- Competitors: 42 from 18 nations
- Teams: 21
- Winning time: 1:22.354

Medalists
gold medal	Max Langenhan; Julia Taubitz	Germany
silver medal	Jonathan Gustafson; Emily Sweeney	United States
bronze medal	David Gleirscher; Madeleine Egle	Austria

The Mixed singles competition at the 2025 FIL World Luge Championships was held on 6 February 2025.

== Results ==
The race was started at 11:45.

Rank	Bib	Name	Team	Time	Diff
1st place, gold medalist(s)	21	Max Langenhan; Julia Taubitz	Germany 1	1:22.354	
2nd place, silver medalist(s)	14	Jonathan Gustafson; Emily Sweeney	United States 1	1:22.449	+0.095
3rd place, bronze medalist(s)	18	David Gleirscher; Madeleine Egle	Austria 2	1:22.678	+0.324
4	17	Kristers Aparjods; Elīna Ieva Bota	Latvia 1	1:22.706	+0.352
5	20	Nico Gleirscher; Lisa Schulte	Austria 1	1:22.773	+0.419
6	13	Alexander Ferlazzo; Natalie Maag	Australia; Switzerland	1:22.793	+0.439
7	16	Dominik Fischnaller; Verena Hofer	Italy 1	1:22.821	+0.467
8	15	Gints Bērziņš; Kendija Aparjode	Latvia 2	1:22.859	+0.505
9	9	Leon Felderer; Sandra Robatscher	Italy 2	1:22.963	+0.609
10	12	Tucker West; Ashley Farquharson	United States 2	1:22.975	+0.621
11	3	Dylan Morse; Trinity Ellis	Canada 1	1:23.268	+0.914
12	2	Theo Downey; Embyr-Lee Susko	Canada 2	1:23.299	+0.945
13	10	Anton Dukach; Yulianna Tunytska	Ukraine 1	1:23.345	+0.991
14	7	Mateusz Sochowicz; Klaudia Domaradzka	Poland	1:23.381	+1.027
15	8	Jozef Ninis; Verónica María Ravenna	Slovakia; Argentina	1:23.615	+1.261
16	5	Andriy Mandziy; Olena Smaha	Ukraine 2	1:23.679	+1.325
17	11	Svante Kohala; Tove Kohala	Sweden	1:23.821	+1.467
18	6	Valentin Crețu; Ioana Buzăţoiu	Romania	1:24.209	+1.855
19	1	Walter Vikström; Jung Hye-sun	Finland; South Korea	1:25.334	+2.980
	4	Seiya Kobayashi; Elsa Desmond	Japan; Ireland	Disqualified	
	19	David Nössler; Merle Fräbel	Germany 2	Disqualified	
