= 2021 FIL World Luge Championships – Men's sprint =

Men's sprint at the 2021 FIL World Luge Championships
- Venue: Königssee bobsleigh, luge, and skeleton track
- Location: Königssee, Germany
- Dates: 29 January
- Competitors: 40 from 18 nations
- Winning time: 38.375

Medalists
gold medal	Nico Gleirscher	Austria
silver medal	Semen Pavlichenko
bronze medal	David Gleirscher	Austria

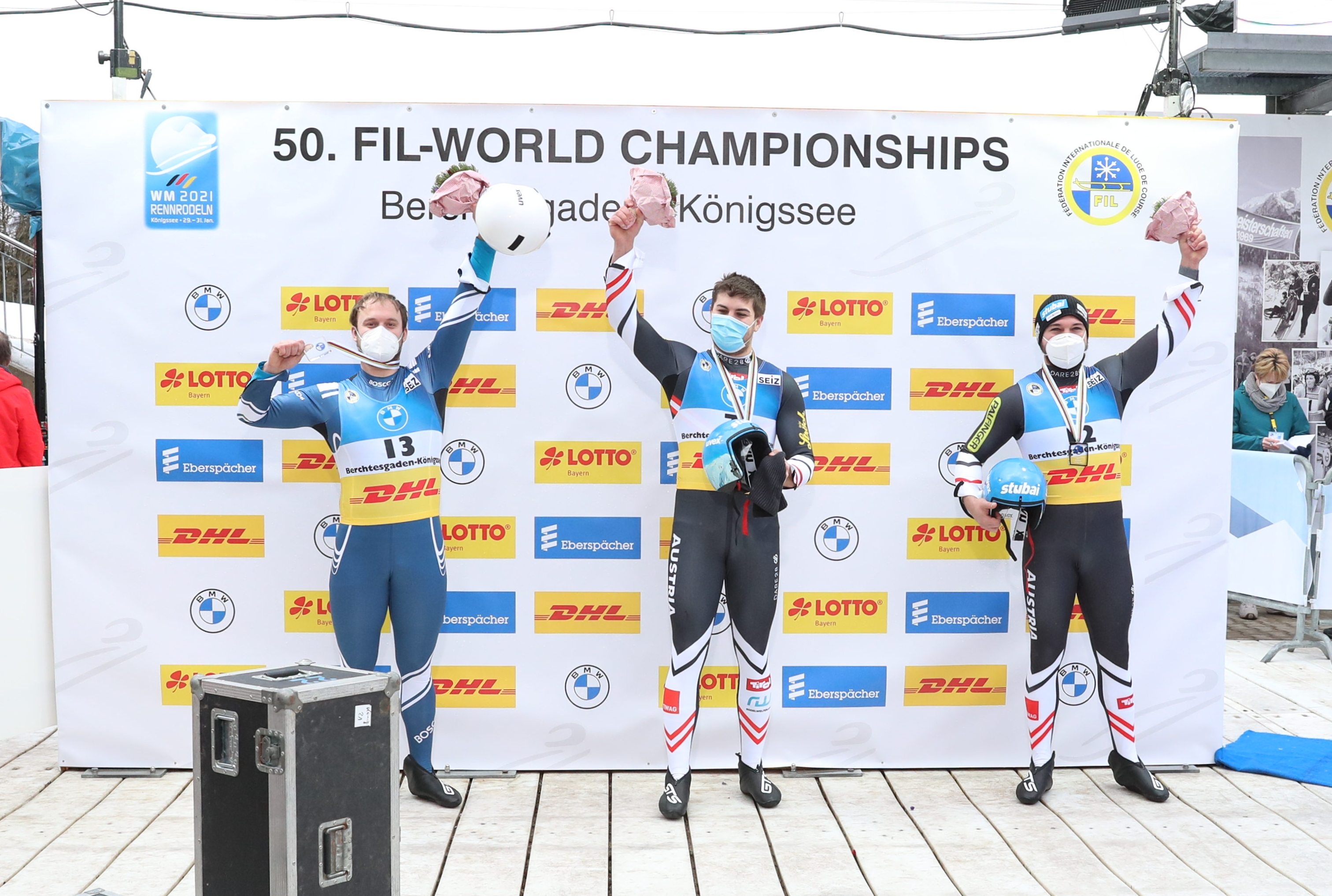
Men's Sprint at the FIL World Luge Championships Königssee 2021 by Sandro Halank

The men's sprint competition at the 2021 FIL World Luge Championships was held on 29 January 2021.

== Results ==
The qualification was held at 09:00 and the final at 12:49.

Rank	Bib	Name	Country	Qualification		Final	
Rank	Bib	Name	Country	Time	Rank	Time	Diff
1st place, gold medalist(s)	8	Nico Gleirscher	Austria	38.663	9	38.375	
2nd place, silver medalist(s)	13	Semen Pavlichenko	Russian Luge Federation	38.460	3	38.416	+0.041
3rd place, bronze medalist(s)	7	David Gleirscher	Austria	38.554	4	38.417	+0.042
4	15	Felix Loch	Germany	38.340	1	38.485	+0.110
5	12	Dominik Fischnaller	Italy	38.929	15	38.526	+0.151
6	11	Max Langenhan	Germany	38.572	5	38.532	+0.157
7	9	Roman Repilov	Russian Luge Federation	38.588	6	38.544	+0.169
8	10	Kevin Fischnaller	Italy	38.653	8	38.674	+0.299
9	14	Johannes Ludwig	Germany	38.453	2	38.721	+0.346
10	16	Gints Bērziņš	Latvia	38.808	12	38.739	+0.364
11	3	Artūrs Dārznieks	Latvia	38.594	7	38.938	+0.563
12	32	Tucker West	United States	38.874	13	39.031	+0.656
13	17	Andriy Mandziy	Ukraine	38.908	14	39.388	+1.013
14	4	Aleksandr Gorbatcevich	Russian Luge Federation	38.703	11	40.451	+2.076
15	5	Wolfgang Kindl	Austria	38.679	10	48.696	+10.321
16	24	Chris Mazdzer	United States	38.930	16	Did not advance	
17	1	Moritz Bollmann	Germany	38.937	17	Did not advance	
18	20	Lukas Gufler	Italy	39.021	18	Did not advance	
19	36	Reid Watts	Canada	39.024	19	Did not advance	
20	21	Svante Kohala	Sweden	39.048	20	Did not advance	
21	18	Jozef Ninis	Slovakia	39.186	21	Did not advance	
22	27	Valentin Crețu	Romania	39.187	22	Did not advance	
23	25	Jonathan Gustafson	United States	39.226	23	Did not advance	
24	22	Anton Dukach	Ukraine	39.256	24	Did not advance	
25	2	Riks Kristens Rozītis	Latvia	39.273	25	Did not advance	
26	28	Marián Skupek	Slovakia	39.434	26	Did not advance	
27	33	Rupert Staudinger	Great Britain	39.751	27	Did not advance	
28	19	Mateusz Sochowicz	Poland	39.829	28	Did not advance	
29	29	Mirza Nikolajev	Bosnia and Herzegovina	39.981	29	Did not advance	
30	23	Leon Felderer	Italy	40.028	30	Did not advance	
31	30	Michael Lejsek	Czech Republic	40.044	31	Did not advance	
32	39	Eduard Crăciun	Romania	40.206	32	Did not advance	
33	35	Lim Nam-kyu	South Korea	40.407	33	Did not advance	
34	38	Jozef Hušla	Slovakia	40.819	34	Did not advance	
35	37	Theodor Turea	Romania	40.985	35	Did not advance	
36	6	Jonas Müller	Austria	41.237	36	Did not advance	
37	40	Ionuț Șișcanu	Moldova	41.933	37	Did not advance	
38	31	Kacper Tarnawski	Poland	59.143	38	Did not advance	
	26	Pavel Repilov	Russian Luge Federation	Did not finish		Did not advance	
	34	Pavel Angelov	Bulgaria	Did not finish		Did not advance	
