= 2020 FIL World Luge Championships – Men's singles =

Men's singles at the 2020 FIL World Luge Championships
- Venue: Sliding Center Sanki
- Location: Sochi, Russia
- Dates: 16 February
- Competitors: 34 from 15 nations
- Winning time: 1:43.099

Medalists
gold medal	Roman Repilov	Russia
silver medal	Jonas Müller	Austria
bronze medal	Wolfgang Kindl	Austria

The Men's singles competition at the 2020 FIL World Luge Championships was held on 16 February 2020.

== Results ==
The first run was held at 13:19 and the second run at 15:24.

Rank	Bib	Name	Country	Run 1	Rank	Run 2	Rank	Total	Diff
1st place, gold medalist(s)	3	Roman Repilov	Russia	51.513	2	51.586	2	1:43.099	
2nd place, silver medalist(s)	16	Jonas Müller	Austria	51.564	4	51.567	1	1:43.131	+0.032
3rd place, bronze medalist(s)	15	Wolfgang Kindl	Austria	51.646	6	51.655	4	1:43.301	+0.202
4	2	Johannes Ludwig	Germany	51.539	3	51.786	7	1:43.325	+0.226
5	11	Kristers Aparjods	Latvia	51.768	11	51.614	3	1:43.382	+0.283
6	1	Aleksandr Gorbatcevich	Russia	51.610	5	51.811	9	1:43.421	+0.322
7	5	Semen Pavlichenko	Russia	51.663	7	51.790	8	1:43.453	+0.354
8	13	Kevin Fischnaller	Italy	51.762	9	51.760	6	1:43.522	+0.423
9	10	Felix Loch	Germany	51.726	8	51.817	10	1:43.543	+0.444
10	6	Dominik Fischnaller	Italy	51.878	15	51.706	5	1:43.584	+0.485
11	9	Maksim Aravin	Russia	51.763	10	51.890	11	1:43.653	+0.554
12	17	Jozef Ninis	Slovakia	51.831	13	51.906	12	1:43.737	+0.638
13	4	Inārs Kivlenieks	Latvia	51.838	14	51.967	16	1:43.805	+0.706
14	20	Tucker West	United States	51.976	16	51.908	13	1:43.884	+0.785
15	18	Riks Rozītis	Latvia	52.088	19	51.929	15	1:44.017	+0.918
16	21	Sebastian Bley	Germany	52.176	20	51.916	14	1:44.092	+0.993
17	22	Jonathan Gustafson	United States	52.069	18	52.093	17	1:44.162	+1.063
18	12	Arturs Dārznieks	Latvia	52.208	21	52.113	18	1:44.321	+1.222
19	19	Chris Mazdzer	United States	52.057	17	52.317	20	1:44.374	+1.275
20	30	Valentin Crețu	Romania	52.459	24	52.206	19	1:44.665	+1.566
21	8	Max Langenhan	Germany	52.450	23	52.319	21	1:44.769	+1.670
22	23	Mateusz Sochowicz	Poland	52.401	22	52.468	22	1:44.869	+1.770
23	26	Aleksandr Dmitriev	Kazakhstan	52.572	25	52.833	23	1:45.405	+2.306
24	14	Reinhard Egger	Austria	51.795	12	1:04.038	24	1:55.833	+12.734
25	28	Svante Kohala	Sweden	52.775	Did not advance				
26	25	Jakub Šimoňák	Slovakia	53.014	Did not advance				
27	24	Alexander Ferlazzo	Australia	53.065	Did not advance				
28	29	Kacper Tarnawski	Poland	53.079	Did not advance				
29	34	Michael Lejsek	Czech Republic	53.187	Did not advance				
30	33	Lim Nam-kyu	South Korea	53.296	Did not advance				
31	32	Rupert Staudinger	Great Britain	53.314	Did not advance				
32	31	Theodor Turea	Romania	53.416	Did not advance				
33	27	Alexey Dmitriev	Kazakhstan	54.377	Did not advance				
	7	David Gleirscher	Austria	51.466 TR	1	Did not finish			
