= 2023 FIL European Luge Championships – Men's singles =

Men's singles at the 2023 FIL European Luge Championships
- Venue: Sigulda bobsleigh, luge, and skeleton track
- Location: Sigulda, Latvia
- Dates: 14 January
- Competitors: 25 from 11 nations
- Winning time: 1:37.588

Medalists
gold medal	Max Langenhan	Germany
silver medal	Felix Loch	Germany
bronze medal	Kristers Aparjods	Latvia

The men's singles competition at the 2023 FIL European Luge Championships was held on 14 January 2023.

== Results ==
The first run was held at 13:13 and the second run at 14:35.

Rank	Bib	Name	Country	Run 1	Rank	Run 2	Rank	Total	Diff
1st place, gold medalist(s)	13	Max Langenhan	Germany	49.178	11	48.410	1	1:37.588	
2nd place, silver medalist(s)	28	Felix Loch	Germany	49.066	8	48.580	2	1:37.646	+0.058
3rd place, bronze medalist(s)	27	Kristers Aparjods	Latvia	48.771	2	48.902	6	1:37.673	+0.085
4	20	Nico Gleirscher	Austria	48.739	1	49.094	11	1:37.833	+0.245
5	24	Dominik Fischnaller	Italy	48.949	6	48.967	8	1:37.916	+0.328
6	21	Gints Bērziņš	Latvia	48.893	4	49.129	12	1:38.022	+0.434
7	19	Jozef Ninis	Slovakia	48.898	5	49.135	13	1:38.033	+0.445
8	22	David Nößler	Germany	49.287	13	48.879	5	1:38.166	+0.578
9	15	Anton Dukach	Ukraine	49.085	9	49.155	14	1:38.240	+0.652
10	25	David Gleirscher	Austria	49.409	14	48.865	4	1:38.274	+0.686
11	9	Andriy Mandziy	Ukraine	48.867	3	49.451	18	1:38.318	+0.730
12	10	Valentin Crețu	Romania	49.161	10	49.195	15	1:38.356	+0.768
13	14	Lukas Gufler	Italy	49.540	18	48.863	3	1:38.403	+0.815
14	18	Timon Grancagnolo	Germany	49.207	12	49.245	16	1:38.452	+0.864
15	17	Mateusz Sochowicz	Poland	49.516	16	49.065	10	1:38.581	+0.993
16	11	Svante Kohala	Sweden	49.526	17	49.062	9	1:38.588	+1.000
17	8	Marián Skupek	Slovakia	49.815	20	48.940	7	1:38.755	+1.167
18	26	Wolfgang Kindl	Austria	48.999	7	49.955	22	1:38.954	+1.366
19	4	Eduard Crăciun	Romania	49.484	15	49.643	19	1:39.127	+1.539
20	7	Jozef Hušla	Slovakia	49.903	21	49.380	17	1:39.283	+1.695
21	5	Saba Kumaritashvili	Georgia	49.785	19	49.680	21	1:39.465	+1.877
22	6	Michael Lejsek	Czech Republic	49.954	22	49.661	20	1:39.615	+2.027
23	1	Lasha Mtchedliani	Georgia	50.503	24	50.874	24	1:41.377	+3.789
24	2	Luka Mtchedliani	Georgia	50.575	25	50.837	23	1:41.412	+3.824
25	23	Leon Felderer	Italy	50.416	23	58.179	25	1:48.595	+11.007
