= 2020 FIL World Luge Championships – Men's sprint =

Men's sprint at the 2020 FIL World Luge Championships
- Venue: Sliding Center Sanki
- Location: Sochi, Russia
- Dates: 14 February
- Competitors: 34 from 15 nations
- Winning time: 34.901

Medalists
gold medal	Roman Repilov	Russia
silver medal	David Gleirscher	Austria
bronze medal	Dominik Fischnaller	Italy

The Men's sprint competition at the 2020 FIL World Luge Championships was held on 14 February 2020.

== Results ==
The qualification was held at 11:15 and the final at 15:23.

Rank	Bib	Name	Country	Qualification		Final	
Rank	Bib	Name	Country	Time	Rank	Time	Diff
1st place, gold medalist(s)	15	Roman Repilov	Russia	35.404	9	34.901	
2nd place, silver medalist(s)	12	David Gleirscher	Austria	35.195	3	34.907	+0.006
3rd place, bronze medalist(s)	14	Dominik Fischnaller	Italy	35.289	8	34.959	+0.058
4	18	Aleksandr Gorbatcevich	Russia	35.234	4	34.970	+0.069
5	10	Jonas Müller	Austria	35.240	5	34.988	+0.087
6	16	Maksim Aravin	Russia	35.248	6	34.994	+0.093
7	4	Kristers Aparjods	Latvia	35.074	1	35.025	+0.124
8	7	Wolfgang Kindl	Austria	35.272	7	35.043	+0.142
9	9	Reinhard Egger	Austria	35.515	15	35.047	+0.146
10	22	Jozef Ninis	Slovakia	35.423	10	35.087	+0.186
11	13	Semen Pavlichenko	Russia	35.164	2	35.091	+0.190
12	2	Kevin Fischnaller	Italy	35.432	11	35.168	+0.267
13	8	Felix Loch	Germany	35.455	12	35.223	+0.322
14	21	Sebastian Bley	Germany	35.455	12	35.255	+0.354
15	17	Riks Rozītis	Latvia	35.472	14	35.764	+0.863
16	19	Jonathan Gustafson	United States	35.558	16	Did not advance	
17	3	Inārs Kivlenieks	Latvia	35.585	17	Did not advance	
18	11	Johannes Ludwig	Germany	35.612	18	Did not advance	
19	1	Chris Mazdzer	United States	35.622	19	Did not advance	
20	20	Arturs Dārznieks	Latvia	35.662	20	Did not advance	
21	24	Valentin Crețu	Romania	35.667	21	Did not advance	
22	23	Mateusz Sochowicz	Poland	35.736	22	Did not advance	
23	6	Max Langenhan	Germany	35.778	23	Did not advance	
24	5	Tucker West	United States	35.781	24	Did not advance	
25	33	Alexey Dmitriev	Kazakhstan	35.901	25	Did not advance	
26	25	Jakub Šimoňák	Slovakia	35.902	26	Did not advance	
27	27	Svante Kohala	Sweden	35.982	27	Did not advance	
28	26	Alexander Ferlazzo	Australia	35.986	28	Did not advance	
29	32	Aleksandr Dmitriev	Kazakhstan	36.013	29	Did not advance	
30	30	Theodor Turea	Romania	36.046	30	Did not advance	
31	29	Kacper Tarnawski	Poland	36.180	31	Did not advance	
32	31	Rupert Staudinger	Great Britain	36.246	32	Did not advance	
33	34	Lim Nam-kyu	South Korea	36.435	33	Did not advance	
34	28	Michael Lejsek	Czech Republic	36.600	34	Did not advance	
