= Luge at the 2026 Winter Olympics – Men's singles =

Luge men's singles at the XXV Olympic Winter Games
- Luge pictogram
- Venue: Cortina Sliding Centre
- Date: 7, 8 February 2026
- Competitors: 25 from 15 nations
- Winning time: 3:31.191

Medalists
1st place, gold medalist(s)		Max Langenhan	Germany
2nd place, silver medalist(s)		Jonas Müller	Austria
3rd place, bronze medalist(s)		Dominik Fischnaller	Italy

The men's singles competition in luge at the 2026 Winter Olympics was held on 7 February (heats 1 and 2) and 8 February (heats 3 and 4), at the Cortina Sliding Centre in Cortina d'Ampezzo. Max Langenhan of Germany won the event, setting a new track record in every single run. Jonas Müller of Austria won the silver medal, and Dominik Fischnaller of Italy the bronze. For Langenhan and Müller, these were their first Olympic medals, while Fischnaller repeated his 2022 performance.

== Background ==
The 2022 champion, Johannes Ludwig, retired. The silver medalist, Wolfgang Kindl, qualified for the 2026 Olympics, as did the bronze medalist, Dominik Fischnaller. Felix Loch, the 2010 and 2014 Olympic champion, was leading the singles standing of 2025–26 Luge World Cup before the Olympics. Max Langenhan was the 2025 World champion, with Loch second and Kristers Aparjods third.

== Qualification ==
=== Summary ===
Number of sleds	Athletes total	Nation
3	9	Austria; Germany; Italy
2	8	Latvia; Romania; Ukraine; United States
1	8	Australia; China; Czech Republic; Individual Neutral Athletes; Japan; Poland; Slovakia; Sweden
25	25	

== Results ==
Rank	Bib	Athlete	Country	Run 1	Rank	Run 2	Rank	Run 3	Rank	Run 4	Rank	Total	Behind
1st place, gold medalist(s)	1	Max Langenhan	Germany	52.924 TR	1	52.902 TR	1	52.705 TR	1	52.660 TR	1	3:31.191	—
2nd place, silver medalist(s)	5	Jonas Müller	Austria	52.959	2	53.029	2	52.837	2	52.962	2	3:31.787	+0.596
3rd place, bronze medalist(s)	12	Dominik Fischnaller	Italy	53.085	3	53.039	3	52.949	3	53.052	3	3:32.125	+0.934
4	3	Kristers Aparjods	Latvia	53.221	4	53.113	4	53.208	7	53.070	4	3:32.612	+1.421
5	6	Nico Gleirscher	Austria	53.273	6	53.412	8	53.053	4	53.235	7	3:32.973	+1.782
6	2	Felix Loch	Germany	53.418	9	53.327	6	53.160	5	53.146	5	3:33.051	+1.860
7	10	Leon Felderer	Italy	53.224	5	53.367	7	53.221	8	53.305	8	3:33.117	+1.926
8	8	Wolfgang Kindl	Austria	53.385	7	53.321	5	53.171	6	53.388	9	3:33.265	+2.074
9	9	Timon Grancagnolo	Germany	53.406	8	53.438	10	53.501	10	53.147	6	3:33.942	+2.301
10	4	Gints Bērziņš	Latvia	53.462	10	53.424	9	53.415	9	53.742	17	3:34.043	+2.852
11	11	Jonathan Gustafson	United States	53.500	11	53.801	14	53.553	12	53.578	12	3:34.432	+3.241
12	7	Andriy Mandziy	Ukraine	53.815	16	53.725	12	53.633	14	53.601	13	3:34.774	+3.583
13	18	Svante Kohala	Sweden	53.752	14	53.875	17	53.584	13	53.676	14	3:34.887	+3.696
14	21	Pavel Repilov	Individual Neutral Athletes	53.861	17	53.847	15	53.692	16	53.563	11	3:34.963	+3.772
15	13	Valentin Creţu	Romania	53.702	12	53.780	13	53.526	11	53.978	19	3:34.986	+3.795
16	17	Anton Dukach	Ukraine	53.748	13	53.712	11	54.188	22	53.556	10	3:35.204	+4.013
17	23	Alex Gufler	Italy	53.903	18	53.866	16	53.690	15	53.748	18	3:35.207	+4.016
18	15	Alexander Ferlazzo	Australia	54.013	20	53.999	19	53.800	17	53.734	16	3:35.546	+4.355
19	24	Jozef Ninis	Slovakia	53.986	19	54.097	20	53.824	18	53.693	15	3:35.600	+4.409
20	20	Matthew Greiner	United States	53.814	15	53.946	18	53.936	19	54.176	20	3:35.872	+4.681
21	22	Mateusz Sochowicz	Poland	54.676	23	54.332	22	54.015	20	Did not advance		2:43.023	—
22	14	Ondřej Hyman	Czech Republic	54.299	21	54.318	21	54.821	24	Did not advance		2:43.438	—
23	16	Eduard Crăciun	Romania	54.784	25	54.809	24	54.177	21	Did not advance		2:43.770	—
24	25	Bao Zhenyu	China	54.648	22	54.896	25	54.683	23	Did not advance		2:44.227	—
25	19	Seiya Kobayashi	Japan	54.679	24	54.645	23	55.106	25	Did not advance		2:44.430	—
