= Max Langenhan =

German luger (born 1999)

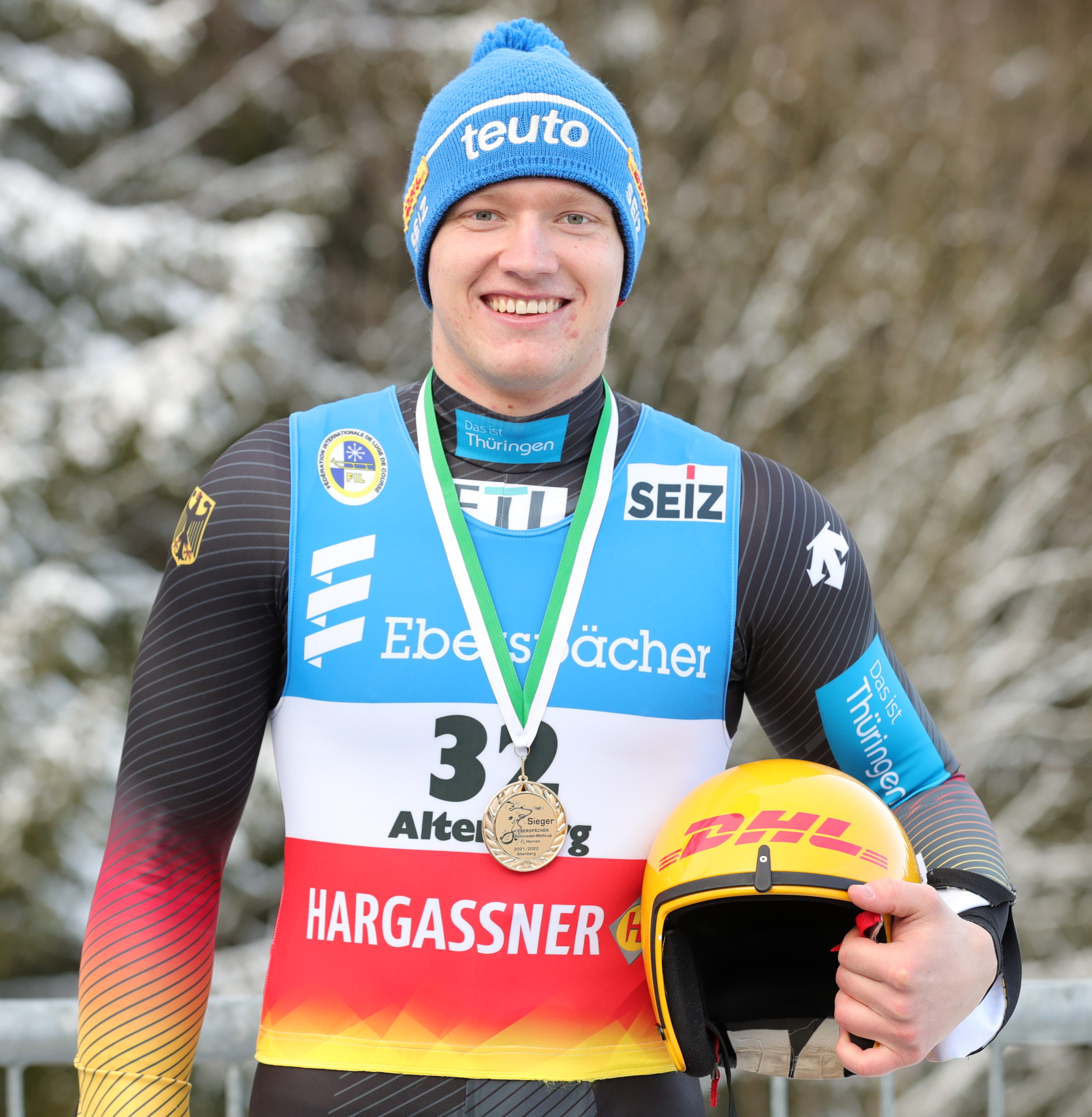
- Max Langenhan in 2021

Personal information
- Born: 21 February 1999 (age 27) Friedrichroda, Germany
- Height: 191 cm (6 ft 3 in)
- Weight: 97 kg (214 lb)

Sport
- Country: Germany
- Sport: Luge
- Event: Singles
- Club: BRC 05 Friedrichroda
Medal record
Men's luge
Representing Germany
Olympic Games
Gold medal – first place	2026 Milano Cortina	Singles
Gold medal – first place	2026 Milano Cortina	Team relay
World Championships
Gold medal – first place	2023 Oberhof	Team relay
Gold medal – first place	2024 Alternberg	Singles
Gold medal – first place	2024 Altenberg	Team relay
Gold medal – first place	2025 Whistler	Singles
Gold medal – first place	2025 Whistler	Mixed singles
Gold medal – first place	2025 Whistler	Team relay
Silver medal – second place	2023 Oberhof	Singles
Silver medal – second place	2024 Alternberg	Sprint
Bronze medal – third place	2023 Oberhof	Sprint
European Championships
Gold medal – first place	2023 Sigulda	Singles
Gold medal – first place	2026 Oberhof	Mixed singles
Silver medal – second place	2023 Sigulda	Team relay
Silver medal – second place	2024 Igls	Team relay
Silver medal – second place	2025 Winterberg	Singles
Silver medal – second place	2025 Winterberg	Team relay
Bronze medal – third place	2024 Igls	Singles
Bronze medal – third place	2026 Oberhof	Singles
Junior World Championships
Gold medal – first place	2018 Altenberg	Singles
Gold medal – first place	2018 Altenberg	Team relay
Gold medal – first place	2019 Innsbruck	Singles
Silver medal – second place	2017 Sigulda	Team relay
Silver medal – second place	2019 Innsbruck	Team relay
Bronze medal – third place	2017 Sigulda	Singles

Max Langenhan (born 21 February 1999) is a German luger who competes for the BRC 05 Friedrichroda club and German national team.

He represented his country at the Winter Olympics in 2022 and 2026, and was Olympic gold medallist in 2026 in the Men's Singles.

== Career ==
=== Youth and Junior career ===
Max Langenhan was successful at national level at early years of his career and made his international debut in January 2015 in the Youth A World Cup. In his debut race in Oberhof, he took second place just behind his compatriot German luger Lucas Geyer. In the next two races of the season, he secured third and second place in Igls and Winterberg, respectively. In just three races he finished seventh overall. In that season, he finished seventh overall after only three races.

In 2015/16 season, Langenhan advanced to the Junior World Cup. After a fall at the start of the season in Lillehammer, he finished third place behind Daniil Lebedev and Jonas Müller on the Sigulda track. He didn't finish on the podium again in the rest of the season, although he never finished worse than eighth place. During the season Langenhan contested first international competitions. At the 2016 European Junior Championships he finished fifth in Altenberg and sixth at the 2016 World Junior Championships in Winterberg. In the overall ranking of the Junior World Cup, he also finished sixth.

The 2016/17 season was exceptionally successful for Langenhan. He won gold medal at the 2017 Junior European Championships in singles discipline and also won the gold medal with Jessica Tiebel and the doubles Hannes Orlamünder and Paul Gubitz in the team relay race. At the 2017 Junior World Championships in Sigulda, where Langenhan won the bronze medal behind Kristers Aparjods and Nico Gleirscher. In addition, he also took silver medal with Tiebel and Orlamünder/Gubitz in the team relay behind the representative from Russia.

The 2017/18 season was Langenhan's last at junior level. He won all the races he competed for including the two races in Oberhof, the race at Königssee, two races in Igls and in Winterberg. In Igls and in Winterberg he also won with the German team relay, which included Cheyenne Rosenthal and Orlamünder/Gubitz in Igls, Rosenthal in Winterberg as well as Hendrik Seibert and Calvin Luke Meister. The races in Winterberg were also the Junior European Championships 2018. At the 2018 Junior World Championships in Altenberg, Langenhan won the title in the singles ahead of his compatriots David Nößler, Paul-Lukas Heider and Moritz Bollmann. He also won the team relay title with Tiebel and Orlamünder/Gubitz.

=== Senior career ===
In 2018-19 season, he promoted to the World cup team after Andi Langenhan, who is not related to Max, resigned and Ralf Palik's retirement. He finished 12th place in his debut World Cup race in Innsbruck. During the season, Langenhan competed in Igls for the last time at the Junior World Championships. On the Innsbruck track he defended his title from last year in front of Bastian Schulte and Lukas Gufler in singles discipline and won the silver medal behind Austria in the team relay race with Cheyenne Rosenthal, and doubles Hannes Orlamünder/Paul Gubitz. In Oberhof, he returned to the World Cup in 22nd place after missing the Altenberg race due to the Junior World Championships. He finished eighth in the overall Sprint World Cup standings and 17th in the overall World Cup standings with 300 points.

The 2020 European Championships held in Lillehammer, where he finished 11th place. In the overall World Cup standings, Langenhan finished ninth with 462 points in the 2019-20 season.

In the 2020-21 season, he achieved his first ever podium finish in singles race on the Altenberg track. At the sprint race in Winterberg he celebrated the first World Cup victory of his career. At the 2021 Luge World Championships in Königssee, he just missed the podium with fourth place. In the overall World Cup rankings, he achieved fourth place thus the best position in his career so far.

The 2021/22 season started with the German Championships in Altenberg, where Langenhan won the silver medal in the singles. With the team relay around Cheyenne Rosenthal and Robin Geueke as well as David Gamm he also achieved the bronze medal. At the first World Cup race on the Olympic track in Beijing, he finished on the podium for the third time in his career behind a German lugers Johannes Ludwig and Felix Loch.

At the 2023 Luge World Championships in Oberhof, Langenhan won the team relay title with Anna Berreiter and doubles Benecken/Eggert, silver medal in the individual race and bronze in the sprint competition.

Langerhan started off the 2023-24 Luge World Cup season by winning its first race in Lake Placid.

He competed at the 2024 FIL World Luge Championships and won gold medals in the singles and the team relay events, and a silver medal in the sprint event.

== Luge results ==
=== Olympic Games ===
Event	Age	Singles	Team relay
(Italy) 2026 Milano Cortina	26	Gold	Gold

=== World Championships ===
- 9 medals – (6 gold, 2 silver, 1 bronze)

Year	Age	Singles	Sprint	Team relay	Mixed singles
(Russia) 2020 Sochi	20	21st	23rd	—	—N/a
(Germany) 2021 Königssee	21	4th	6th	—	—N/a
(Germany) 2023 Oberhof	23	Silver	Bronze	Gold	—N/a
(Germany) 2024 Altenberg	24	Gold	Silver	Gold	—N/a
(Canada) 2025 Whistler	25	Gold	—N/a	Gold	Gold

=== World Cup ===
Season	Singles									Sprint			Team relay						Points	Overall	Singles	Sprint
Season	1	2	3	4	5	6	7	8	9	1	2	3	1	2	3	4	5	6	Points	Overall	Singles	Sprint
2018–19	12	–	16	14	15	15	–	22	10	6	14	13	–	–	–	–	–	–	—N/a	17th	8th	—N/a
2019–20	12	9	11	6	12	11	12	7	7	10	8	9	–	–	–	–	–	–	462	9th	4th	—N/a
2020–21	11	2	9	11	7	10	5	8	2	11	1	5	–	–	–	–	–	CNX	637	4th	5th	4th
2021–22	3	4	7	1	–	10	7	2	7	4	–	8	–	–	1	–	–	–	599	7th	5th	13th
2022–23	–	–	–	2	1	1	1	1	1	–	–	1	–	–	2	2	1	2	685	3rd	3rd	11
