= Anton Dukach =

Ukrainian luger (born 1995)

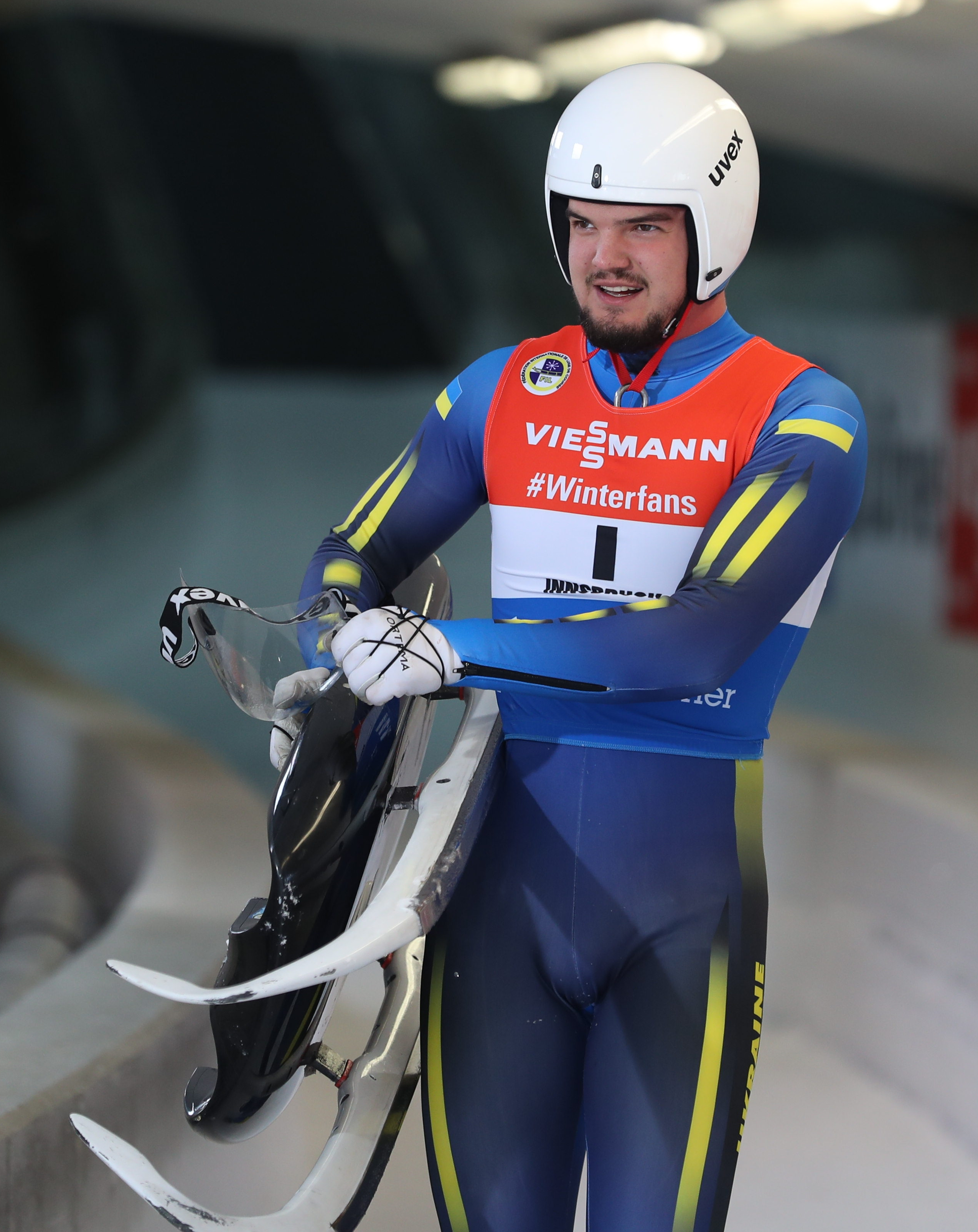
- Dukach in 2018

Personal information
- Full name: Anton Olehovych Dukach
- Nationality: Ukrainian
- Born: 30 July 1995 (age 30) Lviv, Ukraine
- Height: 1.90 m (6 ft 3 in)
- Weight: 99 kg (218 lb)

Sport
- Country: Ukraine
- Sport: Luge
- Event: Men's singles

Anton Olehovych Dukach (Ukrainian: Антон Олегович Дукач, born 30 July 1995) is a Ukrainian luger and a three-time Olympian (2018, 2022, and 2026).

== Career ==
At the 2012 Winter Youth Olympics in Innsbruck, Austria, Anton Dukach finished 4th in boys' singles, having lost 0.022 seconds to a German athlete who was third. He was 7th in the team relay (together with Stetskiv, Buryy, and Lehedza). He was also the flagbearer of Ukraine at the Games.

Dukach's first World Cup season was the 2012–13 season. As of December 2025, Dukach's best Luge World Cup finish was 7th in the 2023–24 season in Sigulda, Latvia, in both singles races on 25 February and 3 March 2024.

Dukach participated in several World Championships, with his best personal result being 12th in 2024.

On 27 December 2017, Dukach qualified for the 2018 Winter Olympics. At the Olympics, he finished 23rd in the singles' race and 13th in the team relay (together with Shkhumova, Obolonchyk, and Zakharkiv).

In 2022, Anton Dukach was nominated for his second Winter Games in Beijing. In the singles event, he finished 22nd and didn't qualify for the fourth run due to poor performance in the first run after falling off on the final curve. Dukach was included in the relay team, where Ukraine (Tunytska, Dukach, Stakhiv and Lysetskyi) finished 11th.

In January 2025, Dukach achieved his first win in a Nations Cup race.

== Personal life ==
Dukach studied computer security at Lviv Polytechnic. He also studied Lviv State University of Physical Culture.

== Career results ==
=== Winter Olympics ===
Year	Event	Singles	Relay
2018	Pyeongchang, South Korea	23	13
2022	Beijing, China	22	11
2026	(Italy) Milano Cortina	16	—

=== World Championships ===
Year	Event	Singles	Relay	Singles Sprint	Mixed Singles
2016	Königssee, Germany	30	13	28	—N/a
2019	Winterberg, Germany	22	9	24	—N/a
2021	Königssee, Germany	20	7	24	—N/a
2023	Oberhof, Germany	16	—	25	—N/a
2024	Altenberg, Germany	12	8	20	—N/a
2025	Whistler, Canada	16	—	—N/a	13

=== European Championships ===
Year	Event	Singles	Relay	Mixed Singles
2016	Altenberg, Germany	21	DNF	—N/a
2018	Sigulda, Latvia	23	—	—N/a
2019	Oberhof, Germany	DNF	7	—N/a
2020	Lillehammer, Norway	26	8	—N/a
2021	Sigulda, Latvia	19	—	—N/a
2022	St. Moritz, Switzerland	17	5	—N/a
2023	Sigulda, Latvia	9	—	—N/a
2024	Igls, Austria	16	—	—N/a
2025	Winterberg, Germany	8	6	—N/a
2026	Oberhof, Germany	15	—	DSQ

=== Luge World Cup ===
==== Rankings ====
Season	Singles	Singles Sprint	Overall
2012–13	55	—N/a	
2013–14	58	—N/a	
2014–15	47	—N/a	
2015–16	33		—N/a
2017–18	41		—N/a
2018–19	33		—N/a
2019–20	29		—N/a
2020–21	23		25
2021–22	24		28
2022–23	27		28
2023–24	13	13	13
2024–25	13	—N/a	
2025–26	13	—N/a	
