= Riks Rozītis =

Latvian luger (born 1994)

Riks Kristens Rozītis (born 4 July 1994) is a Latvian luger.

He competed at the 2012 Winter Youth Olympics, the European Championships in 2017, 2019, 2020 and 2021 and the World Championships in 2015 (singles and relay), 2016 (singles and sprint), 2017 (singles and sprint), 2019 (singles and sprint), 2020 (singles and sprint) and 2021 (singles and sprint). Altogether, his highest placement was an 8th place at the 2017 World Championships sprint.
