= Gerhard Gleirscher =

Austrian luger (born 1969)

Medal record

Luge

Representing Austria

World Championships
Gold medal – first place	1997 Igls	Mixed team
Silver medal – second place	1991 Winterberg	Mixed team
Bronze medal – third place	1997 Igls	Men's singles

Gerhard Gleirscher (born 14 December 1969) is an Austrian luger who competed from 1990 to 2000. He won a complete set of medals at the FIL World Luge Championships with a gold in mixed team (1997), a silver in mixed team (1991) and a bronze in men's singles (1997).

Competing in three Winter Olympics, Gleirscher also finished seventh in the men's doubles event in 1992 and in the men's singles event both in 1994 and in 1998.

His best overall finish in the Luge World Cup was third in the men's singles in 1997-8.

== Family ==
Gerhard Gleirscher's son, David, won a gold medal at the men's singles luge event at the 2018 Winter Olympics. His younger son Nico Gleirscher is also a luger competing for Austria. Nico placed third in the sprint event at Winterberg during the 2017-18 Luge World Cup.
