= Roman Repilov =

Russian luger (born 1996)

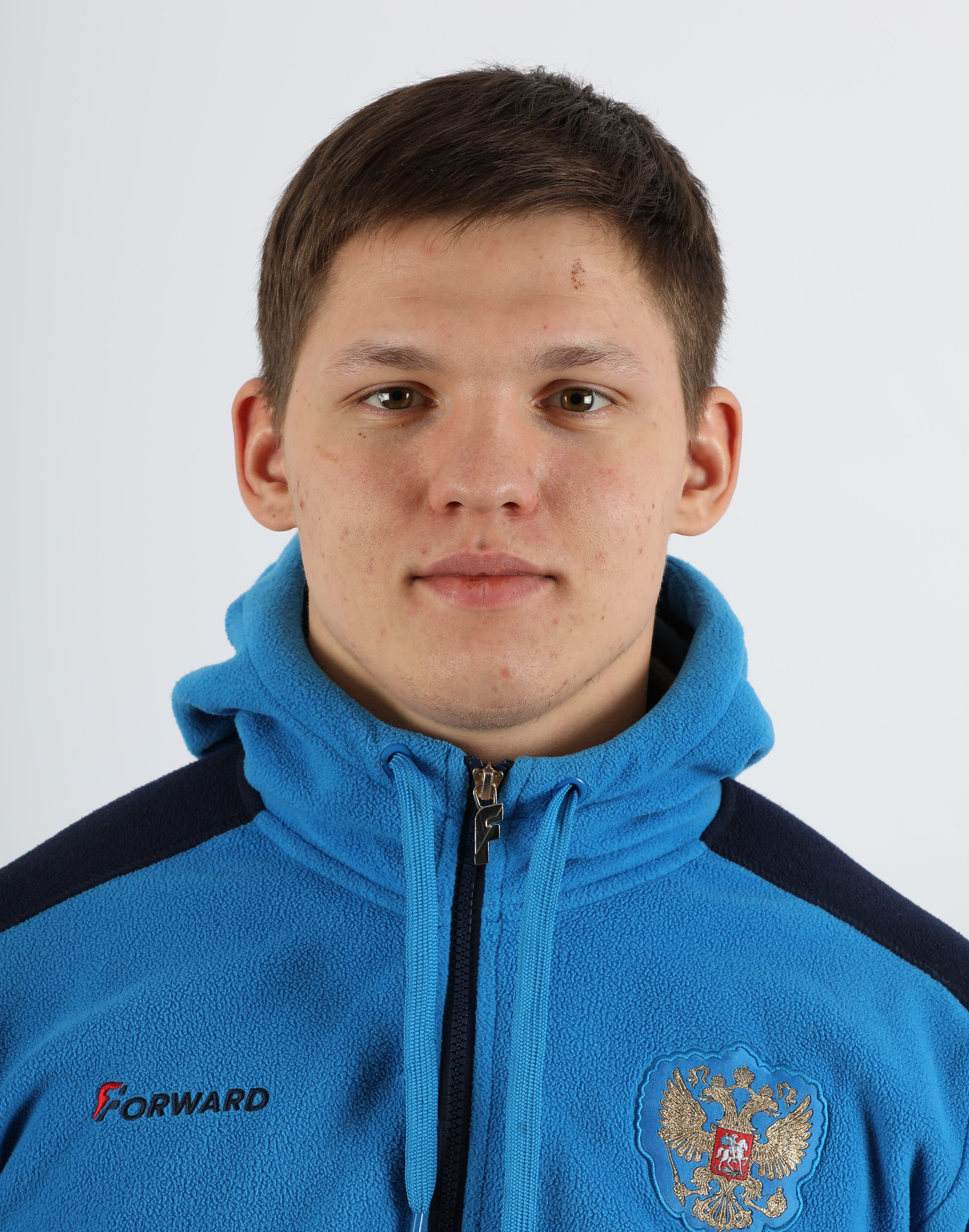
- Repilov in 2018

Personal information
- Full name: Roman Alexandrovich Repilov
- Nationality: Russian
- Born: 5 March 1996 (age 30) Dmitrov, Moscow Oblast, Russia
- Height: 1.85 m (6 ft 1 in)
- Weight: 90 kg (198 lb)

Sport
- Country: Russia
- Sport: Luge
- Event: Singles
Medal record
Men's luge
Representing Russia
World Championships
| Gold medal – first place | 2020 Sochi | Singles |
| Gold medal – first place | 2020 Sochi | Sprint |
| Silver medal – second place | 2017 Igls | Singles |
| Silver medal – second place | 2017 Igls | Sprint |
| Bronze medal – third place | 2017 Igls | Team relay |
European Championships
| Silver medal – second place | 2016 Altenberg | Singles |
| Silver medal – second place | 2019 Oberhof | Singles |
| Bronze medal – third place | 2016 Altenberg | Team relay |
| Bronze medal – third place | 2018 Sigulda | Singles |
| Bronze medal – third place | 2020 Lillehammer | Singles |
| Bronze medal – third place | 2022 St. Moritz | Team relay |
Representing Russian Luge Federation
World Championships
| Gold medal – first place | 2021 Königssee | Singles |

Roman Alexandrovich Repilov (Russian: Роман Александрович Репилов; born 5 March 1996) is a Russian luger.

== Competitive career ==
Representing Russia at the 2015–16 Luge World Cup, Repilov placed second in the sprint event in Calgary with a time of 30.279. On 2 December 2016, he came in fifth in the Lake Placid event of the Men's Singles 2016-17 Luge World Cup, but set a new Lake Placid track start record of 6.359 seconds. Later in the same season, he triumphed in the men's singles event at Park City, Utah, came in second twice, in Winterberg, Germany and Sigulda, Latvia and won two men's singles sprint events in Park City and Sigulda.

During the 2017–18 Luge World Cup season Repilov triumphed at Lake Placid and in doing so shattered the track record which had just been set first by his teammate Semen Pavlichenko the previous day and again by the American slider Tucker West in the previous heat of the finals, with a time of 50.875 seconds. Repilov was joined on the podium by Pavlichenko, who took the silver, and West, who took home the bronze. Also during the 2017–18 campaign he won a silver at Altenberg and a bronze at Calgary.

During the 2018–19 Luge World Cup Repilov achieved back to back podium finishes first in placing second in Calgary in the men's singles and then in Lake Placid in successfully defending his 2017–18 triumph there in the men's singles event and also claiming victory in the men's sprint singles event.

Repilov currently resides in Dmitrov. He has a younger brother, Pavel, who is currently competing on youth events.

== World Cup podiums ==
| Season | Date | Location | Discipline | Place |
|---|---|---|---|---|
| 2015–16 | 19 December 2015 | Calgary, Canada | Singles | 2nd |
| 2015–16 | 14 February 2016 | Altenberg, Germany | Singles | 2nd |
| 2016–17 | 26 November 2016 | Winterberg, Germany | Singles | 2nd |
| 2016–17 | 16 December 2016 | Park City, United States | Singles | 1st |
| 2016–17 | 17 December 2016 | Park City, United States | Singles (sprint) | 2nd |
| 2016–17 | 15 January 2017 | Sigulda, Latvia | Singles | 2nd |
| 2016–17 | 15 January 2017 | Sigulda, Latvia | Singles (sprint) | 1st |
| 2016–17 | 4 February 2017 | (Germany) Oberhof | Singles | 2nd |
| 2016–17 | 5 February 2017 | (Germany) Oberhof | Mixed Relay | 2nd |
| 2016–17 | 26 February 2017 | Altenberg, Germany | Singles | 1st |
| 2016–17 | 26 February 2017 | Altenberg, Germany | Mixed relay | 3rd |
| 2017–18 | 3 December 2017 | Altenberg, Germany | Singles | 2nd |
| 2017–18 | 9 December 2017 | Calgary, Canada | Singles | 3rd |
| 2017–18 | 16 December 2017 | Lake Placid, United States | Singles | 1st |
| 2017–18 | 21 January 2018 | Lillehammer, Norway | Singles | 2nd |
| 2017–18 | 28 January 2018 | Sigulda, Latvia | Singles | 3rd |
| 2017–18 | 28 January 2018 | Sigulda, Latvia | Singles (sprint) | 1st |
| 2018–19 | 8 December 2018 | Calgary, Canada | Singles | 2nd |
| 2018–19 | 15 December 2018 | Lake Placid, United States | Singles | 1st |
| 2018–19 | 16 December 2018 | Lake Placid, United States | Singles (sprint) | 1st |
| 2018–19 | 9 February 2019 | Oberhof, Germany | Singles | 2nd |
| 2018–19 | 24 February 2019 | Sochi, Russia | Singles | 2nd |
| 2018–19 | 24 February 2019 | Sochi, Russia | Singles (sprint) | 2nd |
| 2019–20 | 24 November 2019 | Innsbruck, Austria | Singles | 2nd |
| 2019–20 | 1 December 2019 | Lake Placid, United States | Singles (sprint) | 1st |
| 2019–20 | 13 December 2019 | Whistler, Canada | Singles | 1st |
| 2019–20 | 14 December 2019 | Whistler, Canada | Singles (sprint) | 2nd |
| 2019–20 | 19 January 2020 | Lillehammer, Norway | Singles | 3rd |
| 2019–20 | 26 January 2020 | Sigulda, Latvia | Singles | 2nd |
| 2019–20 | 1 March 2020 | Königssee, Germany | Singles | 3rd |
| 2020–21 | 2 January 2021 | Königssee, Germany | Singles | 2nd |
| 2020–21 | 3 January 2021 | Königssee, Germany | Team Relay | 3rd |

=== Season titles ===
- 5 titles – (2 Singles, 3 Sprint singles)

| Season | Discipline |
|---|---|
| 2017 | Sprint singles |
| 2017 | Singles |
| 2019 | Sprint singles |
| 2020 | Sprint singles |
| 2020 | Singles |
