= Danyil Martsinovskyi =

Ukrainian luger (born 2004)

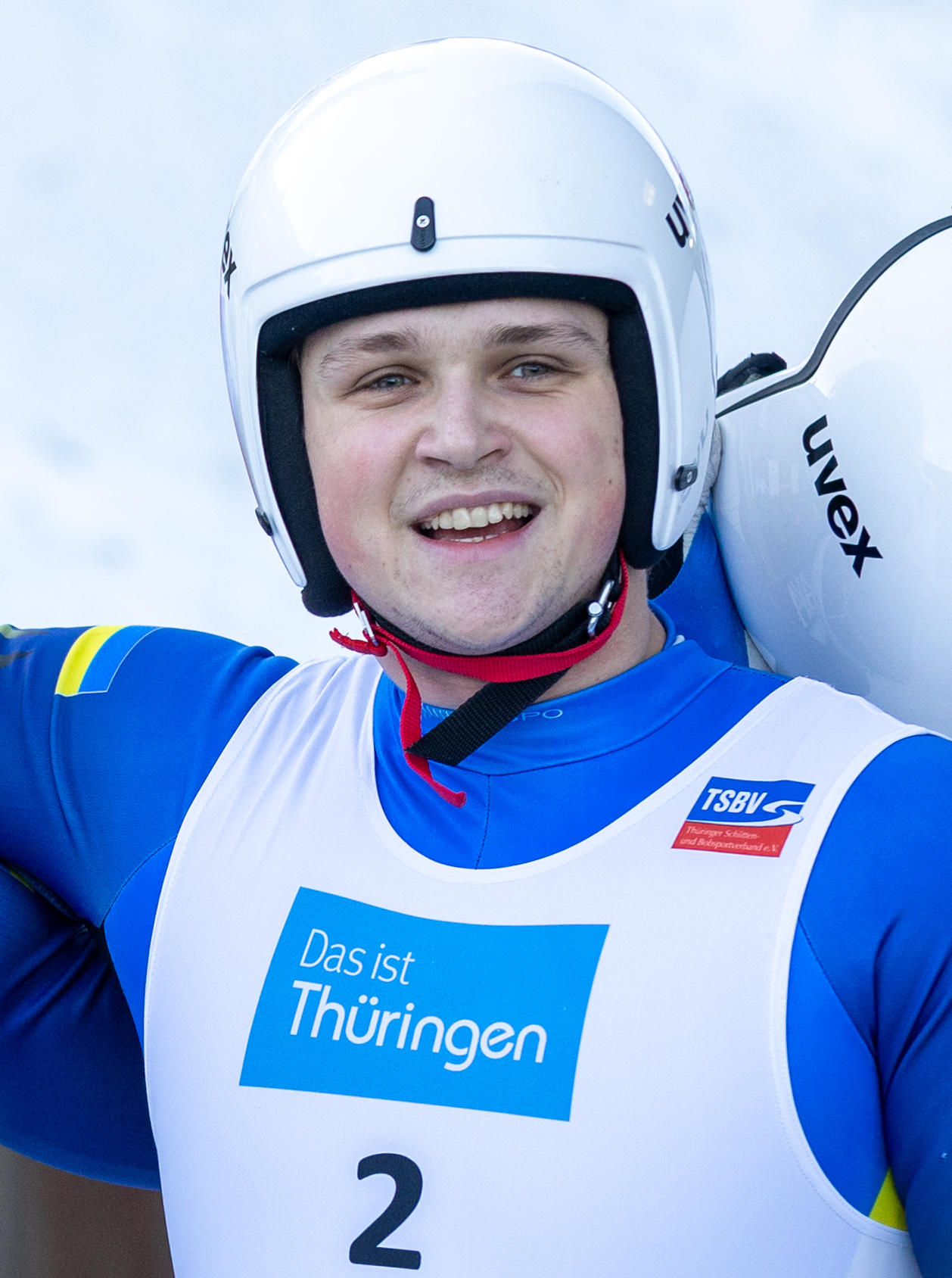
- Martsinovskyi in January 2026 in Oberhof

Personal information
- Native name: Даниїл Русланович Марціновський
- Full name: Danyil Ruslanovych Martsinovskyi
- Born: 30 December 2004 (age 21) Lviv, Ukraine

Sport
- Country: Ukraine
- Sport: Luge
- Events: Men's singles, Men's doubles

Danyil Ruslanovych Martsinovskyi (Ukrainian: Даниїл Русланович Марціновський; born 30 December 2004) is a Ukrainian luger. A Master of Sport of Ukraine, he competed at the 2026 Winter Olympics in the men's doubles event.

== Career ==
Martsinovskyi began his senior international career as a singles slider, competing at multiple Luge World Cup seasons as well as the FIL World Luge Championships in 2023 in Oberhof, Germany, and 2024 in Altenberg, Germany, as well as the FIL European Luge Championships in 2024 in Igls, Austria, and 2025 in Winterberg, Germany.

Ahead of the 2025–26 season, Martsinovskyi switched to doubles, partnering with fellow Ukrainian Bohdan Babura. The pair won a bronze medal at a Nations Cup event in Oberhof in January 2026 and a silver medal in the men's doubles U23 event at the 2026 European Championships in Oberhof. Martsinovskyi and Babura went on to earn one of Ukraine's Olympic luge quotas, going to the 2026 Winter Olympics in Milan–Cortina, Italy, where they finished 16th in the men's doubles event.

== Career results ==
=== Winter Olympics ===
Year	Event	Doubles
2026	Milan–Cortina, Italy	16

=== World Championships (singles) ===
Year	Event	Singles
2023	Oberhof, Germany	24
2024	Altenberg, Germany	23

=== European Championships ===
Year	Event	Singles	Doubles
2024	Igls, Austria	24	—N/a
2025	Winterberg, Germany	23	—N/a
2026	Oberhof, Germany	—N/a	12

=== Luge World Cup ===
==== Rankings ====
Season	Singles	Singles Sprint	Singles Overall	Doubles	Doubles Sprint	Doubles Overall
2021–22	43	—	44	—	—	—
2022–23	Missed the season					
2023–24	30	—	30	—	—	—
2024–25	28	—N/a	—N/a	—	—N/a	—N/a
2025–26	—	—N/a	—N/a	16	—N/a	—N/a

== Personal life ==
Martsinovskyi lives in Lviv, Ukraine. He studied at the Lviv State University of Physical Culture.
