= Chris Mazdzer =

American luger (born 1988)

Chris Mazdzer OLY
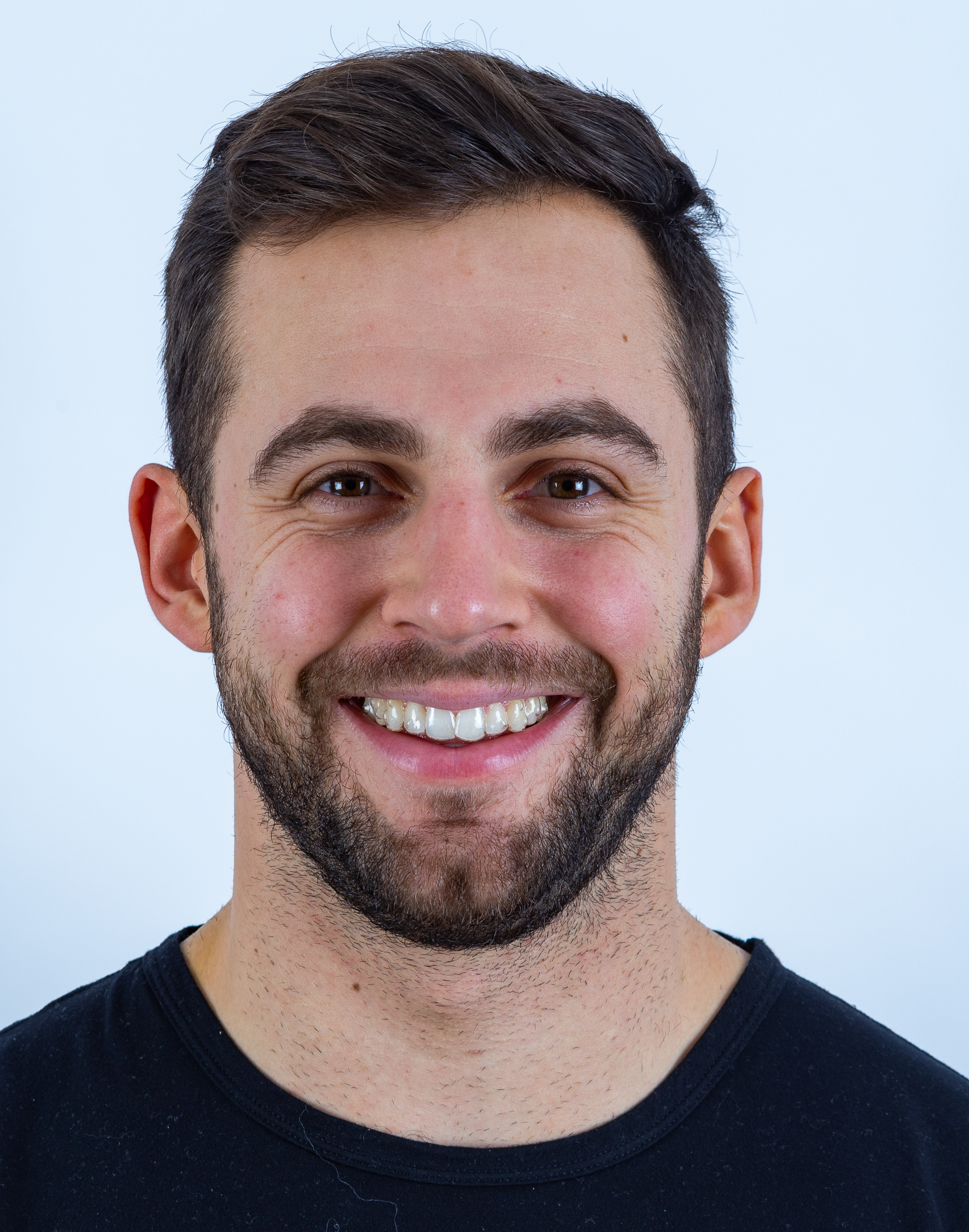
- Mazdzer in 2018

Personal information
- Full name: Christopher Mazdzer
- Born: June 26, 1988 (age 38) Pittsfield, Massachusetts, U.S.
- Height: 6 ft 1 in (185 cm)
- Weight: 190 lb (86 kg)
- Spouse: Mara Marian (m. 2020)
- Children: 2

Sport
- Country: United States
- Sport: Luge
- Event: Doubles
Medal record
Men's luge
Representing the United States
Olympic Games
Silver medal – second place	2018 Pyeongchang	Singles
World Championships
Bronze medal – third place	2020 Sochi	Mixed team

Christopher Mazdzer (/ˈmæzdər/; born June 26, 1988) is an American retired luger. At the 2018 Winter Olympics, he won the silver medal in the men's single luge, becoming the first non-European medalist in that event. He competed at the 2010 Winter Olympics in Vancouver and the 2014 Winter Olympics in Sochi, finishing 13th on both occasions. Mazdzer announced his retirement from luge on December 4, 2023 on Instagram.

== Career ==
=== Luge ===
On December 4, 2015, Mazdzer won the 2015–16 Luge World Cup Men's singles event at Lake Placid in the first-ever one-two finish for the United States in a men's singles luge World Cup event, with the 2014–15 winner and track record holder, Tucker West, coming in second. Until his 2015 win, Mazdzer's best finish at the FIL World Luge Championships was sixth in the singles at Whistler, British Columbia, in 2013. His best World Cup season finish was 13th in 2012–13. In December 2014, he won the men's singles event in the luge sprint in the second ever to be held and to be competed in event at the World Cup level in the discipline. Mazdzer was therein victorious at the FIL "Sprint" World Cup event at the Calgary track.

On February 11, 2018, Mazdzer won a silver medal in men's singles at the 2018 Winter Olympics in Pyeongchang.

Mazdzer finished 8th in men's singles at the 2022 Winter Olympics in Beijing.

Mazdzer announced his retirement from luge in December 2023, stating that he wanted to spend more time with his family.

=== Dancing with the Stars ===
In April 2018, Mazdzer was announced as one of the celebrities for season 26 of Dancing with the Stars. He was partnered with professional dancer Witney Carson. He was eliminated in the third week of the four-week season, placing fourth in the competition.

=== American Ninja Warrior ===
Mazdzer competed on American Ninja Warrior season 16. He appeared in the 4th episode and fell on the second obstacle of the qualifiers, eliminating him from the competition.

The episode aired July 8, 2024. During the episode the announcers claimed that Mazdzer intended on competing in the 2026 Winter Olympics but this was outdated information as the episode was filmed in March 2023, before Mazdzer announced his retirement.

== Personal life ==
Though he was not born in Saranac Lake, Mazdzer has made Saranac Lake, New York his hometown. Mazdzer met his Romanian-born wife, Mara, in the summer of 2017 and they became engaged in October 2019; they were married in Salt Lake City, Utah, on May 19, 2020. They have two children together Nico (born 2021) and Aleksander (born 2024)
