= Timon Grancagnolo =

German luger (born 2003)

- Grancagnolo in 2026

Personal information
- Nationality: German
- Born: 4 April 2003 (age 23) Chemnitz, Germany

Sport
- Sport: Luge
- Event: Singles
Medal record
Men's luge
Representing Germany
Winter Youth Olympics
Silver medal – second place	2020 Lausanne	Team
Bronze medal – third place	2020 Lausanne	Singles

Timon Grancagnolo (born 4 April 2003) is a German luger of Sicilian ancestry.

== Career ==
Grancagnolo represented Germany at the 2020 Winter Youth Olympics and won a silver medal in the team relay and a bronze medal in the singles event.

In January 2026, he was selected to represent Germany at the 2026 Winter Olympics. He competed in the singles event and finished in ninth place with a time of 3:33.942.
