= David Gleirscher =

Austrian luger (born 1994)

- Gleirscher in 2026

Personal information
- Born: 23 July 1994 (age 32) Hall in Tirol, Austria
- Height: 1.83 m (6 ft 0 in)
- Weight: 90 kg (198 lb)

Sport
- Country: Austria
- Sport: Luge
- Event: Singles
Medal record
Men's luge
Representing Austria
Olympic Games
| Gold medal – first place | 2018 Pyeongchang | Singles |
| Bronze medal – third place | 2018 Pyeongchang | Mixed team |
World Championships
| Gold medal – first place | 2021 Königssee | Mixed team |
| Gold medal – first place | 2024 Alternberg | Sprint |
| Silver medal – second place | 2020 Sochi | Sprint |
| Bronze medal – third place | 2021 Königssee | Singles |
| Bronze medal – third place | 2021 Königssee | Sprint |
| Bronze medal – third place | 2023 Oberhof | Singles |
| Bronze medal – third place | 2025 Whistler | Mixed singles |
European Championships
| Gold medal – first place | 2020 Lillehammer | Mixed team |

David Gleirscher (born 23 July 1994) is an Austrian luger. He competed for Austria in the 2015–16 Luge World Cup in the men's singles and finished tenth in the points standings. In men's luge at the 2018 Winter Olympics he became a surprise champion after the favorite, Felix Loch, made a mistake in the last run and dropped out of the medals. Before the Olympic win, Gleirscher did not have a single World Cup podium appearance.

== Family ==
David Gleirscher's father, Gerhard, is a retired luger who won three world championship medals, including both gold in the team event and a bronze in the men's single event in 1997. His father also competed in three Winter Olympics, finish seventh in each Olympics (Singles: 1994, 1998; Doubles: 1992).

His younger brother Nico Gleirscher is also a luger competing for Austria. Nico placed third in the sprint event at Winterberg during the 2017-18 Luge World Cup.

Gleirscher did not qualify for the 2026 Olympics.
