= Jonas Müller (luger) =

Austrian luger (born 1997)

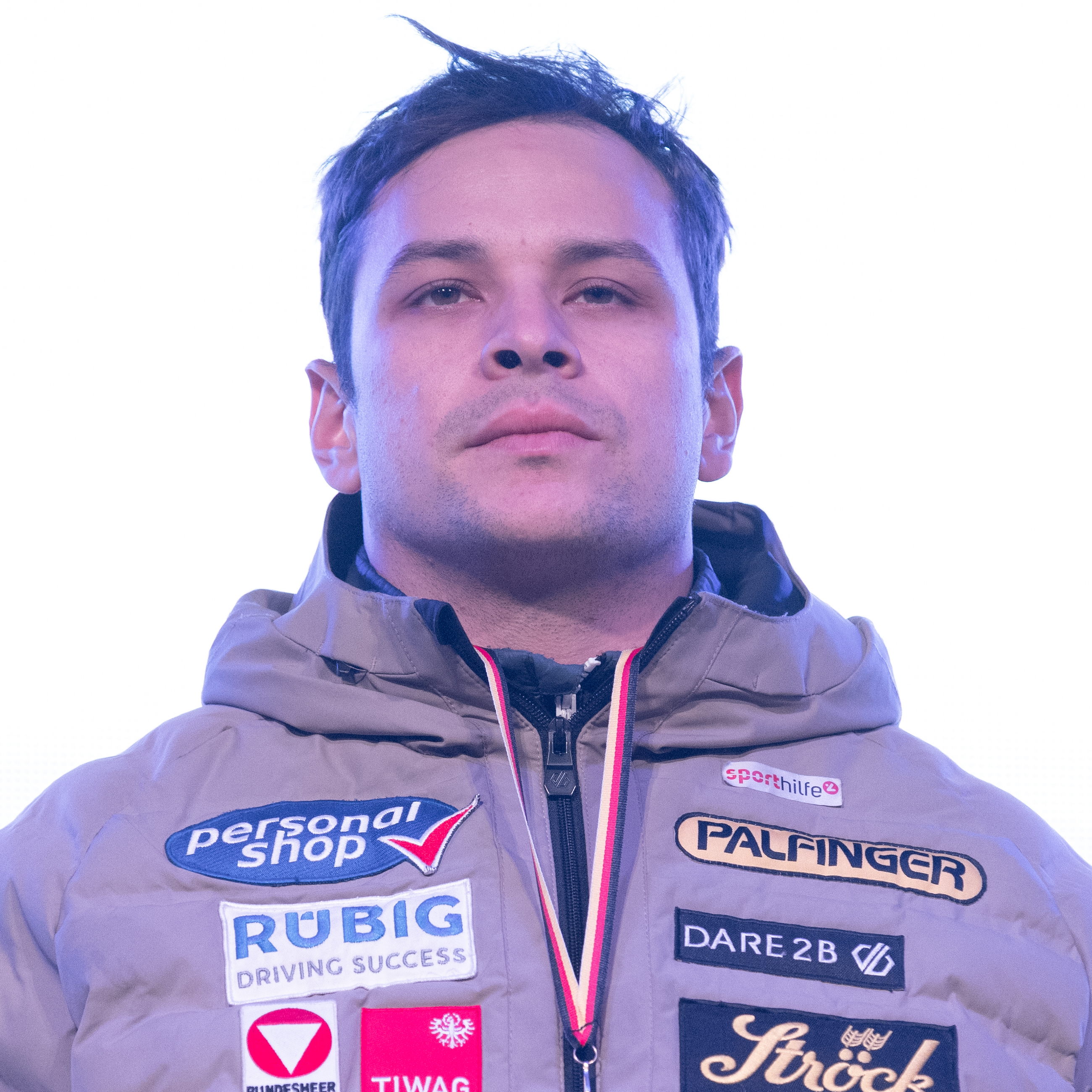
- Müller in 2026

Personal information
- Nationality: Austrian
- Born: 4 October 1997 (age 28) Bludenz, Austria
- Height: 1.86 m (6 ft 1 in)
- Weight: 95 kg (209 lb)

Sport
- Country: Austria
- Sport: Luge
- Event: Singles
Medal record
Men's luge
Representing Austria
Olympic Games
Silver medal – second place	2026 Milano Cortina	Singles
Silver medal – second place	2026 Milano Cortina	Team relay
World Championships
Gold medal – first place	2019 Winterberg	Sprint
Gold medal – first place	2023 Oberhof	Singles
Silver medal – second place	2020 Sochi	Singles
Silver medal – second place	2023 Oberhof	Sprint
Silver medal – second place	2023 Oberhof	Team relay
European Championships
Gold medal – first place	2024 Igls	Singles
Gold medal – first place	2024 Igls	Team relay
Gold medal – first place	2025 Winterberg	Singles
Gold medal – first place	2025 Winterberg	Team relay
Gold medal – first place	2026 Oberhof	Singles
Silver medal – second place	2026 Oberhof	Team relay
Bronze medal – third place	2026 Oberhof	Mixed singles

Jonas Müller (born 4 October 1997) is an Austrian luger.

He is a silver medalist in Men's singles at the 2026 Winter Olympics.

== Career ==
He participated at the 2019 FIL World Luge Championships, winning the gold medal in the sprint.

On 24 November 2019 Muller won the opening men's luge singles event of the FIL 2019-20 Luge World Cup season in Innsbruck. The next week in the next luge world cup event at Lake Placid Muller again took first place in the men's singles event and remained the World Cup leader.
