= Seiya Kobayashi =

Japanese luger (born 2001)

- Kobayashi in 2026

Personal information
- Born: 11 August 2001 (age 25) Nagano, Japan

Sport
- Country: Japan
- Sport: Luge

Seiya Kobayashi (born 11 August 2001) is a Japanese luger who competes internationally.

He represented Japan at the 2022 and 2026 Winter Olympics.
