= Dominik Fischnaller =

Italian luger (born 1993)

- Fischnaller in 2026

Personal information
- Nationality: Italian
- Born: 20 February 1993 (age 33) Brixen, Italy
- Height: 1.73 m (5 ft 8 in)
- Weight: 61 kg (134 lb)

Sport
- Country: Italy
- Sport: Luge
- Event: Singles
Medal record
Men's luge
Representing Italy
Olympic Games
Bronze medal – third place	2022 Beijing	Singles
Bronze medal – third place	2026 Milano Cortina	Singles
Bronze medal – third place	2026 Milano Cortina	Team relay
World Championships
Bronze medal – third place	2017 Igls	Singles
Bronze medal – third place	2017 Igls	Sprint
Bronze medal – third place	2020 Sochi	Sprint
European Championships
Gold medal – first place	2019 Oberhof	Team relay
Gold medal – first place	2020 Lillehammer	Singles
Silver medal – second place	2020 Lillehammer	Team relay
Bronze medal – third place	2014 Sigulda	Singles
Bronze medal – third place	2021 Sigulda	Singles
Bronze medal – third place	2023 Sigulda	Team relay
Bronze medal – third place	2024 Igls	Team relay
Bronze medal – third place	2025 Winterberg	Team relay

Dominik Fischnaller (born 20 February 1993) is an Italian luger. An athlete of the Centro Sportivo Carabinieri, he has won three Olympic bronze medals, three World Championship bronze medals, and was the 2023 Luge World Cup Overall champion in the men's singles.

== Career ==
Fischnaller competed for Italy in the men's singles luge event at the 2014 Winter Olympics in Sochi, placing sixth behind the bronze medal effort of teammate Armin Zöggeler. Four years later, at the 2018 Winter Olympics in Pyeongchang, he came fourth while his cousin Kevin came seventh.

Fischnaller won the bronze medal in the men's singles at the 2022 Winter Olympics in Beijing, becoming the third man to win an olympic medal in luge's singles for Italy after Zöggeler and Paul Hildgartner. The next year, he also managed to win the Overall World Cup, beating German lugers Felix Loch and Max Langenhahn.

At the 2026 Winter Olympics, Fischnaller won another bronze medal in the men's singles. He also won a bronze medal in the team relay.

== Personal life ==
Dominik Fischnaller is the younger brother of Hans Peter Fischnaller and cousin of Kevin Fischnaller. He married American luger Emily Sweeney in May 2025. They both qualified for the 2026 Olympics.
