= Nico Gleirscher =

Austrian luger (born 1997)

- Gleirscher in 2026

Personal information
- Nationality: Austrian
- Born: 17 March 1997 (age 29) Telfes, Austria

Sport
- Country: Austria
- Sport: Luge
- Event: Singles
Medal record
Men's luge
Representing Austria
World Championships
Gold medal – first place	2021 Königssee	Sprint
Silver medal – second place	2024 Alternberg	Singles
Silver medal – second place	2025 Whistler	Team relay
Bronze medal – third place	2025 Whistler	Singles
European Championships
Silver medal – second place	2024 Igls	Singles
Bronze medal – third place	2022 St. Moritz	Singles
Bronze medal – third place	2025 Winterberg	Singles

Nico Gleirscher (born 17 March 1997) is an Austrian luger.

== Career ==
He started competing for the Austria national team in the various youth categories, finishing second overall in the Youth World Cup in 2013/14 and third in the Junior World Cup in 2014/15. He also won four medals at the World Junior Championships, including a silver in singles in Sigulda 2017 and three bronze medals (singles in Lillehammer 2015, team event in Winterberg 2016 and in Sigulda 2017). He also won four medals at the European Junior Championships (one silver and three bronze medals).

He made his World Cup debut in the 2015/16 season, on 29 November 2015, in Igls, finishing the singles event in 19th position. He got his first podium on 26 November 2017 in Winterberg in the single sprint, where he finished third, and his first win on 3 January 2021 in Schönau am Königssee, where he won the team race together with Madeleine Egle, Thomas Steu and Lorenz Koller. Overall, as his best result, he placed 17th in 2017/18.

He is the son of Gerhard and the younger brother of David, who have both been successful elite lugers.

On 29 January 2021, he became the world champion in the sprint classification, ahead of Semen Pavlichenko, and his brother David came third.
