= Alexander Ferlazzo =

Australian luger (born 1995)

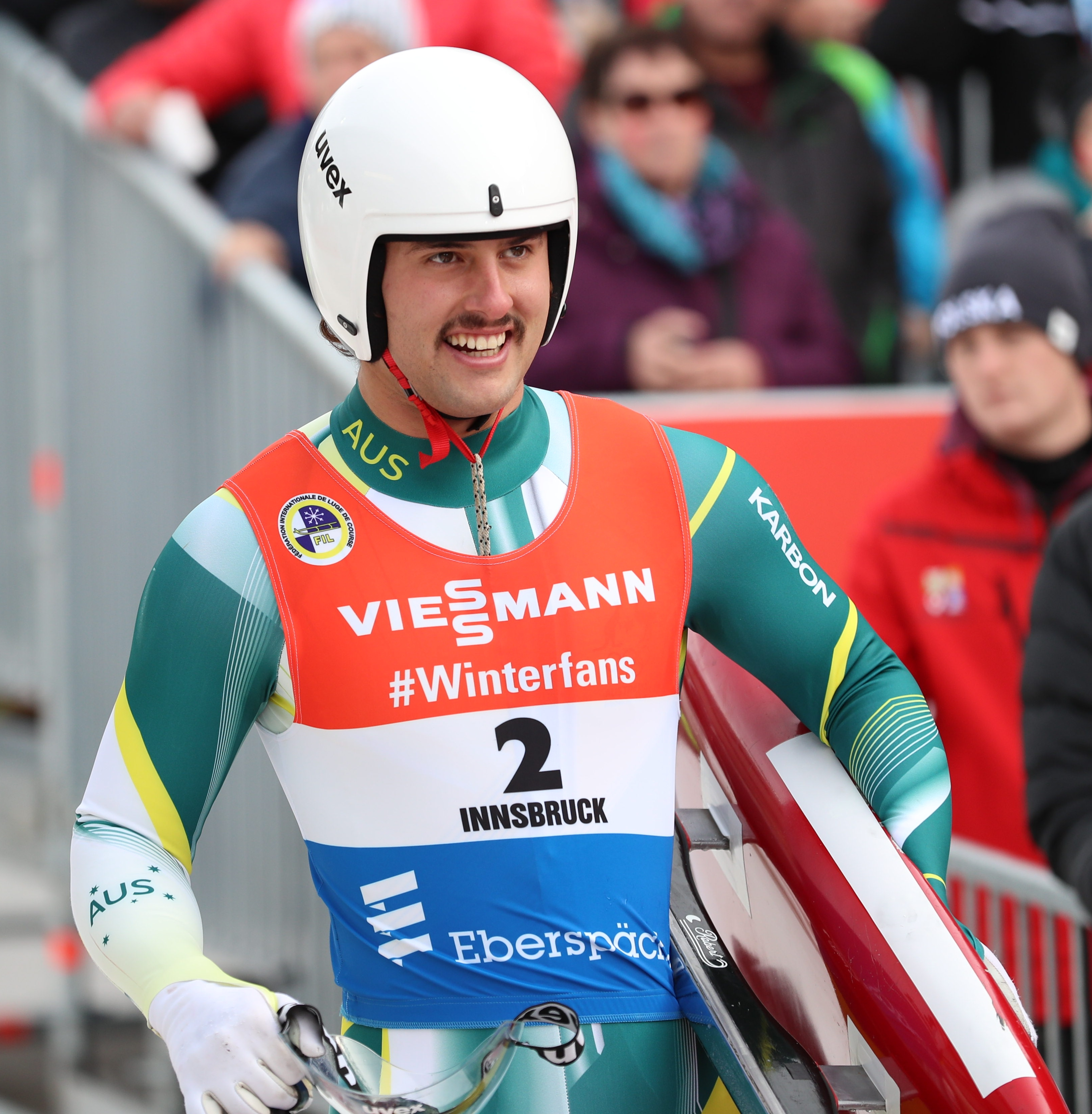
- Ferlazzo in 2018

Personal information
- Full name: Alexander Michael Ferlazzo
- Born: 3 April 1995 (age 31) Townsville, Queensland, Australia
- Height: 185 cm (6 ft 1 in)
- Weight: 75 kg (165 lb)

Sport
- Country: Australia
- Sport: Luge

Alexander Michael Ferlazzo (born 3 April 1995) is an Australian luger who has competed since 2012. He represented Australia at the 2014, 2018, 2022, and 2026 Winter Olympics.

== Career ==
Ferlazzo competed in the first-ever Youth Olympics in Innsbruck, Austria, where he finished 19th out of 25th. Ferlazzo also competed for Australia at the 2014 Winter Olympics in Sochi, Russia. He finished 33rd in the men's single competition, 6.518 seconds behind gold medal winner Felix Loch.

== Personal life ==
Born in Australia, Ferlazzo is of Italian descent.
