= Jonathan Gustafson =

American luger (born 1997)

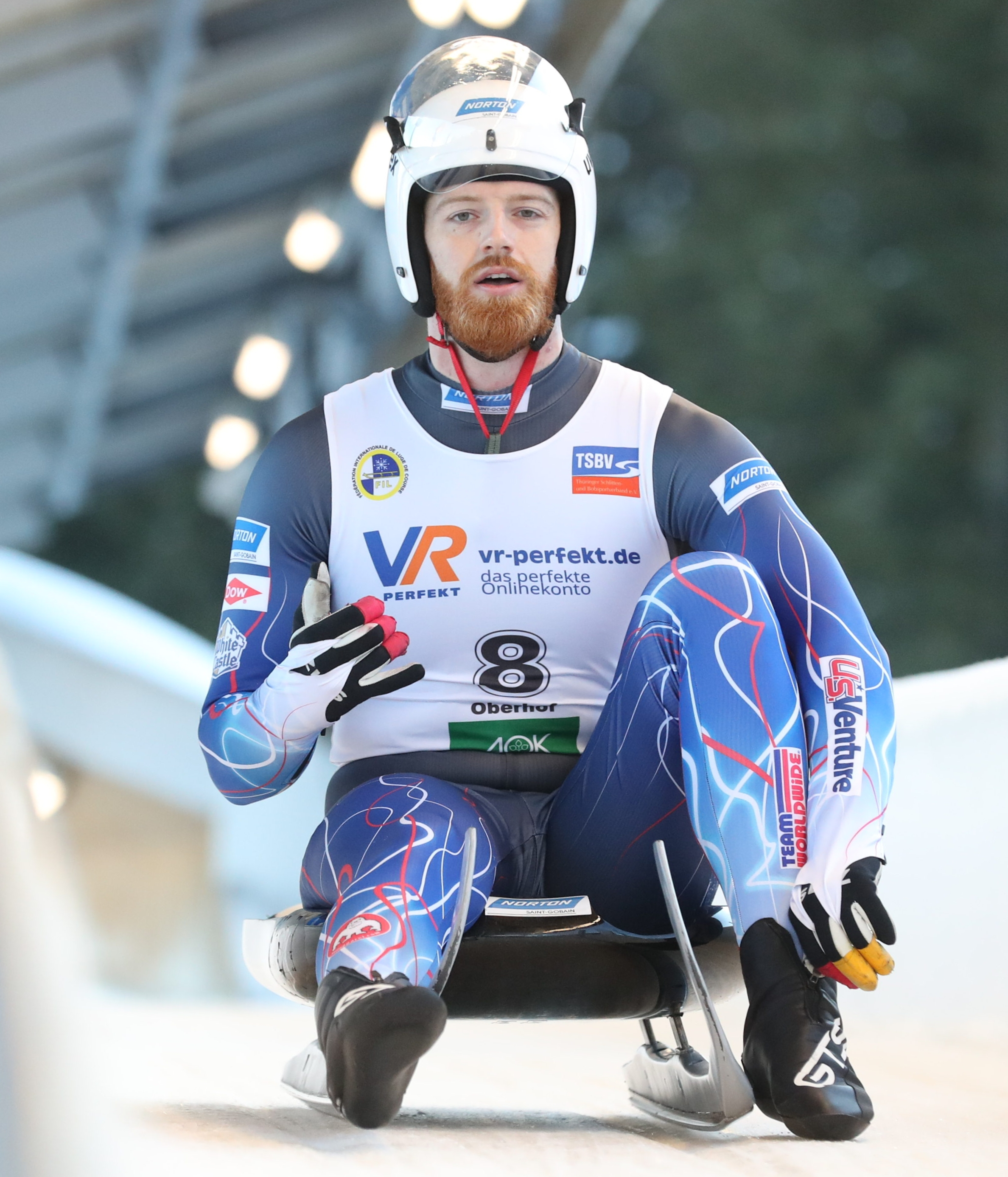
- Gustafson in 2022

Personal information
- Nickname: Jonny
- Born: March 5, 1997 (age 29) Saranac Lake, New York, U.S.
- Home town: Massena, New York, U.S.

Sport
- Country: United States
- Sport: Luge
Medal record
Men's luge
Representing the United States
World Championships
Silver medal – second place	2025 Whistler	Mixed singles

Jonathan "Jonny" Gustafson (born March 5, 1997) is an American luger who competes internationally.

He represented his country in the men's singles event at the 2022 Winter Olympics where he placed 19th.

Gustafson finished 11th in the men's singles event at the 2026 Winter Olympics.
