= Kristers Aparjods =

Latvian luger (born 1998)

- Aparjods in 2026

Personal information
- Nationality: Latvian
- Born: 24 February 1998 (age 28) Sigulda, Latvia
- Height: 1.95 m (6 ft 5 in)
- Weight: 105 kg (231 lb)

Sport
- Country: Latvia
- Sport: Luge
- Event: Singles
Medal record
Men's luge
Representing Latvia
Olympic Games
| Bronze medal – third place | 2022 Beijing | Team relay |
World Championships
| Silver medal – second place | 2020 Sochi | Team relay |
| Bronze medal – third place | 2023 Oberhof | Team relay |
| Bronze medal – third place | 2024 Alternberg | Sprint |
| Bronze medal – third place | 2024 Altenberg | Team relay |
European Championships
| Gold medal – first place | 2022 St. Moritz | Team relay |
| Gold medal – first place | 2023 Sigulda | Team relay |
| Silver medal – second place | 2022 St. Moritz | Singles |
| Bronze medal – third place | 2019 Oberhof | Singles |
| Bronze medal – third place | 2020 Lillehammer | Team relay |
| Bronze medal – third place | 2023 Sigulda | Singles |
| Bronze medal – third place | 2026 Oberhof | Team relay |
Winter Youth Olympic Games
| Gold medal – first place | 2016 Lillehammer | Singles |
World Junior Championships
| Gold medal – first place | 2015 Lillehammer | Team relay |
| Gold medal – first place | 2017 Sigulda | Singles |
| Silver medal – second place | 2016 Winterberg | Singles |

Kristers Aparjods (born 24 February 1998) is a Latvian luger. He is a 2022 Olympic bronze medalist in the team relay, four-time World Championships medalist (1 silver, 3 bronze), and seven-time European Championships medalist (2 gold, 1 silver, 4 bronze).

== Career ==
He took the gold medal in the singles event in the 2016 Winter Youth Olympics in Lillehammer, Norway, where he was also selected as the flag bearer for the Latvians in the opening ceremony. He was also part of the Latvian team which won the team relay at the 2015 Junior World Championships in Lillehammer, and went on to take a silver in the singles at the 2016 Junior World Championships in Winterberg, Germany, and a gold in the singles on home ice at the 2017 Junior Worlds at Sigulda. He competed at the 2018 Winter Olympics, finishing 11th in the men's singles event and sixth in the team relay.

At the 2024 FIL World Luge Championships, he won bronze medals in the sprint event and the team relay.

== Personal life ==
He is the son of luger Aiva Aparjode and the brother of luger Kendija Aparjode.
