= Jozef Ninis =

Slovak luger (born 1981)

- Ninis in 2026

Personal information
- Born: 28 June 1981 (age 45) Čadca, Czechoslovakia

Sport
- Country: Slovakia
- Sport: Luge

Jozef Ninis (born 28 June 1981) is a Slovak luger who has competed since 1996. Competing in six Winter Olympics, he earned his best finish of 19th in the 2026 men's singles event.

Ninis's best finish at the FIL World Luge Championships was 13th in the men's singles event at Oberhof in 2008. Now it is 12th place in the men's singles event in 2020 FIL World Luge Championships
