= Tucker West =

American luger (born 1995)

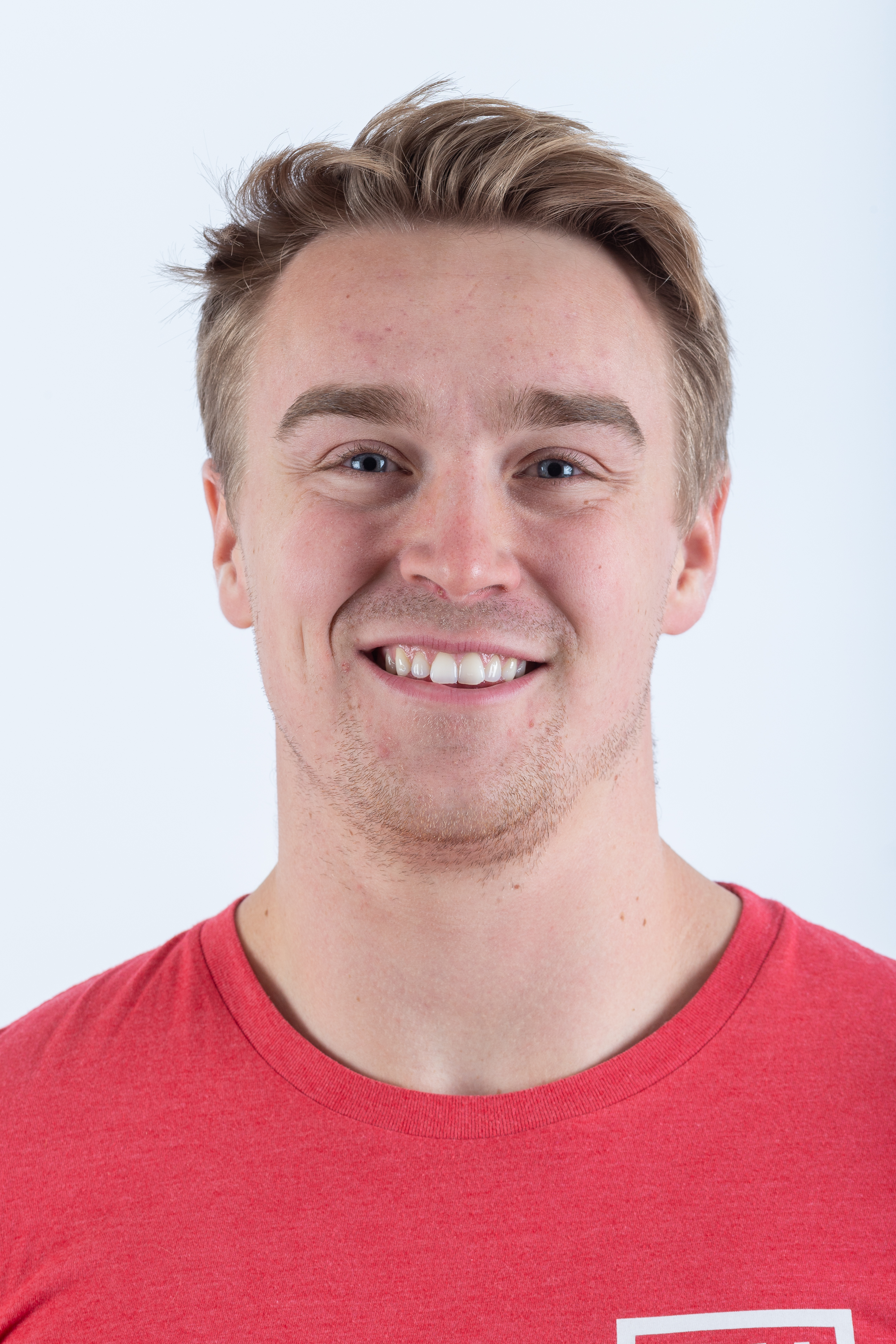
- West in 2018

Personal information
- Born: June 15, 1995 (age 31) Ridgefield, United States
- Height: 6 ft 0.5 in (184 cm)
- Weight: 195 lb (88 kg)

Sport
- Country: United States
- Sport: Luge
- Event: Singles
Medal record
Men's luge
Representing the United States
World Championships
Silver medal – second place	2017 Igls	Team relay
Silver medal – second place	2024 Altenberg	Team relay
Bronze medal – third place	2020 Sochi	Team relay

Tucker West (born June 15, 1995) is an American luger who, at the age of 18, was the youngest male ever to qualify to represent the United States in the men's luge at the Olympics. West placed 22nd in the men's single competition at the 2014 Winter Olympics in Sochi, Russia.

== Career ==
West attended National Sports Academy High in Lake Placid, New York. Before going away to school he was a resident of Ridgefield, Connecticut. When West was a boy, his father designed and built a wood luge track in the backyard of their Ridgefield home. West attends Union College in Schenectady, New York.

Before making the ten-member Sochi squad, West was the co-champion of the 2012 U.S luge singles title with Chris Mazdzer, a U.S junior silver medalist, and a silver medalist at the 2011 World Cup in Austria.

On December 5, 2014, West won the 2014–15 Luge World Cup men's singles race in Lake Placid. This win made him the first American to be victorious in a men's singles world cup event since Wendel Suckow on February 15, 1997.

On December 4, 2015, West finished second in the same men's singles Luge World Cup event to his teammate Chris Mazdzer in the first-ever one-two finish for the United States in a men's singles Luge World Cup event.

On December 2, 2016, West was triumphant for a second time, again winning the 2016-17 Luge World Cup men's singles race in Lake Placid, this time besting the second-place slider, Semen Pavlichenko of Russia, by only 0.006 seconds for a time of 1:43.088. Then the following week at the next stop on the tour in Whistler, British Columbia, he won the men's singles event again for back-to-back victories on the circuit.

On December 15, 2017, West placed third, taking the bronze with a combined time of 1:42:226 at the Lake Placid stop on the 2017-18 Luge World Cup circuit and in doing so, secured himself a spot on the United States squad to compete at the 2018 Winter Olympics in Pyeongchang County, South Korea. He came in third in the Mount Van Hoevenberg event after two Russian sliders who placed first and second, respectively, Roman Repilov and Semen Pavlichenko. West briefly broke his own track record in winning the first run with a time of 50.94 seconds, but, in turn, his new record was bested in the second run by Replilov's 50.85 time (the new standing mark for the track).

He competed at the 2024 FIL World Luge Championships and won a silver medal in the team relay.
