= Gints Bērziņš =

Latvian luger (born 2002)

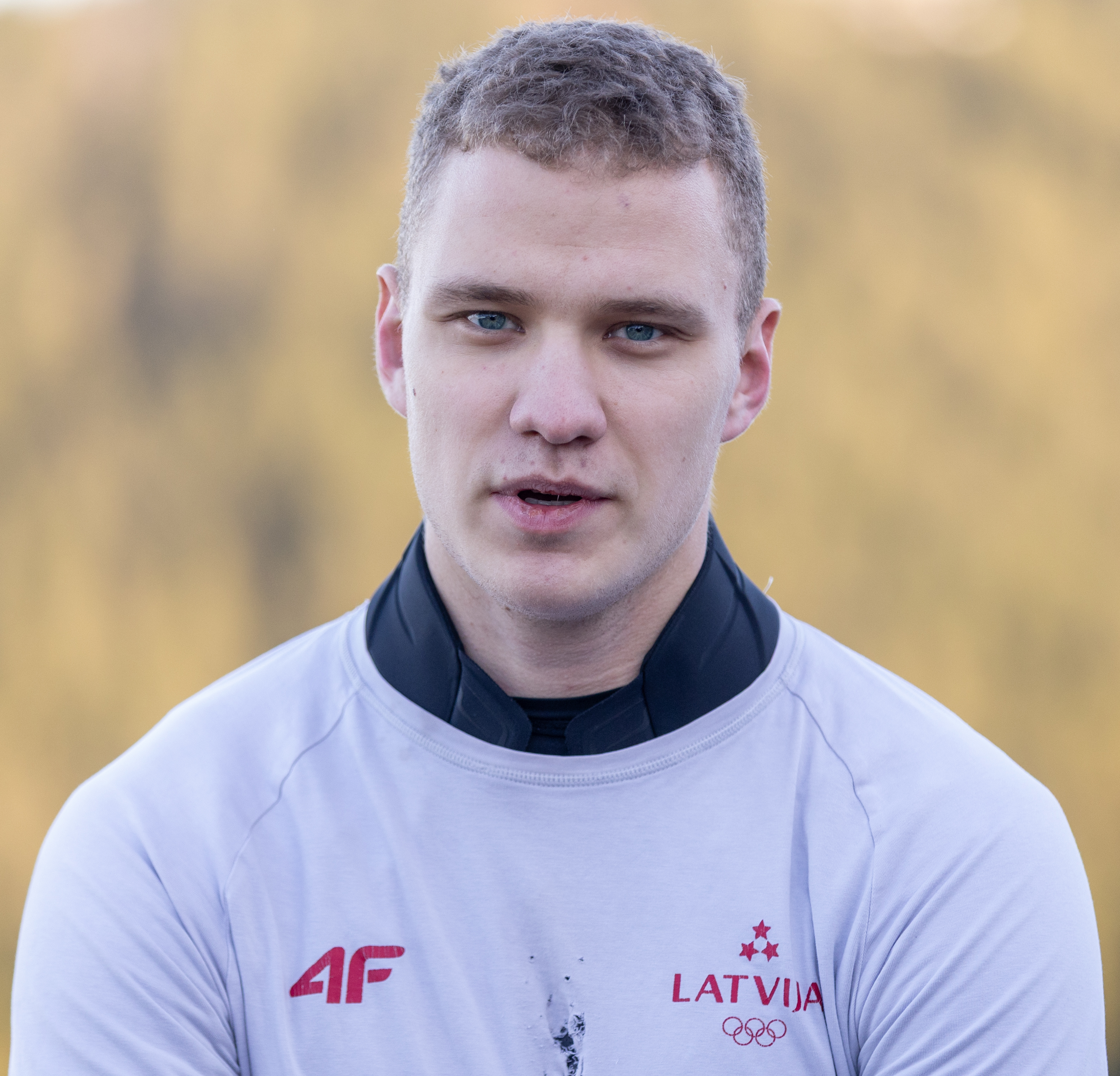
- Bērziņš in 2026

Personal information
- Born: 8 March 2002 (age 24) Sigulda, Latvia
- Height: 189 cm (6 ft 2 in)
- Weight: 90 kg (198 lb)

Sport
- Country: Latvia
- Sport: Luge

Gints Bērziņš (born 8 March 2002) is a Latvian luger who competes internationally.

He represented Latvia at the 2022 and 2026 Winter Olympics.
