= Leon Felderer =

Italian luger (born 2000)

- Felderer in 2026

Personal information
- Born: 30 January 2000 (age 26) Latzfons

Sport
- Country: Italy
- Sport: Luge

Leon Felderer (born 30 January 2000) is an Italian luger who competes internationally.

He represented Italy at the 2022 and 2026 Winter Olympics.
