= Valentin Crețu (luger) =

Romanian luger (born 1989)

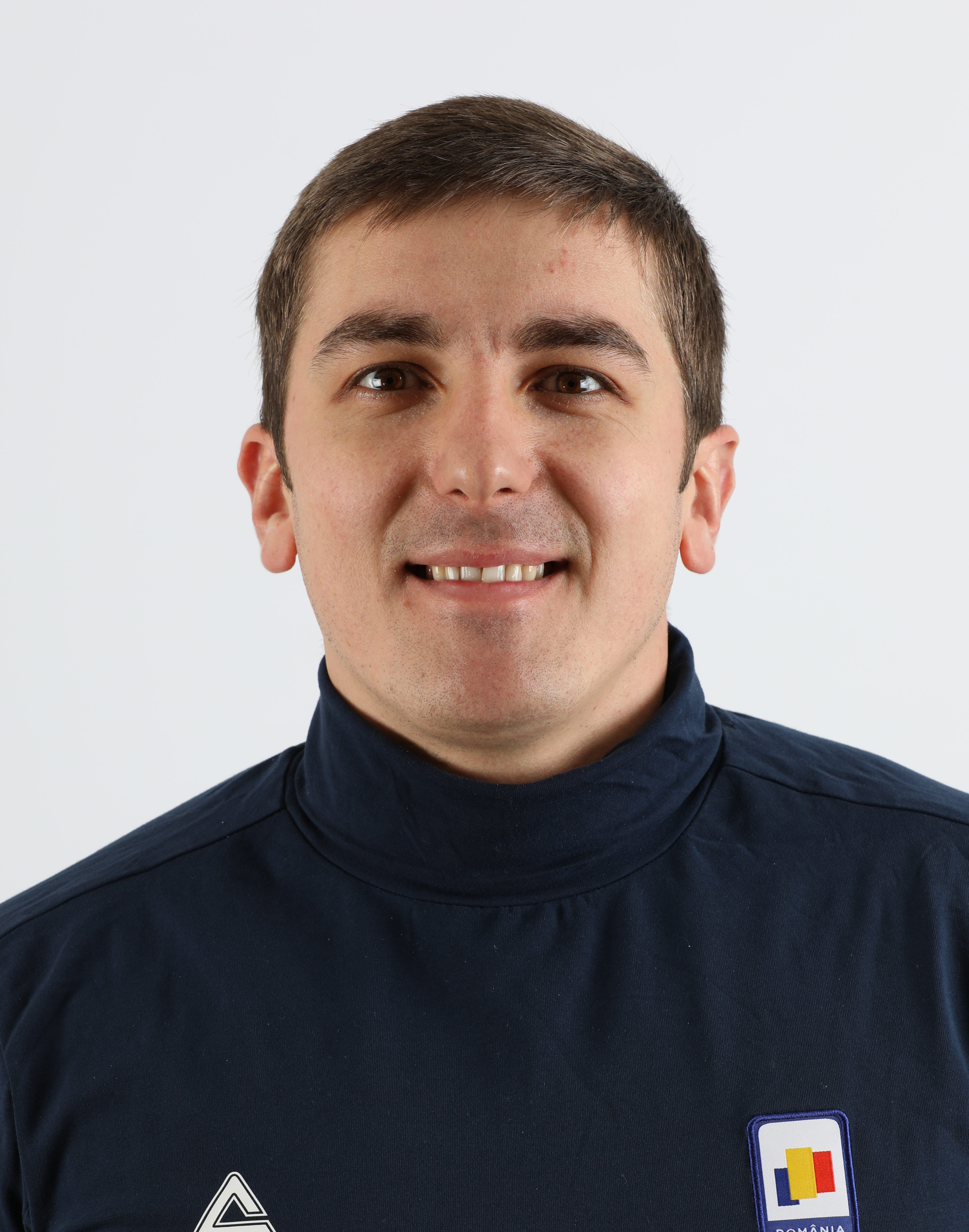
- Crețu in 2018

Personal information
- Born: 9 September 1989 (age 36) Sinaia
- Height: 180 cm (5 ft 11 in)
- Weight: 88 kg (194 lb)

Valentin Creţu (born 9 September 1989) is a Romanian luger who has competed since 2000. His best finish at the FIL World Luge Championships was 27th in the men's singles event at Altenberg in 2012.

Crețu qualified for the 2010 Winter Olympics where he finished 31st in the men's singles event.

At the 2026 Winter Olympics, Crețu finished 15th in the men's singles event.
