= Mateusz Sochowicz =

Polish luger (born 1996)

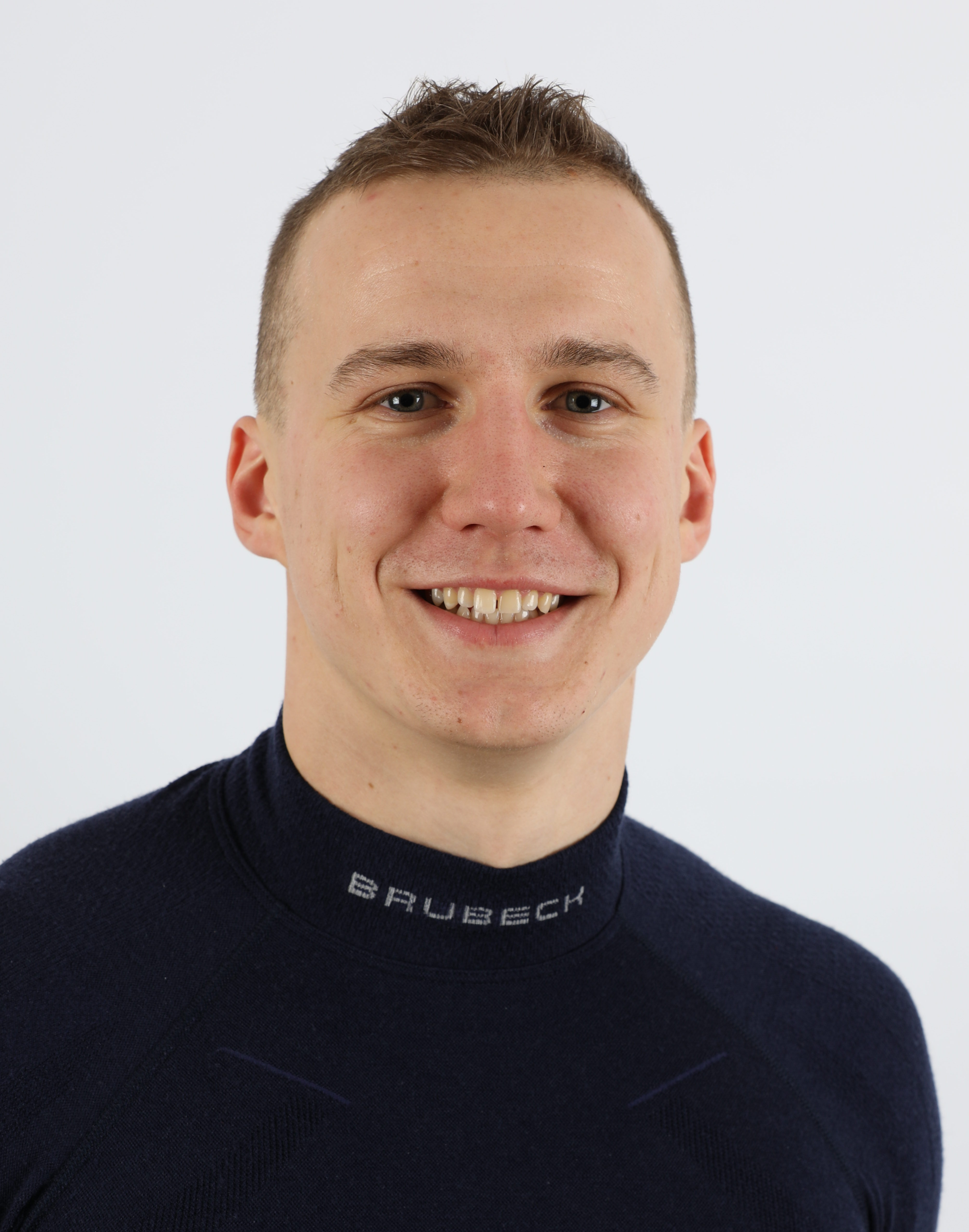
- Mateusz Sochowicz (2018)

Personal information
- Nationality: Polish
- Born: 28 February 1996 (age 30) Wrocław, Poland

Sport
- Sport: Luge

Mateusz Sochowicz (born 28 February 1996) is a Polish luger. He has competed at the 2018, 2022, and 2026 Winter Olympics.

== Career ==
Sochowicz made his Olympic debut at the 2018 Winter Olympics in Pyeongchang, South Korea.

In early November 2021, he sustained injuries while training near Beijing in preparation for the 2022 Winter Olympics. Having been given the green light, he began his training run but encountered a closed gate and found that jumping over it, as he initially hoped, would not be possible. However, he was able to somewhat reduce the impact of the crash, resulting in a fractured left kneecap and his right leg being cut to the bone. He underwent knee surgery after the training accident. After the incident, the International Luge Federation added more safety measures.

Sochowicz returned to competition in January 2022. He was included in Poland's Olympic team.
