= Svante Kohala =

Swedish luger (born 1998)

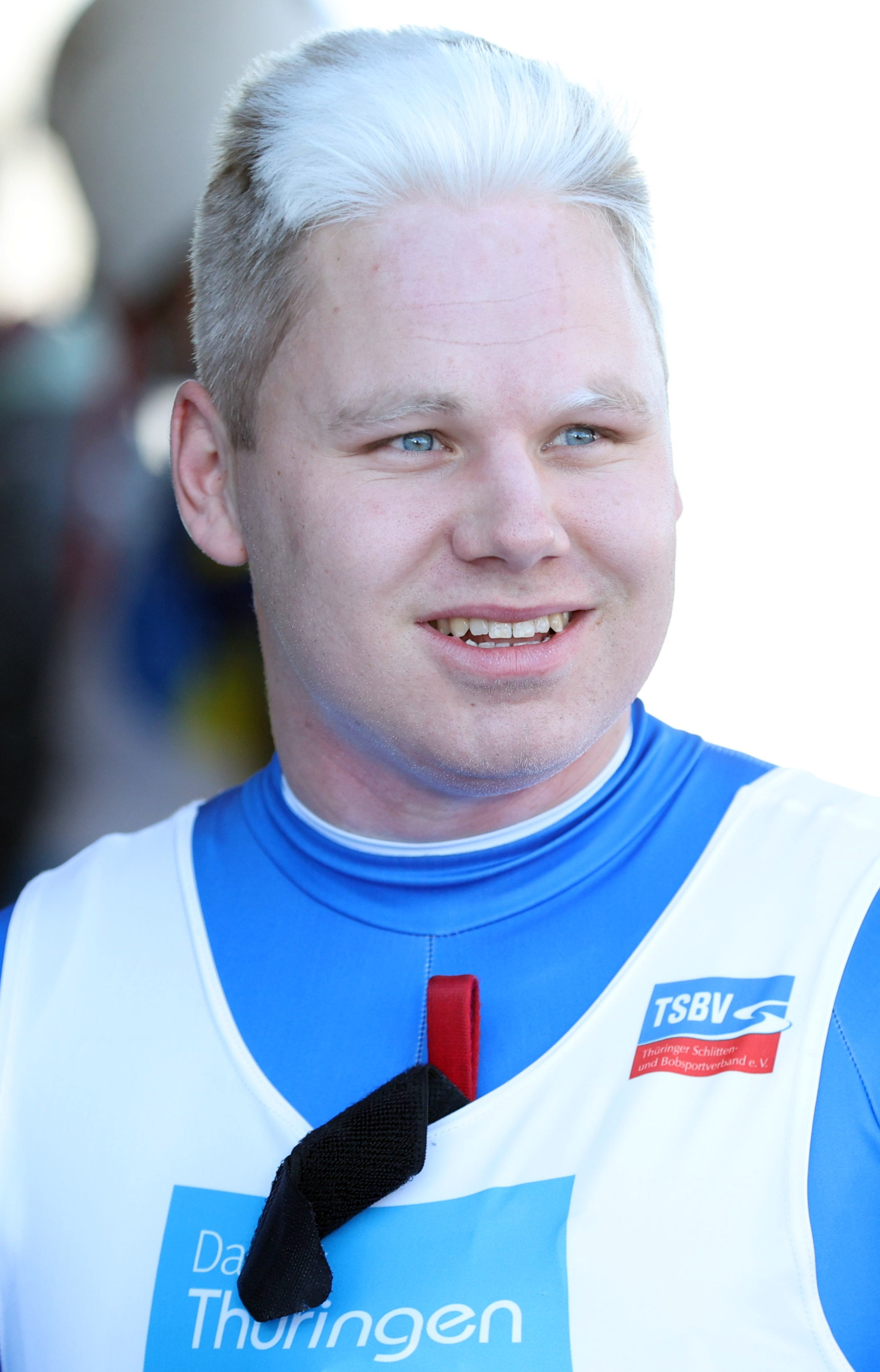
- Kohala in 2024

Personal information
- Born: 9 February 1998 (age 28) Stockholm, Sweden

Sport
- Country: Sweden
- Sport: Luge

Svante Kohala (born 9 February 1998) is a Swedish luger who competes internationally.

He represented Sweden at the 2022 and 2026 Winter Olympics.

His father, Hans, competed at the 1992 and 1994 Winter Olympics.
