= List of flag bearers for Georgia at the Olympics =

Georgia at the Olympics
- Flag of Georgia
- IOC code: GEO
- NOC: Georgian National Olympic Committee
- Website: www.geonoc.org.ge (in Georgian and English)
- Medals: Gold 13 Silver 16 Bronze 19 Total 48

Summer appearances
- 1996; 2000; 2004; 2008; 2012; 2016; 2020; 2024

Winter appearances
- 1994; 1998; 2002; 2006; 2010; 2014; 2018; 2022; 2026

Other related appearances
- Russian Empire (1900–1912); Soviet Union (1952–1988); Unified Team (1992)

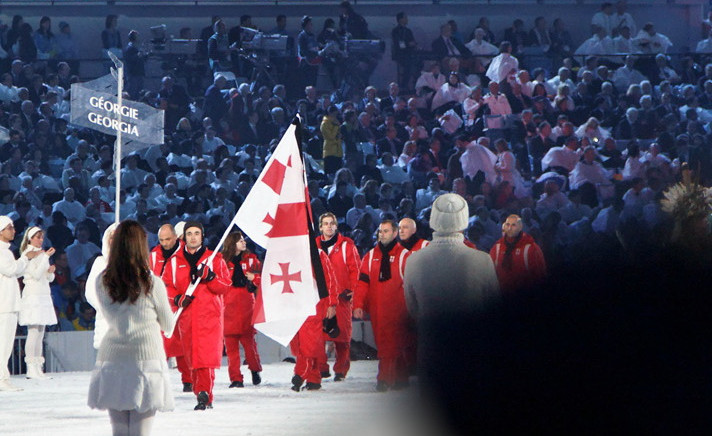
Iason Abramashvili carrying the flag with a black ribbon following the death of luge athlete Nodar Kumaritashvili earlier that day.

This is a list of flag bearers who have represented Georgia at the Olympics. Flag bearers carry the national flag of their country at the opening ceremony of the Olympic Games.

#	Event year	Season	Flag bearer	Sport
1	1994	Winter	Zurab Dzhidzhishvili	Alpine skiing
2	1996	Summer	Giorgi Kandelaki	Boxing
3	1998	Winter	Sofia Akhmeteli	Alpine skiing
4	2000	Summer	Giorgi Asanidze	Weightlifting
5	2002	Winter	Sofia Akhmeteli	Alpine skiing
6	2004	Summer	Zurab Zviadauri	Judo
7	2006	Winter	Vakhtang Murvanidze	Figure Skating
8	2008	Summer	Ramaz Nozadze	Wrestling
9	2010	Winter	Iason Abramashvili	Alpine skiing
10	2012	Summer	Nino Salukvadze	Shooting
11	2014	Winter	Nino Tsiklauri	Alpine skiing
12	2016	Summer	Avtandili Tchrikishvili	Judo
13	2018	Winter	Morisi Kvitelashvili	Figure skating
14	2020	Summer	Nino Salukvadze	Shooting
14	2020	Summer	Lasha Talakhadze	Weightlifting
15	2022	Winter	Morisi Kvitelashvili	Figure skating
15	2022	Winter	Nino Tsiklauri	Alpine skiing
16	2024	Summer	Nino Salukvadze	Shooting
16	2024	Summer	Lasha Talakhadze	Weightlifting
17	2026	Winter	Luka Berulava	Figure skating
17	2026	Winter	Diana Davis	Figure skating

== See also ==
- Georgia at the Olympics
