= Georgia at the 1994 Winter Olympics =

- Flag of Georgia
- IOC code: GEO
- NOC: Georgian National Olympic Committee
- Website: www.geonoc.org.ge (in Georgian and English)

in Lillehammer
- Competitors: 5 in 3 sports
- Flag bearer: Zurab Dzhidzhishvili
- Medals: Gold 0 Silver 0 Bronze 0 Total 0

Winter Olympics appearances (overview)
- 1994; 1998; 2002; 2006; 2010; 2014; 2018; 2022; 2026; 2030

Other related appearances
- Soviet Union (1956–1988)

Georgia competed in the Winter Olympic Games as an independent country for the first time at the 1994 Winter Olympics in Lillehammer, Norway.

== Competitors ==
The following is the list of number of competitors in the Games.

Sport	Men	Women	Total
Alpine skiing	2	0	2
Luge	2	0	2
Ski jumping	1	–	1
Total	5	0	5

== Alpine skiing ==
Men

Athlete	Event	Final				
Athlete	Event	Run 1	Run 2	Run 3	Total	Rank
Zurab Dzhidzhishvili	Downhill				1:53.27	47
Zurab Dzhidzhishvili	Combined	1:42.44	DNF		Did not finish	
Levan Abramishvili	Slalom	DNF			Did not finish	

== Luge ==
Athlete	Event	Final					
Athlete	Event	Run 1	Run 2	Run 3	Run 4	Total	Rank
Levan Tibilov; Kakha Vakhtangishvili	Doubles	49.880	49.504			1:39.384	17

== Ski jumping ==
Athlete	Event	First Round		Final		
Athlete	Event	Points	Rank	Points	Total	Rank
Kakha Tsakadze	Large hill	28.5	52	34.4	62.9	55
Kakha Tsakadze	Normal hill	83.5	53	73.0	156.5	50
