= Georgia at the 1998 Winter Olympics =

- Flag of Georgia
- IOC code: GEO
- NOC: Georgian National Olympic Committee
- Website: www.geonoc.org.ge (in Georgian and English)

in Nagano
- Competitors: 4 (3 men, 1 woman) in 2 sports
- Flag bearer: Sofia Akhmeteli (alpine skiing)
- Medals: Gold 0 Silver 0 Bronze 0 Total 0

Winter Olympics appearances (overview)
- 1994; 1998; 2002; 2006; 2010; 2014; 2018; 2022; 2026

Other related appearances
- Soviet Union (1956–1988)

Georgia was represented at the 1998 Winter Olympics in Nagano, Japan by the Georgian National Olympic Committee.

In total, four athletes including three men and one woman represented Georgia in two different sports including alpine skiing and ski jumping.

== Competitors ==
In total, four athletes represented Georgia at the 1998 Winter Olympics in Nagano, Japan across two different sports.

Sport	Men	Women	Total
Alpine skiing	2	1	3
Ski jumping	1	–	1
Total	3	1	4

== Alpine skiing ==
In total, three Georgian athletes participated in the alpine skiing events – Levan Abramishvili in the men's slalom, Sofia Akhmeteli in the women's slalom and Zurab Dzhidzhishvili in the men's super-G and the men's combined.

The alpine skiing events took place from 10 to 21 February 1998. The speed events were held at the Hakuba Happoone Winter Resort in Hakuba, Nagano Prefecture and the technical events were held at Shiga Kogen in Yamanouchi, Nagano Prefecture.

The men's super-G took place on 16 February 1998. Dzhidzhishvili did not finish.

The women's slalom took place on 19 February 1998. Akhmeteli was disqualified following her first run for missing a gate.

The men's slalom took place on 21 February 1998. Abramishvili did not finish his first run and did not take part in the second run.

Athlete	Event	Race 1	Race 2	Total	
Athlete	Event	Time	Time	Time	Rank
Zurab Dzhidzhishvili	Men's super-G			DNF	–
Levan Abramishvili	Men's slalom	DNF	–	DNF	–
Sofia Akhmeteli	Women's slalom	DSQ	–	DSQ	–

Athlete	Event	Slalom		Downhill	Total	
Athlete	Event	Time 1	Time 2	Time	Total time	Rank
Zurab Dzhidzhishvili	Men's combined	1:00.20	55.06	1:40.39	3:35.65	14

== Ski jumping ==
In total, one Georgian athlete participated in the ski jumping events – Kakha Tsakadze in the normal hill individual and the large hill individual.

The ski jumping events took place from 11 to 17 February 1998 at the Hakuba Ski Jumping Stadium in Hakuba, Nagano Prefecture.

The normal hill individual took place on 11 February 1998. Tsakadze scored 66.5 with his first jump which was ultimately not enough to advance.

The large hill individual took place on 15 February 1998. Tsakadze scored 52.6 with his first jump which was ultimately not enough to advance.

Athlete	Event	Jump 1			Jump 2		Total	
Athlete	Event	Distance	Points	Rank	Distance	Points	Points	Rank
Kakha Tsakadze	Normal hill	69.0	66.5	55	did not advance			
Kakha Tsakadze	Large hill	89.5	52.6	59	did not advance			
