= Georgia at the Olympics =

- Flag of Georgia
- IOC code: GEO
- NOC: Georgian National Olympic Committee
- Website: www.geonoc.org.ge (in Georgian and English)
- Medals Ranked 56th: Gold 13 Silver 16 Bronze 19 Total 48

Summer appearances
- 1996; 2000; 2004; 2008; 2012; 2016; 2020; 2024; 2028

Winter appearances
- 1994; 1998; 2002; 2006; 2010; 2014; 2018; 2022; 2026

Other related appearances
- Russian Empire (1900–1912); Soviet Union (1952–1988); Unified Team (1992)

Georgia first participated at the Olympic Games as an independent nation in 1994 and has sent athletes to compete in every Summer Olympic Games and Winter Olympic Games since then.

Previously, Georgian athletes competed as part of the Soviet Union from 1952 to 1988 and after the dissolution of the Soviet Union, Georgia was part of the Unified Team in 1992.

Georgian athletes have won a total of 48 medals, mostly in wrestling, judo and weightlifting. Georgia won its first Winter Olympics medal in 2026, a silver medal in the mixed pairs figure skating event won by Anastasiia Metelkina and Luka Berulava.

The Georgian National Olympic Committee was created in 1989 and recognized by the International Olympic Committee in 1993.

== Medal tables ==
=== Medals by Summer Games ===
Games	Athletes	Gold	Silver	Bronze	Total	Rank
1900–1912	as part of the Russian Empire					
1920–1948	did not participate					
1952–1988	as part of the Soviet Union					
1992 Barcelona	as part of the Unified Team					
1996 Atlanta	34	0	0	2	2	68
2000 Sydney	36	0	0	6	6	68
2004 Athens	32	2	2	0	4	32
2008 Beijing	35	3	2	2	7	28
2012 London	35	1	2	3	6	40
2016 Rio de Janeiro	40	2	1	4	7	38
2020 Tokyo	35	2	5	1	8	33
2024 Paris	28	3	3	1	7	24
2028 Los Angeles	future event					
2032 Brisbane	future event					
Total	275	13	15	19	47	53

=== Medals by Winter Games ===
Games	Athletes	Gold	Silver	Bronze	Total	Rank
1956–1988	as part of the Soviet Union					
1992 Albertville	did not participate					
1994 Lillehammer	5	0	0	0	0	–
1998 Nagano	4	0	0	0	0	–
2002 Salt Lake City	4	0	0	0	0	–
2006 Turin	3	0	0	0	0	–
2010 Vancouver	8	0	0	0	0	–
2014 Sochi	4	0	0	0	0	–
2018 Pyeongchang	4	0	0	0	0	–
2022 Beijing	9	0	0	0	0	–
2026 Milano Cortina	8	0	1	0	1	25
2030 French Alps	future event					
2034 Utah	future event					
Total	49	0	1	0	1	48

=== Medals by summer sport ===
Sport	Gold	Silver	Bronze	Total
Judo	5	7	3	15
Wrestling	4	7	10	21
Weightlifting	4	1	3	8
Boxing	0	0	2	2
Shooting	0	0	1	1
Totals (5 entries)	13	15	19	47

=== Medals by winter sport ===
Sport	Gold	Silver	Bronze	Total
Figure skating	0	1	0	1
Totals (1 entries)	0	1	0	1

== List of medalists ==
=== Summer Olympics ===
Medal	Name	Games	Sport	Event
Bronze	Soso Liparteliani	1996 Atlanta	Judo	Men's 78 kg
Bronze	Eldar Kurtanidze	1996 Atlanta	Wrestling	Men's freestyle 90 kg
Bronze	Giorgi Vazagashvili	2000 Sydney	Judo	Men's 66 kg
Bronze	Vladimer Chanturia	2000 Sydney	Boxing	Heavyweight
Bronze	Giorgi Asanidze	2000 Sydney	Weightlifting	Men's 85 kg
Bronze	Eldar Kurtanidze	2000 Sydney	Wrestling	Men's freestyle 97 kg
Bronze	Akaki Chachua	2000 Sydney	Wrestling	Men's Greco-Roman 63 kg
Bronze	Mukhran Vakhtangadze	2000 Sydney	Wrestling	Men's Greco-Roman 85 kg
Gold	Zurab Zviadauri	2004 Athens	Judo	Men's 90 kg
Gold	Giorgi Asanidze	2004 Athens	Weightlifting	Men's 85 kg
Silver	Nestor Khergiani	2004 Athens	Judo	Men's 60 kg
Silver	Ramaz Nozadze	2004 Athens	Wrestling	Men's Greco-Roman 96 kg
Gold	Irakli Tsirekidze	2008 Beijing	Judo	Men's 90 kg
Gold	Manuchar Kvirkvelia	2008 Beijing	Wrestling	Men's Greco-Roman 74 kg
Gold	Revaz Mindorashvili	2008 Beijing	Wrestling	Men's freestyle 84 kg
Silver	Giorgi Gogshelidze	2008 Beijing	Wrestling	Men's freestyle 96 kg
Silver	Arsen Kasabiev	2008 Beijing	Weightlifting	Men's 94 kg
Bronze	Nino Salukvadze	2008 Beijing	Shooting	Women's 10 metre air pistol
Bronze	Otar Tushishvili	2008 Beijing	Wrestling	Men's freestyle 66 kg
Gold	Lasha Shavdatuashvili	2012 London	Judo	Men's 66 kg
Silver	Revaz Lashkhi	2012 London	Wrestling	Men's Greco-Roman 60 kg
Silver	Vladimer Khinchegashvili	2012 London	Wrestling	Men's freestyle 55 kg
Bronze	Manuchar Tskhadaia	2012 London	Wrestling	Men's Greco-Roman 66 kg
Bronze	Dato Marsagishvili	2012 London	Wrestling	Men's freestyle 84 kg
Bronze	Giorgi Gogshelidze	2012 London	Wrestling	Men's freestyle 96 kg
Gold	Lasha Talakhadze	2016 Rio de Janeiro	Weightlifting	Men's +105 kg
Gold	Vladimer Khinchegashvili	2016 Rio de Janeiro	Wrestling	Men's freestyle 57 kg
Silver	Varlam Liparteliani	2016 Rio de Janeiro	Judo	Men's 90 kg
Bronze	Lasha Shavdatuashvili	2016 Rio de Janeiro	Judo	Men's 73 kg
Bronze	Shmagi Bolkvadze	2016 Rio de Janeiro	Wrestling	Men's Greco-Roman 66 kg
Bronze	Irakli Turmanidze	2016 Rio de Janeiro	Weightlifting	Men's +105 kg
Bronze	Geno Petriashvili	2016 Rio de Janeiro	Wrestling	Men's freestyle 125 kg
Gold	Lasha Bekauri	2020 Tokyo	Judo	Men's 90 kg
Gold	Lasha Talakhadze	2020 Tokyo	Weightlifting	Men's +109 kg
Silver	Vazha Margvelashvili	2020 Tokyo	Judo	Men's 66 kg
Silver	Lasha Shavdatuashvili	2020 Tokyo	Judo	Men's 73 kg
Silver	Guram Tushishvili	2020 Tokyo	Judo	Men's +100 kg
Silver	Iakob Kajaia	2020 Tokyo	Wrestling	Men's Greco-Roman 130 kg
Silver	Geno Petriashvili	2020 Tokyo	Wrestling	Men's freestyle 125 kg
Bronze	Anton Pliesnoi	2020 Tokyo	Weightlifting	Men's 96 kg
Gold	Lasha Bekauri	2024 Paris	Judo	Men's 90 kg
Gold	Geno Petriashvili	2024 Paris	Wrestling	Men's freestyle 125 kg
Gold	Lasha Talakhadze	2024 Paris	Weightlifting	Men's +102 kg
Silver	Tato Grigalashvili	2024 Paris	Judo	Men's 81 kg
Silver	Ilia Sulamanidze	2024 Paris	Judo	Men's 100 kg
Silver	Givi Matcharashvili	2024 Paris	Wrestling	Men's freestyle 97 kg
Bronze	Lasha Guruli	2024 Paris	Boxing	Men's lightweight

bronze medal Giorgi Meshvilvi wrestling

=== Winter Olympics ===
Medal	Name	Games	Sport	Event
Silver	Luka Berulava; Anastasiia Metelkina	2026 Milano Cortina	Figure Skating	Pairs Skating

== Flagbearers ==
Summer Olympics
Games	Athlete	Sport
1996 Atlanta	Giorgi Kandelaki	Boxing
2000 Sydney	Giorgi Asanidze	Weightlifting
2004 Athens	Zurab Zviadauri	Judo
2008 Beijing	Ramaz Nozadze	Wrestling
2012 London	Nino Salukvadze	Shooting
2016 Rio de Janeiro	Avtandil Tchrikishvili	Judo
2020 Tokyo	Nino Salukvadze	Shooting
2020 Tokyo	Lasha Talakhadze	Weightlifting
2024 Paris	Nino Salukvadze	Shooting
2024 Paris	Lasha Talakhadze	Weightlifting

Winter Olympics
Games	Athlete	Sport
1994 Lillehammer	Zurab Dzhidzhishvili	Alpine skiing
1998 Nagano	Sofia Akhmeteli	Alpine skiing
2002 Salt Lake City	Sofia Akhmeteli	Alpine skiing
2006 Turin	Vakhtang Murvanidze	Figure skating
2010 Vancouver	Iason Abramashvili	Alpine skiing
2014 Sochi	Nino Tsiklauri	Alpine skiing
2018 Pyeongchang	Morisi Kvitelashvili	Figure skating
2022 Beijing	Morisi Kvitelashvili	Figure skating
2022 Beijing	Nino Tsiklauri	Alpine skiing
2026 Milano Cortina	Luka Berulava	Figure skating
2026 Milano Cortina	Diana Davis	Figure skating

== Changes in medal standing ==
1. Giorgi Gogshelidze from bronze to silver (Wrestling at the 2008 Summer Olympics – Men's freestyle 96 kg)
2. Arsen Kasabiev from 4th place to silver (Weightlifting at the 2008 Summer Olympics – Men's 94 kg)

== Disqualified medalists ==
Medal	Name	Sport	Event	Date
Silver	Davit Modzmanashvili	Wrestling	Men's 120 kg	11 August 2012

== See also ==
- Georgian National Olympic Committee
- Olympic competitors for Georgia
- List of flag bearers for Georgia at the Olympics
- Georgia at the Paralympics
