= Georgia at the 2014 Winter Olympics =

- Flag of Georgia
- IOC code: GEO
- NOC: Georgian National Olympic Committee
- Website: www.geonoc.org.ge (in Georgian and English)

in Sochi
- Competitors: 4 in 2 sports
- Flag bearers: Nino Tsiklauri (opening); Elene Gedevanishvili (closing)
- Medals: Gold 0 Silver 0 Bronze 0 Total 0

Winter Olympics appearances (overview)
- 1994; 1998; 2002; 2006; 2010; 2014; 2018; 2022; 2026; 2030

Other related appearances
- Soviet Union (1956–1988)

Georgia competed at the 2014 Winter Olympics in Sochi, Russia from 7-23 February 2014. The Georgian team consisted of four athletes in two sports. The team also sent seven officials. Georgia's government only decided to send athletes and coaches but no government officials due to the breakup in relations with Russia in the aftermath of the August 2008 war.

== Flagbearer ==
Originally figure skater Elene Gedevanishvili was supposed to be the flagbearer. However, because of training schedules, Gedevanishvili was scheduled to arrive after the opening ceremony. Therefore, alpine skier Nino Tsiklauri was selected to replace her.

== Alpine skiing ==
According to the quota allocation released on January 20, 2014, Georgia qualified three athletes.

Athlete	Event	Run 1		Run 2		Total	
Athlete	Event	Time	Rank	Time	Rank	Time	Rank
Iason Abramashvili	Men's giant slalom	DNF					
Iason Abramashvili	Men's slalom	52.59	43	1:00.78	23	1:53.37	22
Alex Beniaidze	Men's giant slalom	DNF					
Alex Beniaidze	Men's slalom	DNF					
Nino Tsiklauri	Women's giant slalom	1:27.27	54	1:28.07	50	2:55.34	49
Nino Tsiklauri	Women's slalom	DNF					

== Figure skating ==
Georgia achieved the following quota places:

Athlete	Event	SP		FS		Total	
Athlete	Event	Points	Rank	Points	Rank	Points	Rank
Elene Gedevanishvili	Ladies' singles	54.70	17 Q	92.45	20	147.15	19
