= Georgia at the 2022 Winter Olympics =

- Flag of Georgia
- IOC code: GEO
- NOC: Georgian National Olympic Committee
- Website: www.geonoc.org.ge

in Beijing, China 4–20 February 2022
- Competitors: 9 (5 men and 4 women) in 3 sports
- Flag bearers (opening): Morisi Kvitelashvili; Nino Tsiklauri
- Flag bearer (closing): Luka Berulava
- Medals: Gold 0 Silver 0 Bronze 0 Total 0

Winter Olympics appearances (overview)
- 1994; 1998; 2002; 2006; 2010; 2014; 2018; 2022; 2026

Other related appearances
- Soviet Union (1956–1988)

Georgia competed at the 2022 Winter Olympics in Beijing, China, from 4 to 20 February 2022.

On January 26, 2022, the Georgian team of nine athletes (five men and four women) competing in three sports was announced. Figure skater Morisi Kvitelashvili and alpine skier Nino Tsiklauri were also announced as the Georgian flagbearers during the opening ceremony. Meanwhile figure skater Luka Berulava was the flagbearer during the closing ceremony. The Athletes During the Opening Ceremony, Female Georgian Athletes are in White Outfits and Male Georgian Athletes in Blackish Blue Outfits

== Competitors ==
The following is the list of number of competitors participating at the Games per sport/discipline.

| Sport | Men | Women | Total |
|---|---|---|---|
| Alpine skiing | 1 | 1 | 2 |
| Figure skating | 3 | 3 | 6 |
| Luge | 1 | 0 | 1 |
| Total | 5 | 4 | 9 |

== Alpine skiing ==
By meeting the basic qualification standards, Georgia qualified one male and one female alpine skier.

| Athlete | Event | Run 1 | | Run 2 | | Total | |
| Athlete | Event | Time | Rank | Time | Rank | Time | Rank |
|---|---|---|---|---|---|---|---|
| Soso Japharidze | Men's giant slalom | DNF | | did not advance | | | |
| Soso Japharidze | Men's slalom | 1:02.02 | 41 | 55.87 | 30 | 1:57.89 | 32 |
| Nino Tsiklauri | Women's giant slalom | 1:04.49 | 41 | 1:05.38 | 35 | 2:09.87 | 34 |
| Nino Tsiklauri | Women's slalom | 1:00.11 | 47 | 1:00.37 | 42 | 2:00.48 | 42 |

== Figure skating ==
In the 2021 World Figure Skating Championships in Stockholm, Sweden, Georgia secured one quota in both the men's and women's singles competitions. Later in 2021, at the 2021 CS Nebelhorn Trophy in Oberstdorf, Germany, Georgia qualified an additional berth in the pairs' and ice dancing events. By qualifying an entry in each event, Georgia also qualified for the team event, for the first time.

| Athletes | Event | SP / RD | | FS / FD | | Total | |
| Athletes | Event | Points | Rank | Points | Rank | Points | Rank |
|---|---|---|---|---|---|---|---|
| Morisi Kvitelashvili | Men's | 97.98 | 5 Q | 170.64 | 11 | 268.62 | 10 |
| Anastasiia Gubanova | Women's | 65.40 | 10 Q | 135.58 | 10 | 200.98 | 11 |
| Karina Safina; Luka Berulava | Pairs | 66.11 | 9 Q | 126.33 | 8 | 192.44 | 9 |
| Maria Kazakova; Georgy Reviya | Ice dance | 67.08 | 18 Q | 97.25 | 19 | 164.33 | 19 |

Team trophy

| Athlete | Event | Short program/Rhythm dance | | | | | | Free skate/Free dance | | | | | |
| Athlete | Event | Men's | Women's | Pairs | Ice dance | Total | | Men's | Women's | Pairs | Ice dance | Total | |
| Athlete | Event | Points Team points | Points Team points | Points Team points | Points Team points | Points | Rank | Points Team points | Points Team points | Points Team points | Points Team points | Points | Rank |
|---|---|---|---|---|---|---|---|---|---|---|---|---|---|
| Morisi Kvitelashvili (M); Anastasiia Gubanova (W); Karina Safina (P); Luka Berulava (P); Maria Kazakova (ID); Georgy Reviya (ID) | Team event | 92.37; 7 | 67.56; 7 | 64.79; 5 | 64.60; 3 | 22 | 6 | did not advance | | | | | |

== Luge ==
Based on the results during the 2021–22 Luge World Cup season, Georgia qualified 1 sled in the men's singles. Saba Kumaritashvili represented the country. Kumaritashvili is the cousin of luger Nodar Kumaritashvili, who died during a training accident at the 2010 Winter Olympics.

| Athlete | Event | Run 1 | | Run 2 | | Run 3 | | Run 4 | | Total | |
| Athlete | Event | Time | Rank | Time | Rank | Time | Rank | Time | Rank | Time | Rank |
|---|---|---|---|---|---|---|---|---|---|---|---|
| Saba Kumaritashvili | Men's singles | 1:00.211 | 30 | 1:00.146 | 32 | 1:00.036 | 31 | did not advance | | 3:00.393 | 31 |
