= Georgia at the 2002 Winter Olympics =

- Flag of Georgia
- IOC code: GEO
- NOC: Georgian National Olympic Committee
- Website: www.geonoc.org.ge (in Georgian and English)

in Salt Lake City
- Competitors: 4 (3 men, 1 woman) in 3 sports
- Flag bearer: Sofia Akhmeteli (alpine skiing)
- Medals: Gold 0 Silver 0 Bronze 0 Total 0

Winter Olympics appearances (overview)
- 1994; 1998; 2002; 2006; 2010; 2014; 2018; 2022; 2026; 2030

Other related appearances
- Soviet Union (1956–1988)

Georgia competed at the 2002 Winter Olympics in Salt Lake City, United States.

== Alpine skiing ==
Men

Athlete	Event	Race 1	Race 2	Total	
Athlete	Event	Time	Time	Time	Rank
Robert Makharashvili	Slalom	DNF	–	DNF	–

Women

Athlete	Event	Race 1	Race 2	Total	
Athlete	Event	Time	Time	Time	Rank
Sofia Akhmeteli	Giant Slalom	DNF	–	DNF	–
Sofia Akhmeteli	Slalom	DNF	–	DNF	–

== Figure skating ==
Men

Athlete	Points	SP	FS	Rank
Vakhtang Murvanidze	26.0	18	17	17

== Ski jumping ==
Athlete	Event	Qualifying jump			Final jump 1			Final jump 2		Total	
Athlete	Event	Distance	Points	Rank	Distance	Points	Rank	Distance	Points	Points	Rank
Kakha Tsakadze	Normal hill	73.0	75.0	46	did not advance						
Kakha Tsakadze	Large hill	90.0	54.0	50	did not advance						
