= Georgia at the 2018 Winter Olympics =

- Flag of Georgia
- IOC code: GEO
- NOC: Georgian National Olympic Committee
- Website: www.geonoc.org.ge

in Pyeongchang, South Korea 9–25 February 2018
- Competitors: 4 (3 men and 1 woman) in 3 sports
- Flag bearer: Morisi Kvitelashvili
- Medals: Gold 0 Silver 0 Bronze 0 Total 0

Winter Olympics appearances (overview)
- 1994; 1998; 2002; 2006; 2010; 2014; 2018; 2022; 2026

Other related appearances
- Soviet Union (1956–1988)

Georgia competed at the 2018 Winter Olympics in Pyeongchang, South Korea, from 9 to 28 February 2018, with a total of four athletes in three sports.

== Competitors ==
The following is the list of number of competitors participating at the Games per sport/discipline.

Sport	Men	Women	Total
Alpine skiing	1	1	2
Figure skating	1	0	1
Luge	1	0	1
Total	3	1	4

== Alpine skiing ==
Georgia qualified two athletes, one male and one female.

Athlete	Event	Run 1		Run 2		Total	
Athlete	Event	Time	Rank	Time	Rank	Time	Rank
Iason Abramashvili	Men's giant slalom	DNF					
Iason Abramashvili	Men's slalom	52.69	35	55.00	29	1:47.69	28
Nino Tsiklauri	Women's giant slalom	1:20.02	51	1:16.91	46	2:36.93	46
Nino Tsiklauri	Women's slalom	55.88	43	55.74	40	1:51.62	39

== Figure skating ==
Georgia has qualified one male figure skater, based on its placement at the 2017 World Figure Skating Championships in Helsinki, Finland.

Athlete	Event	SP		FS		Total	
Athlete	Event	Points	Rank	Points	Rank	Points	Rank
Moris Kvitelashvili	Men's singles	76.56	22 Q	128.01	24	204.57	24

== Luge ==
Based on the results from the World Cups during the 2017–18 Luge World Cup season, Georgia qualified 1 sled.

Athlete	Event	Run 1		Run 2		Run 3		Run 4		Total	
Athlete	Event	Time	Rank	Time	Rank	Time	Rank	Time	Rank	Time	Rank
Giorgi Sogoiani	Men's singles	49.300	30	49.151	34	49.008	33	Eliminated		2:27.459	32
