= Abramashvili =

Abramashvili (Georgian: აბრამაშვილი) is a Georgian surname. Notable people with the surname include:

- Iason Abramashvili (born 1988), Georgian alpine skier
- Nikolay Abramashvili (1918–1942), Soviet Georgian World War II flying ace

== See also ==
- Abramishvili
