= Georgia at the 2006 Winter Olympics =

- Flag of Georgia
- IOC code: GEO
- NOC: Georgian National Olympic Committee
- Website: www.geonoc.org.ge (in Georgian and English)

in Turin
- Competitors: 3 (2 men, 1 woman) in 2 sports
- Flag bearers: Vakhtang Murvanidze (opening); Iason Abramashvili (closing)
- Medals: Gold 0 Silver 0 Bronze 0 Total 0

Winter Olympics appearances (overview)
- 1994; 1998; 2002; 2006; 2010; 2014; 2018; 2022; 2026

Other related appearances
- Soviet Union (1956–1988)

Georgia competed at the 2006 Winter Olympics in Turin, Italy.

== Alpine skiing ==
Athlete	Event	Final				
Athlete	Event	Run 1	Run 2	Run 3	Total	Rank
Iason Abramashvili	Men's giant slalom	1:27.59	1:27.27	n/a	2:54.86	29
Iason Abramashvili	Men's slalom	1:01.84	56.83	n/a	1:58.67	32

Note: In the men's combined, run 1 is the downhill, and runs 2 and 3 are the slalom. In the women's combined, run 1 and 2 are the slalom, and run 3 the downhill.

== Figure skating ==
Athlete	Event	CD		SP/OD		FS/FD		Total	
Athlete	Event	Points	Rank	Points	Rank	Points	Rank	Points	Rank
Elene Gedevanishvili	Ladies'	n/a		57.90	6 Q	93.56	13	151.46	10
Vakhtang Murvanidze	Men's	n/a		49.68	28	did not advance			28

Key: CD = Compulsory Dance, FD = Free Dance, FS = Free Skate, OD = Original Dance, SP = Short Program
