= Abramishvili =

Abramishvili (Georgian: აბრამიშვილი) is a Georgian surname. Notable people with the surname include:

- Levan Abramishvili (born 1970), Georgian alpine skier
- Merab Abramishvili (1957–2006), Georgian painter

== See also ==
- Abramashvili
