= Figure skating at the 2026 Winter Olympics – Team event =

Team event at the XXV Olympic Winter Games
- Figure skating
- Venue: Milano Ice Skating Arena; Milan, Italy
- Dates: 6–8 February 2026
- Competitors: 23 singles skaters, 9 pairs teams, and 11 ice dance teams from 10 nations
- Winning score: 69 points

Medalists
1st place, gold medalist(s)		United States; Ilia Malinin, Alysa Liu, Amber Glenn, Ellie Kam, Daniel O'Shea, Madison Chock, Evan Bates
2nd place, silver medalist(s)		Japan; Yuma Kagiyama, Shun Sato, Kaori Sakamoto, Riku Miura, Ryuichi Kihara, Utana Yoshida, Masaya Morita
3rd place, bronze medalist(s)		Italy; Daniel Grassl, Matteo Rizzo, Lara Naki Gutmann, Sara Conti, Niccolò Macii, Charlène Guignard, Marco Fabbri

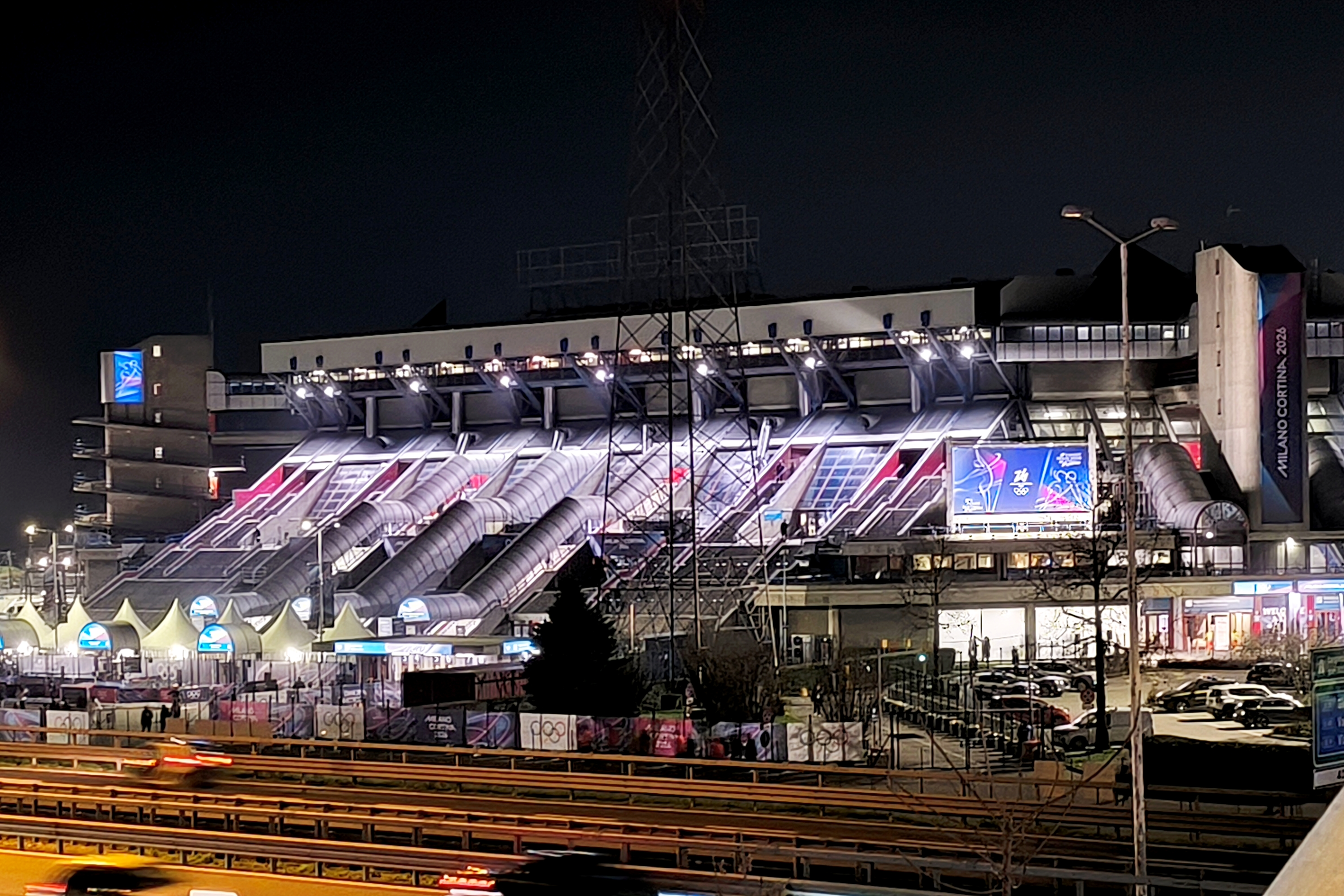
The figure skating events at the 2026 Winter Olympics were held at the Milano Ice Skating Arena in Milan, Italy.

The figure skating team event at the 2026 Winter Olympics was held from 6 to 8 February 2026 at the Milano Ice Skating Arena in Milan, Italy. The team event consisted of competitions in men's singles, women's singles, pair skating, and ice dance. Skaters and teams earned points based on their placements in each individual event, and the medalists were determined based on the total points earned. Going into the very last event, the men's free skate, the American and Japanese teams were tied. Ilia Malinin won the event, securing the gold for the United States, while the team from Japan won the silver, and the team from Italy won the bronze.

== Background ==
The team event is the newest Olympic figure skating event and was first contested at the 2014 Winter Olympics. The event combines the four Olympic figure skating disciplines (men's singles, women's singles, pair skating, and ice dance) into a single event; skaters earn points based on their placement in each discipline, and the gold medals are awarded to the team that earns the most placement points.

The figure skating team event was one of five figure skating competitions contested at the 2026 Winter Olympics in Milan, Italy. It was held at the Milano Ice Skating Arena over three days between 6 and 8 February 2026. The American team was favored to win the event with Japan expected to provide strong competition; other teams considered likely to be in medal contention were Italy, Georgia, and Canada. The Americans were the reigning champions in the team event. Although the team representing the Russian Olympic Committee had initially placed first at the 2022 Winter Olympics, with the American team second, and the Japanese team third, a failed doping test from Kamila Valieva of Russia eventually led to the cancellation of her scores from the event, which put the American team first, the Japanese team second, and the Russian team third.

The American team included three-time world champions in ice dance Madison Chock and Evan Bates, as well as the world champions in both the men's and women's events: Ilia Malinin and Alysa Liu, respectively. The biggest challenge to the American team was expected to come from the Japanese team. Kaori Sakamoto, the 2022 Winter Olympic bronze medalist and three-time world champion, as well as Yuma Kagiyama, two-time Winter Olympic silver medalist and four-time world medalist, were slated to compete in the first round of the team event. Additionally, Riku Miura and Ryuichi Kihara of Japan were the reigning world champions in pair skating. The Canadian team had ultimately finished in fourth place at the 2022 team event due to a controversial decision by the International Skating Union to award the bronze medals to the Russians. "We want the gold," said Canadian ice dancer Piper Gilles, "but a lot of it is out of our hands. What we can control is our skating, and how we feel about it, and what moment we want to create. That's when we skate our best."

In October 2023, the International Olympic Committee suspended the Russian Olympic Committee. The skating federations of Russia and Belarus were each permitted to nominate one skater or team in each discipline to participate at the Skate to Milano as a means to qualify for the 2026 Winter Olympics as Individual Neutral Athletes (AINs). Each nominee was required to pass a special screening process to assess whether they had displayed any active support for the 2022 Russian invasion of Ukraine or had any contractual links to the Russian or Belarusian military. The only two Russian skaters competing at the 2026 Winter Olympics – Petr Gumennik and Adeliia Petrosian – competed as AINs and were not eligible to participate in the team event.

On 2 February, Skate Canada announced that Deanna Stellato-Dudek and Maxime Deschamps would not compete in the team event after Stellato-Dudek suffered an injury during practice. Lia Pereira and Trennt Michaud competed instead.

== Qualification ==
For the team event, scores from the 2025 World Figure Skating Championships and the 2025–26 Grand Prix of Figure Skating season were tabulated to establish the ten top nations.

Qualification for figure skating team event
Pl.	Nation	M	W	P	D	Total
1	United States	Yes	Yes	Yes	Yes	7069
2	Japan	Yes	Yes	Yes	(Note: Although Japan did not qualify an ice dance team for the team event, they were able to use two additional athlete quotas in order to complete their team.)	6027
3	Italy	Yes	Yes	Yes	Yes	4606
4	Canada	Yes	Yes	Yes	Yes	4231
5	Georgia	Yes	Yes	Yes	Yes	4106
6	France	Yes	Yes	Yes	Yes	3829
7	Great Britain	(Note: Although Great Britain did not qualify a men's singles skater for the team event, they were able to use an additional athlete quota in order to complete their team.)	Yes	Yes	Yes	2671
8	South Korea	Yes	Yes	No	Yes	2171
9	China	Yes	Yes	Yes	Yes	2132
10	Poland	Yes	Yes	Yes	(Note: Although Poland did not qualify an ice dance team for the team event, they were able to use two additional athlete quotas in order to complete their team.)	776

== Entries ==
Code key

- SP – Short program
- FS – Free skate
- RD – Rhythm dance
- FD – Free dance

Member nations submitted the following entrants for the indicated segments in each discipline.

Team event entrants
Country	Men	Women	Pairs	Ice dance
Canada	Stephen Gogolev (SP/FS)	Madeline Schizas (SP/FS)	Lia Pereira; Trennt Michaud; (SP/FS)	Piper Gilles; Paul Poirier; (RD)
Canada	Stephen Gogolev (SP/FS)	Madeline Schizas (SP/FS)	Lia Pereira; Trennt Michaud; (SP/FS)	Marjorie Lajoie; Zachary Lagha; (FD)
China	Jin Boyang (SP)	Zhang Ruiyang (SP)	Sui Wenjing; Han Cong; (SP)	Wang Shiyue; Liu Xinyu; (RD)
France	Kévin Aymoz (SP)	Lorine Schild (SP)	Camille Kovalev; Pavel Kovalev; (SP)	Laurence Fournier Beaudry; Guillaume Cizeron; (RD)
Georgia	Nika Egadze (SP/FS)	Anastasiia Gubanova (SP/FS)	Anastasiia Metelkina; Luka Berulava; (SP/FS)	Diana Davis; Gleb Smolkin; (RD/FD)
Great Britain	Edward Appleby (SP)	Kristen Spours (SP)	Anastasia Vaipan-Law; Luke Digby; (SP)	Lilah Fear; Lewis Gibson; (RD)
Italy	Daniel Grassl (SP)	Lara Naki Gutmann (SP/FS)	Sara Conti; Niccolò Macii; (SP/FS)	Charlène Guignard; Marco Fabbri; (RD/FD)
Italy	Matteo Rizzo (FS)	Lara Naki Gutmann (SP/FS)	Sara Conti; Niccolò Macii; (SP/FS)	Charlène Guignard; Marco Fabbri; (RD/FD)
Japan	Yuma Kagiyama (SP)	Kaori Sakamoto (SP/FS)	Riku Miura; Ryuichi Kihara; (SP/FS)	Utana Yoshida; Masaya Morita; (RD/FD)
Japan	Shun Sato (FS)	Kaori Sakamoto (SP/FS)	Riku Miura; Ryuichi Kihara; (SP/FS)	Utana Yoshida; Masaya Morita; (RD/FD)
Poland	Vladimir Samoilov (SP)	Ekaterina Kurakova (SP)	Ioulia Chtchetinina; Michał Woźniak; (SP)	Sofiia Dovhal; Wiktor Kulesza; (RD)
South Korea	Cha Jun-hwan (SP)	Shin Ji-a (SP)	No pairs team	Hannah Lim; Ye Quan; (RD)
United States	Ilia Malinin (SP/FS)	Alysa Liu (SP)	Ellie Kam; Daniel O'Shea; (SP/FS)	Madison Chock; Evan Bates; (RD/FD)
United States	Ilia Malinin (SP/FS)	Amber Glenn (FS)	Ellie Kam; Daniel O'Shea; (SP/FS)	Madison Chock; Evan Bates; (RD/FD)

== Required performance elements ==
=== Single skating ===
The men competing in the team event performed their short programs on 7 February, while the women performed theirs on 6 February. Lasting 2 minutes 40 seconds (+/− 10 seconds), the short program had to include the following elements:

For men: one double or triple Axel; one triple or quadruple jump; one jump combination consisting of a double jump and a triple jump, two triple jumps, or a quadruple jump and a double jump or triple jump; one flying spin; one camel spin or sit spin with a change of foot; one spin combination with a change of foot; and one step sequence using the full ice surface.

For women: one double or triple Axel; one triple jump; one jump combination consisting of a double jump and a triple jump, or two triple jumps; one flying spin; one layback spin, sideways leaning spin, camel spin, or sit spin without a change of foot; one spin combination with a change of foot; and one step sequence using the full ice surface.

The five teams with the highest cumulative total points after the first round advanced to the final round. Regardless of their scores in the short program, the men and women from the top five teams performed their free skates on 8 February. Lasting 4 minutes (+/− 10 seconds), the free skate had to include the following: seven jump elements, of which one had to be an Axel-type jump; three spins, of which one had to be a spin combination, one a flying spin, and one a spin with only one position; one step sequence; and a choreographic sequence.

=== Pair skating ===
Pairs competing in the team event performed their short programs on 6 February. Lasting 2 minutes 40 seconds (+/− 10 seconds), the short program had to include the following elements: one pair lift, one double or triple twist lift, one double or triple throw jump, one double or triple solo jump, one solo spin combination with a change of foot, one death spiral, and one step sequence using the full ice surface.

Regardless of their scores in the short program, the couples from the top five teams performed their free skates on 8 February. Lasting 4 minutes (+/− 10 seconds), the free skate had to include the following: three pair lifts, of which one had to be a twist lift; two different throw jumps; one solo jump; one jump combination or sequence; one pair spin combination; one death spiral; and one choreographic sequence.

=== Ice dance ===
The ice dance couples competing in the team event performed their rhythm dances on 6 February. Lasting 2 minutes 50 seconds (+/− 10 seconds), the theme of the rhythm dance this season was "music, dance styles, and feeling of the 1990s". Examples of applicable dance styles and music included pop, Latin, house, techno, hip-hop, and grunge. The rhythm dance had to include the following elements: one pattern dance step sequence, one choreographic rhythm sequence, one dance lift, one set of sequential twizzles, and one step sequence.

Regardless of their scores in the rhythm dance, the couples from the top five teams performed their free dances on 7 February. Lasting 4 minutes (+/− 10 seconds), the free dance had to include the following: three dance lifts, one dance spin, one set of synchronized twizzles, one step sequence in hold, one step sequence while on one skate and not touching, and three choreographic elements.

== Judging ==
Skaters were judged according to the required technical elements of their program (such as jumps and spins), as well as the overall presentation of their program, based on three program components (skating skills, presentation, and composition). Each technical element in a figure skating performance was assigned a predetermined base point value and scored by a panel of nine judges on a scale from −5 to +5 based on the quality of its execution. Each Grade of Execution (GOE) from –5 to +5 was assigned a value as indicated on the Scale of Values. For example, a triple Axel was worth a base value of 8.00 points, and a GOE of +3 was worth 2.40 points, so a triple Axel with a GOE of +3 earned 10.40 points. The judging panel's GOE for each element was determined by calculating the trimmed mean (the average after discarding the highest and lowest scores). The panel's scores for all elements were added together to generate a Total Elements Score. At the same time, the judges evaluated each performance based on the five aforementioned program components and assigned each a score from 0.25 to 10 in 0.25-point increments. The judging panel's final score for each program component was also determined by calculating the trimmed mean. Those scores were then multiplied by the factor shown on the chart below; the results were added together to generate a total Program Component Score.

Program component factoring
Discipline	Short program or rhythm dance	Free skate or free dance
Men	1.67	3.33
Women	1.33	2.67
Pairs	1.33	2.67
Ice dance	1.33	2.00

Deductions were applied for certain violations, such as time infractions or falls. The Total Elements Score and Program Component Score were then added together, minus any deductions, to generate a final performance score for each skater or team.

== Team event scoring ==
The ten skaters or teams in each discipline performed their short programs and rhythm dances first, and were judged as they would have been at any other figure skating competition. The skater or team in each discipline who received the highest score earned ten points, the next highest score earned nine points, and so on. Once all four events were held, the points earned in each event were totaled, and the five teams with the highest totals moved on to the final round. Teams could elect to substitute up to two skaters or teams at this point. The five skaters or teams in each discipline then performed their free skates and free dances, and again received scores from the judges. The skater or team in each discipline who received the highest score earned ten points, and so on. Once all four events were held, the points earned over both rounds were totaled to determine the medalists.

== Medal summary ==
Medal summary
Gold	Silver	Bronze
United States; Ilia Malinin; Alysa Liu; Amber Glenn; Ellie Kam; Daniel O'Shea; Madison Chock; Evan Bates	Japan; Yuma Kagiyama; Shun Sato; Kaori Sakamoto; Riku Miura; Ryuichi Kihara; Utana Yoshida; Masaya Morita	Italy; Daniel Grassl; Matteo Rizzo; Lara Naki Gutmann; Sara Conti; Niccolò Macii; Charlène Guignard; Marco Fabbri

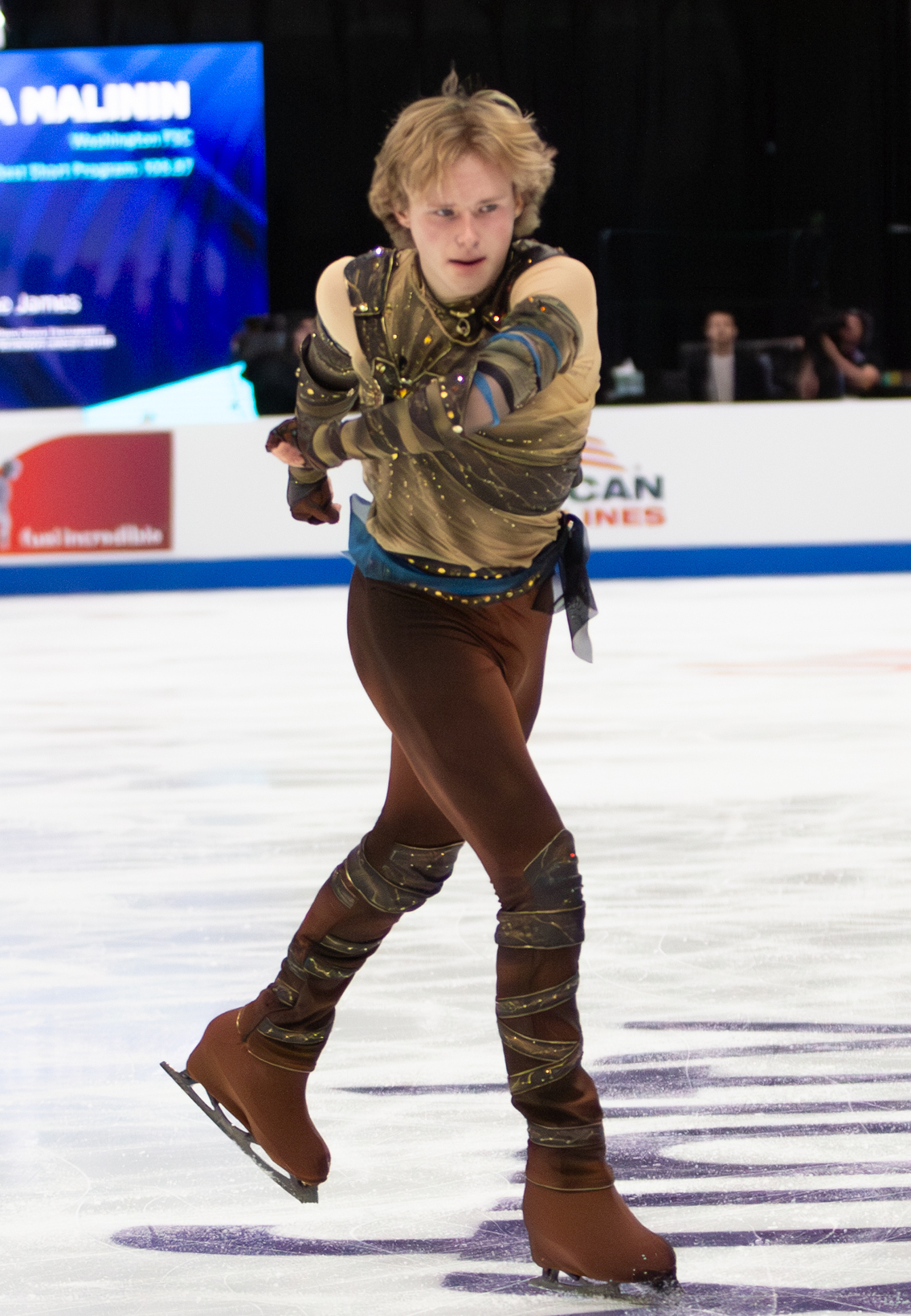
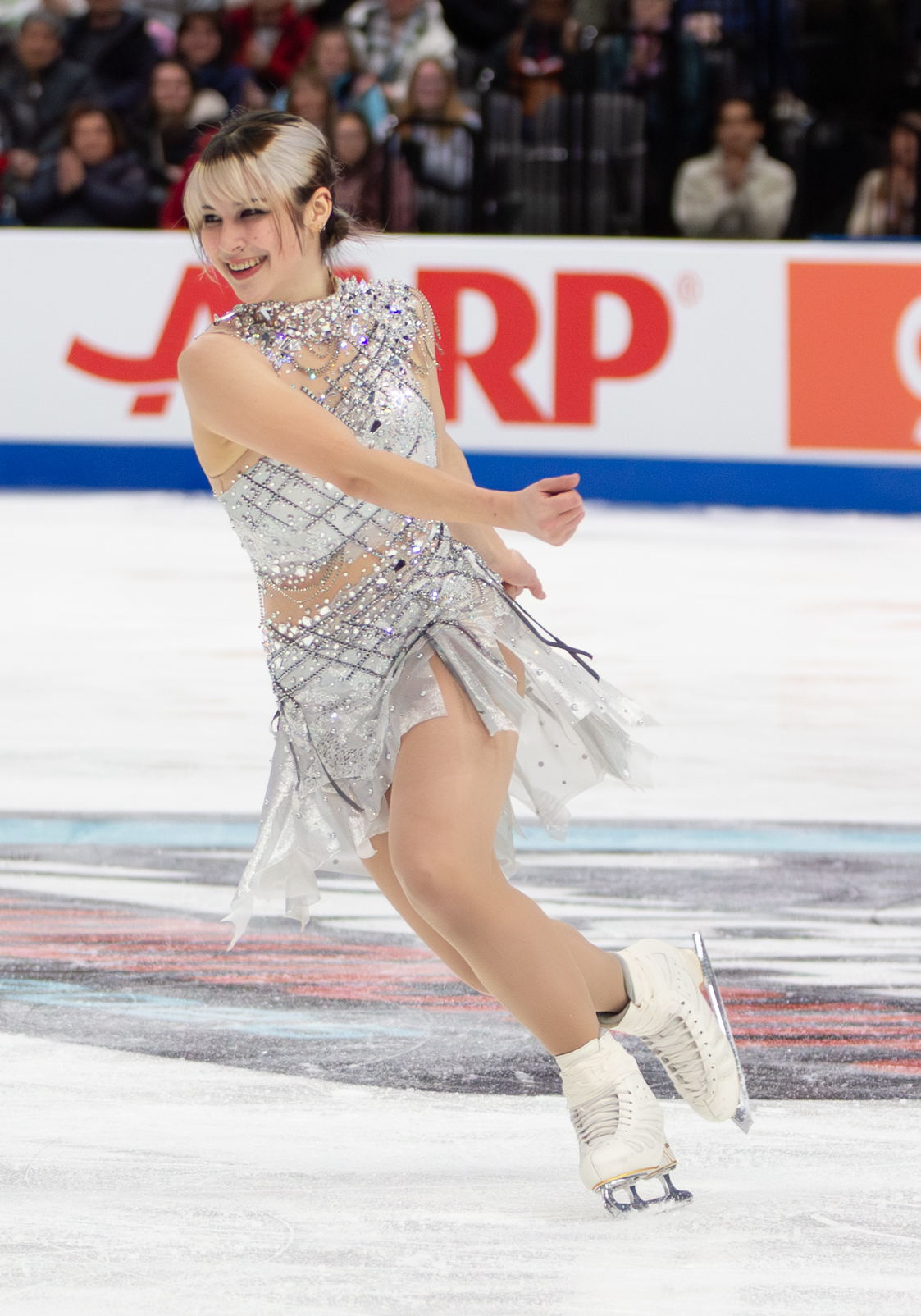
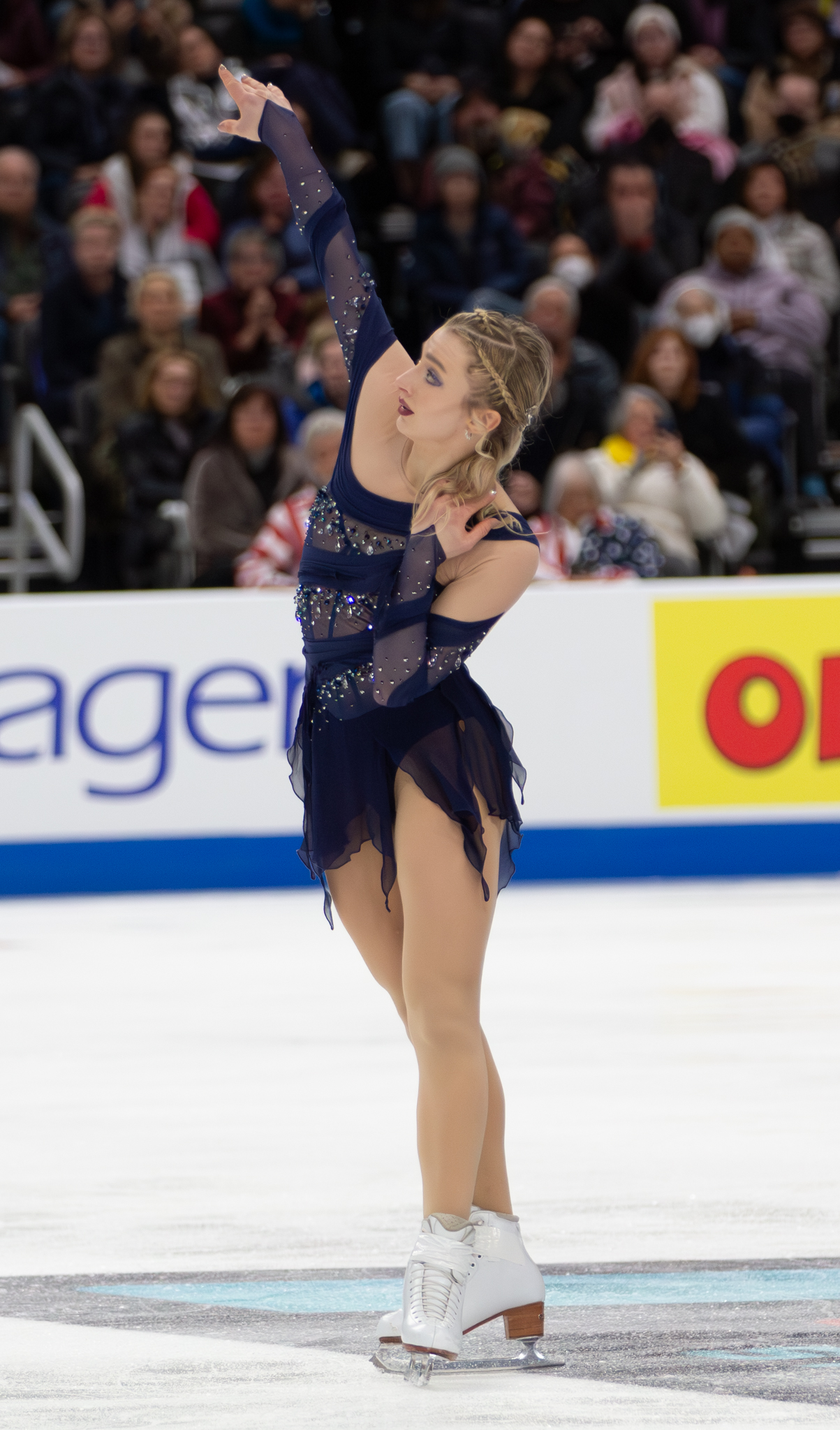
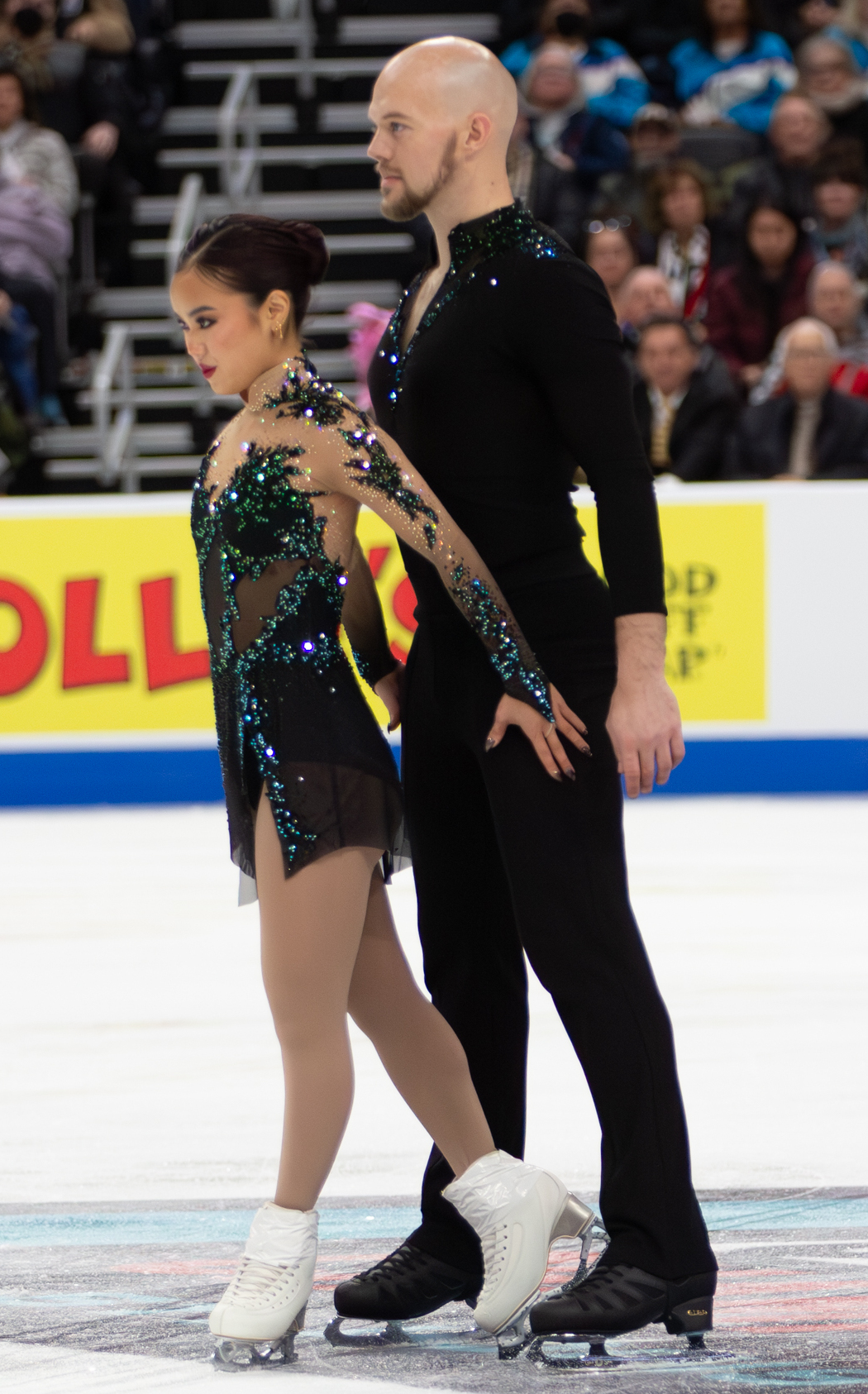
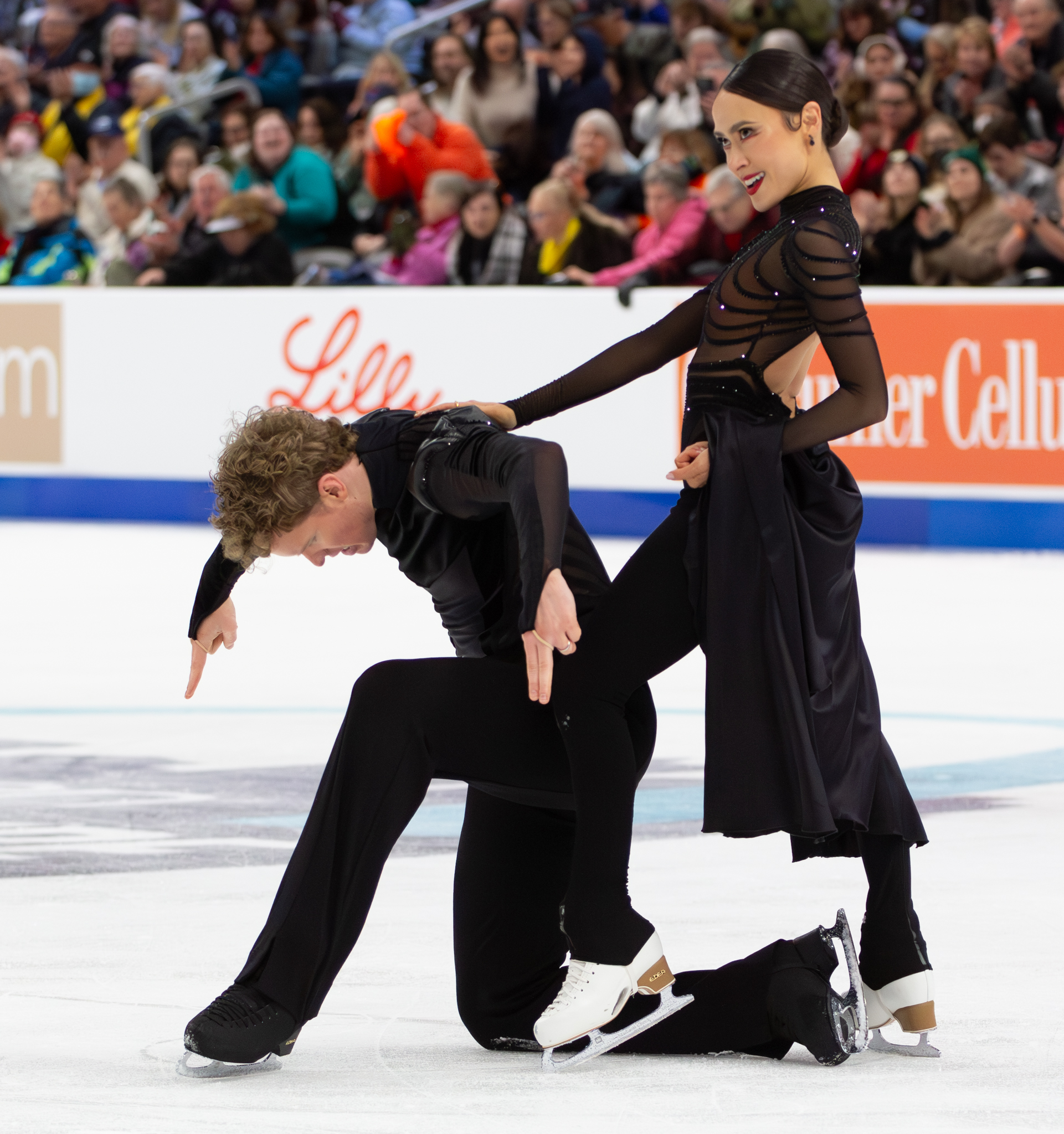
The U.S. figure skating team and gold medalists from the 2026 Winter Olympics (from left to right):
Ilia Malinin; Alysa Liu; Amber Glenn; Ellie Kam and Daniel O'Shea; and Madison Chock and Evan Bates

== Results (qualifying round) ==
Code key

- TSS – Total Segment Score
- TES – Total Elements Score
- PCS – Program Component Score
- CO – Composition
- PR – Presentation
- SS – Skating skills
- DED – Deductions

=== Ice dance ===
The team competition began on 6 February with the rhythm dance. Madison Chock and Evan Bates of the United States won the segment, earning a score of 91.06. Laurence Fournier Beaudry and Guillaume Cizeron of France, having recently won the 2026 European Figure Skating Championships, finished in second place. Fournier Beaudry and Cizeron had announced their new partnership in March 2025 with a stated goal of competing at the 2026 Winter Olympics. Lilah Fear and Lewis Gibson of Great Britain finished in third place with what Talia Barrington of NBC Sports described as an "energetic, crowd-pleasing performance". Charlène Guignard and Marco Fabbri of Italy, having already indicated that this would be their last season in competitive skating, finished in fifth place.

Rhythm dance results
Pl.	Team	Nation	TSS	TES	PCS	CO	PR	SS	Pts.
1	Madison Chock; Evan Bates	United States	91.06	52.77	38.29	9.61	9.68	9.50	10
2	Laurence Fournier Beaudry; Guillaume Cizeron	France	89.98	51.74	38.24	9.68	9.57	9.50	9
3	Lilah Fear; Lewis Gibson	Great Britain	86.85	50.08	36.77	9.25	9.36	9.04	8
4	Piper Gilles; Paul Poirier	Canada	85.79	48.74	37.05	9.32	9.32	9.21	7
5	Charlène Guignard; Marco Fabbri	Italy	83.54	47.39	36.15	9.00	9.14	9.04	6
6	Diana Davis; Gleb Smolkin	Georgia	78.97	44.81	34.16	8.54	8.64	8.50	5
7	Hannah Lim; Ye Quan	South Korea	70.55	39.54	31.01	7.79	7.82	7.71	4
8	Utana Yoshida; Masaya Morita	Japan	68.64	38.66	29.98	7.54	7.64	7.36	3
9	Wang Shiyue; Liu Xinyu	China	64.92	35.50	29.42	7.29	7.50	7.32	2
10	Sofiia Dovhal; Wiktor Kulesza	Poland	60.23	33.01	27.22	6.79	7.04	6.64	1

=== Pairs ===
The pairs short program was held on 6 February. Riku Miura and Ryuichi Kihara of Japan, the reigning world champions, finished in first place by a significant margin. Their performance featured a triple toe loop and triple Lutz throw. Anastasiia Metelkina and Luka Berulava of Georgia finished in second place. "Everything went well for us in training," Metelkina said. "We had a really good week ahead of the Olympics so we went out calmly and did what we had to do." Sara Conti and Niccolò Macii of Italy finished in third place with their flamenco program. Conti successfully performed a triple Salchow despite suffering a knee injury in January. "I am happy we managed to have fun despite everything," Conti stated afterward. "It was a great emotion to hear the Italian fans from start to finish." Macii added: "We've done our best, that's the important thing, that everyone does their best."

Pairs' short program results
Pl.	Team	Nation	TSS	TES	PCS	CO	PR	SS	DED	Pts.
1	Riku Miura; Ryuichi Kihara	Japan	82.84	45.60	37.24	9.25	9.39	9.36	0.00	10
2	Anastasiia Metelkina; Luka Berulava	Georgia	77.54	42.74	34.80	8.71	8.64	8.82	0.00	9
3	Sara Conti; Niccolò Macii	Italy	76.65	41.47	35.18	8.89	8.89	8.68	0.00	8
4	Lia Pereira; Trennt Michaud	Canada	68.24	37.12	31.12	7.86	7.79	7.75	0.00	7
5	Ellie Kam; Daniel O'Shea	United States	66.59	35.57	32.02	8.11	8.00	7.96	1.00	6
6	Sui Wenjing; Han Cong	China	65.37	34.16	32.21	8.25	7.93	8.04	1.00	5
7	Camille Kovalev; Pavel Kovalev	France	63.72	35.03	28.69	7.25	7.21	7.11	0.00	4
8	Ioulia Chtchetinina; Michał Woźniak	Poland	60.20	32.64	27.56	7.00	6.93	6.79	0.00	3
9	Anastasia Vaipan-Law; Luke Digby	Great Britain	57.29	30.31	27.98	7.14	6.93	6.96	1.00	2
10	No pairs team	South Korea	Did not enter a pairs team in competition							0

=== Women's singles ===
The women's short program was held on 6 February. Kaori Sakamoto of Japan, who had previously announced that she would retire at the end of the season, finished in first place, setting a new personal best score for the season. Sakamoto's performance was described by Lena Smirnova and Shintaro Kano of Olympics.com as "dazzling", earning top levels on her spins and step sequence. "I thought I skated really well for my first performance at this Olympics," Sakamoto said in an interview. "I was my usual self. I was nervous like I always am, but it wasn't to a point where my legs were shaking." Alysa Liu of the United States, who had retired from skating after the 2022 Winter Olympics only to return two years later, finished in second place, while Lara Naki Gutmann of Italy finished in third. Gutmann set a new personal best score, surpassing 70 points in the short program for the first time in her career. A technical error with her music forced Madeline Schizas of Canada to restart her program, and she ultimately finished in sixth place.

Women's short program results
Pl.	Skater	Nation	TSS	TES	PCS	CO	PR	SS	Pts.
1	Kaori Sakamoto	Japan	78.88	41.97	36.91	9.25	9.21	9.29	10
2	Alysa Liu	United States	74.90	39.52	35.38	8.86	9.04	8.71	9
3	Lara Naki Gutmann	Italy	71.62	38.28	33.34	8.43	8.39	8.25	8
4	Shin Ji-a	South Korea	68.80	37.93	30.87	7.75	7.57	7.89	7
5	Anastasiia Gubanova	Georgia	67.79	35.24	32.55	8.18	8.29	8.00	6
6	Madeline Schizas	Canada	64.97	34.43	30.54	7.57	7.82	7.57	5
7	Lorine Schild	France	62.24	34.74	27.50	6.93	6.89	6.86	4
8	Zhang Ruiyang	China	59.83	33.08	26.75	6.79	6.57	6.75	3
9	Ekaterina Kurakova	Poland	57.76	29.37	28.39	7.07	7.39	6.89	2
10	Kristen Spours	Great Britain	48.28	24.10	24.18	6.14	6.04	6.00	1

=== Men's singles ===
The men's short program was held on 7 February. Yuma Kagiyama, who had won the silver medal at the 2022 Winter Olympics, finished in first place after performing a pair of what Dave Skretta of the Associated Press described as "near-perfect" quadruple jumps, scoring 108.67 points in the process. He scored ten points ahead of Ilia Malinin of the United States, who was considered the presumptive front-runner for an Olympic gold medal. Kagiyama's performance included a quadruple toe loop-triple toe loop jump combination, a quadruple Salchow, and a "peerless" triple Axel. Of being considered the favorite to win, Malinin admitted that it was a lot of pressure, "and it's honestly something that I've expected to do coming to these Olympics. But overall, just looking at it, I just need to pace myself correctly … and do what I need to do." Malinin's short program featured a quadruple flip and a quadruple Lutz-triple toe loop jump combination. Stephen Gogolev of Canada finished in third place, guaranteeing that Canada would move on to the second round of competition with a new personal best score of 92.99.

Men's short program results
Pl.	Skater	Nation	TSS	TES	PCS	CO	PR	SS	Pts.
1	Yuma Kagiyama	Japan	108.67	61.12	47.55	9.43	9.50	9.54	10
2	Ilia Malinin	United States	98.00	52.62	45.38	9.11	9.14	8.93	9
3	Stephen Gogolev	Canada	92.99	53.63	39.36	7.96	7.79	7.82	8
4	Kévin Aymoz	France	88.05	43.74	44.31	8.75	9.07	8.71	7
5	Daniel Grassl	Italy	87.54	46.58	40.96	8.18	8.21	8.14	6
6	Nika Egadze	Georgia	84.37	44.22	40.15	8.04	7.89	8.11	5
7	Jin Boyang	China	84.15	45.20	38.95	7.64	7.86	7.82	4
8	Cha Jun-hwan	South Korea	83.53	41.78	41.75	8.21	8.25	8.54	3
9	Vladimir Samoilov	Poland	80.47	43.26	37.21	7.21	7.57	7.50	2
10	Edward Appleby	Great Britain	69.68	35.91	33.77	6.75	6.86	6.61	1

=== Overall ===
Code key

- D-RD – Rhythm dance
- P-SP – Pairs' short program
- W-SP – Women's short program
- M-SP – Men's short program

Upon completion of the men's short program, the top five teams were cleared to move on to the second round of competition. The United States was in the lead with 34 points, followed by Japan, Italy, Canada, and Georgia. The bottom five teams – France, South Korea, China, Great Britain, and Poland – were eliminated from the competition.

Team event results after first round
Pl.	Nation	D-RD	P-SP	W-SP	M-SP	Pts.	Status
1	United States	10	6	9	9	34	Advanced to final round
2	Japan	3	10	10	10	33	Advanced to final round
3	Italy	6	8	8	6	28	Advanced to final round
4	Canada	7	7	5	8	27	Advanced to final round
5	Georgia	5	9	6	5	25	Advanced to final round
6	France	9	4	4	7	24	Did not advance to final round
7	South Korea	4	0	7	3	14	Did not advance to final round
8	China	2	5	3	4	14	Did not advance to final round
9	Great Britain	8	2	1	1	12	Did not advance to final round
10	Poland	1	3	2	2	8	Did not advance to final round

== Results (final round) ==
Code key

- TSS – Total Segment Score
- TES – Total Elements Score
- PCS – Program Component Score
- CO – Composition
- PR – Presentation
- SS – Skating skills
- DED – Deductions

=== Ice dance ===
The free dance was held on 7 February. Madison Chock and Evan Bates of the United States set a new season best score of 133.23 with their "Paint It Black" routine that featured both flamenco and paso doble elements. Their score was nearly ten points higher than that of Charlène Guignard and Marco Fabbri of Italy, who finished in second place, helping to solidify Italy's overall third place standing at this point in the competition. Marjorie Lajoie and Zachary Lagha of Canada ultimately finished in third place.

Free dance results
Pl.	Team	Nation	TSS	TES	PCS	CO	PR	SS	Pts.
1	Madison Chock; Evan Bates	United States	133.23	75.37	57.86	9.68	9.68	9.57	10
2	Charlène Guignard; Marco Fabbri	Italy	124.22	69.44	54.78	9.11	9.14	9.14	9
3	Marjorie Lajoie; Zachary Lagha	Canada	120.90	67.96	52.94	8.86	8.86	8.75	8
4	Diana Davis; Gleb Smolkin	Georgia	117.82	66.10	51.72	8.68	8.64	8.54	7
5	Utana Yoshida; Masaya Morita	Japan	98.55	54.75	43.80	7.36	7.25	7.29	6

=== Pairs ===
The pairs' free skate was held on 8 February. Riku Miura and Ryuichi Kihara of Japan scored a new personal best in the free skate by over eight points to finish in first place. "This season, our base is just much higher than it used to be," Kihara stated. "So it's not so much our form at the moment, but we're just showing in competition who we are fundamentally." Anastasiia Metelkina and Luka Berulava of Georgia finished in second place, while Sara Conti and Niccolò Macii of Italy finished in third. Ellie Kam and Daniel O'Shea of the United States finished in fourth place, setting a new personal best that outscored Lia Pereira and Trennt Michaud of Canada, who had been expected to finish ahead of them. "That was the most fantastic skate I've seen from them," said Johnny Weir, figure skater commentator for NBC, "absolutely stunning from start to finish."

Pairs' free skate results
Pl.	Team	Nation	TSS	TES	PCS	CO	PR	SS	DED	Pts.
1	Riku Miura; Ryuichi Kihara	Japan	155.55	80.88	74.67	9.29	9.29	9.39	0.00	10
2	Anastasiia Metelkina; Luka Berulava	Georgia	139.70	72.80	67.90	8.46	8.36	8.61	1.00	9
3	Sara Conti; Niccolò Macii	Italy	136.61	67.85	68.76	8.64	8.61	8.5	0.00	8
4	Ellie Kam; Daniel O'Shea	United States	135.36	69.65	65.71	8.18	8.25	8.18	0.00	7
5	Lia Pereira; Trennt Michaud	Canada	134.42	69.19	65.23	8.18	8.21	8.04	0.00	6

=== Women's singles ===
The women's free skate was held on 8 February. Kaori Sakamoto of Japan finished in first place, earning ten points for Japan and tying the competition between Japan and the United States. Sakamoto's performance featured ten jumps, including six triple jumps, and earned top scores for her spins and step sequence. Anastasiia Gubanova of Georgia finished in second place, successfully performing seven triple jumps and earning top scores on all of her spins. "I was happy not to let down the team," Gubanova stated. "That's the most important thing right now, to try to give [Georgia] as many chances as possible to fight for a medal." Amber Glenn of the United States finished in third place, and despite an unstable landing on her triple Axel, she gained momentum as her performance progressed.

Women's free skate results
Pl.	Skater	Nation	TSS	TES	PCS	CO	PR	SS	DED	Pts.
1	Kaori Sakamoto	Japan	148.62	72.93	75.69	9.39	9.39	9.57	0.00	10
2	Anastasiia Gubanova	Georgia	140.17	73.24	66.93	8.32	8.54	8.21	0.00	9
3	Amber Glenn	United States	138.62	70.91	67.71	8.39	8.36	8.61	0.00	8
4	Lara Naki Gutmann	Italy	126.94	61.16	65.78	8.39	8.11	8.14	0.00	7
5	Madeline Schizas	Canada	125.00	65.44	60.56	7.50	7.61	7.57	1.00	6

=== Men's singles ===
The men's free skate was held on 8 February. Ilia Malinin of the United States won the competition, performing five quadruple jumps and earning a score of 200.03, thereby clinching the gold medals for the American team. The United States and Japan had entered this last segment of the competition tied with 59 points each: a situation that Malinin savored. "I felt really proud of that attention, that pressure, because to see that it was going to be a tie, and that the deciding factor was going to be my skate, I really went out there and just decided, 'Okay, let the nerves down. You really need to ... just let things happen.'" Shun Sato performed what Kiki Intarasuwan of CBS News described as the "routine of a lifetime", but it was not enough for Japan to win the event. Sato's performance included three quadruple jumps and earned positive scores on all of his elements. "Being honest, I was clinging on to hope that I could outscore Ilia," Sato said, "but he's a skater on a whole other level, so I just wanted to get as close as I could to him." Matteo Rizzo of Italy delivered what Nick McCarvel of Olympics.com termed a "sparkling performance" to secure the bronze medals for the Italian team. Rizzo fell to the ice upon completion of his routine as the arena filled with applause.

Men's free skate results
Pl.	Skater	Nation	TSS	TES	PCS	CO	PR	SS	Pts.
1	Ilia Malinin	United States	200.03	110.32	89.71	8.79	9.04	9.11	10
2	Shun Sato	Japan	194.86	106.49	88.37	8.79	8.71	9.04	9
3	Matteo Rizzo	Italy	179.62	92.57	87.05	8.61	8.96	8.57	8
4	Stephen Gogolev	Canada	171.93	92.37	79.56	8.00	7.96	7.93	7
5	Nika Egadze	Georgia	154.79	78.33	76.46	7.75	7.46	7.75	6

=== Overall ===
Code key

- D-RD – Rhythm dance
- P-SP – Pairs' short program
- W-SP – Women's short program
- M-SP – Men's short program
- D-FD – Free dance
- P-FS – Pairs' free skate
- W-FS – Women's free skate
- M-FS – Men's free skate

Team event results after second round
Pl.	Nation	D-RD	P-SP	W-SP	M-SP	D-FD	P-FS	W-FS	M-FS	Pts.
1st place, gold medalist(s)	United States	10	6	9	9	10	7	8	10	69
2nd place, silver medalist(s)	Japan	3	10	10	10	6	10	10	9	68
3rd place, bronze medalist(s)	Italy	6	8	8	6	9	8	7	8	60
4	Georgia	5	9	6	5	7	9	9	6	56
5	Canada	7	7	5	8	8	6	6	7	54

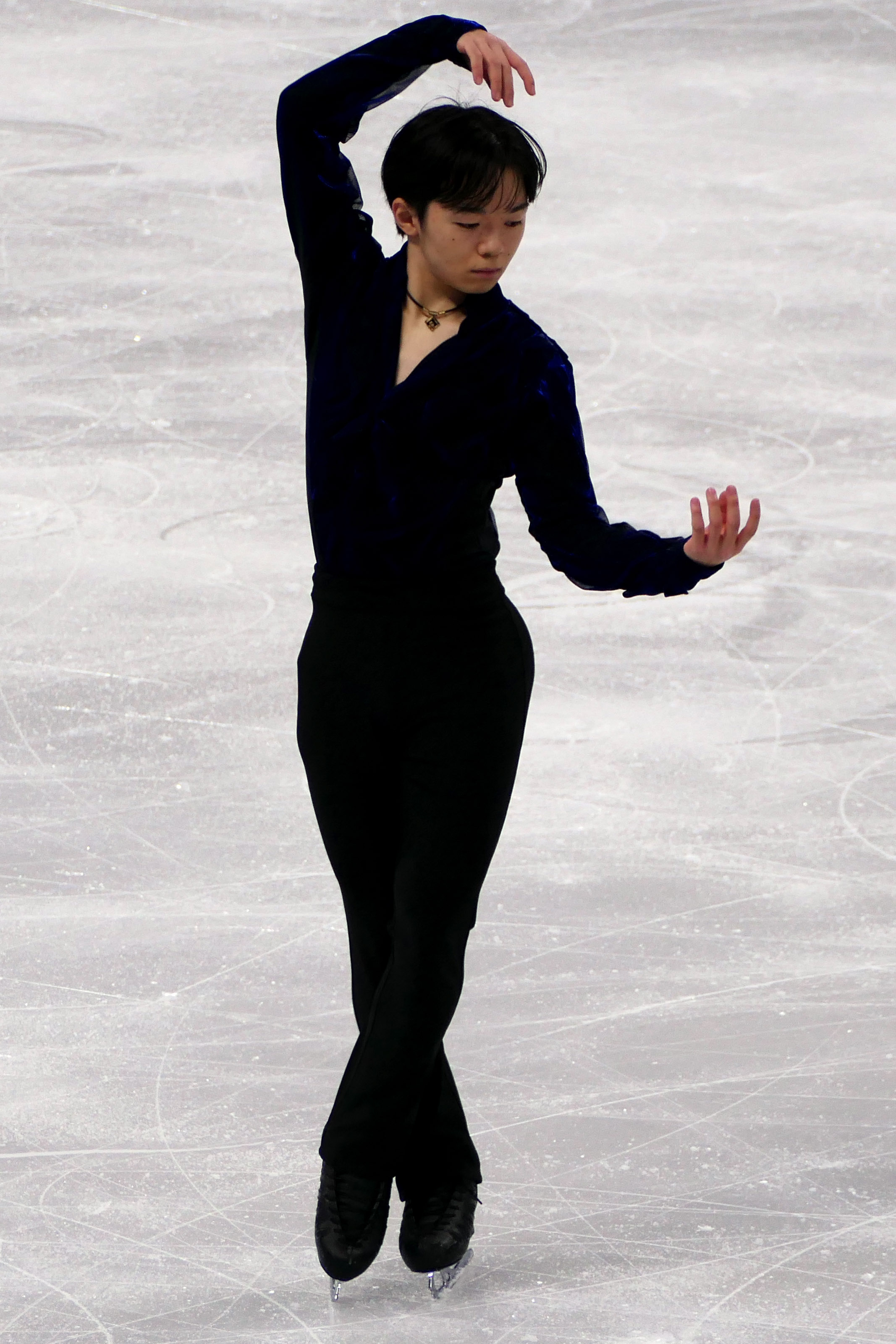
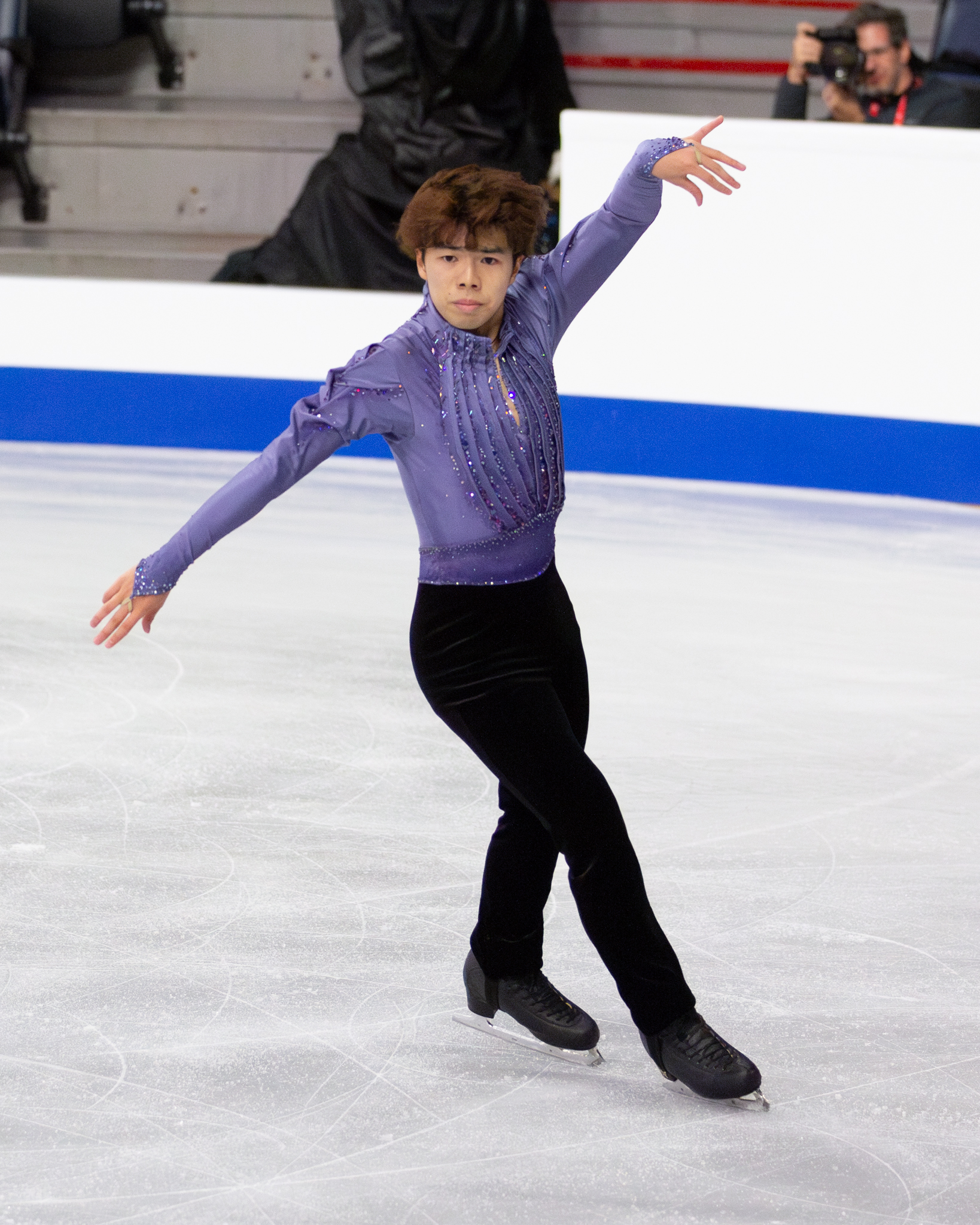
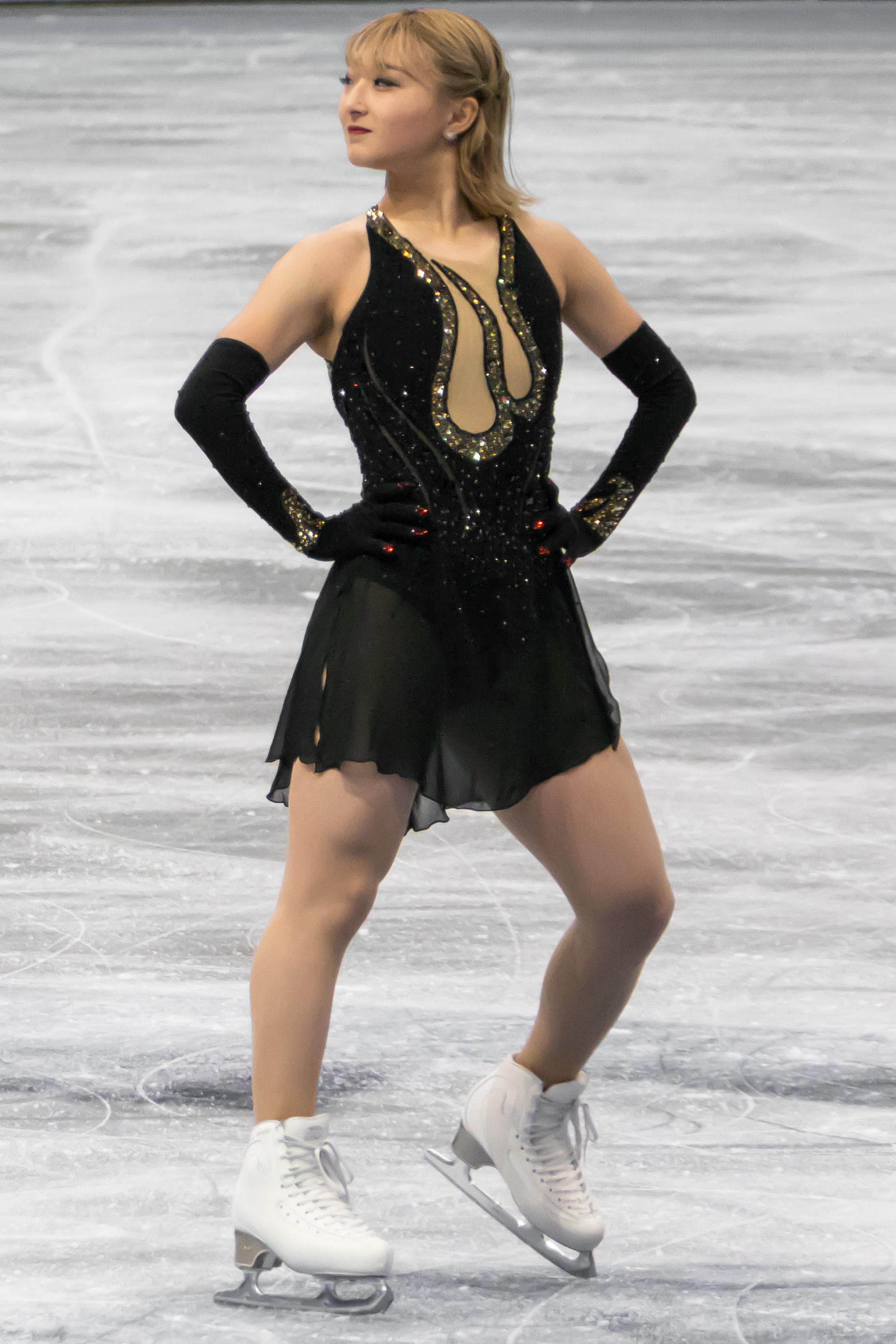
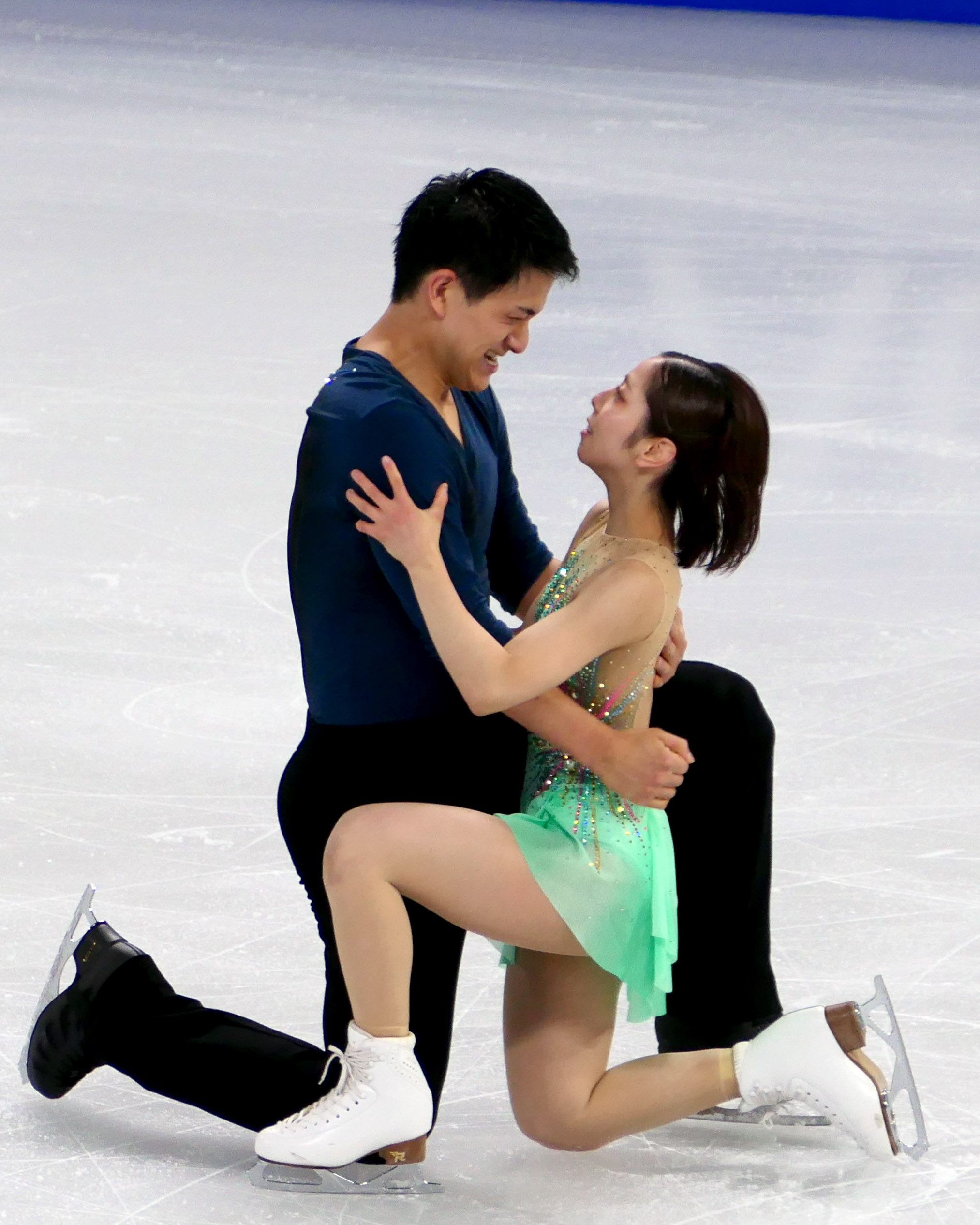
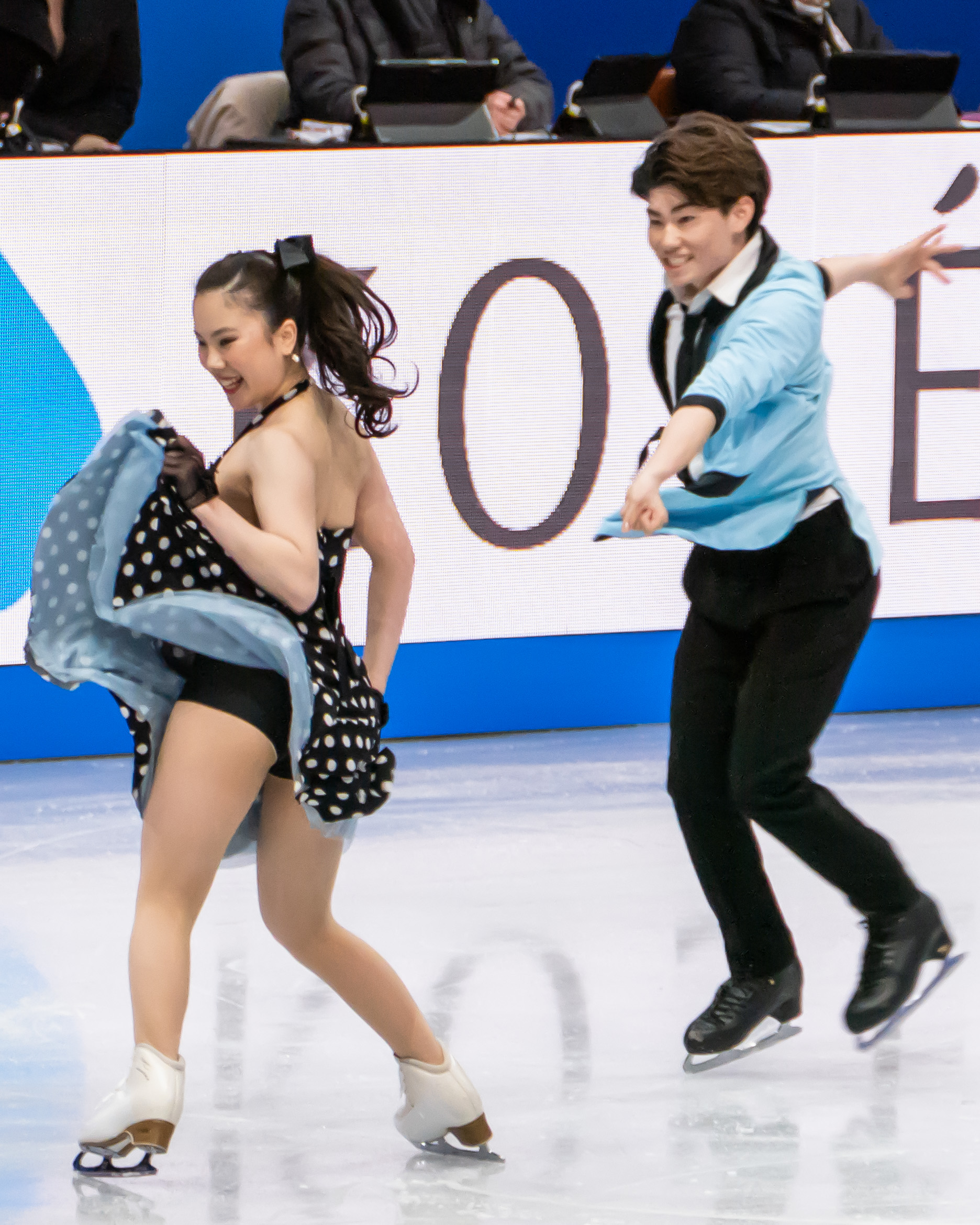
The Japanese figure skating team and silver medalists from the 2026 Winter Olympics (from left to right):
Yuma Kagiyama; Shun Sato; Kaori Sakamoto; Riku Miura and Ryuichi Kihara; and Utana Yoshida and Masaya Morita
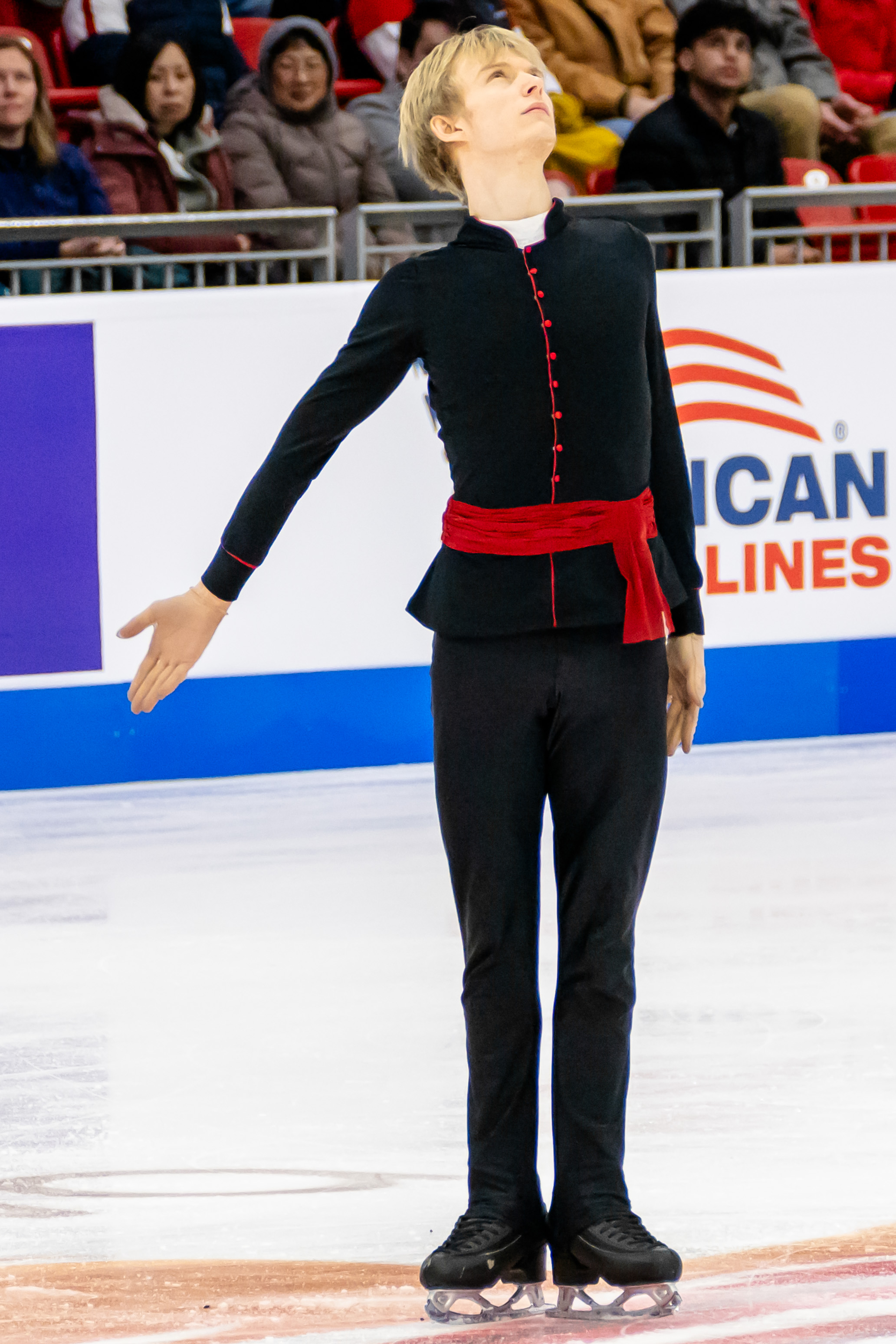
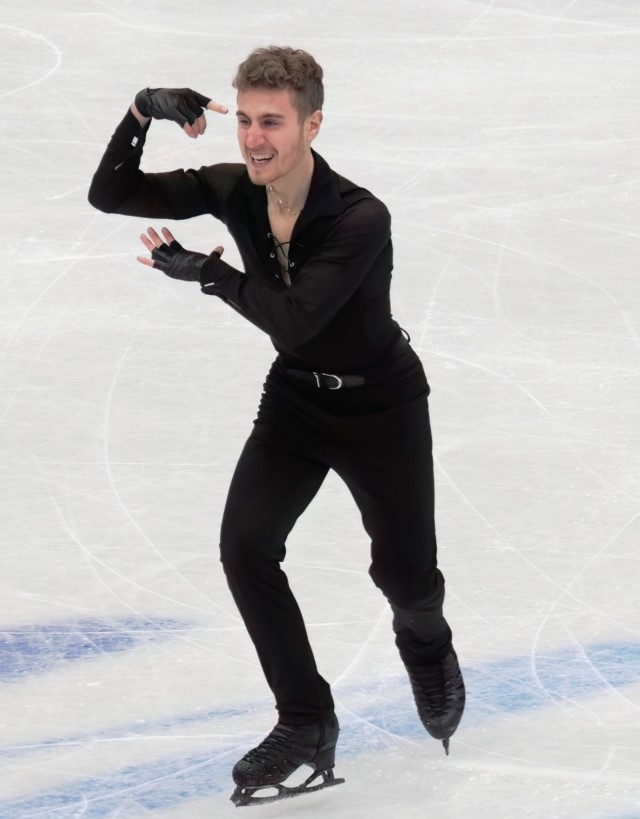
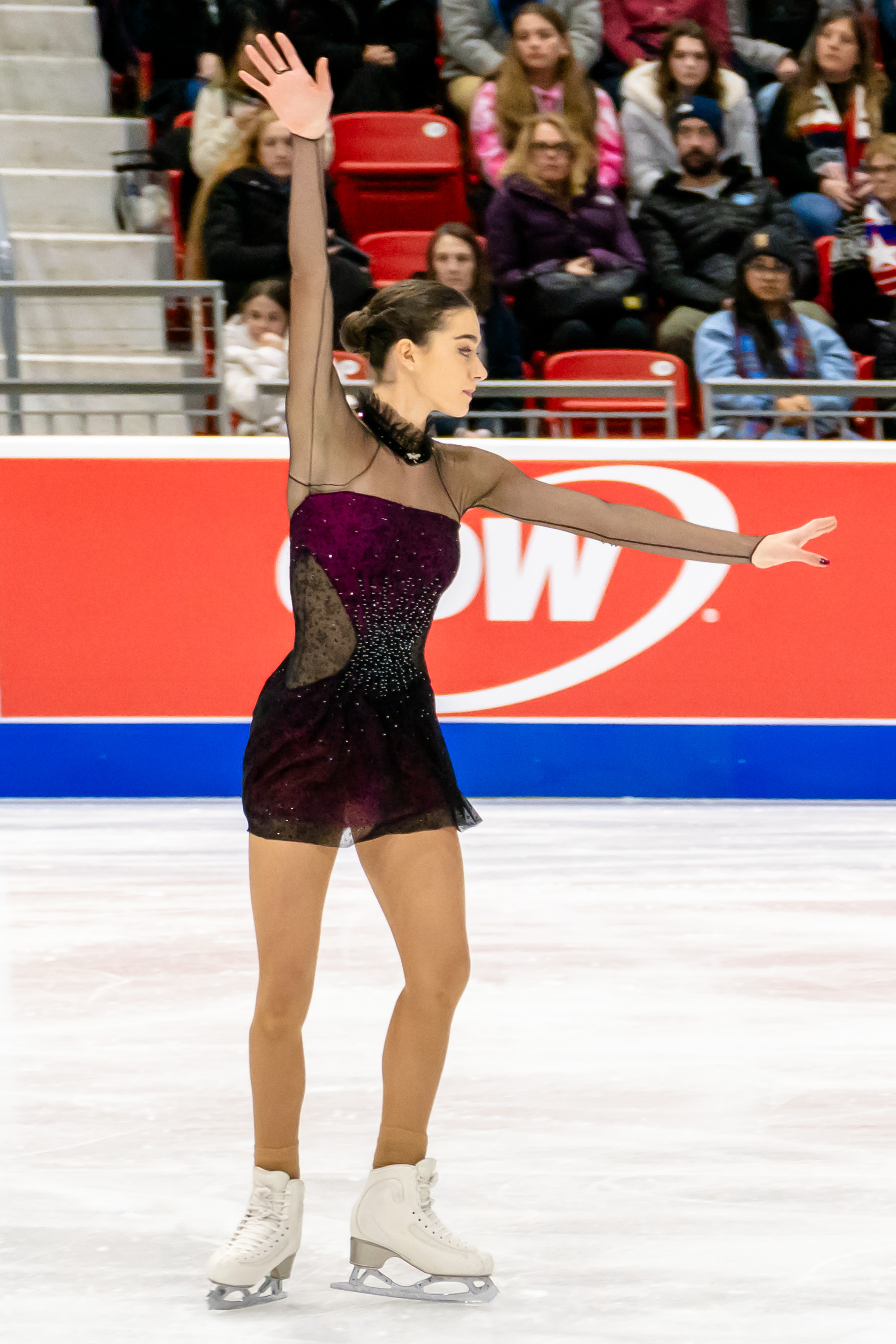
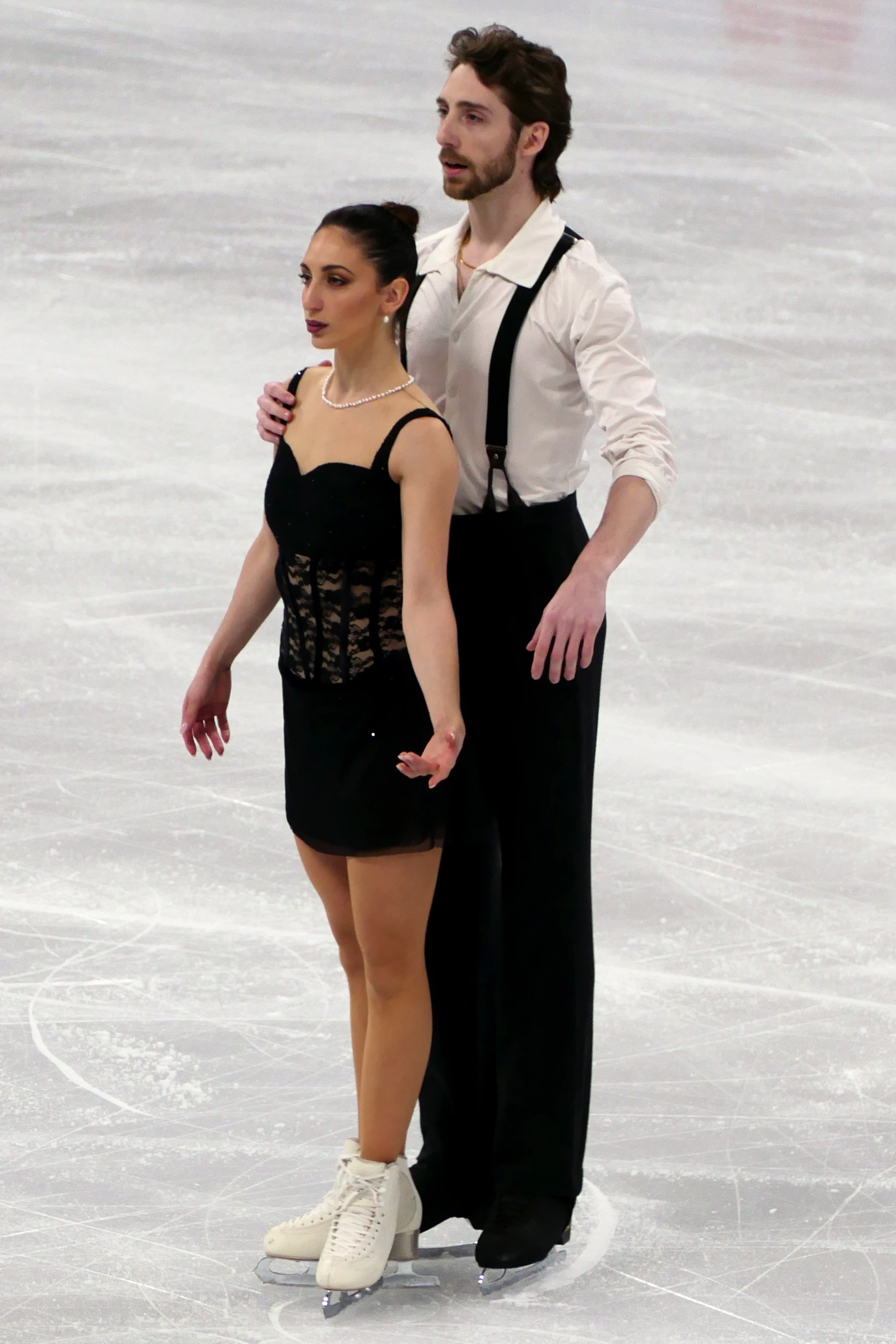
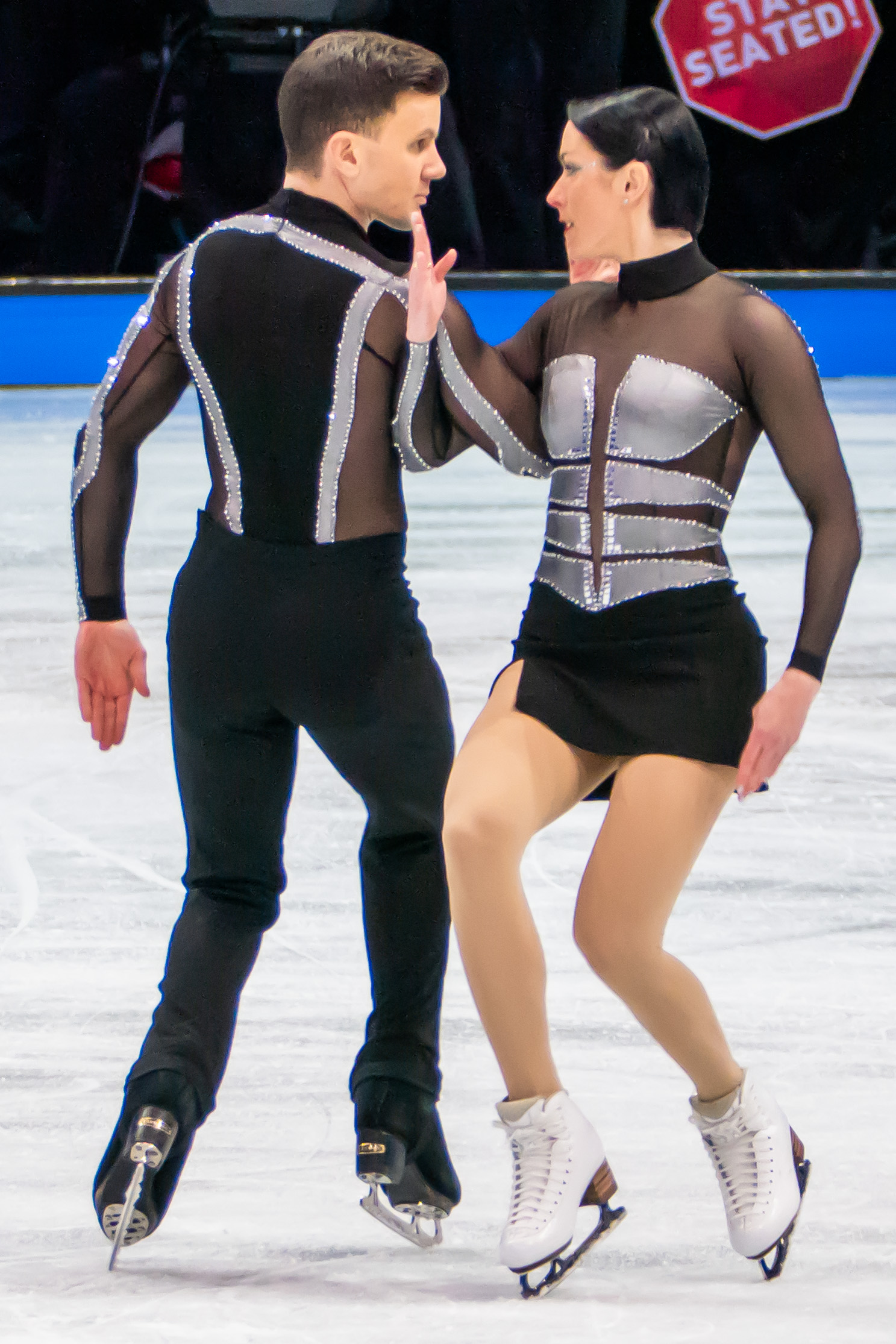
The Italian figure skating team and bronze medalists from the 2026 Winter Olympics (from left to right):
Daniel Grassl; Matteo Rizzo; Lara Naki Gutmann; Sara Conti and Niccolò Macii; and Charlène Guignard and Marco Fabbri

== Works cited ==
- "Special Regulations & Technical Rules – Single & Pair Skating and Ice Dance 2024" (PDF). International Skating Union. Archived (PDF) from the original on 3 June 2025.
