= Georgia at the 2010 Winter Olympics =

- Flag of Georgia
- IOC code: GEO
- NOC: Georgian National Olympic Committee
- Website: www.geonoc.org.ge (in Georgian and English)

in Vancouver
- Competitors: 8 in 3 sports
- Flag bearer: Iason Abramashvili (Opening) Elene Gedevanishvili (Closing)
- Medals: Gold 0 Silver 0 Bronze 0 Total 0

Winter Olympics appearances (overview)
- 1994; 1998; 2002; 2006; 2010; 2014; 2018; 2022; 2026; 2030

Other related appearances
- Soviet Union (1956–1988)

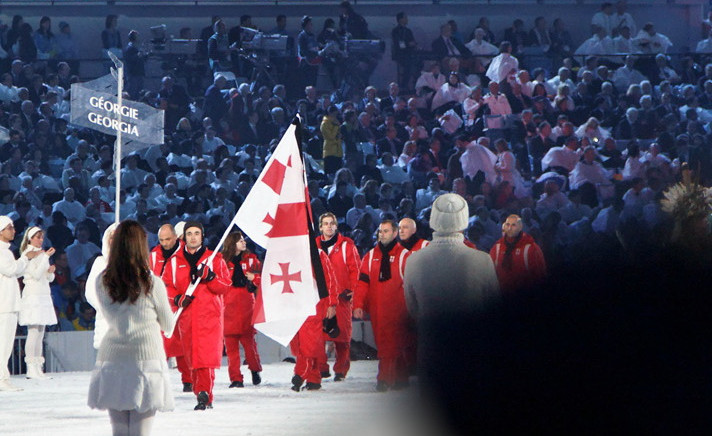
Iason Abramashvili carrying the Georgian flag into the Opening Ceremonies

Georgia participated in the 2010 Winter Olympics in Vancouver, British Columbia, Canada. It marked the fifth time since gaining independence that Georgia sent a delegation, though it had previously competed since 1952 as a member of the Soviet Union. Eight athletes competed in three sports, with none of them winning a medal. On the day of the opening ceremony, Georgian luger Nodar Kumaritashvili died in an accident while practicing for the games.

== Alpine skiing ==
Three athletes competed in skiing events: Iason Abramashvili and Jaba Gelashvili in both men's giant slalom and slalom, and Nino Tsiklauri in women's giant slalom and slalom.

Athlete	Event	Final			
Athlete	Event	Run 1	Run 2	Total	Rank
Iason Abramashvili	Men's giant slalom	1:21.85	1:25.38	2:47.23	46
Iason Abramashvili	Men's slalom	51.89	DSQ		
Jaba Gelashvili	Men's giant slalom	1:23.61	1:26.71	2:50.32	50
Jaba Gelashvili	Men's slalom	DNF			
Nino Tsiklauri	Women's giant slalom	DNF			
Nino Tsiklauri	Women's slalom	59.77	1:02.55	2:02.32	50

== Figure skating ==
Three athletes competed in two figure skating events for Georgia: Elene Gedevanishvili competed in ladies' singles, while Allison Reed and Otar Japaridze competed in ice dancing.

Reed and Japaridze qualified for the Olympics at the 2009 Nebelhorn Trophy, where they placed twelfth. Reed, originally from the United States, became a Georgian citizen in January 2010. They finished 22nd overall at the Olympics.

Athlete(s)	Event	CD		SP/OD		FS/FD		Total	
Athlete(s)	Event	Points	Rank	Points	Rank	Points	Rank	Points	Rank
Elene Gedevanishvili	Ladies'			61.92	9	93.32	17	155.24	14
Allison Reed / Otar Japaridze	Ice dancing	26.65	20	42.22	21	63.45	22	132.32	22

== Luge ==
Two athletes were qualified for the luge, with both Levan Gureshidze and Nodar Kumaritashvili set to make their Olympics' debut. However, on February 12, the day of the Opening Ceremony, Kumaritashvili crashed during a training run and was killed. The Whistler Sliding Centre, which recorded some of the fastest speeds in luge, experienced several accidents occurred during training runs leading up to the start of the games. Going into the final turn of the course at speeds of 143 kilometres per hour (89 mph), he crashed into the side of the turn, sending him into a steel support pillar, and died shortly after. The International Luge Federation immediately called an emergency meeting after the incident, and all other training runs were called off for the day. Saying he "couldn't go on," Gureshidze withdrew from the competition out of respect for his teammate.

Athlete	Event	Final					
Athlete	Event	Run 1	Run 2	Run 3	Run 4	Total	Rank
Levan Gureshidze	Men's singles	withdrew					
Nodar Kumaritashvili	Men's singles	died in an accident during training					
