= Sofia Akhmeteli =

Georgian alpine skier (born 1981)

Personal information
- Born: 28 March 1981

Sport
- Country: Georgia
- Sport: Alpine Skiing

Sofia Akhmeteli (Georgian: სოფია ახმეტელი; born 28 March 1981) is a former Georgian alpine skier. She competed at the 1998 Winter Olympics and in the 2002 Winter Olympics representing Georgia.

Sofia was also the flagbearer for Georgia in 1998 Winter Olympics and in the 2002 Winter Olympics.
