= Georgia at the 2026 Winter Olympics =

- Flag of Georgia
- IOC code: GEO
- NOC: Georgian National Olympic Committee
- Website: www.geonoc.org.ge

in Milan and Cortina d'Ampezzo, Italy 6 February 2026 – 22 February 2026
- Competitors: 8 (4 men and 4 women) in 2 sports
- Flag bearers (opening): Luka Berulava & Diana Davis
- Flag bearers (closing): Luka Berulava & Nino Tsiklauri
- Medals Ranked 25th: Gold 0 Silver 1 Bronze 0 Total 1

Winter Olympics appearances (overview)
- 1994; 1998; 2002; 2006; 2010; 2014; 2018; 2022; 2026

Other related appearances
- Soviet Union (1956–1988)

Georgia competed at the 2026 Winter Olympics in Milan and Cortina d'Ampezzo, Italy, from 6 to 22 February 2026.

The Georgian team consisted of eight athletes (four per gender) competing in two sports: alpine skiing and figure skating. Figure skaters Luka Berulava and Diana Davis were the country's flagbearer during the opening ceremony. Meanwhile, Luka Berulava and Nino Tsiklauri were the country's flagbearer during the closing ceremony.

On 16 February, Luka Berulava and Anastasiia Metelkina won the silver medal in the figure skating pairs event, marking the country's first ever Winter Olympic medal.

== Competitors ==
The following is the list of number of competitors participating at the Games per sport/discipline.

Sport	Men	Women	Total
Alpine skiing	1	1	2
Figure skating	3	3	6
Total	4	4	8

== Medalists ==
The following Georgian competitors won medals at the games. In the discipline sections below, the medalists' names are bolded.

Medal	Name	Sport	Event	Date
Silver	Luka Berulava; Anastasiia Metelkina	Figure skating	Pairs	16 February

== Alpine skiing ==
Georgia qualified one female and one male alpine skier through the basic quota.

Athlete	Event	Run 1		Run 2		Total	
Athlete	Event	Time	Rank	Time	Rank	Time	Rank
Luka Buchukuri	Men's giant slalom	1:28.21	61	1:20.57	51	2:48.78	56
Luka Buchukuri	Men's slalom	DNF					
Nino Tsiklauri	Women's giant slalom	1:12.39	54	1:19.40	49	2:31.79	49
Nino Tsiklauri	Women's slalom	DSQ					

== Figure skating ==
In the 2025 World Figure Skating Championships in Boston, the United States, Georgia secured one quota in each of the men's singles, the pair skating, and the ice dance. Georgia earned one quota in women's singles at the ISU Skate to Milano Figure Skating Qualifier 2025 in Beijing, China. Furthermore, Georgia qualified to the team event.

Athlete	Event	SP/SD		FP/FD		Total	
Athlete	Event	Points	Rank	Points	Rank	Points	Rank
Nika Egadze	Men's singles	85.11	15 **Q**	175.16	7	260.27	10
Anastasiia Gubanova	Women's singles	71.77	6 **Q**	138.22	11	209.99	9
**Luka Berulava**; **Anastasiia Metelkina**	Pairs	75.46	2 **Q**	146.29	2	221.75	2nd place, silver medalist(s)
Gleb Smolkin; Diana Davis	Ice dance	77.15	13 **Q**	118.87	11	196.02	13

Team event

Athlete	Event	Short program / Rhythm dance						Free skate / Free dance				Total	
Athlete	Event	Men's	Women's	Pairs	Ice dance	Total		Men's	Women's	Pairs	Ice dance	Total	
Athlete	Event	Points Team points	Points Team points	Points Team points	Points Team points	Points	Rank	Points Team points	Points Team points	Points Team points	Points Team points	Points	Rank
Nika Egadze (M); Anastasiia Gubanova (W); Anastasiia Metelkina / Luka Berulava (P); Diana Davis / Gleb Smolkin (ID)	Team event	84.37; 5	67.79; 6	77.54; 9	78.97; 5	25	5 **Q**	154.79; 6	140.17; 9	139.70; 9	117.82; 7	56	4

== See also ==
- Georgia at the 2026 Winter Paralympics
