= Saba Kumaritashvili =

Georgian luger (born 2000)

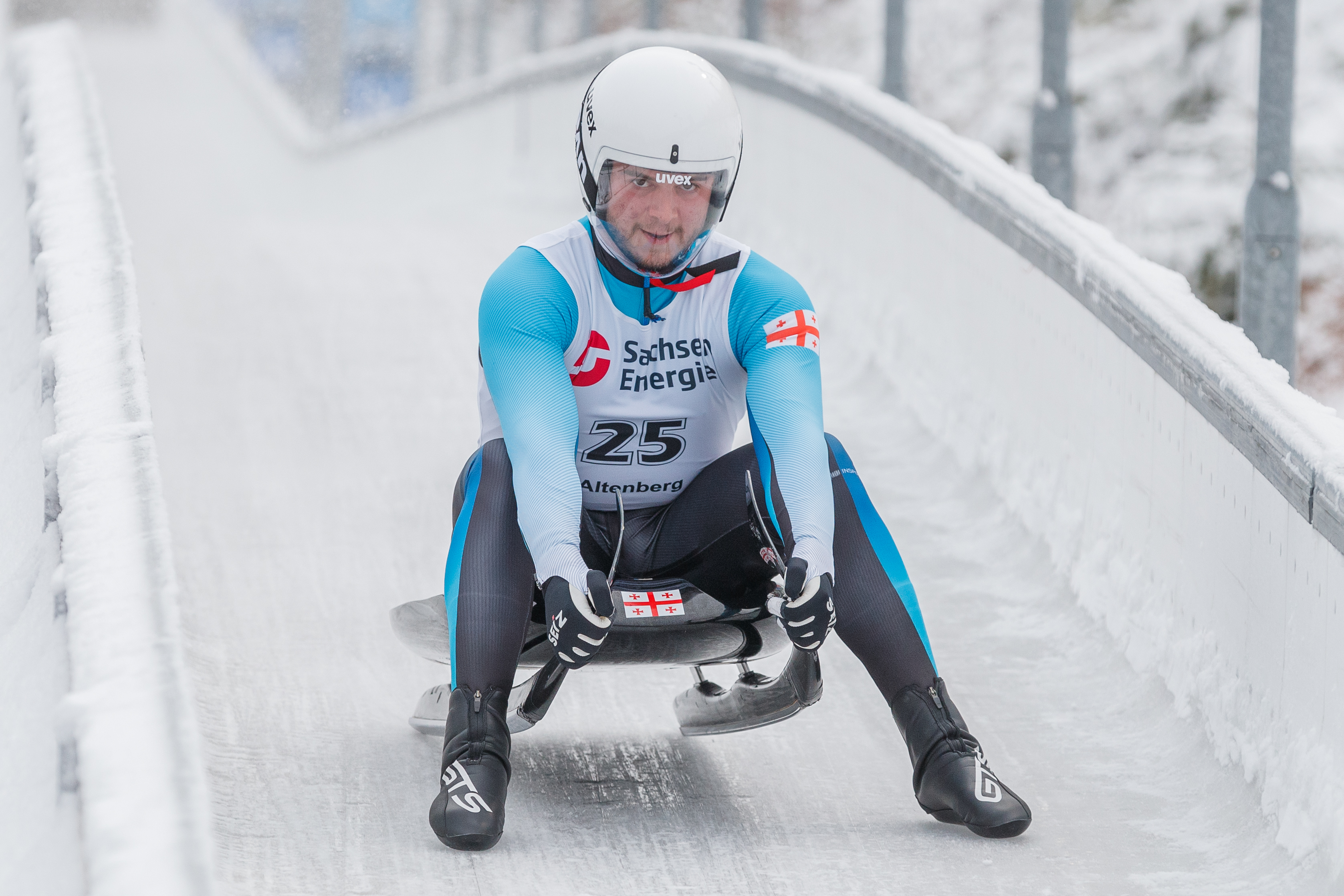

Personal information
- Born: 8 September 2000 (age 24); Tbilisi, Georgia

Sport
- Country: Georgia
- Sport: Luge

Saba Kumaritashvili (Georgian: საბა ქუმარიტაშვილი; born 8 September 2000) is a Georgian luger who competes internationally.

He represented his country at the 2022 Winter Olympics.

== Personal ==
He is the cousin of luge athlete Nodar Kumaritashvili, who suffered a fatal crash during a training run for the 2010 Winter Olympics.
