= Vakhtang Murvanidze =

Former Georgian figure skater

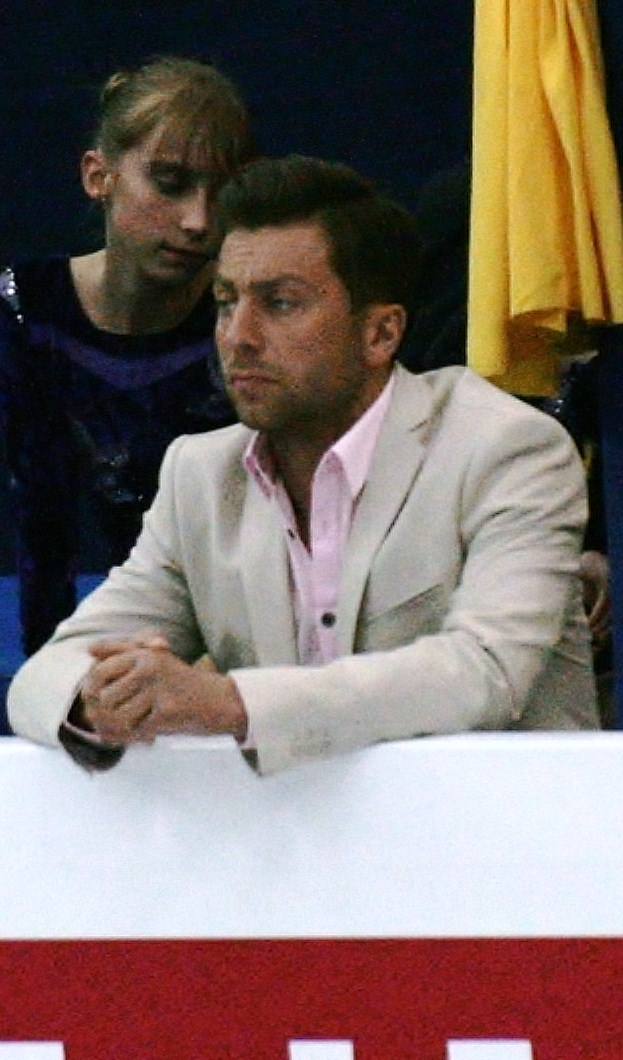

Personal information
- Born: 13 October 1979 (age 47) Tbilisi, Georgian SSR, Soviet Union
- Height: 1.74 m (5 ft 8 1/2 in)

Figure skating career
- Country: Georgia
- Skating club: Dinamo Tbilisi
- Began skating: 1983
- Retired: 2006

Vakhtang Murvanidze (Georgian: ვახტანგ მურვანიძე; born 13 October 1979 in Tbilisi) is a Georgian former competitive figure skater. He is a multiple Georgian national champion and represented Georgia twice at the Olympics, in 2002 (17th) and 2006 (28th). His highest placement at the European Championships was 7th in 2003. He was the flag bearer for Georgia at the 2006 Winter Olympics.

Early in his career, Murvanidze was coached by Leila Dolidze and Igor Rusakov. By 2001, he was with Elena Tchaikovskaya and Vladimir Kotin in Moscow. In spring 2003, he joined Alexander Zhulin in New Jersey. In his final season, 2005–06, he was coached by Craig Maurizi in New Jersey.

== Programs ==
Season	Short program	Free skating
2005–06	Armenian folk music	West Side Story by Leonard Bernstein
2004–05	Harlem Nocturne Blues by Earle Hagen	Natural Born Killers
2003–04	Take Five by Dave Brubeck	A Little Serenade by Wolfgang Amadeus Mozart arranged by A. Kremer performed by Satira Orchestra of Moscow Theatre
2002–03	Moonlight Sonata (modern version); For Elise by Ludwig van Beethoven (modern version)	A Little Serenade by Wolfgang Amadeus Mozart arranged by A. Kremer performed by Satira Orchestra of Moscow Theatre
2000–02	Csárdás	The Godfather by Nino Rota

== Results ==
GP: Grand Prix

International
Event	94–95	95–96	96–97	97–98	98–99	99–00	00–01	01–02	02–03	03–04	04–05	05–06
Olympics								17th				28th
Worlds			31st	28th	17th	25th	25th	20th	21st	28th	25th	
Europeans		27th	20th	26th	21st	16th	11th	16th	7th	17th	15th	
GP Spark./Bofrost						9th			6th			
GP Skate America									7th	6th	10th	
GP Skate Canada											11th	
Golden Spin							4th	3rd				
Schäfer Memorial				WD			1st	2nd				3rd
Nebelhorn Trophy				19th				8th				
Skate Israel						5th						
International: Junior
Junior Worlds	29th	30th	28th	21st	5th							
EYOF			2nd									
National
Georgian Champ.		2nd	1st	1st	1st	1st	1st	1st	1st	1st	1st	1st
WD: Withdrew
