= Levan Abramishvili =

Georgian alpine skier (born 1970)

Personal information
- Nationality: Georgian
- Born: 27 July 1970 (age 54); Bakuriani, Georgian SSR, Soviet Union
- Height: 1.81 m (5 ft 11 in)
- Weight: 84 kg (185 lb)

Sport
- Sport: Alpine skiing

Levan Abramishvili (Georgian: ლევან აბრამიშვილი; born 27 July 1970) is a Georgian alpine skier. He competed in the 1994 and 1998 Winter Olympics.
