= Kakhaber Tsakadze =

Georgian ski jumper

Kakhaber Tsakadze (Georgian: კახაბერ წაქაძე; born 28 January 1969 in Bakuriani) is a retired Georgian ski jumper.

He competed in the 1994 Winter Olympics in Lillehammer and the 1998 Winter Olympics in Nagano, placing between 50th and 59th in all four races. He also competed at the 1993 World Championships, the 1994 Ski Flying Championships and twice in the World Cup.

Tsakadze holds the Georgian record with 105,5 metres. He retired in 2003.
