= Zurab Dzhidzhishvili =

Georgian alpine skier (born 1973)

Personal information
- Nationality: Georgian
- Born: 23 September 1973 (age 52) Bakuriani, Georgian SSR, Soviet Union

Sport
- Sport: Alpine skiing

Zurab Dzhidzhishvili (Georgian: ზურაბ ძიძიშვილი; born 23 September 1973) is a Georgian alpine skier. He competed at the 1994 Winter Olympics and the 1998 Winter Olympics. In 1996 and 1997, he appeared at the World Alpine Ski Championships. At the 1996 Sierra Nevada championships, he was 32nd in the slalom giant and 62nd in the downhill and supergiant. At the 1997 Sestriere championships, he was 22nd in the combined, 35th in the slalom giant, 41st in the downhill, and 54th in the supergiant.
