= Nino Tsiklauri =

Georgian alpine skier (born 1993)

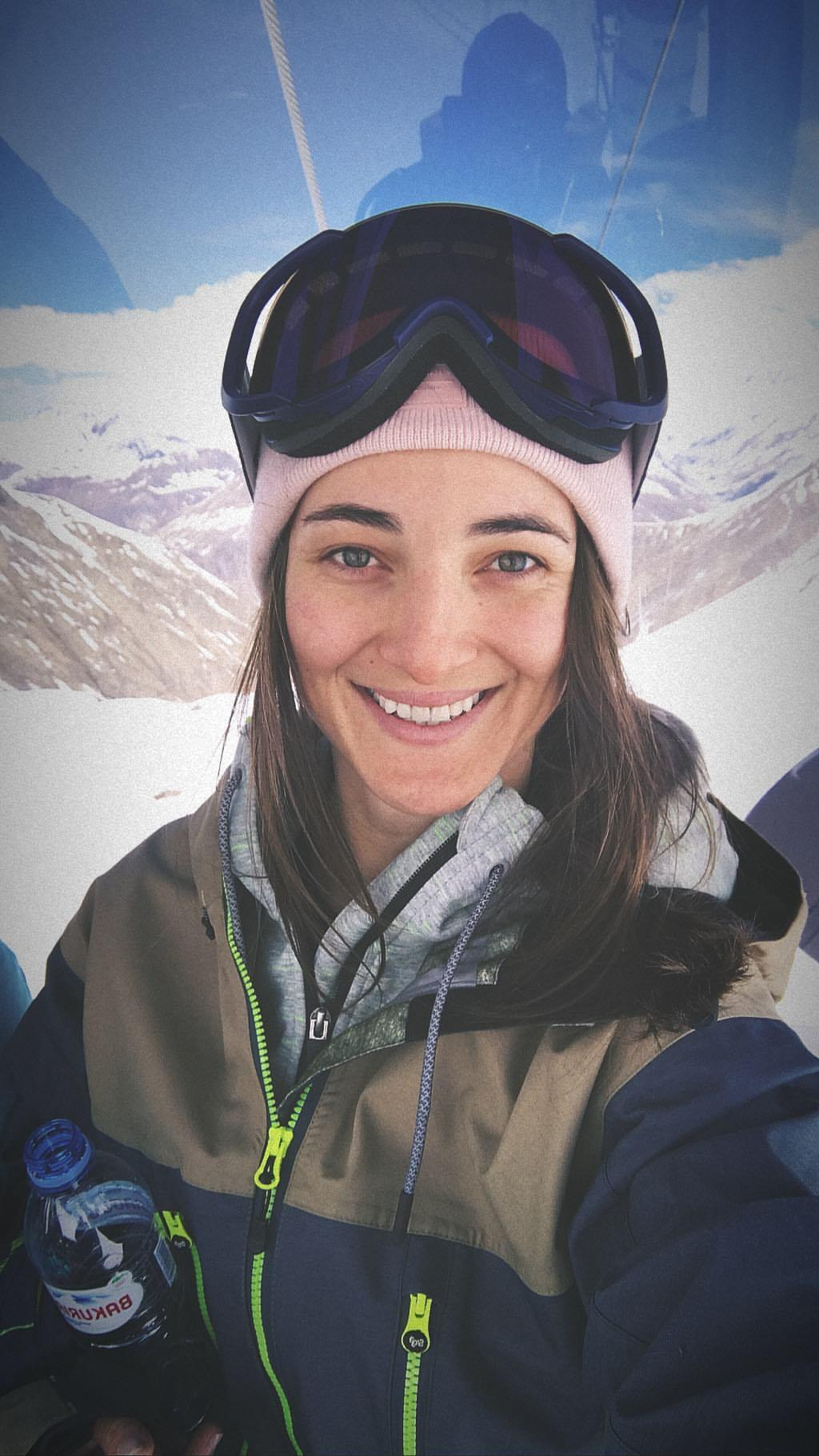
- Tsiklauri in 2019

Personal information
- Born: 1 July 1993 (age 33) Tbilisi, Georgia
- Height: 170 cm (5 ft 7 in)
- Weight: 60 kg (132 lb)

Skiing career
- Country: Georgia
- Sport: Alpine skiing
- Club: Gudauri
- Disciplines: Giant slalom, slalom
- World Cup debut: 2 February 2014 (age 18)

Olympics
- Teams: 5 – (2010–2026)
- Medals: 0

World Championships
- Teams: 8 – (2011–2025)
- Medals: 0 (0 gold)

World Cup
- Seasons: 5 – (2014, 2017–2018, 2021–2022)

Nino Tsiklauri (Georgian: ნინო წიკლაური, pronounced [nino tsʼikʼlauɾi]; born 1 July 1993) is a Georgian alpine skier. She competed for Georgia at five Winter Olympics and eight World Championships. She was the country's flag bearer at the 2014 and 2022 Winter Olympics.

== World Championships results ==
Year
Year	Age	Slalom	Giant slalom	Super-G	Downhill	Combined	Team combined	Parallel	Team event
2011	17	DNS1	60	—	—	—	—N/a	—N/a	—
2013	19	—	52	—	—	—	—N/a	—N/a	—
2015	21	48	59	—	—	—	—N/a	—N/a	—
2017	23	46	52	—	—	—	—N/a	—N/a	—
2019	25	DNF1	52	—	—	—	—N/a	—N/a	—
2021	27	33	33	—	—	—	—N/a	—	—
2023	29	DNS1	DNS2	—	—	—	—N/a	—	—
2025	31	28	DNF1	—	—	—N/a	—	—N/a	—

== Olympic results ==
Year
Year	Age	Slalom	Giant slalom	Super-G	Downhill	Combined	Team combined
2010	16	50	DNF1	—	—	—	—N/a
2014	20	DNF1	49	—	—	—	—N/a
2018	24	39	46	—	—	—	—N/a
2022	28	42	34	—	—	—	—N/a
2026	32	DSQ1	49	—	—	—N/a	—
