= Iason Abramashvili =

Georgian alpine skier (born 1988)

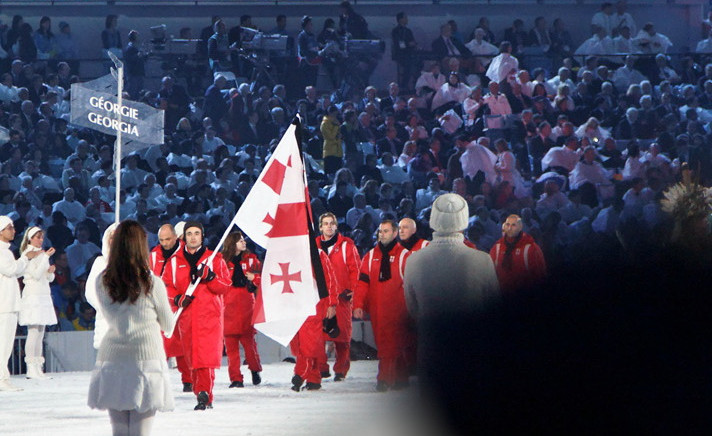
Abramashvili carrying the Georgian flag the 2010 Opening Ceremony.

Iason Abramashvili (Georgian: იასონ აბრამაშვილი, pronounced [iason abɾamaʃʷili]; born 26 April 1988) is a Georgian alpine skier from Bakuriani. He competed for Georgia at the 2010 Winter Olympics in the slalom and giant slalom. Abramashvili was Georgia's flag bearer during the 2010 Winter Olympics opening ceremony. After the death of fellow Georgian athlete Nodar Kumaritashvili, who was also from Bakuriani, he initially considered withdrawing, but decided to stay in Vancouver to compete in honor of his fallen teammate.
