= Georgian National Olympic Committee =

National Olympic Committee

- Country: Georgia
- [[|]]
- Code: GEO
- Created: 1989
- Recognized: 1993
- Continental Association: EOC
- Headquarters: Tbilisi, Georgia
- President: Leri Khabelov
- Secretary General: Emzar Zenaishvili
- Website: www.geonoc.org.ge

The Georgian National Olympic Committee (GNOC; Georgian: საქართველოს ეროვნული ოლიმპიური კომიტეტი, romanized: sakartvelos erovnuli olimp'iuri k'omit'et'i; IOC Code: GEO) is a Georgian national constituent of the worldwide Olympic movement. It is an umbrella organization for 12 regional bodies, the Georgian Olympic Academy, the Georgian Olympians’ Association, and the Olympic Museum.

== History ==
The GNOC was established on October 6, 1989, and gained a preliminary and a full recognition from the International Olympic Committee on March 9, 1992, and September 23, 1993, respectively.

== Presidents ==
№	Presidents	Portrait	Term years	
№	Presidents	Portrait	Took office	Time in office
1	Nona Gaprindashvili		6 October 1989	13 December 1996
2 (I)	Jansugh (Jano) Bagrationi		13 December 1996	13 December 2000
2 (II)	Jansugh (Jano) Bagrationi		13 December 2000	17 December 2004
3	Arkady (Badri) Patarkatsishvili		17 December 2004	9 October 2007 (Deposed)
—	Giorgi (Gogi) Topadze (acting)		24 October 2007	31 October 2008
4	Gia Natsvlishvili		31 October 2008	20 December 2012
5 (I)	Leri Khabelov		20 December 2012	23 December 2016
5 (II)	Leri Khabelov		23 December 2016	11 September 2020
5 (III)	Leri Khabelov		11 September 2020	15 November 2024
5 (IV)	Leri Khabelov		15 November 2024	Incumbent

== See also ==
- Georgia at the Olympics
