= 2017 FIL World Luge Championships – Men's singles =

Men's singles at the 2017 FIL World Luge Championships
- Venue: Olympic Sliding Centre Innsbruck
- Location: Igls, Austria
- Dates: 29 January
- Competitors: 50 from 23 nations
- Winning time: 1:39.799

Medalists
gold medal	Wolfgang Kindl	Austria
silver medal	Roman Repilov	Russia
bronze medal	Dominik Fischnaller	Italy

2017 FIL World Luge Championships
Individual	men		women
Doubles	doubles
Sprint	men	doubles	women
Relay		mixed

The Men's singles competition at the 2017 World Championships was held on 29 January 2017.

== Results ==
The first run as started at 10:29 and the second run at 12:38.

Rank	Bib	Name	Country	Run 1	Rank	Run 2	Rank	Total	Diff
1st place, gold medalist(s)	6	Wolfgang Kindl	Austria	49.823	1	49.976	1	1:39.799	
2nd place, silver medalist(s)	7	Roman Repilov	Russia	49.827	2	50.034	3	1:39.861	+0.062
3rd place, bronze medalist(s)	13	Dominik Fischnaller	Italy	49.933	6	49.986	2	1:39.919	+0.120
4	9	Johannes Ludwig	Germany	49.871	3	50.103	5	1:39.974	+0.175
5	4	Semen Pavlichenko	Russia	49.931	5	50.100	4	1:40.031	+0.232
6	3	Felix Loch	Germany	49.892	4	50.164	6	1:40.056	+0.257
7	18	Andi Langenhan	Germany	50.008	8	50.183	9	1:40.191	+0.392
8	2	Stepan Fedorov	Russia	50.035	9	50.177	8	1:40.212	+0.413
9	8	Armin Frauscher	Austria	49.986	7	50.227	11	1:40.213	+0.414
10	12	Kevin Fischnaller	Italy	50.050	11	50.175	7	1:40.225	+0.426
11	17	Theo Gruber	Italy	50.117	12	50.195	10	1:40.312	+0.513
12	1	Ralf Palik	Germany	50.044	10	50.308	18	1:40.352	+0.553
13	19	Aleksandr Gorbatcevich	Russia	50.143	13	50.247	13	1:40.390	+0.591
14	21	Emanuel Rieder	Italy	50.193	14	50.294	17	1:40.487	+0.688
15	5	Tucker West	United States	50.244	18	50.257	15	1:40.501	+0.702
16	10	Inārs Kivlenieks	Latvia	50.254	19	50.264	16	1:40.518	+0.719
17	20	Taylor Morris	United States	50.202	15	50.335	19	1:40.537	+0.738
18	29	Jonathan Gustafson	United States	50.318	21	50.244	12	1:40.562	+0.763
19	15	Chris Mazdzer	United States	50.351	23	50.249	14	1:40.600	+0.801
20	14	Arturs Dārznieks	Latvia	50.296	20	50.383	22	1:40.679	+0.880
21	22	Jonas Müller	Austria	50.202	15	50.480	23	1:40.682	+0.883
22	23	Valentin Crețu	Romania	50.343	22	50.379	21	1:40.722	+0.923
23	25	Kristaps Mauriņš	Latvia	50.393	24	50.373	20	1:40.766	+0.967
24	50	Alexander Ferlazzo	Australia	50.429	25	50.482	24	1:40.911	+1.112
25	16	Mitchel Malyk	Canada	50.233	17	51.415	25	1:41.648	+1.849
26	32	Reid Watts	Canada	50.455	DNQ				
27	11	Riks Rozītis	Latvia	50.488	DNQ				
28	26	Samuel Edney	Canada	50.541	DNQ				
29	30	Maciej Kurowski	Poland	50.553	DNQ				
30	31	Andriy Mandziy	Ukraine	50.556	DNQ				
31	27	Jozef Ninis	Slovakia	50.575	DNQ				
32	28	Ondřej Hyman	Czech Republic	50.654	DNQ				
33	35	Nicholas Klimchuk-Brown	Canada	50.721	DNQ				
34	33	Theodor Turea	Romania	50.759	DNQ				
35	37	Shiva Keshavan	India	50.890	DNQ				
36	34	Mateusz Sochowicz	Poland	50.985	DNQ				
37	44	Aleksander Melaas	Norway	51.242	DNQ				
38	38	Rupert Staudinger	Great Britain	51.264	DNQ				
39	36	Svante Kohala	Sweden	51.292	DNQ				
40	39	Jakub Šimoňák	Slovakia	51.316	DNQ				
41	51	Kim Dong-hyeon	South Korea	51.504	DNQ				
42	45	Kang Doung-kyu	South Korea	51.542	DNQ				
43	42	Leonard Cepoi	Moldova	51.698	DNQ				
44	43	Lien Te-an	Chinese Taipei	51.734	DNQ				
45	41	Tilen Sirse	Slovenia	51.834	DNQ				
46	48	William Joerding	Sweden	51.895	DNQ				
47	47	Lucas Gebauer	Great Britain	52.034	DNQ				
48	49	Tristan Jeskanen	Finland	52.785	DNQ				
49	24	David Gleirscher	Austria	52.793	DNQ				
50	46	Pavel Angelov	Bulgaria	56.113	DNQ				
—	40	Lim Nam-kyu	South Korea	DSQ					
