= 2021 FIL European Luge Championships – Men's singles =

Men's singles at the 2021 FIL European Luge Championships
- Venue: Sigulda bobsleigh, luge, and skeleton track
- Location: Sigulda, Latvia
- Dates: 9 January
- Winning time: 1:35.884

Medalists
| gold medal | Felix Loch | Germany |
| silver medal | Johannes Ludwig | Germany |
| bronze medal | Dominik Fischnaller | Italy |

The men's singles competition at the 2021 FIL European Luge Championships was held on 9 January 2021.

== Results ==
The first run was held at 11:33 and the second run at 13:05.

| Rank | Bib | Name | Country | Run 1 | Rank | Run 2 | Rank | Total | Diff |
|---|---|---|---|---|---|---|---|---|---|
| 1st place, gold medalist(s) | 30 | Felix Loch | Germany | 48.025 | 1 | 47.859 | 1 | 1:35.884 | |
| 2nd place, silver medalist(s) | 27 | Johannes Ludwig | Germany | 48.069 | 2 | 48.035 | 2 | 1:36.104 | +0.220 |
| 3rd place, bronze medalist(s) | 31 | Dominik Fischnaller | Italy | 48.114 | 4 | 48.057 | 4 | 1:36.171 | +0.287 |
| 4 | 24 | Artūrs Dārznieks | Latvia | 48.098 | 3 | 48.094 | 7 | 1:36.192 | +0.308 |
| 5 | 29 | Semen Pavlichenko | Russia | 48.208 | 7 | 48.047 | 3 | 1:36.255 | +0.371 |
| 6 | 25 | Aleksandr Gorbatcevich | Russia | 48.214 | 8 | 48.078 | 6 | 1:36.292 | +0.408 |
| 7 | 26 | Roman Repilov | Russia | 48.135 | 5 | 48.168 | 8 | 1:36.303 | +0.419 |
| 8 | 28 | Nico Gleirscher | Austria | 48.376 | 12 | 48.067 | 5 | 1:36.443 | +0.559 |
| 9 | 22 | Wolfgang Kindl | Austria | 48.141 | 6 | 48.357 | 13 | 1:36.498 | +0.614 |
| 10 | 20 | Max Langenhan | Germany | 48.305 | 10 | 48.272 | 9 | 1:36.577 | +0.693 |
| 11 | 18 | Riks Kristens Rozītis | Latvia | 48.327 | 11 | 48.291 | 10 | 1:36.618 | +0.734 |
| 12 | 16 | Gints Bērziņš | Latvia | 48.473 | 15 | 48.295 | 11 | 1:36.768 | +0.884 |
| 13 | 19 | Kevin Fischnaller | Italy | 48.485 | 16 | 48.340 | 12 | 1:36.825 | +0.941 |
| 14 | 10 | Andriy Mandziy | Ukraine | 48.380 | 13 | 48.714 | 17 | 1:37.094 | +1.210 |
| 15 | 15 | Jozef Ninis | Slovakia | 48.548 | 17 | 48.627 | 15 | 1:37.175 | +1.291 |
| 16 | 21 | Moritz Bollmann | Germany | 48.675 | 18 | 48.516 | 14 | 1:37.191 | +1.307 |
| 17 | 5 | Mateusz Sochowicz | Poland | 48.675 | 18 | 48.639 | 16 | 1:37.314 | +1.430 |
| 18 | 7 | Valentin Creţu | Romania | 48.940 | 21 | 48.946 | 18 | 1:37.886 | +2.002 |
| 19 | 12 | Anton Dukach | Ukraine | 48.465 | 14 | 49.812 | 23 | 1:38.277 | +2.393 |
| 20 | 6 | Svante Kohala | Sweden | 49.116 | 22 | 49.170 | 20 | 1:38.286 | +2.402 |
| 21 | 1 | Lukas Gufler | Italy | 49.296 | 23 | 49.081 | 19 | 1:38.377 | +2.493 |
| 22 | 4 | Giorgi Sogoiani | Georgia | 49.447 | 24 | 49.609 | 21 | 1:39.056 | +3.172 |
| 23 | 2 | Marián Skupek | Slovakia | 50.050 | 25 | 50.867 | 24 | 1:40.917 | +5.033 |
| 24 | 3 | Theodor Turea | Romania | 1:00.325 | 26 | 49.619 | 22 | 1:49.944 | +14.060 |
| 25 | | Kacper Tarnawski | Poland | Did not qualify via Nationscup | | | | | |
| 26 | | Pavel Angelov | Bulgaria | Did not qualify via Nationscup | | | | | |
| 27 | | Saba Kumaritashvili | Georgia | Did not qualify via Nationscup | | | | | |
| 28 | | Jozef Hušla | Slovakia | Did not qualify via Nationscup | | | | | |
| 29 | | Mirza Nikolajev | Bosnia and Herzegovina | Did not qualify via Nationscup | | | | | |
| 30 | | Ionuț Șișcanu | Moldova | Did not qualify via Nationscup | | | | | |
| 31 | | Michael Lejsek | Czech Republic | Did not qualify via Nationscup | | | | | |
| 32 | | Iulian Oprea | Moldova | Did not qualify via Nationscup | | | | | |
| 33 | | Oleh-Roman Pylypiv | Ukraine | Did not qualify via Nationscup | | | | | |
| | 17 | Pavel Repilov | Russia | 48.833 | 20 | Did not finish | | | |
| | 32 | Jonas Müller | Austria | 48.233 | 9 | Did not finish | | | |
| | 23 | David Gleirscher | Austria | Disqualified | | | | | |
