= 2017 FIL European Luge Championships – Men's singles =

Men's singles at the 2017 FIL European Luge Championships
- Venue: Königssee bobsleigh, luge, and skeleton track
- Location: Königssee, Germany
- Dates: 6 January
- Winning time: 1:38.363

Medalists
gold medal	Semen Pavlichenko	Russia
silver medal	Ralf Palik	Germany
bronze medal	Wolfgang Kindl	Austria

The women's singles competition at the 2017 FIL European Luge Championships was held on 6 January 2017.

== Competition schedule ==
All times are local (UTC+1).

Date	Time	Event
6 January	11:35	Run 1
6 January	13:05	Run 2

== Results ==
Two runs in one day, were used to determine the winner.

Rank	Bib	Name	Country	Run 1	Rank	Run 2	Rank	Total	Diff
1st place, gold medalist(s)	32	Semen Pavlichenko	Russia	49.245	1	49.118	1	1:38.363	—
2nd place, silver medalist(s)	24	Ralf Palik	Germany	49.301	2	49.310	2	1:38.611	+0.248
3rd place, bronze medalist(s)	26	Wolfgang Kindl	Austria	49.429	3	49.394	4	1:38.823	+0.460
4	29	Felix Loch	Germany	49.572	5	49.316	3	1:38.888	+0.525
5	28	Roman Repilov	Russia	49.508	4	49.397	5	1:38.905	+0.542
6	27	Dominik Fischnaller	Italy	49.576	6	49.593	7	1:39.169	+0.806
7	30	Stepan Fedorov	Russia	49.695	9	49.489	6	1:39.184	+0.821
8	20	Armin Frauscher	Austria	49.616	7	49.594	8	1:39.210	+0.847
9	21	Julian von Schleinitz	Germany	49.622	8	49.757	12	1:39.379	+1.016
10	5	Arturs Darznieks	Latvia	49.720	11	49.671	9	1:39.391	+1.028
11	4	Riks Rozitis	Latvia	49.707	10	49.716	11	1:39.423	+1.060
12	14	Kevin Fischnaller	Italy	49.903	15	49.823	13	1:39.726	+1.363
13	9	Emanuel Rieder	Italy	49.850	13	49.890	15	1:39.740	+1.377
14	23	Reinhard Egger	Austria	49.866	14	49.912	16	1:39.778	+1.415
15	11	Aleksandr Gorbatcevich	Russia	49.933	16	49.869	14	1:39.802	+1.439
16	19	Johannes Ludwig	Germany	50.104	20	49.711	10	1:39.815	+1.452
17	15	Jozef Ninis	Slovakia	50.004	17	49.964	18	1:39.968	+1.605
18	6	Maciej Kurowski	Poland	50.009	18	50.002	19	1:40.011	+1.648
19	3	Theo Gruber	Italy	50.032	19	50.079	20	1:40.111	+1.748
20	8	Inars Kivlenieks	Latvia	49.788	12	50.334	22	1:40.122	+1.759
21	13	Ondrej Hyman	Czech Republic	50.333	22	50.163	21	1:40.496	+2.133
22	16	Valentin Crețu	Romania	51.400	23	49.961	17	1:41.361	+2.998
23		Nico Gleirscher	Austria	Did not qualify via Nationscup					
24		Mateusz Sochowicz	Poland	Did not qualify via Nationscup					
25		Jakub Šimoňák	Slovakia	Did not qualify via Nationscup					
26		Rupert Staudinger	Great Britain	Did not qualify via Nationscup					
27		Svante Kohala	Sweden	Did not qualify via Nationscup					
28		Pavel Angelov	Bulgaria	Did not qualify via Nationscup					
29		Rufus Persson	Sweden	Did not qualify via Nationscup					
30		Adrien Maitre	France	Did not qualify via Nationscup					
		Andriy Mandziy	Ukraine	Did not qualify via Nationscup					
	18	David Gleirscher	Austria	50.246	21	Did not finish			
