= 2022 FIL European Luge Championships – Men's singles =

Men's singles at the 2022 FIL European Luge Championships
- Venue: St. Moritz-Celerina Olympic Bobrun
- Location: St. Moritz, Switzerland
- Dates: 22 January
- Competitors: 31 from 13 nations
- Winning time: 2:10.246

Medalists
gold medal	Wolfgang Kindl	Austria
silver medal	Kristers Aparjods	Latvia
bronze medal	Nico Gleirscher	Austria

The men's singles competition at the 2022 FIL European Luge Championships was held on 22 January 2022.

== Results ==
The first run was held at 11:48 and the second run at 13:30.

Rank	Bib	Name	Country	Run 1	Rank	Run 2	Rank	Total	Diff
1st place, gold medalist(s)	26	Wolfgang Kindl	Austria	1:05.162	3	1:05.084	1	2:10.246	
2nd place, silver medalist(s)	27	Kristers Aparjods	Latvia	1:05.182	4	1:05.085	2	2:10.267	+0.031
3rd place, bronze medalist(s)	28	Nico Gleirscher	Austria	1:05.365	7	1:05.181	3	2:10.546	+0.300
4	31	Felix Loch	Germany	1:05.417	9	1:05.194	4	2:10.611	+0.365
5	21	Jonas Müller	Austria	1:05.337	6	1:05.319	5	2:10.656	+0.410
6	16	Leon Felderer	Italy	1:05.366	8	1:05.360	6	2:10.726	+0.480
7	29	Max Langenhan	Germany	1:05.459	10	1:05.497	9	2:10.956	+0.710
8	20	Dominik Fischnaller	Italy	1:05.052	1	1:05.919	16	2:10.971	+0.725
9	32	Roman Repilov	Russia	1:05.637	12	1:05.387	7	2:11.024	+0.778
10	25	Kevin Fischnaller	Italy	1:05.563	11	1:05.489	8	2:11.052	+0.806
11	30	Johannes Ludwig	Germany	1:05.070	2	1:06.010	19	2:11.080	+0.834
12	23	Gints Bērziņš	Latvia	1:05.292	5	1:05.985	17	2:11.277	+1.031
13	24	Chris Eißler	Germany	1:05.685	13	1:05.719	12	2:11.404	+1.158
14	17	Artūrs Dārznieks	Latvia	1:05.744	14	1:05.714	11	2:11.458	+1.212
15	18	Semen Pavlichenko	Russia	1:05.794	15	1:05.783	14	2:11.577	+1.331
16	19	David Gleirscher	Austria	1:06.026	18	1:05.690	10	2:11.716	+1.470
17	12	Anton Dukach	Ukraine	1:05.909	17	1:05.900	15	2:11.809	+1.563
18	7	Jozef Ninis	Slovakia	1:05.880	16	1:06.003	18	2:11.883	+1.637
19	22	Aleksandr Gorbatcevich	Russia	1:06.263	23	1:05.744	13	2:12.007	+1.761
20	5	Andriy Mandziy	Ukraine	1:06.219	22	1:06.020	20	2:12.239	+1.993
21	3	Lukas Gufler	Italy	1:06.029	19	1:06.272	21	2:12.291	+2.045
22	8	Mateusz Sochowicz	Poland	1:06.082	20	1:06.318	23	2:12.400	+2.154
23	2	Theodor Turea	Romania	1:06.276	24	1:06.296	22	2:12.572	+2.326
24	4	Eduard Crăciun	Romania	1:06.325	25	1:06.353	24	2:12.678	+2.432
25	1	Jozef Hušla	Slovakia	1:06.465	26	1:07.236	25	2:13.701	+3.455
26	6	Marián Skupek	Slovakia	1:06.189	21	1:07.659	26	2:13.848	+3.602
		Kacper Tarnawski	Poland	Did not qualify via Nationscup					
		Mirza Nikolajev	Bosnia and Herzegovina	Did not qualify via Nationscup					
		Michael Lejsek	Czech Republic	Did not qualify via Nationscup					
		Ionuț Șișcanu	Moldova	Did not qualify via Nationscup					
		Saba Kumaritashvili	Georgia	Did not qualify via Nationscup					
