= 2020 FIL European Luge Championships – Men's singles =

Men's singles at the 2020 FIL European Luge Championships
- Venue: Lillehammer Olympic Bobsleigh and Luge Track
- Location: Lillehammer, Norway
- Dates: 19 January
- Competitors: 26 from 10 nations
- Winning time: 1:37.737

Medalists
gold medal	Dominik Fischnaller	Italy
silver medal	Semen Pavlichenko	Russia
bronze medal	Roman Repilov	Russia

The Men's singles competition at the 2020 FIL European Luge Championships was held on 19 January 2020.

== Competition schedule ==
All times are (UTC+1).

Date	Time	Event
19 January	09:20	Run 1
19 January	10:55	Run 2

== Results ==
Two runs in one day, were used to determine the winner.

Rank	Bib	Name	Country	Run 1	Rank	Run 2	Rank	Total	Diff
1st place, gold medalist(s)	30	Dominik Fischnaller	Italy	48.763	2	48.974	1	1:37.737	
2nd place, silver medalist(s)	25	Semen Pavlichenko	Russia	48.761 TR	1	49.150	4	1:37.911	+0.174
3rd place, bronze medalist(s)	32	Roman Repilov	Russia	48.889	3	49.076	2	1:37.965	+0.228
4	28	David Gleirscher	Austria	48.944	4	49.260	6	1:38.204	+0.467
5	23	Kevin Fischnaller	Italy	49.003	5	49.407	9	1:38.410	+0.673
6	15	Stepan Fedorov	Russia	49.015	6	49.425	12	1:38.440	+0.703
7	20	Johannes Ludwig	Germany	49.032	7	49.438	13	1:38.470	+0.733
8	24	Wolfgang Kindl	Austria	49.305	9	49.262	7	1:38.567	+0.830
9	29	Kristers Aparjods	Latvia	49.206	8	49.418	11	1:38.624	+0.887
10	27	Jonas Müller	Austria	49.386	11	49.320	8	1:38.706	+0.969
11	21	Max Langenhan	Germany	49.341	10	49.412	10	1:38.753	+1.016
12	22	Maksim Aravin	Russia	49.558	15	49.258	5	1:38.816	+1.079
13	26	Felix Loch	Germany	49.668	18	49.149	3	1:38.817	+1.080
14	10	Nico Gleirscher	Austria	49.541	14	49.486	15	1:39.027	+1.290
15	13	Riks Kristens Rozītis	Latvia	49.441	13	49.564	16	1:39.095	+1.358
16	16	Jozef Ninis	Slovakia	49.656	17	49.484	14	1:39.140	+1.403
17	19	Inārs Kivlenieks	Latvia	49.436	12	49.795	19	1:39.231	+1.494
18	6	Arturs Dārznieks	Latvia	49.600	16	49.883	20	1:39.483	+1.746
19	5	Valentin Crețu	Romania	49.742	20	49.765	18	1:39.507	+1.770
20	17	Sebastian Bley	Germany	49.675	19	50.067	22	1:39.742	+2.005
21	4	Svante Kohala	Sweden	49.853	22	50.193	23	1:40.046	+2.309
22	3	Mateusz Sochowicz	Poland	49.800	21	50.435	24	1:40.235	+2.498
23	9	Jakub Simonak	Slovakia	50.511	24	49.757	17	1:40.268	+2.531
24	1	Leon Felderer	Italy	50.606	25	50.546	25	1:41.152	+3.415
25	7	Andriy Mandziy	Ukraine	50.040	23	1:13.166	26	2:03.206	+25.469
26	12	Anton Dukach	Ukraine	1:16.012	26	49.977	21	2:05.989	+28.252
27		Aleksander Melaas	Norway	Did not qualify via Nationscup					
28		Jan Čežík	Czech Republic	Did not qualify via Nationscup					
29		Lukas Gufler	Italy	Did not qualify via Nationscup					
30		Kacper Tarnawski	Poland	Did not qualify via Nationscup					
31		Andrei Turea	Romania	Did not qualify via Nationscup					
32		Michael Lejsek	Czech Republic	Did not qualify via Nationscup					
33		Mirza Nikolajev	Bosnia and Herzegovina	Did not qualify via Nationscup					
34		Tsvetelin Ivanov	Bulgaria	Did not qualify via Nationscup					
35		Anel Čirkinagić	Bosnia and Herzegovina	Did not qualify via Nationscup					
36		Zlatan Jakić	Bosnia and Herzegovina	Did not qualify via Nationscup					
