= 2019 FIL European Luge Championships – Men's singles =

Men's singles at the 2019 FIL European Luge Championships
- Venue: Oberhof bobsleigh, luge, and skeleton track
- Location: Oberhof, Germany
- Dates: 9 February
- Competitors: 26 from 11 nations
- Winning time: 1:26.203

Medalists
gold medal	Semen Pavlichenko	Russia
silver medal	Roman Repilov	Russia
bronze medal	Kristers Aparjods	Latvia

The Men's singles competition at the 2019 FIL European Luge Championships was held on 9 February 2019.

== Results ==
The first run was held at 12:35 and the second run at 14:15.

Rank	Bib	Name	Country	Run 1	Rank	Run 2	Rank	Total	Diff
1st place, gold medalist(s)	32	Semen Pavlichenko	Russia	43.231	2	42.972	1	1:26.203	
2nd place, silver medalist(s)	20	Roman Repilov	Russia	43.188	1	43.059	2	1:26.247	+0.044
3rd place, bronze medalist(s)	26	Kristers Aparjods	Latvia	43.290	4	43.094	4	1:26.384	+0.181
4	29	Reinhard Egger	Austria	43.259	3	43.140	5	1:26.399	+0.196
5	27	Johannes Ludwig	Germany	43.302	6	43.143	6	1:26.445	+0.242
6	30	David Gleirscher	Austria	43.398	11	43.078	3	1:26.476	+0.273
7	28	Felix Loch	Germany	43.290	4	43.191	8	1:26.481	+0.278
8	31	Dominik Fischnaller	Italy	43.362	7	43.214	9	1:26.576	+0.373
9	19	Chris Eißler	Germany	43.386	9	43.269	11	1:26.655	+0.452
10	18	Inārs Kivlenieks	Latvia	43.605	18	43.170	7	1:26.775	+0.572
11	23	Sebastian Bley	Germany	43.412	12	43.375	12	1:26.787	+0.584
12	9	Arturs Dārznieks	Latvia	43.396	10	43.510	14	1:26.906	+0.703
13	24	Jonas Müller	Austria	43.447	13	43.514	15	1:26.961	+0.758
14	12	Riks Rozītis	Latvia	43.383	8	43.598	18	1:26.981	+0.778
15	10	Stepan Fedorov	Russia	43.491	15	43.577	17	1:27.068	+0.865
16	17	Kevin Fischnaller	Italy	43.447	13	43.625	19	1:27.072	+0.869
17	7	Mateusz Sochowicz	Poland	43.565	17	43.508	13	1:27.073	+0.870
18	22	Jozef Ninis	Slovakia	43.519	16	43.560	16	1:27.079	+0.876
19	25	Aleksandr Gorbatcevich	Russia	44.140	22	43.240	10	1:27.380	+1.177
20	8	Maciej Kurowski	Poland	43.682	19	43.699	20	1:27.381	+1.178
21	5	Valentin Creţu	Romania	43.915	20	43.726	21	1:27.641	+1.438
22	3	Svante Kohala	Sweden	43.991	21	43.863	22	1:27.854	+1.651
23	2	Andriy Mandziy	Ukraine	44.227	23	44.010	23	1:28.237	+2.034
24	1	Michael Lejsek	Czech Republic	44.395	24	44.463	24	1:28.858	+2.655
—	4	Anton Dukach	Ukraine	Did not finish					
—	21	Wolfgang Kindl	Austria	Did not finish					
