= Luge at the 2018 Winter Olympics – Men's singles =

Men's singles at the XXIII Olympic Winter Games
- Venue: Alpensia Sliding Centre near Pyeongchang, South Korea
- Dates: 10–11 February 2018
- Competitors: 40 from 21 nations
- Winning time: 3:10.702

Medalists
1st place, gold medalist(s)		David Gleirscher	Austria
2nd place, silver medalist(s)		Chris Mazdzer	United States
3rd place, bronze medalist(s)		Johannes Ludwig	Germany

The men's luge at the 2018 Winter Olympics was held between 10 and 11 February 2018 at the Alpensia Sliding Centre near Pyeongchang, South Korea.

The event was won by David Gleirscher, who became the first Austrian to win men's luge since 1968. Chris Mazdzer won the silver medal, whereas Johannes Ludwig won the bronze. For all of them, this was the first Olympic medal, and the Mazdzer's medal is the first ever medal for the United States in men's singles luge. This is the first time since 1988 than none of the medalists in men's luge had a medal of previous Olympics. The favorite and the defending Olympic champion, Felix Loch, was leading the field after three runs, but in the last run made a mistake which cost him a medal.

== Qualifying athletes ==
The field included the 2010 and the 2014 Olympic champion Felix Loch, who is also the 2017–18 Luge World Cup winner, the 2016–17 Luge World Cup winner Roman Repilov, and Wolfgang Kindl who finished second in the 2017–18 Luge World Cup. None of them won a medal.

- Alexander Ferlazzo (AUS)
- David Gleirscher (AUT)
- Reinhard Egger (AUT)
- Wolfgang Kindl (AUT)
- Pavel Angelov (BUL)
- Mitchel Malyk (CAN)
- Reid Watts (CAN)
- Samuel Edney (CAN)
- Ondřej Hyman (CZE)
- Adam Rosen (GBR)
- Rupert Staudinger (GBR)
- Giorgi Sogoiani (GEO)
- Andi Langenhan (GER)
- Felix Loch (GER)
- Johannes Ludwig (GER)
- Shiva Keshavan (IND)
- Dominik Fischnaller (ITA)
- Emanuel Rieder (ITA)
- Kevin Fischnaller (ITA)
- Nikita Kopyrenko (KAZ)
- Lim Nam-kyu (KOR)
- Arturs Dārznieks (LAT)
- Inārs Kivlenieks (LAT)
- Kristers Aparjods (LAT)
- Roman Repilov (OAR)
- Semen Pavlichenko (OAR)
- Stepan Fedorov (OAR)
- Maciej Kurowski (POL)
- Mateusz Sochowicz (POL)
- Andrei Turea (ROU)
- Valentin Crețu (ROU)
- Tilen Sirše (SLO)
- Jakub Šimoňák (SVK)
- Jozef Ninis (SVK)
- Lien Te-an (TPE)
- Andriy Mandziy (UKR)
- Anton Dukach (UKR)
- Chris Mazdzer (USA)
- Taylor Morris (USA)
- Tucker West (USA)

== Competition schedule ==
All times are (UTC+9).

Date	Time	Event
10 February	19:10	Run 1
10 February		Run 2
11 February	18:50	Run 3
11 February		Run 4

== Results ==
Four runs, split over two days, were used to determine the winner.

Rank	Bib	Athlete	Country	Run 1	Rank	Run 2	Rank	Run 3	Rank	Run 4	Rank	Total	Behind
1st place, gold medalist(s)	11	David Gleirscher	Austria	47.652	1	47.835	7	47.584	4	47.631	4	3:10.702	—
2nd place, silver medalist(s)	13	Chris Mazdzer	United States	47.800	5	47.717	2	47.534	1	47.677	7	3:10.728	+0.026
3rd place, bronze medalist(s)	3	Johannes Ludwig	Germany	47.764	3	47.940	14	47.625	6	47.603	3	3:10.932	+0.230
4	4	Dominik Fischnaller	Italy	47.930	10	47.967	16	47.562	3	47.475	1	3:10.934	+0.232
5	5	Felix Loch	Germany	47.674	2	47.625	1	47.560	2	48.109	19	3:10.968	+0.266
6	19	Samuel Edney	Canada	47.862	9	47.755	4	47.759	10	47.645	6	3:11.021	+0.319
7	14	Kevin Fischnaller	Italy	47.853	8	47.793	5	47.596	5	47.812	8	3:11.054	+0.352
8	6	Roman Repilov	Olympic Athletes from Russia	47.776	4	47.740	3	47.948	15	47.644	5	3:11.108	+0.406
9	2	Wolfgang Kindl	Austria	47.955	11	47.858	9	47.799	12	47.521	2	3:11.133	+0.431
10	10	Andi Langenhan	Germany	48.083	18	47.850	8	47.630	7	47.870	13	3:11.433	+0.731
11	8	Kristers Aparjods	Latvia	47.822	6	47.834	6	47.858	13	47.942	17	3:11.456	+0.754
12	24	Reid Watts	Canada	47.960	12	47.895	10	47.787	11	47.848	11	3:11.490	+0.788
13	22	Stepan Fedorov	Olympic Athletes from Russia	48.035	13	47.936	13	47.755	9	47.882	14	3:11.608	+0.906
14	1	Semen Pavlichenko	Olympic Athletes from Russia	48.337	24	47.923	12	47.716	8	47.883	15	3:11.859	+1.157
15	7	Reinhard Egger	Austria	48.221	20	47.903	11	47.963	17	47.840	10	3:11.927	+1.225
16	25	Mitchel Malyk	Canada	48.075	17	48.050	18	47.952	16	47.869	12	3:11.946	+1.244
17	20	Emanuel Rieder	Italy	48.040	14	48.047	17	47.972	18	48.082	18	3:12.141	+1.439
18	23	Taylor Morris	United States	48.072	15	48.793	32	47.858	13	47.824	9	3:12.547	+1.845
19	26	Maciej Kurowski	Poland	48.103	19	48.467	24	48.158	22	47.885	16	3:12.613	+1.911
20	17	Inārs Kivlenieks	Latvia	48.274	21	48.370	22	48.066	20	48.112	20	3:12.822	+2.120
21	16	Ondřej Hyman	Czech Republic	48.324	23	48.276	20	48.313	25	did not advance		2:24.913	N/A
22	31	Adam Rosen	Great Britain	48.477	25	48.410	23	48.280	23	did not advance		2:25.167	N/A
23	35	Anton Dukach	Ukraine	48.888	27	48.307	21	48.303	24	did not advance		2:25.498	N/A
24	21	Arturs Dārznieks	Latvia	48.305	22	48.671	29	48.602	28	did not advance		2:25.578	N/A
25	12	Jozef Ninis	Slovakia	47.833	7	50.014	37	48.095	21	did not advance		2:25.942	N/A
26	9	Tucker West	United States	48.484	26	47.942	15	49.593	37	did not advance		2:26.019	N/A
27	15	Mateusz Sochowicz	Poland	49.047	29	48.203	19	48.930	31	did not advance		2:26.180	N/A
28	27	Alexander Ferlazzo	Australia	48.073	16	48.587	27	49.351	36	did not advance		2:26.191	N/A
29	18	Valentin Crețu	Romania	49.030	28	49.085	33	48.424	26	did not advance		2:26.539	N/A
30	29	Lim Nam-kyu	South Korea	49.461	31	48.591	28	48.620	29	did not advance		2:26.672	N/A
31	39	Andrei Turea	Romania	49.482	32	48.489	26	49.314	35	did not advance		2:27.285	N/A
32	36	Giorgi Sogoiani	Georgia	49.300	30	49.151	34	49.008	33	did not advance		2:27.459	N/A
33	34	Rupert Staudinger	Great Britain	49.626	33	49.259	35	48.957	32	did not advance		2:27.842	N/A
34	37	Shiva Keshavan	India	50.578	36	48.710	31	48.900	30	did not advance		2:28.188	N/A
35	33	Jakub Šimoňák	Slovakia	51.724	38	48.690	30	48.522	27	did not advance		2:28.936	N/A
36	40	Nikita Kopyrenko	Kazakhstan	50.147	35	50.327	38	49.244	34	did not advance		2:29.718	N/A
37	28	Pavel Angelov	Bulgaria	51.569	37	49.449	36	50.094	39	did not advance		2:31.112	N/A
38	38	Lien Te-an	Chinese Taipei	52.121	39	51.472	39	50.545	40	did not advance		2:34.138	N/A
39	30	Tilen Sirše	Slovenia	49.887	34	58.776	40	49.646	38	did not advance		2:38.309	N/A
40	32	Andriy Mandziy	Ukraine	1:02.935	40	48.473	25	47.981	19	did not advance		2:39.389	N/A
