= Fischnaller =

Fischnaller (pronounced [ˈfɪʃnalɐ]) is a German-language surname typical of the Alpine region of Tyrol. Notable people with the surname include:

- Dominik Fischnaller (born 1993), Italian luger
- Emily Fischnaller (née Sweeney; born 1993), American luger
- Franz Fischnaller (born 1954), Italian digital artist
- Hans Peter Fischnaller (born 1985), Italian luger
- Kevin Fischnaller (born 1993), Italian luger
- Manuel Fischnaller (born 1991), Italian footballer
- Roland Fischnaller (snowboarder) (born 1980), Italian snowboarder
- Roland Fischnaller (alpine skier) (born 1975), Italian alpine skier
