= Andriy Mandziy =

Ukrainian luger (born 1988)

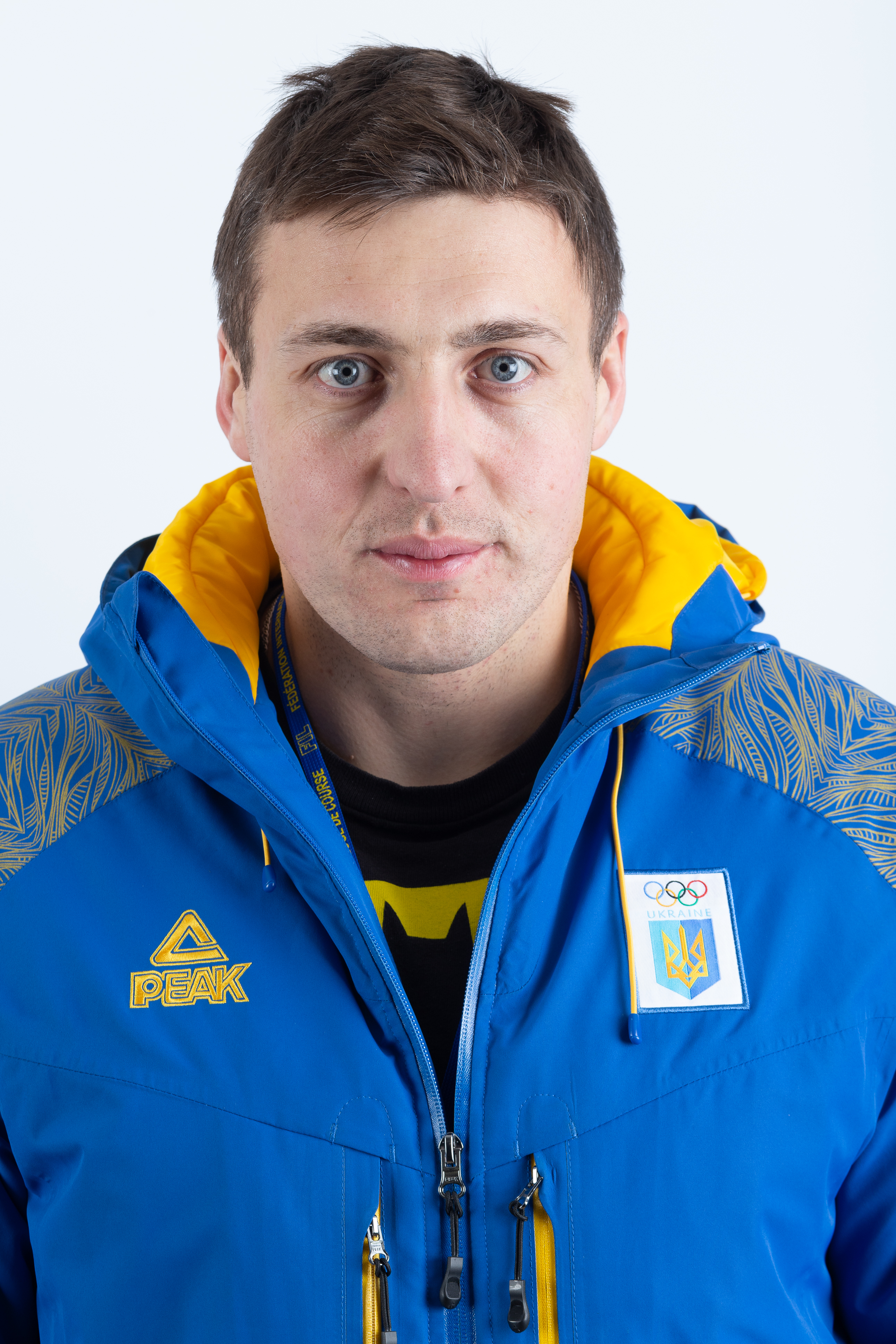
- Mandziy in 2018

Personal information
- Nationality: Ukrainian
- Born: 19 February 1988 (age 38) Kremenets, Ukraine
- Height: 1.86 m (6 ft 1 in)
- Weight: 96 kg (212 lb)

Sport
- Country: Ukraine
- Sport: Luge
- Event: Men's singles

Andriy Vasylyovych Mandziy (Ukrainian: Андрій Васильович Мандзій; born 19 February 1988) is a Ukrainian luger. He competed at the 2014, 2018, 2022, and 2026 Winter Olympics.

== Career ==
Mandziy's first World Cup season was the 2008–09 season. He finished in his first World Cup race 46th in Igls, Austria. As of December 2025, Madziy's best personal World Cup finishes were 9th during the 2022–23 season on 7 January 2023 and during the 2023–24 season on 25 February 2024 in the men's singles events both held in Sigulda, Latvia.

On January 5, 2025, Mandziy finished third in the mixed relay event in Sigulda. The team also included Tunytska, Hoy, Kachmar, Stetskiv, and Mokh. This marked the first ever medal for Ukraine in the relay event.

At the 2014 Winter Olympics, he was 31st in the men's singles event. On December 27, 2017, Mandziy qualified for the 2018 Winter Olympics. At the Olympics, he was 40th in the singles' race due to losing control over his luge during the first race. In 2022, Andriy Mandziy was nominated for his third Winter Games in Beijing. In the singles event, he finished 27th and didn't qualify for the fourth run due to a disastrous first run after falling off his sledge.

== Personal life ==
Andriy Mandziy graduated from Lviv State University of Physical Culture. He works as a sports instructor. His hobbies are music and sports.

== Career results ==
=== Winter Olympics ===
Year	Event	Singles	Relay
2014	Sochi, Russia	31	—
2018	Pyeongchang, South Korea	40	—
2022	Beijing, China	27	—
2026	(Italy) Milano Cortina	12	6

=== World Championships ===
Year	Event	Singles	Relay	Singles Sprint	Mixed Singles
2011	Cesana, Italy	27	—	—N/a	—N/a
2012	Altenberg, Germany	31	12	—N/a	—N/a
2013	Whistler, Canada	29	—	—N/a	—N/a
2015	Sigulda, Latvia	28	10	—N/a	—N/a
2016	Königssee, Germany	27	—	33	—N/a
2017	Innsbruck, Austria	30	13	27	—N/a
2019	Winterberg, Germany	23	—	27	—N/a
2021	Königssee, Germany	22	—	13	—N/a
2023	Oberhof, Germany	14	8	20	—N/a
2024	Altenberg, Germany	15	—	12	—N/a
2025	Whistler, Canada	14	6	—N/a	16

=== European Championships ===
Year	Event	Singles	Relay	Mixed Singles
2010	Sigulda, Latvia	28	5	—N/a
2013	Oberhof, Germany	27	—	—N/a
2015	Sochi, Russia	21	5	—N/a
2016	Altenberg, Germany	23	—	—N/a
2017	Königssee, Germany	DNF	8	—N/a
2018	Sigulda, Latvia	19	7	—N/a
2019	Oberhof, Germany	23	—	—N/a
2020	Lillehammer, Norway	25	—	—N/a
2021	Sigulda, Latvia	14	6	—N/a
2022	St. Moritz, Switzerland	20	—	—N/a
2023	Sigulda, Latvia	11	4	—N/a
2024	Igls, Austria	11	5	—N/a
2025	Winterberg, Germany	14	—	—N/a
2026	Oberhof, Germany	14	5	9

=== Luge World Cup ===
==== Relay podiums ====
Season	Track	Competition	Placement
2024–25	Sigulda, Latvia	Mixed relay	3

==== Rankings ====
Season	Singles	Singles Sprint	Overall
2009–10	48	—N/a	
2010–11	41	—N/a	
2011–12	41	—N/a	
2012–13	41	—N/a	
2013–14	50	—N/a	
2014–15	41	—N/a	
2015–16	40		—N/a
2016–17	36		—N/a
2017–18	36		—N/a
2018–19	32		—N/a
2019–20	31		—N/a
2020–21	20	20	18
2021–22	28		28
2022–23	24	18	24
2023–24	15	18	15
2024–25	19	—N/a	
2025–26	16	—N/a	
