= Adam Rosen =

British-American luger (1984–2021)

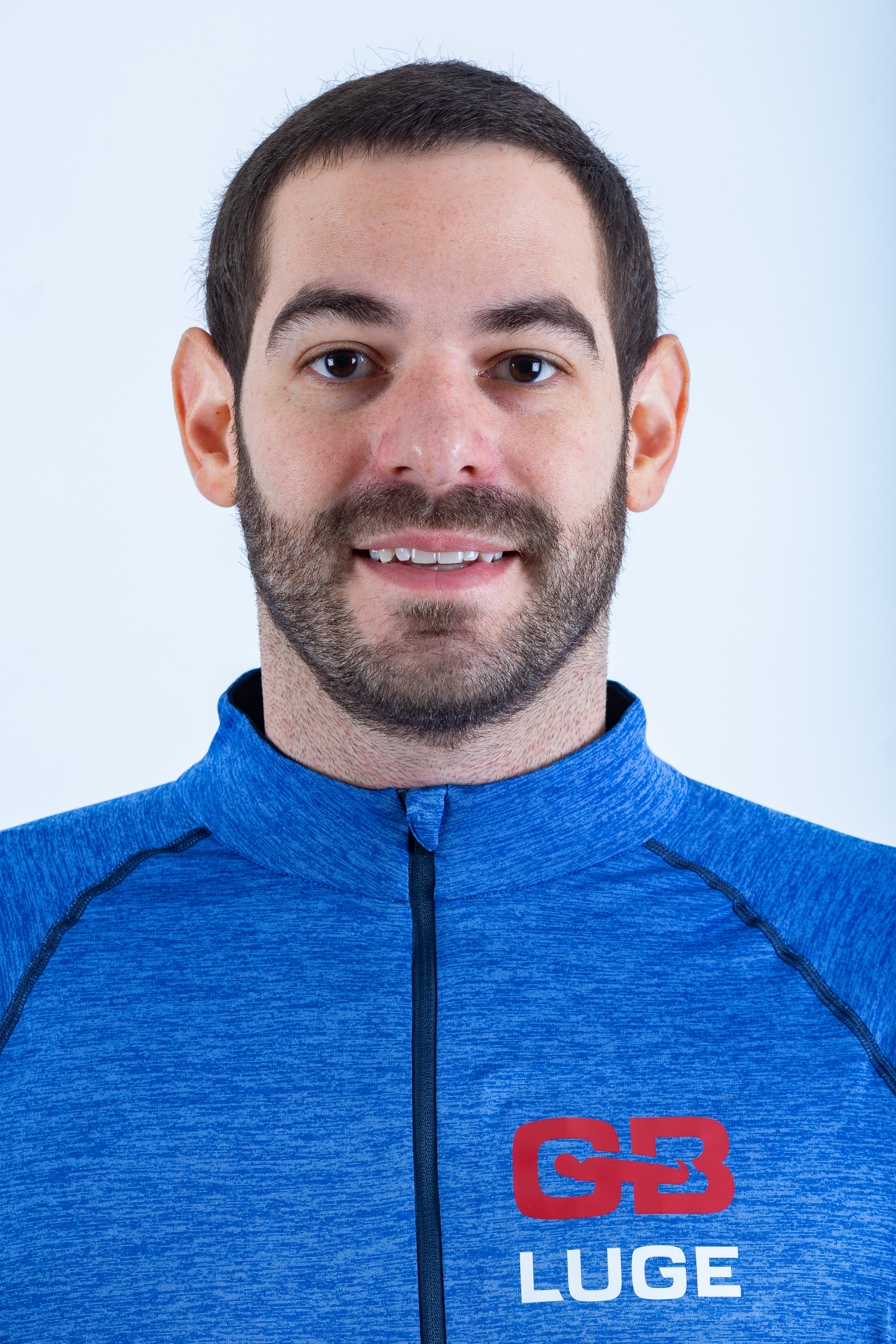
- Rosen in 2018

Personal information
- Full name: Adam Joseph Rosen
- Nickname: AJ
- National team: Great Britain
- Citizenship: American and British
- Born: April 12, 1984 New Rochelle, New York, U.S.
- Died: December 19, 2021 (aged 37)
- Height: 6 ft 2 in (188 cm)
- Weight: 176 lb (80 kg)

Sport
- Country: Great Britain
- Sport: Luge

Adam Joseph Rosen (April 12, 1984 – December 19, 2021), often known as AJ Rosen, was an American-British Olympic luger who debuted in 2003.

== Personal life ==
A native and resident of New Rochelle, New York, Rosen was Jewish. His mother, Gay, is from the United Kingdom. He was named after his grandfather, who served aboard HMS Sussex for the Royal Navy during World War II. He graduated from New Rochelle High School in 2002, after playing football for the school team for one season.

Rosen was involved with the New York State Civil Air Patrol, having earned a Cadet Senior Master Sergeant rank in 2001. He was also a part-time music entrepreneur. He was a dual U.S.-British citizen. His younger brother Brett plays baseball for the Great Britain national baseball team.

He died from cancer on December 19, 2021, at the age of 37.

== Career ==
Rosen became attracted to luge while watching the 1994 Winter Olympics on television in his New Rochelle home when he was nine years old. He trained with the Canadian luge team.

He finished 16th in the men's singles event at both the 2006 Winter Olympics in Turin, out of 36 competitors, and the 2010 Winter Olympics in Vancouver, out of 38 competitors.

Rosen did not qualify for the 2014 Winter Olympics, so luge did not receive UK Sport funding for the 2018 Olympic cycle. He qualified for the 2018 Winter Olympics, along with Rupert Staudinger, where with inferior equipment he finished 22nd.

His best finish at the FIL World Luge Championships was 24th in the men's singles event at Igls in 2007. He had the best-ever result for a British luger when he finished in sixth place at the Viessman Luge World Cup in Calgary, Alberta, Canada, during the 2008–09 World Cup season. He returned to competing after a 2009 accident in which he dislocated his hip and damaged his nerves.
