= Nikita Kopyrenko =

Kazakhstani luger (born 1998)

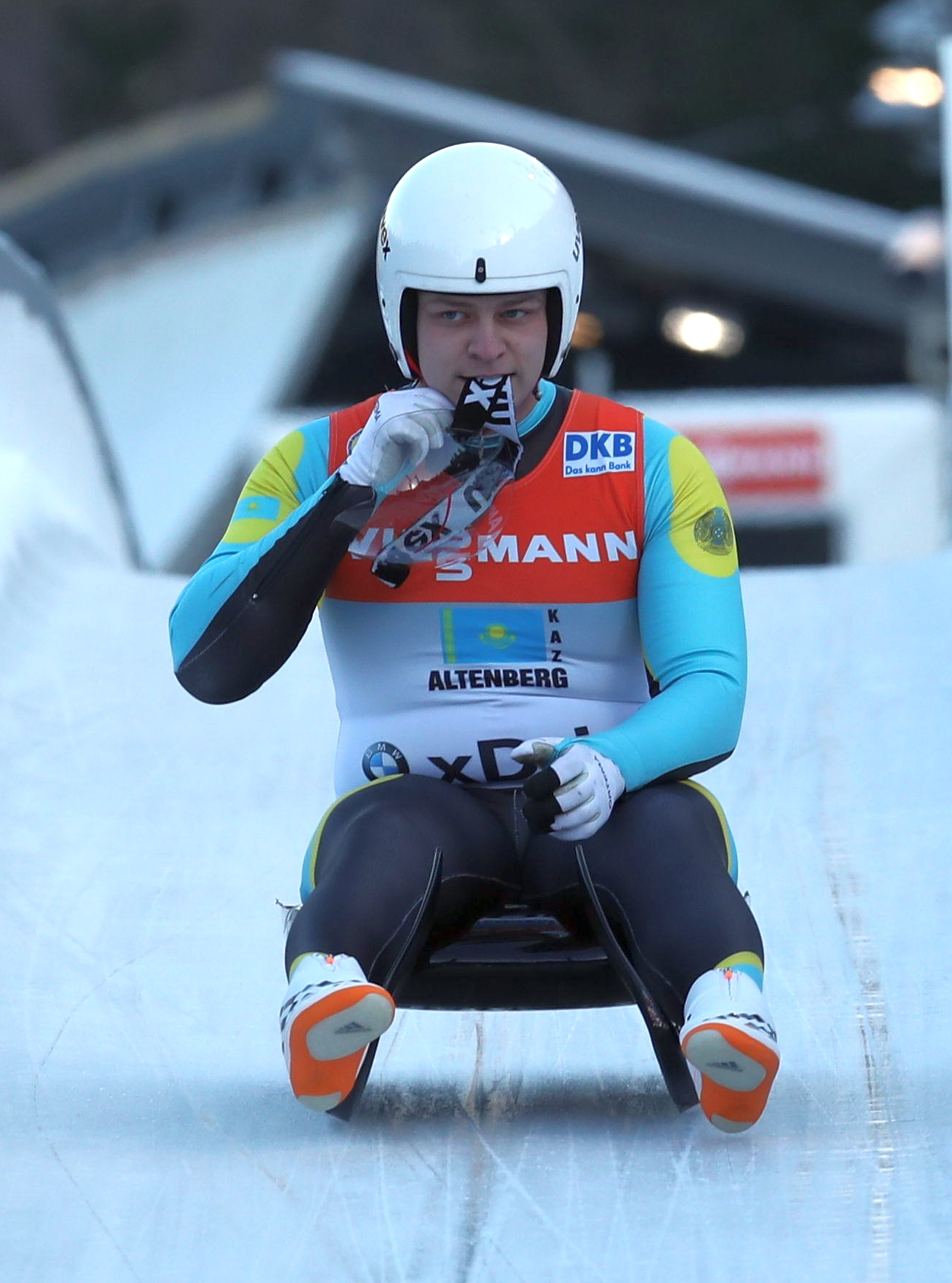
- Kopyrenko in 2017

Personal information
- Nationality: Kazakhstani
- Born: 14 March 1998 (age 28)
- Height: 1.80 m (5 ft 11 in)
- Weight: 90 kg (198 lb)

Sport
- Sport: Luge

Nikita Kopyrenko (Никита Павлович Копыренко, born 14 March 1998) is a Kazakhstan luger. He competed in the 2018 Winter Olympics.
