= Franz Fischnaller =

Italian artist

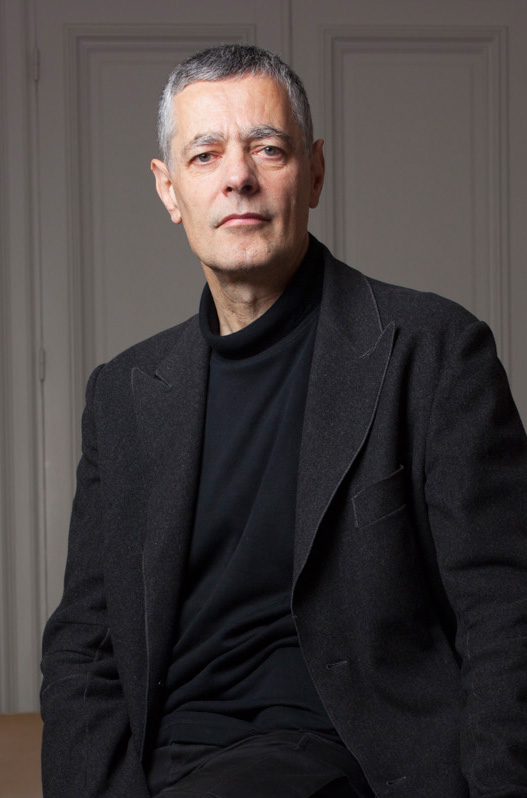
Franz Fischnaller

Franz Fischnaller (born 1954 in Bolzano, Alto Adige, Italy) is a new media artist and transdisciplinary researcher. He is recognized for the creation of his digital, virtual reality and interactive art installations works across the fields of art, technology, humanities and cultural heritage.

== Works ==
Fischnaller comes from a classical art background, using techniques such as painting, engraving, drawing, sculpture, frescoes and mixed media.

His methods and creative approach evolved from the classical to the digital media art. His cross-disciplinary research and methods allowed him to combine classical art techniques with new media and virtual technologies, exploring new art forms, that led to the birth of his current digital style.

He has created a representative number of works such as digital media productions, immersive real time simulations, virtual reality and augmented reality applications with three dimensional stereoscopic content, interactive virtual journey, creative interfaces, online collaborative shared environments. Several of these works relate to the cultural heritage of the Italian Renaissance (buildings, monuments, works of art, artifacts, archeological sites and cities).

=== Lautriv Chromagnon Medusa ===
Interacting with Lautriv Chromagnon Medusa at the National Museum of Science and Technology Leonardo da Vinci, Milan, Italy

He became known in the digital art field in 1995 when he created with the collaboration of the National Museum of Science and Technology Leonardo da Vinci, Milan the Lautriv Chromagnon Medusa, one of his first augmented reality interactive installations.

=== Multi mega book in the CAVE ===
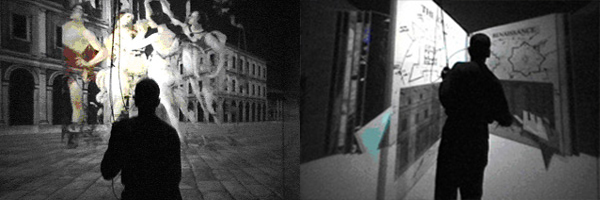
Navigating and Interacting with Multi mega book in the Cave automatic virtual environment (CAVE) at the Electronic Visualization Laboratory, University of Illinois at Chicago

After 1995, to pursue his research, he worked in Germany, Austria, and USA with museum labs and institutions amongst which: Medienmuseum ZKM | Zentrum für Kunst und Design, Karlsruhe, Germany, Electronic Visualization Laboratory, School of Art & Design at the University of Illinois at Chicago and AEC Electronic, the Museum of the Future, Linz, Austria. As an outcome of this research, he created a full immersive stereo virtual reality application entitled the Multi mega book in the CAVE, a virtual reality application permanently exhibited in the CAVE, a multi-person, room-sized, high-resolution 3D video and audio environment invented in the Electronic Visualization Laboratory at the University of Illinois at Chicago.

=== The Last Supper Interactive ===
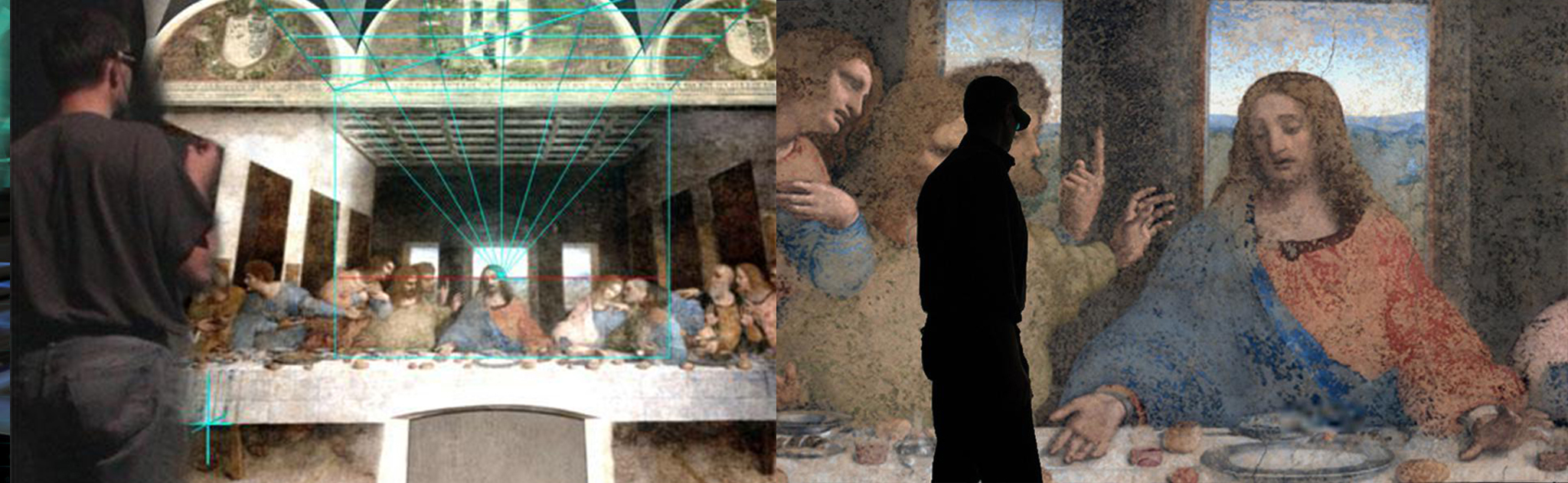
Last Supper interactive. 2012 virtual reality application displayed in stereoscopic ultra-high resolution 4K-3D HD. Research accomplished with University of Essex, Bristol and Visionair (European infrastructure for high level visualization facilities

From 1997 to 2015, he created and completed The Last Supper Interactive, a real-time immersive and interactive, virtual narrative stereo application based on the Last Supper (Italian: L'Ultima Cena), a late 15th-century mural painting by Leonardo da Vinci located in the refectory of the Convent of Santa Maria delle Grazie, in Milan, Italy. Alberti's theorem virtual tool, a virtual immersive interactive learning device, inspired by Leon Battista Alberti's rules of linear perspective (Costruzione Legittima) was designed and implemented for The Last Supper Interactive, serving as an interactive tool for the user.

=== City Cluster ===
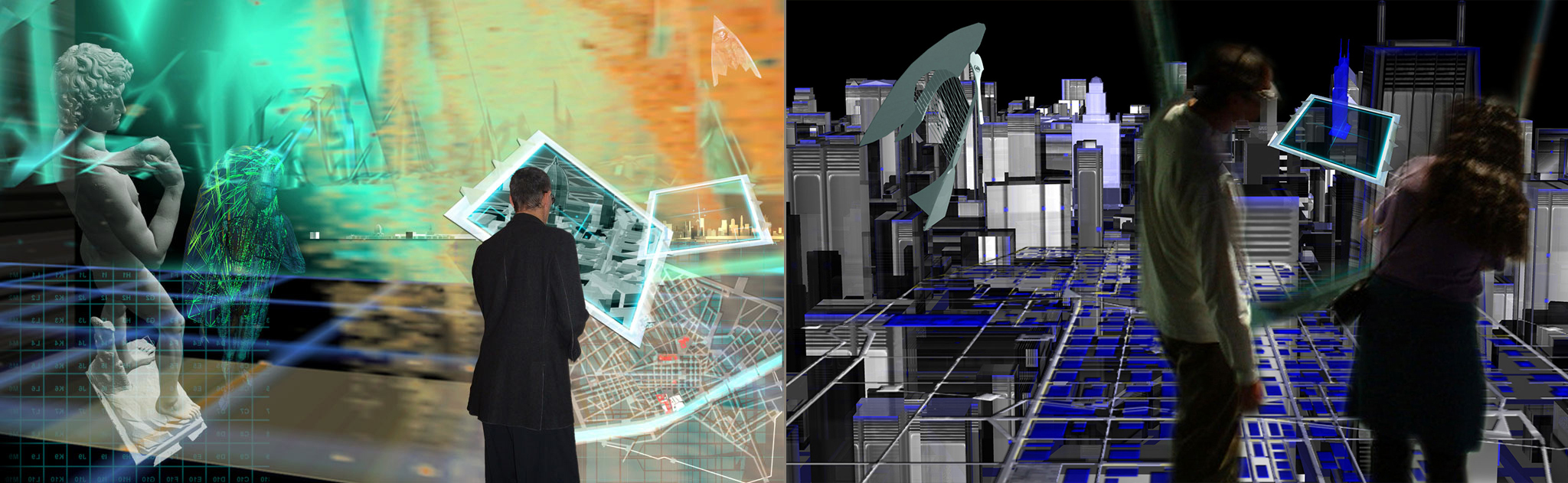
City Cluster.2003. Official Opening & high speed real time exhibit between Chicago and Florence across two Virtual Reality Networking platforms- the Cave automatic virtual environment Display-Electronic Visualization Laboratory - University of Illinois at Chicago; and the AGAVE Display System - Palazzo Vecchio, Florence

From 2001 to 2006, he moved to the USA to work as senior professor of art and technology, electronic visualization, digital media, and electronic arts at the Electronic Visualization Laboratory, School of Art & Design, University of Illinois, Chicago, and leader of the Electronic Visualization Program. CityCluster was created at the University of Illinois at Chicago from 2004 to 2005 in collaboration with the Electronic Visualization Laboratory, a graduate research laboratory specializing in virtual reality and real-time interactive computer graphics. It is a joint effort venture of the University of Illinois at Chicago's College of Engineering and the School of Art and Design which have developed the CAVE and ImmersaDesk virtual-reality systems.

== Awards ==
- 1995: Interactive Art Honorable Mention Prize, Prix Ars Electronica, at Ars Electronic Center, Linz, Austria, for the project, Lautriv Chromagnon Medusa
- 1997: Recipient, Foreign Title Award in the Theater and Exhibition Section, Multimedia Grand Prix'97, Japan, for the Multi Mega Book in the CAVE
- 1999: Recipient, Interactive Art Honorable Mention Prize for Prix Ars Electronica, Ars Electronic Center, Linz, Austria, for Robots Avatars Dealing with Virtual Illusions
