= Tilen Sirše =

Slovenian luger (born 1990)

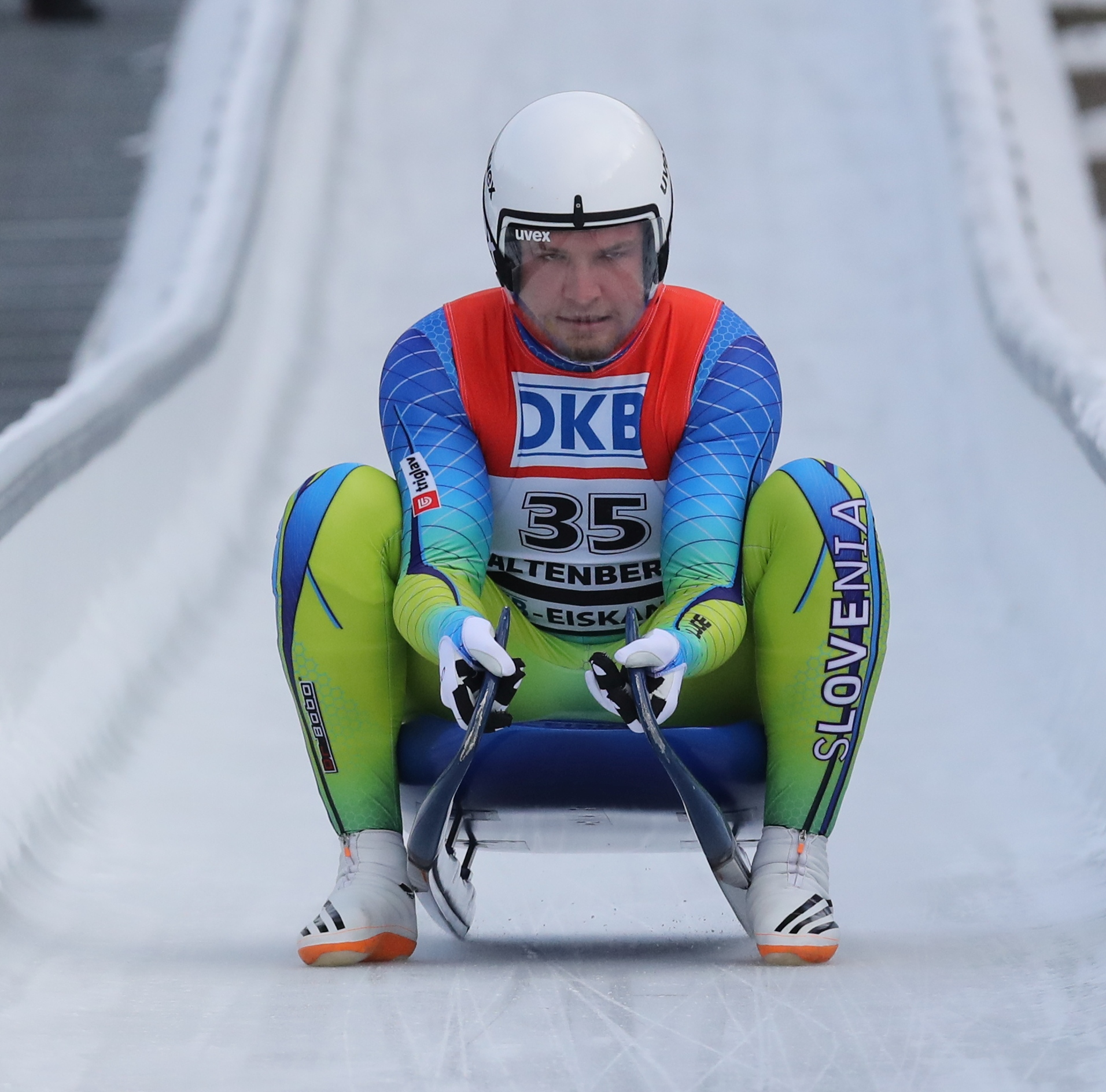

Tilen Sirše (born 21 December 1990) is a Slovenian slider.

Sirše represented Slovenia in Men's singles at the 2018 Winter Olympics in Pyeongchang, South Korea.
