= Tristan Jeskanen =

Finnish-American luger

Tristan Jeskanen (born February 5, 1996) is a Finnish and American luger, holding citizenship from both nations but competing athletically for Finland. His father Sami Jeskanen moved from Lahti, Finland to the United States, where he currently teaches Canadian Studies at the State University of New York Plattsburgh. Tristan Jeskanen himself lived for some time at a younger age in Finland. As of 2016 he was residing in Lahti, Finland.

In 2015, Jeskanen became the first Finnish luger to qualify for a Luge World Cup event. At the Lake Placid event of the 2015-16 Luge World Cup circuit Jeskanen finished 29th in the men's luge singles event. Jeskanen became the first Finn to participate in the luge World Cup and the first Finn to gain points in a Viessmann luge World Cup discipline. Previously the only other Finn to ever place in FIL history was Ray Lindfors who raced for Sweden and placed 16th in 1974 FIL World Championship held in Königssee.
