= Giorgi Sogoiani =

Georgian luger (born 1997)

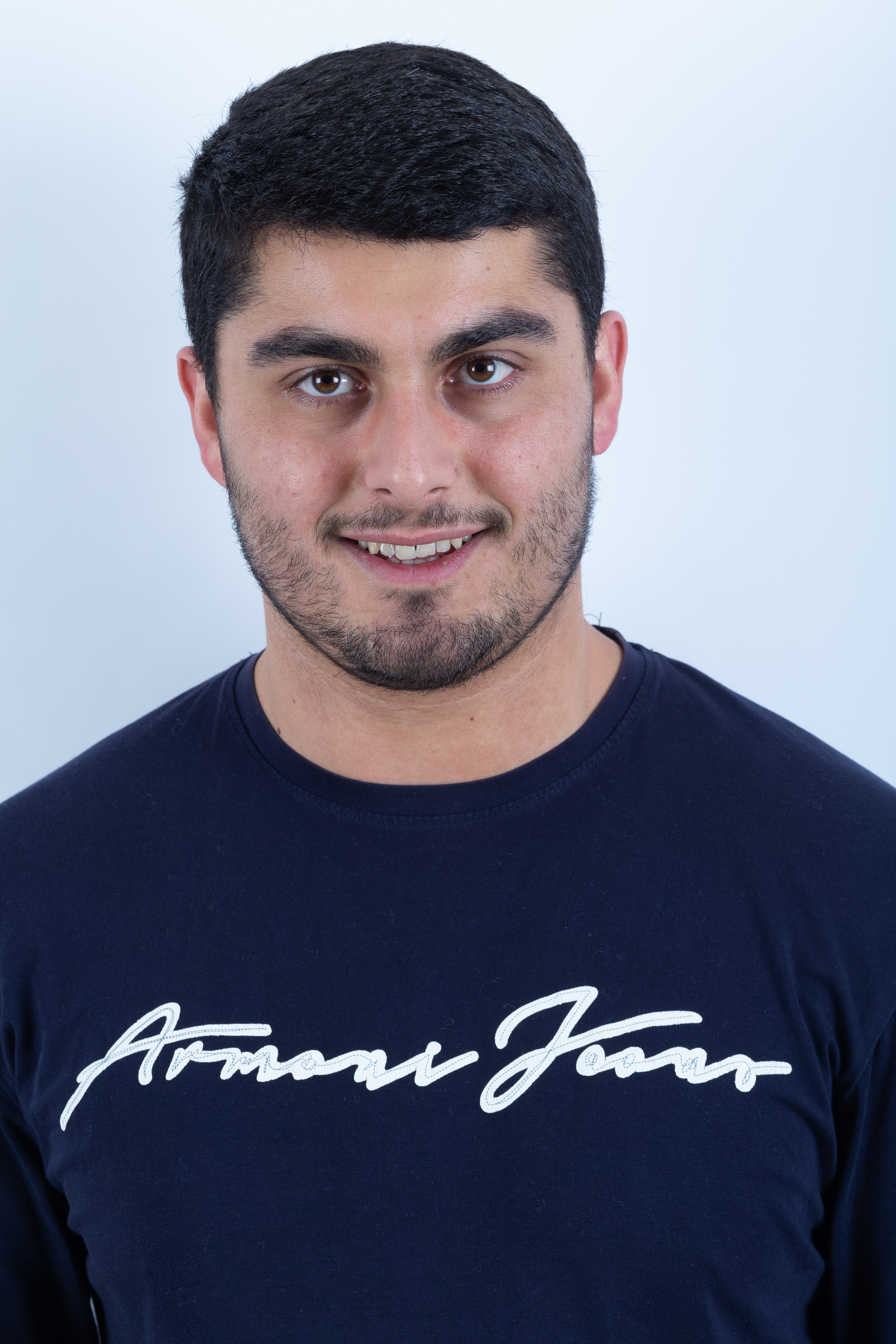
- Sogoiani in 2018

Personal information
- Nationality: Georgian
- Born: 7 July 1997 (age 28)
- Height: 1.80 m (5 ft 11 in)
- Weight: 75 kg (165 lb)

Sport
- Sport: Luge

Giorgi Sogoiani (Georgian: გიორგი სოღოიანი, pronounced [ɡioɾɡi soɣoiani]; born 7 July 1997) is a Georgian luger. He competed in the 2018 Winter Olympics.
