= Rupert Staudinger =

British-German luger

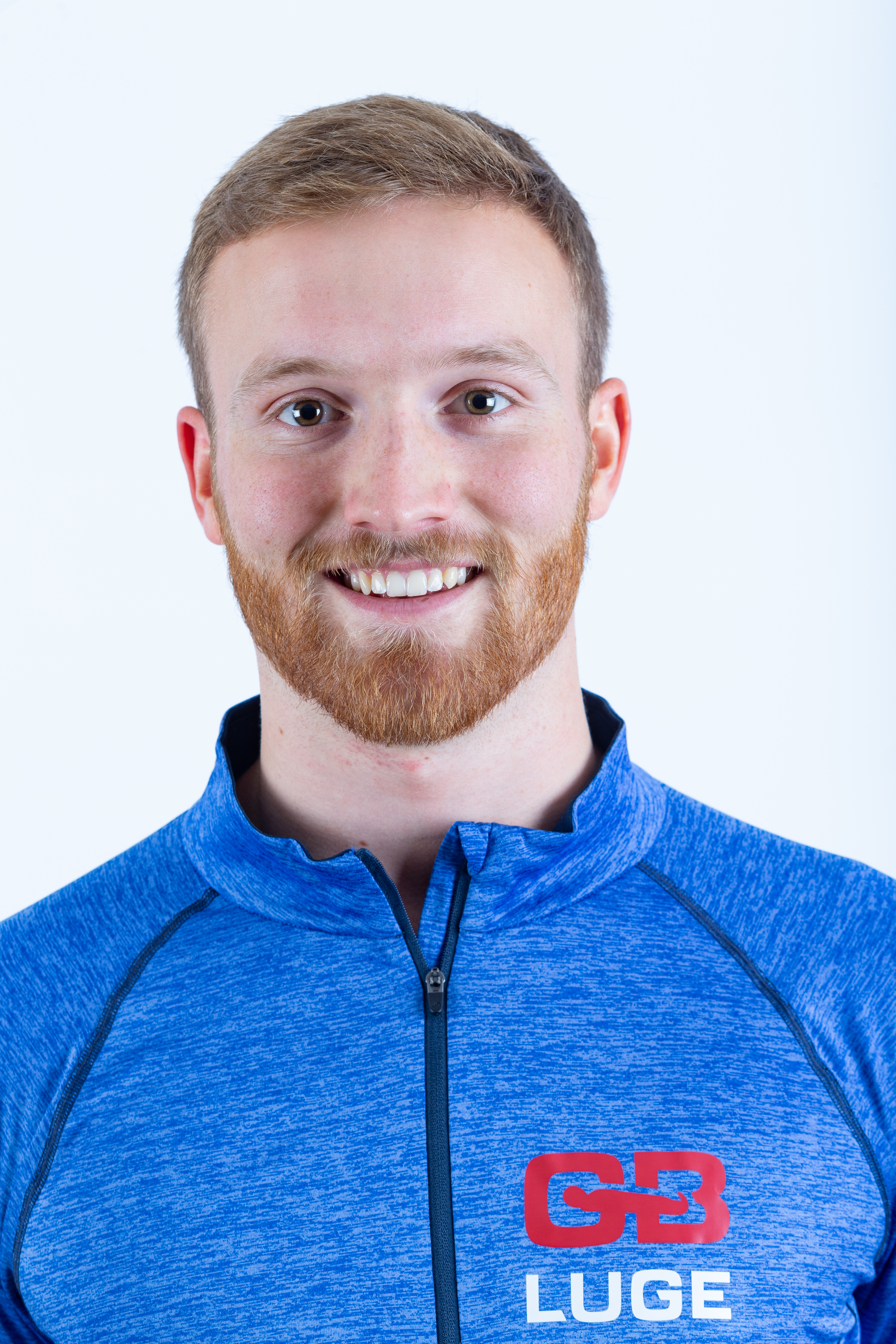
- Staudinger in 2018

Personal information
- Nationality: British-German
- Born: 15 July 1997 (age 29) Berchtesgaden, Germany
- Height: 188 cm (6 ft 2 in)
- Weight: 80 kg (176 lb)

Sport
- Sport: Luge

Rupert Staudinger (born 15 July 1997) is a British-German luger. Born in Berchtesgaden in Bavaria to a German father and a Welsh mother, he grew up in Schönau am Königssee.

Staudinger competed for the United Kingdom in the men's singles event at the 2018 Winter Olympics. Since no British athlete qualified for the 2014 Winter Olympics, luge did not receive UK Sport funding for the 2018 Olympic cycle. Staudinger still qualified for the 2018 Winter Olympics and finished in 33rd place despite posting his best time.
