= Semen Pavlichenko =

Russian luger (born 1991)

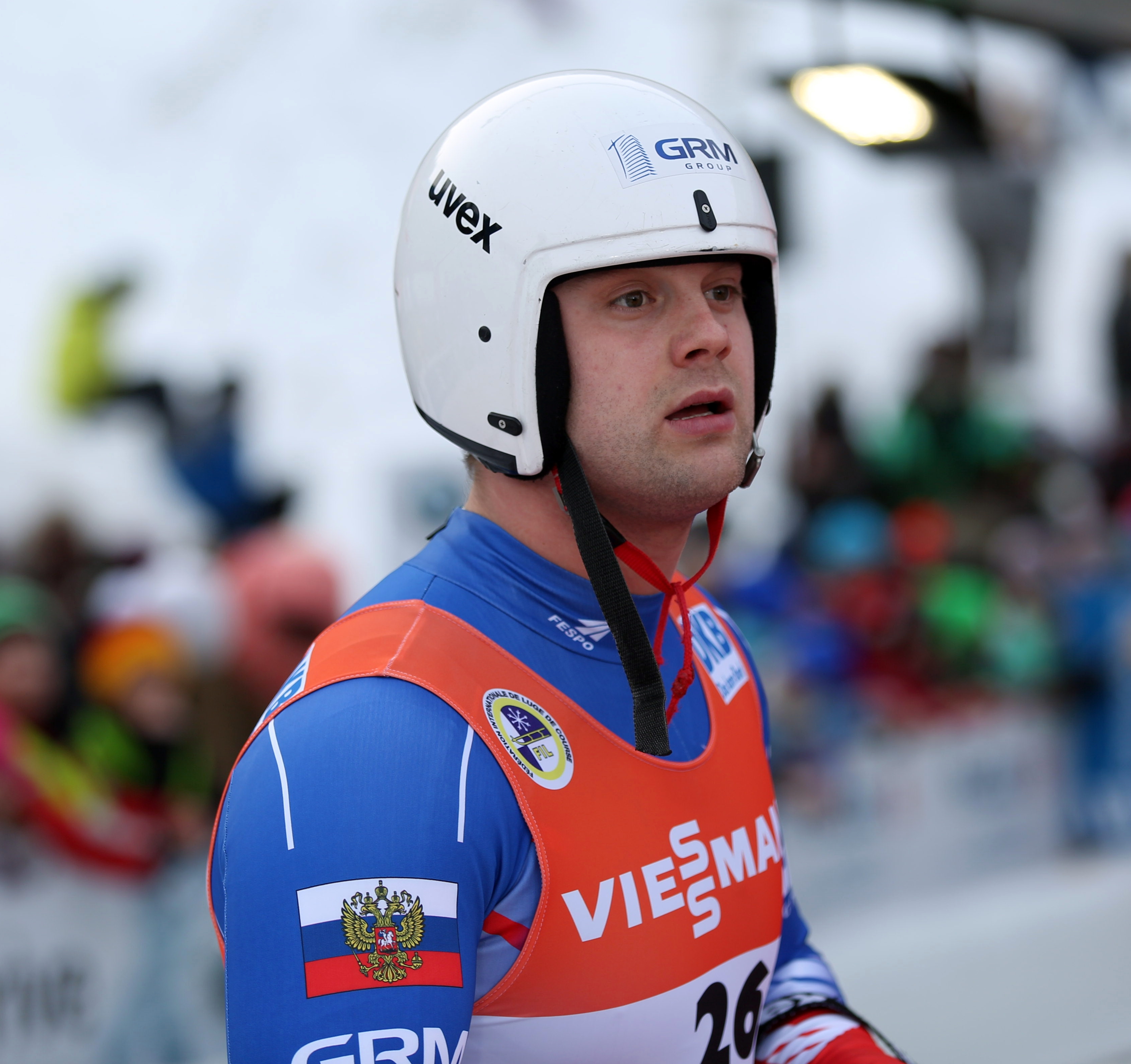
- Pavlichenko in 2017

Personal information
- Full name: Semyon Aleksandrovich Pavlichenko
- Nationality: Russian
- Born: 11 May 1991 (age 35) Bratsk, RSFSR, USSR (now Russia)
- Height: 1.80 m (5 ft 11 in)
- Weight: 67 kg (148 lb)

Sport
- Country: Russia
- Sport: Luge
- Event: Singles
Medal record
Men's luge
Representing Russia
World Championships
Gold medal – first place	2015 Sigulda	Singles
Gold medal – first place	2019 Winterberg	Mixed team
Silver medal – second place	2015 Sigulda	Mixed team
Bronze medal – third place	2019 Winterberg	Singles
Bronze medal – third place	2019 Winterberg	Sprint
European Championships
Gold medal – first place	2015 Sochi	Singles
Gold medal – first place	2017 Königssee	Singles
Gold medal – first place	2018 Sigulda	Singles
Gold medal – first place	2018 Sigulda	Mixed team
Gold medal – first place	2019 Oberhof	Singles
Gold medal – first place	2021 Sigulda	Mixed team
Silver medal – second place	2015 Sochi	Mixed team
Silver medal – second place	2020 Lillehammer	Singles
Representing Russian Luge Federation
World Championships
Silver medal – second place	2021 Königssee	Sprint

Semen Aleksandrovich Pavlichenko (Russian: Семё́н Алекса́ндрович Павличе́нко; born 11 May 1991) is a Russian luger. He competed at the 2014 Winter Olympics and 2018 Winter Olympics.

== World Cup podiums ==
Season	Date	Location	Discipline	Place
2014–15	18 January 2015	Oberhof, Germany	Team Relay	3rd
2014–15	1 February 2015	Lillehammer, Norway	Singles	2nd
2014–15	1 February 2015	Lillehammer, Norway	Team Relay	2nd
2014–15	1 March 2015	Sochi, Russia	Singles	1st
2014–15	1 March 2015	Sochi, Russia	Team Relay	2nd
2015–16	5 December 2015	Lake Placid, United States	Team Relay	3rd
2015–16	10 January 2016	Sigulda, Latvia	Singles	2nd
2015–16	10 January 2016	Sigulda, Latvia	Team Relay	3rd
2015–16	7 February 2016	Sochi, Russia	Team Relay	1st
2016–17	2 December 2016	Lake Placid, United States	Singles	2nd
2016–17	3 December 2016	Lake Placid, United States	Team Relay	2nd
2016–17	6 January 2017	Königssee, Germany	Singles	1st
2016–17	15 January 2017	Sigulda, Latvia	Singles	1st
2016–17	15 January 2017	Sigulda, Latvia	Singles (sprint)	2nd
2016–17	15 January 2017	Sigulda, Latvia	Team Relay	1st
2017–18	19 November 2017	Innsbruck, Austria	Singles	1st
2017–18	19 November 2017	Innsbruck, Austria	Team Relay	3rd
2017–18	26 November 2017	Winterberg, Germany	Singles (sprint)	2nd
2017–18	16 December 2017	Lake Placid, United States	Singles	2nd
2017–18	14 January 2018	Oberhof, Germany	Singles	2nd
2017–18	21 January 2018	Lillehammer, Norway	Singles (sprint)	1st
2017–18	28 January 2018	Sigulda, Latvia	Singles	1st
2017–18	28 January 2018	Sigulda, Latvia	Team Relay	1st
2018–19	1 December 2018	Whistler, Canada	Team Relay	1st
2018–19	16 December 2018	Lake Placid, United States	Singles (sprint)	2nd
2018–19	13 January 2019	Sigulda, Latvia	Singles	1st
2018–19	13 January 2019	Sigulda, Latvia	Team Relay	2nd
2018–19	9 February 2019	Oberhof, Germany	Singles	1st
2018–19	24 February 2019	Sochi, Russia	Singles	1st
2018–19	24 February 2019	Sochi, Russia	Singles (sprint)	1st
2018–19	24 February 2019	Sochi, Russia	Team Relay	1st
2019–20	12 January 2020	Altenberg, Germany	Team Relay	1st
2019–20	19 January 2020	Lillehammer, Norway	Singles	2nd
2019–20	26 January 2020	Sigulda, Latvia	Singles (sprint)	1st
2019–20	1 February 2020	Oberhof, Germany	Singles	2nd
2019–20	23 February 2020	Winterberg, Germany	Team Relay	1st
2019–20	1 March 2020	Königssee, Germany	Singles	1st
2019–20	1 March 2020	Königssee, Germany	Team Relay	3rd
2020–21	29 November 2020	Innsbruck, Austria	Team Relay	3rd
2020–21	6 December 2020	Altenberg, Germany	Team Relay	2nd
2020–21	10 January 2021	Sigulda, Latvia	Team Relay	1st
2020–21	23 January 2021	Innsbruck, Austria	Singles	2nd
2020–21	24 January 2021	Innsbruck, Austria	Singles (Sprint)	1st
2020–21	28 November 2021	Sochi, Russia	Team relay	1st

=== Season titles ===
- 1 titles – (1 singles)

Season	Discipline
2019	Men's singles

== Biography ==
Semen Pavlichenko was born on 11 May 1991 in Bratsk, Irkutsk Oblast, Russia. He began practicing luge at the age of ten at a local youth sports school, where he trained under coach Eduard Burmistrov, a former professional luger. In 2019, he graduated from Pushkin Leningrad State University with a degree in physical education.

Pavlichenko made his debut in the Luge World Cup during the 2007–08 season, finishing 43rd in the overall standings. In 2009, he won silver at the Russian National Championships and bronze at the Junior World Championships in Nagano. A year later, he won silver at the Junior World Championships in Igls, Austria. During the 2010–11 season, he finished 21st in the overall World Cup standings.

In February 2015, Pavlichenko won gold at the World Championships in Sigulda, Latvia — the first such title for Russia in men’s singles since Soviet luger Sergey Danilin’s victory in 1981. In February 2019, he won the European Championships in Oberhof, Germany.
