= Jakub Šimoňák =

Slovak luger

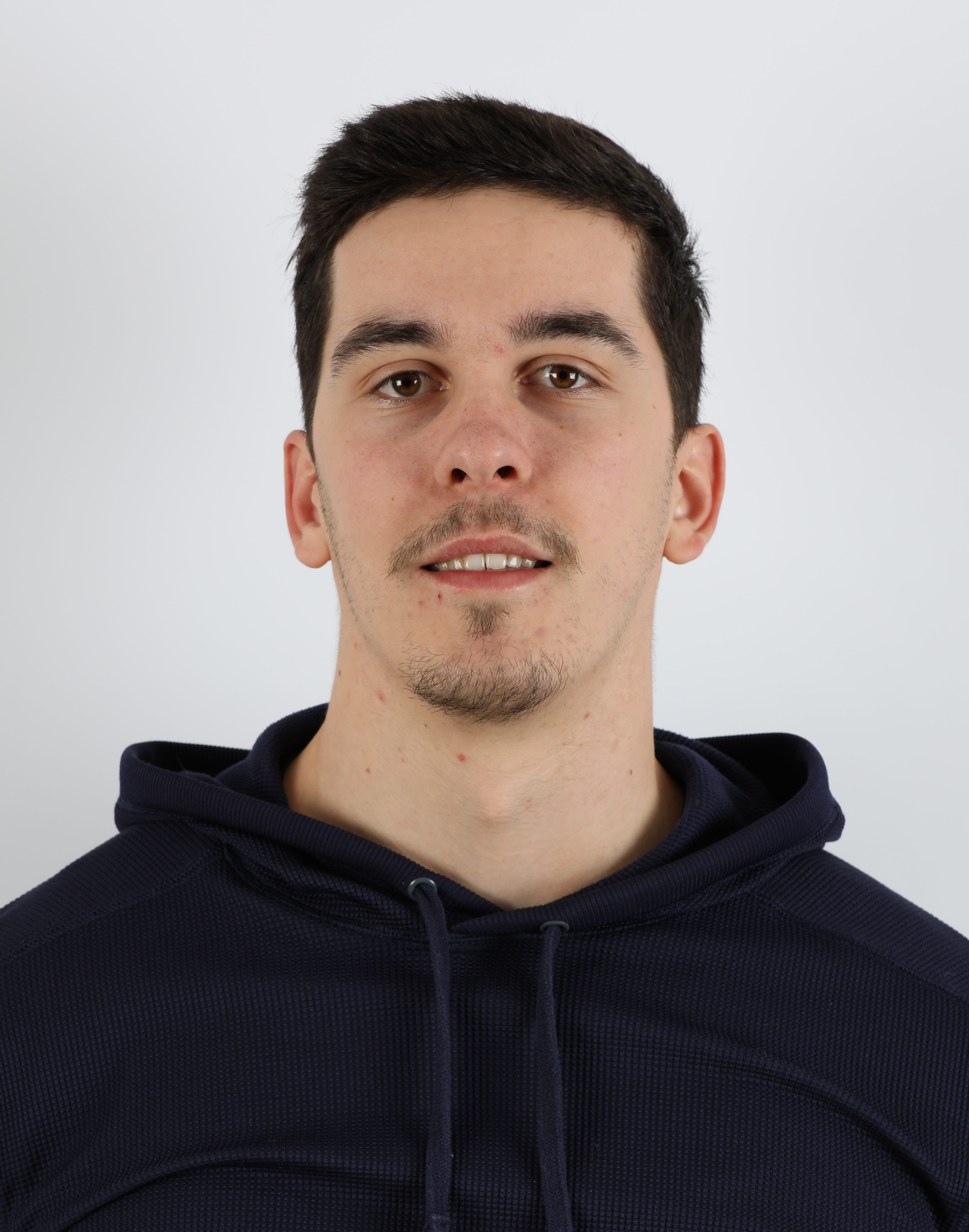

Personal information
- Nationality: Slovak
- Born: 5 June 1996 (age 28); Spišská Nová Ves, Slovakia
- Height: 192 cm (6 ft 4 in)
- Weight: 92 kg (203 lb)

Sport
- Sport: Luge

Jakub Šimoňák (born 5 June 1996) is a Slovak luger. He competed in the men's singles event at the 2018 Winter Olympics.
