= Pavel Angelov =

Bulgarian luger (born 1991)

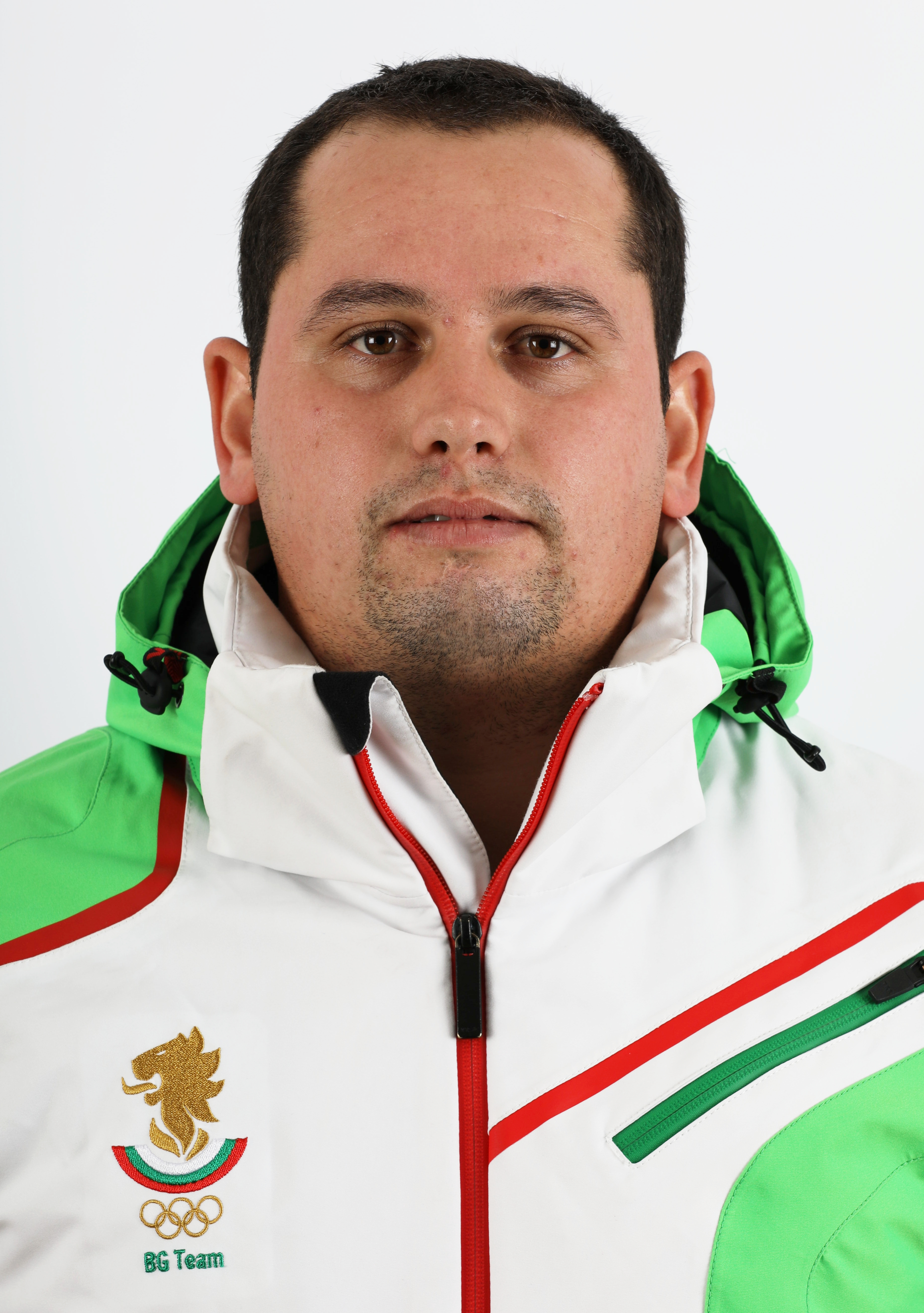
- Angelov in 2018

Personal information
- Nationality: Bulgarian
- Born: 17 September 1991 (age 34) Krumovgrad, Bulgaria

Sport
- Sport: Luge

Pavel Angelov (Bulgarian: Павел Ангелов) (born 17 September 1991) is a Bulgarian luger. He competed in the men's singles event at the 2018 Winter Olympics.
