= Andrei Turea =

Romanian luger (born 1998)

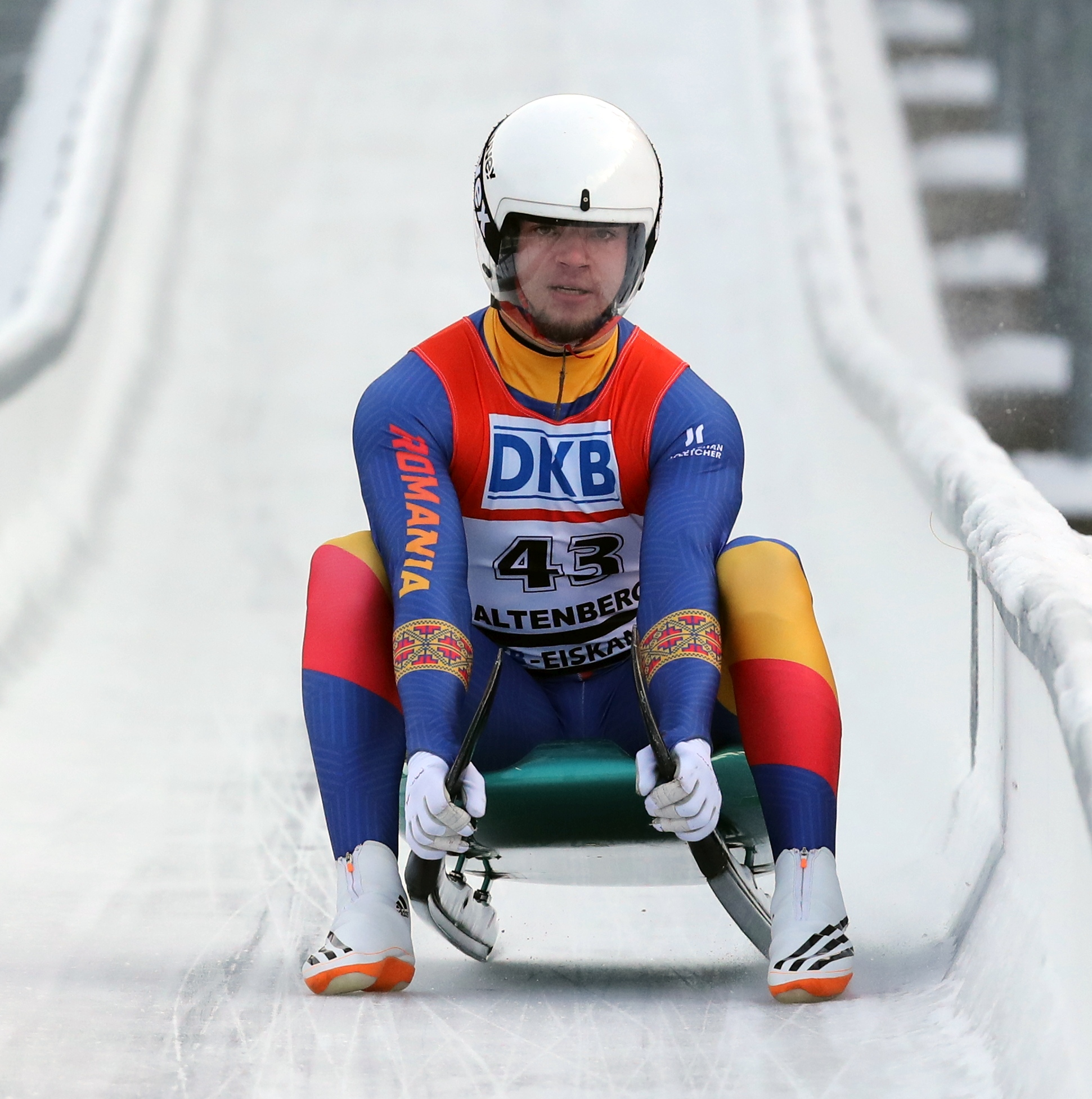
- Turea in 2017

Personal information
- Full name: Theodor Andrei Aurelian Turea
- Nationality: Romanian
- Born: 11 October 1998 (age 26)
- Height: 184 cm (6 ft 0 in)
- Weight: 88 kg (194 lb)

Sport
- Sport: Luge

Andrei Turea (born 11 October 1998) is a Romanian luger. He competed in the men's singles event at the 2018 Winter Olympics.
