= Johannes Ludwig =

German luger (born 1986)

Johannes Bartholt Ludwig
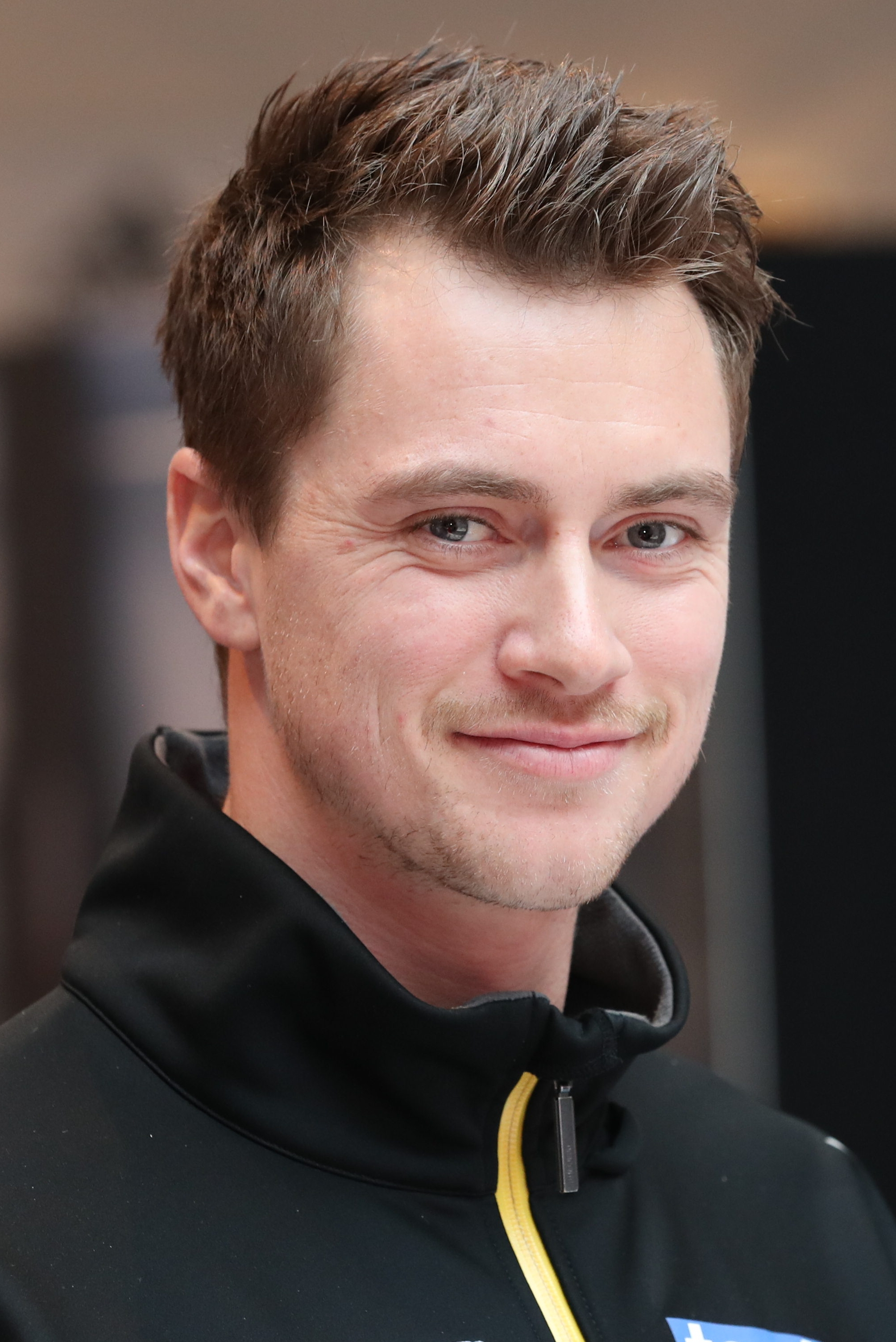
- Ludwig in 2018

Personal information
- Nationality: German
- Born: 14 February 1986 (age 40) Suhl, East Germany
- Height: 1.87 m (6 ft 2 in)
- Weight: 88.8 kg (196 lb)

Sport
- Country: Germany
- Sport: Luge
- Event: Singles
- Club: WSV Oberhof 05 e.V.
Medal record
Men's luge
Representing Germany
Olympic Games
Gold medal – first place	2018 Pyeongchang	Team relay
Gold medal – first place	2022 Beijing	Singles
Gold medal – first place	2022 Beijing	Team relay
Bronze medal – third place	2018 Pyeongchang	Singles
World Championships
Gold medal – first place	2017 Igls	Team relay
Gold medal – first place	2020 Sochi	Team relay
Bronze medal – third place	2013 Whistler	Singles
European Championships
Silver medal – second place	2014 Sigulda	Singles
Silver medal – second place	2019 Oberhof	Team relay
Silver medal – second place	2021 Sigulda	Singles
Silver medal – second place	2022 St. Moritz	Team relay
Bronze medal – third place	2010 Sigulda	Team relay
Bronze medal – third place	2013 Oberhof	Singles
World Cup
Event	1st	2nd	3rd
Singles	10	9	12
Sprint	0	1	3
Team relay	3	3	0
Total	13	13	15
- Updated as of 20 February 2022

Johannes Ludwig (born 14 February 1986) is a retired Olympic gold medal-winning German luger. He won a bronze medal in the Team relay event at the FIL European Luge Championships 2010 in Sigulda. At the 2018 Winter Olympics, held in Pyeongchang, South Korea, Ludwig won the bronze medal in the men's singles luge and the gold in the team relay luge, along with his teammates Natalie Geisenberger, Tobias Wendl, and Tobias Arlt. Then at the 2022 Winter Olympics in Beijing, he won the gold medal in the Men's singles race.

== Career ==
Ludwig's finished 11th in the men's singles event at the 2007 FIL World Luge Championships in Igls, Austria. His best Luge World Cup overall finish was 11th twice (2006-7, 2007-8).

Ludwig failed to qualify for the 2010 Winter Olympics in Vancouver and the 2014 Winter Olympics in Sochi. At the 2018 Winter Olympics, held in Pyeongchang, South Korea, Ludwig won the bronze medal in the men's singles luge. Ludwig's teammate Felix Loch was the defending champion and favourite to win. He was in the lead until his final run, when he skidded during his final run and lost time, finishing in fifth place. Lugwig was also one of the gold-medal winners in the team relay luge, along with teammates Natalie Geisenberger, Tobias Wendl, and Tobias Arlt. Ludwig said, "The whole story is very special for me; I was fighting, fighting, fighting, and now I made it and get two medals".

Ludwig won his second gold medal at the Olympics by winning the Men's singles event at the 2022 Winter Olympics in Beijing. On 16 May 2022, Ludwig announced his retirement on social media.

== Luge results ==
=== World Cup ===
Season	Doubles									Sprint				Team relay						Points	Overall	Doubles	Sprint
Season	1	2	3	4	5	6	7	8	9	1	2	3	4	1	2	3	4	5	6	Points	Overall	Doubles	Sprint
2006–07	11	5	8	11	12	19	–	7	15	—N/a	—N/a	—N/a	—N/a	–	–	–	–	—N/a	—N/a	291	11th	—N/a	—N/a
2007–08	8	11	7	19	–	4	17	19	—N/a	—N/a	—N/a	—N/a	—N/a	–	–	–	–	—N/a	—N/a	250	11th	—N/a	—N/a
2008–09	11	9	3	19	13	6	6	23	4	—N/a	—N/a	—N/a	—N/a	–	–	–	–	–	—N/a	373	8th	—N/a	—N/a
2009–10	19	15	5	10	29	4	2	3	—N/a	—N/a	—N/a	—N/a	—N/a	–	–	–	1	–	—N/a	366	6th	—N/a	—N/a
2011–12	4	2	6	3	7	5	3	4	11	—N/a	—N/a	—N/a	—N/a	–	–	–	–	–	–	530	5th	—N/a	—N/a
2012–13	3	8	3	4	9	3	5	13	7	—N/a	—N/a	—N/a	—N/a	—	—	—	—	—	—	482	6th	—N/a	—N/a
2013–14	24	12	17	13	10	26	–	8	2	—N/a	—N/a	—N/a	—N/a	–	–	–	–	–	–	281	12th	—N/a	—N/a
2014–15	19	8	23	–	–	6	11	2	15	–	–	8	—N/a	–	–	–	–	–	–			—N/a	—N/a
2015–16	6	7	7	6	10	6	–	7	24	6	11	4	—N/a	–	–	–	–	–	–	481	8th		
2016–17	1	9	7	10	19	11	4	6	3	3	DSQ	13	—N/a	–	–	–	–	–	–	557	5th		
2017–18	19	11	8	5	4	3	6	4	8	7	2	11	5	–	–	–	–	–	–				—N/a
2018–19	1	5	6	2	20	12	3	5	12	4	3	10	—N/a	–	–	–	–	2	–	666	4th		
2019–20	15	14	4	8	8	1	1	1	5	11	13	14	—N/a	–	–	4	1	–	–				
2020–21	2	11	2	6	3	2	4	3	8	6	7	9	—N/a	–	–	–	–	–	CNX	716	2nd		
2021–22	1	1	2	3	1	1	13	1	11	6	3	12	4	7	2	–	4	1	2	871	1st		
