= Aleksandr Gorbatcevich =

Russian luger (born 1994)

Aleksandr Gorbatsevich
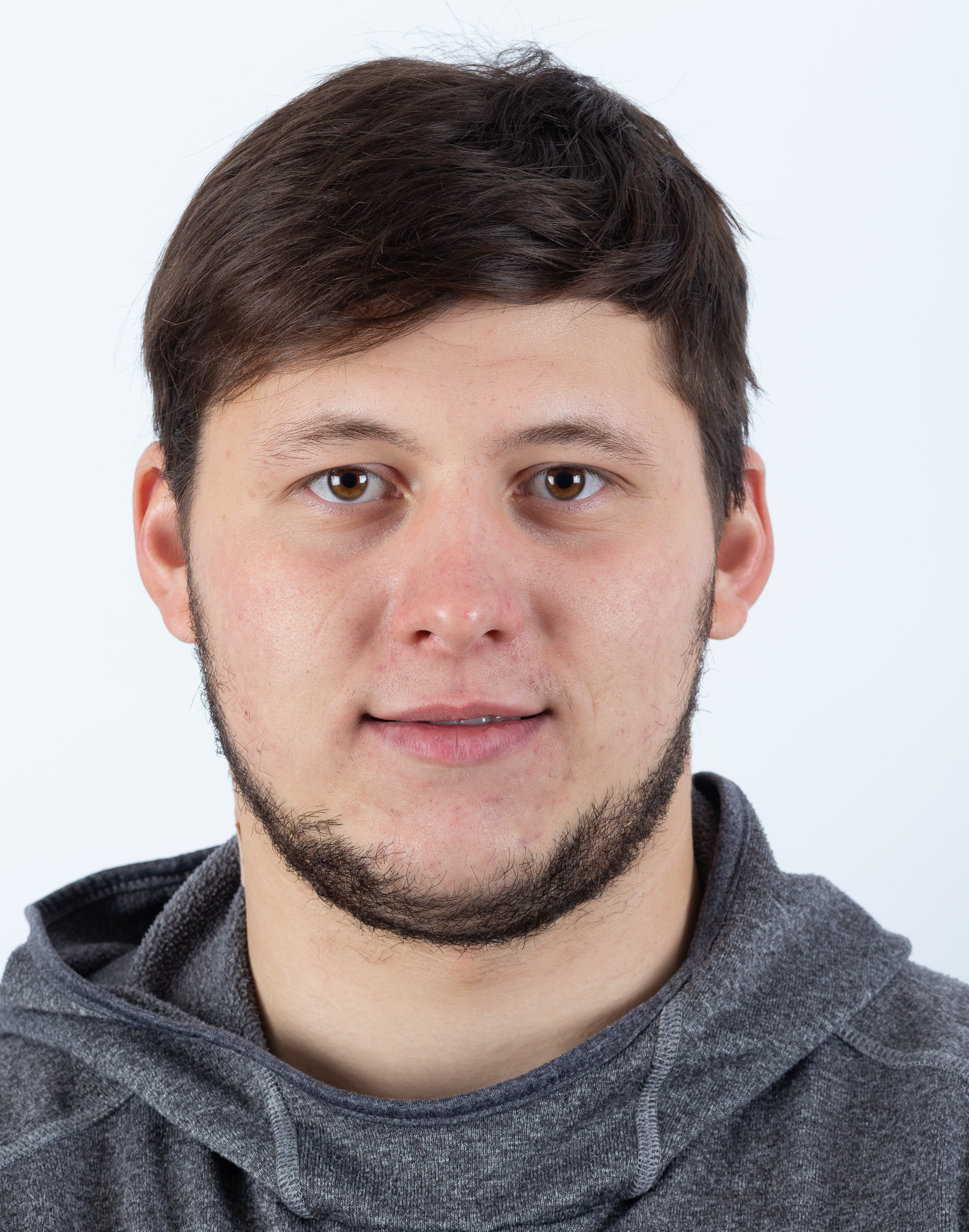
- Gorbatsevich in 2018

Personal information
- Full name: Aleksandr Leonidovich Gorbatsevich
- Born: 16 August 1994 (age 30); Bratsk

Sport
- Country: Russia
- Sport: Luge

Aleksandr Leonidovich Gorbatsevich (Russian: Александр Леонидович Горбацевич; born 16 August 1994) is a Russian luger who competes internationally.

He represented his country's Olympic committee at the 2022 Winter Olympics.
