= Artūrs Dārznieks =

Latvian luger (born 1993)

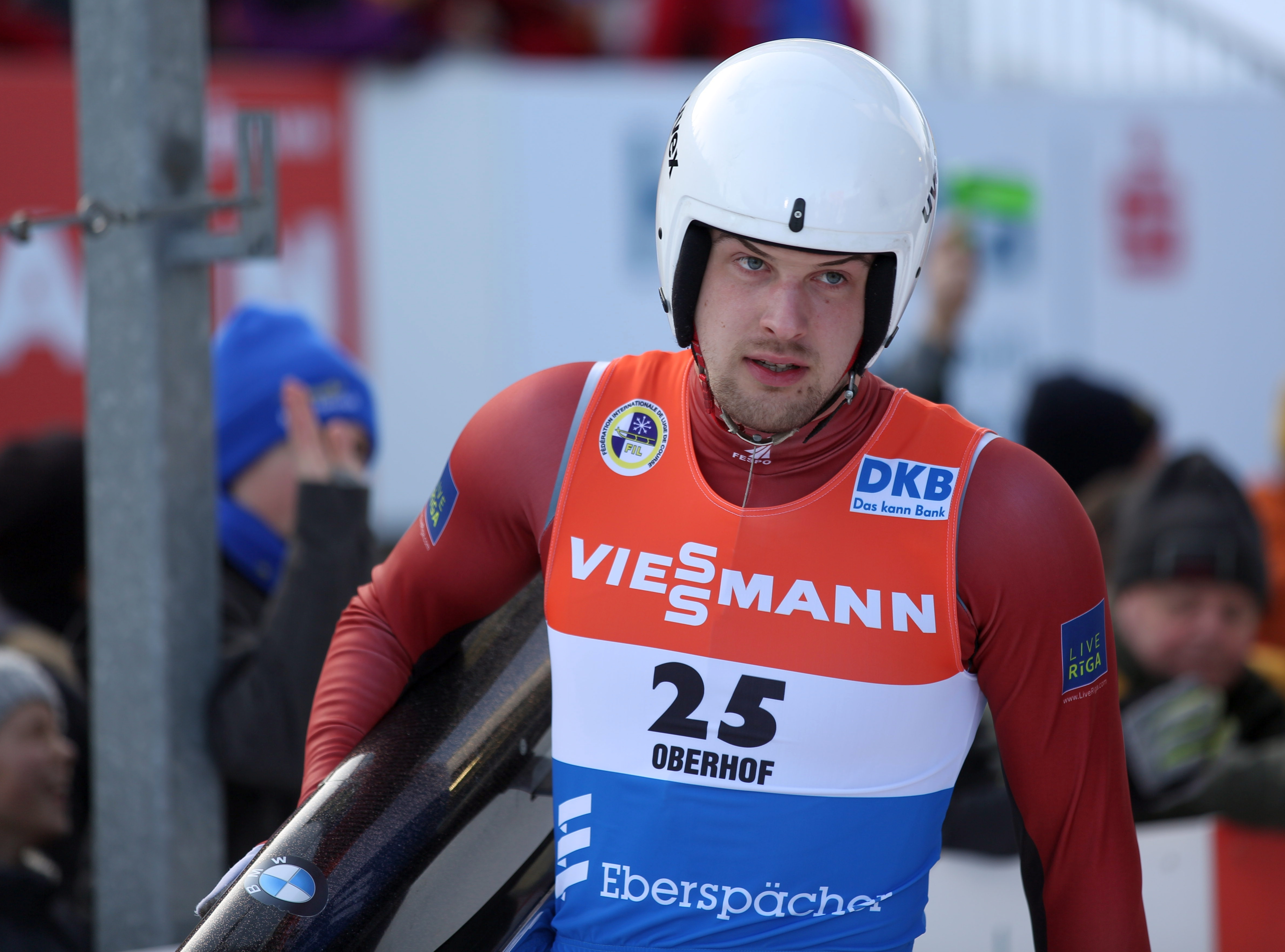
- Dārznieks in Oberhof in 2017

Personal information
- Nationality: Latvian
- Born: 20 April 1993 (age 33) Jēkabpils, Latvia
- Height: 1.88 m (6 ft 2 in)
- Weight: 80 kg (176 lb)

Sport
- Country: Latvia
- Sport: Luge
- Event: Singles
Medal record
Representing Latvia
World Championships
Bronze medal – third place	2021 Königssee	Mixed team
European Championships
Silver medal – second place	2016 Altenberg	Mixed team
Silver medal – second place	2021 Sigulda	Mixed team
Bronze medal – third place	2017 Königssee	Mixed team

Artūrs Dārznieks (born 20 April 1993) is a Latvian luger. He competed in the men's singles event at the 2018 Winter Olympics, and at the 2022 Winter Olympics.
