= Kevin Fischnaller =

Italian luger (born 1993)

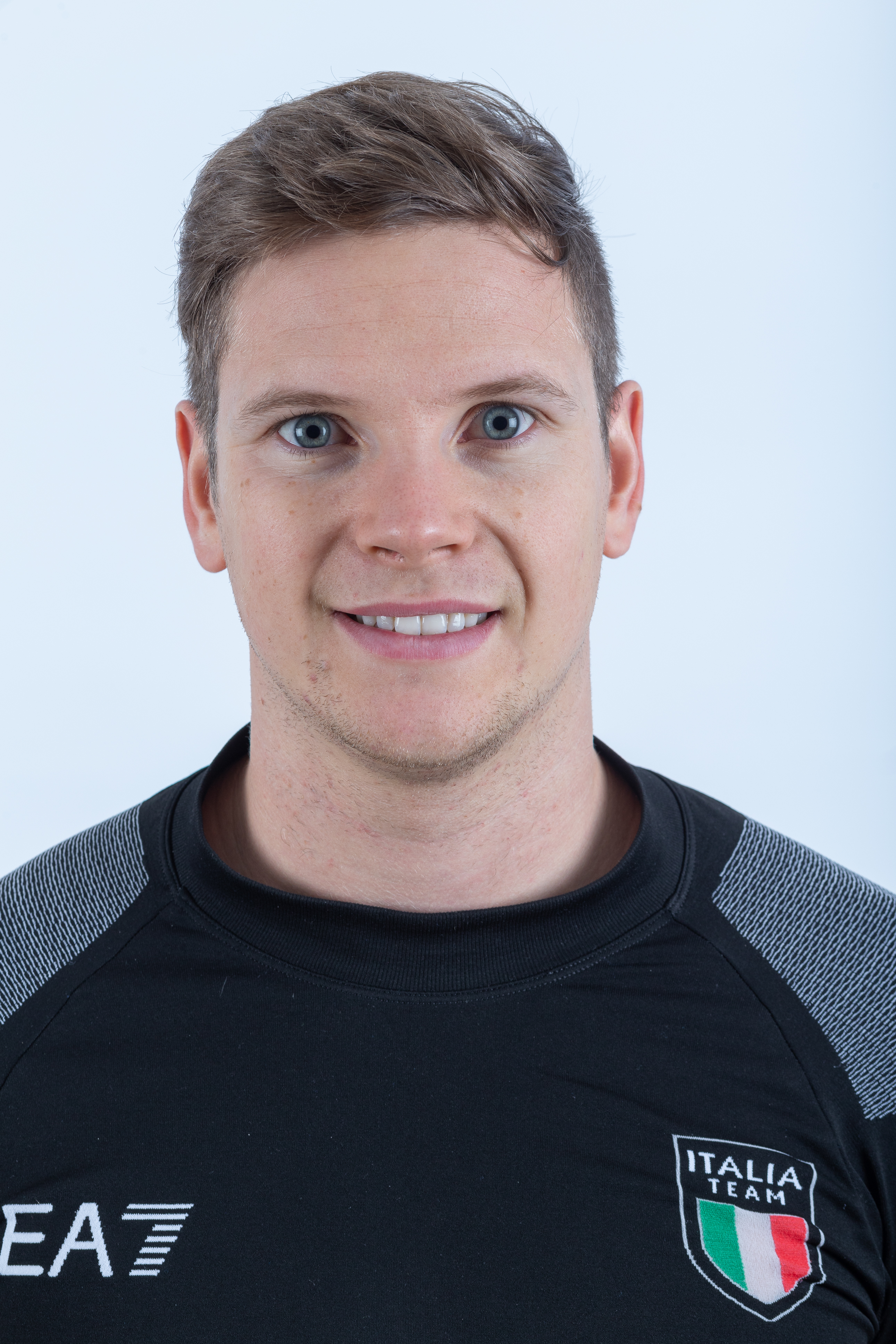
- Fischnaller in 2018

Personal information
- Nationality: Italian
- Born: 2 December 1993 (age 31); Brixen, Italy

Sport
- Sport: Luge

Kevin Fischnaller (born 2 December 1993 in Brixen, Italy) is an Italian luge athlete who has competed in the Luge World Cup for Italy since 2011.

During the 2014-15 Luge World Cup he won a bronze at Iglis in the men's spirit event. On 25 November 2017, during the 2017-18 Luge World Cup season, Fischnaller won his first world cup race, taking the gold at Winterberg. He placed ninth in the 2017 FIL World Luge Championships – Men's sprint event. Fischnaller competed for Italy in the Men's singles luge event at the 2018 Winter Olympics in Pyeongchang. He came seventh, while his cousin Dominik came fourth.

== Personal life ==
Kevin is the cousin of the Italian lugers Dominik Fischnaller and Hans Peter Fischnaller.
