= 2015 FIL World Luge Championships – Men's singles =

Men's singles at the 2015 FIL World Luge Championships
- Venue: Sigulda bobsleigh, luge, and skeleton track, Sigulda
- Date: 15 February 2015
- Competitors: 37 from 17 nations
- Winning time: 1:36.288

Medalists
gold medal	Semen Pavlichenko	Russia
silver medal	Felix Loch	Germany
bronze medal	Wolfgang Kindl	Austria

2015 FIL World Luge Championships
Individual	men		women
Doubles	doubles
Relay		mixed

The Men's singles race of the 2015 FIL World Luge Championships was held on 15 February 2015.

== Results ==
The first run was started at 10:14 and the second run at 12:12.

Rank	Bib	Name	Country	Run 1	Rank	Run 2	Rank	Total	Diff
1st place, gold medalist(s)	2	Semen Pavlichenko	Russia	48.137	1	48.151	1	1:36.288	
2nd place, silver medalist(s)	1	Felix Loch	Germany	48.173	3	48.186	2	1:36.359	+0.071
3rd place, bronze medalist(s)	7	Wolfgang Kindl	Austria	48.265	6	48.207	3	1:36.472	+0.184
4	8	Aleksander Peretyagin	Russia	48.186	4	48.306	5	1:36.492	+0.204
5	6	Andi Langenhan	Germany	48.227	5	48.317	6	1:36.544	+0.256
6	5	Chris Mazdzer	United States	48.584	13	48.216	4	1:36.800	+0.512
7	4	Stepan Fedorov	Russia	48.312	8	48.532	9	1:36.833	+0.556
8	15	Johannes Ludwig	Germany	48.267	7	48.653	12	1:36.920	+0.632
9	3	Julian von Schleinitz	Germany	48.657	16	48.394	7	1:37.051	+0.763
10	17	Riks Rozītis	Latvia	48.489	10	48.635	11	1:37.124	+0.836
11	9	Evgeniy Voskresenskiy	Russia	48.607	15	48.539	10	1:37.146	+0.858
12	18	Inārs Kivlenieks	Latvia	48.597	14	48.694	14	1:37.291	+1.003
13	10	Dominik Fischnaller	Italy	48.157	2	49.201	22	1:37.358	+1.070
14	21	Jozef Ninis	Slovakia	48.541	11	48.828	17	1:37.369	+1.081
15	22	Artūrs Dārznieks	Latvia	48.988	22	48.446	8	1:37.434	+1.146
16	20	Maciej Kurowski	Poland	48.787	19	48.690	13	1:37.477	+1.189
17	11	Samuel Edney	Canada	48.581	12	49.016	21	1:37.597	+1.309
18	16	Tucker West	United States	48.827	20	48.804	16	1:37.631	+1.343
19	23	Thor Haug Nørbech	Norway	48.707	17	48.927	19	1:37.634	+1.346
20	25	Jo Alexander Koppang	Norway	48.885	21	48.930	20	1:37.815	+1.527
21	28	Ondřej Hyman	Czech Republic	49.209	23	48.788	15	1:37.997	+1.709
22	14	David Gleirscher	Austria	48.478	9	49.578	24	1:38.056	+1.768
23	24	Valentin Creţu	Romania	49.257	25	48.875	18	1:38.132	+1.844
24	27	Wojciech Chmielewski	Poland	49.209	23	49.298	23	1:38.507	+2.219
25	31	Kristers Aparjods	Latvia	49.264	26				
26	12	Reinhard Egger	Austria	49.350	27				
27	35	Kim Dong-hyeon	South Korea	49.442	28				
28	26	Andriy Mandziy	Ukraine	49.486	29				
29	29	Marek Solčanský	Slovakia	49.746	30				
30	19	Daniel Pfister	Austria	49.815	31				
31	32	Pavel Angelov	Bulgaria	50.109	32				
32	36	Stanislav Benyov	Bulgaria	50.169	33				
33	34	Daniel Popa	Romania	50.231	34				
34	33	Adam Rosen	Great Britain	51.013	35				
35	37	Shiva Keshavan	India	51.015	36				
	13	Kevin Fischnaller	Italy	48.786	18	DNF			
	30	Anton Dukach	Ukraine	DNF					
