= 2016 FIL World Luge Championships – Men's sprint =

Men's sprint at the 2016 FIL World Luge Championships
- Venue: Königssee bobsleigh, luge, and skeleton track, Königssee
- Date: 29 January
- Competitors: 41 from 17 nations
- Winning time: 38.574

Medalists
gold medal	Felix Loch	Germany
silver medal	Andi Langenhan	Germany
bronze medal	Ralf Palik	Germany

The Men's sprint race of the 2016 FIL World Luge Championships was held on 29 January 2016.

== Results ==
The qualification run was started at 11:15 and the final run at 16:01.

Rank	Bib	Name	Country	Qualification	Rank	Final	Rank	Diff
1st place, gold medalist(s)	15	Felix Loch	Germany	38.704	1	38.574	1	
2nd place, silver medalist(s)	12	Andi Langenhan	Germany	38.718	2	38.794	2	+0.220
3rd place, bronze medalist(s)	11	Ralf Palik	Germany	38.797	4	38.808	3	+0.234
4	13	Chris Mazdzer	United States	38.991	11	38.876	4	+0.302
5	14	Wolfgang Kindl	Austria	38.847	7	38.902	5	+0.328
6	8	Johannes Ludwig	Germany	38.854	8	38.934	6	+0.360
7	5	Armin Frauscher	Austria	38.743	3	38.940	7	+0.366
8	1	Mitchel Malyk	Canada	38.803	5	39.026	8	+0.452
9	6	David Gleirscher	Austria	38.812	6	39.077	9	+0.503
10	27	Stepan Fedorov	Russia	38.983	10	39.101	10	+0.527
11	19	Riks Rozītis	Latvia	39.018	13	39.107	11	+0.533
12	4	Semen Pavlichenko	Russia	38.911	9	39.141	12	+0.567
13	7	Roman Repilov	Russia	39.041	14	39.383	13	+0.809
14	3	Inārs Kivlenieks	Latvia	39.002	12	39.415	14	+0.841
15	10	Tucker West	United States	39.100	15	39.587	15	+1.013
16	21	Artūrs Dārznieks	Latvia	39.111	16			
17	22	Emanuel Rieder	Italy	39.141	17			
18	20	Valentin Creţu	Romania	39.151	18			
19	17	Kevin Fischnaller	Italy	39.193	19			
20	16	Jozef Ninis	Slovakia	39.232	20			
21	9	Dominik Fischnaller	Italy	39.235	21			
22	32	Maciej Kurowski	Poland	39.269	22			
23	25	Reinhard Egger	Austria	39.270	23			
24	2	Aidan Kelly	United States	39.284	24			
25	23	Ondřej Hyman	Czech Republic	39.285	25			
26	26	Maksim Aravin	Russia	39.386	26			
27	31	Wojciech Chmielewski	Poland	39.390	27			
28	28	Anton Dukach	Ukraine	39.404	28			
29	24	Kristaps Mauriņš	Latvia	39.552	29			
30	29	Hidenari Kanayama	Japan	39.570	30			
31	34	Theo Gruber	Italy	39.713	31			
31	18	Taylor Morris	United States	39.713	31			
33	36	Andriy Mandziy	Ukraine	39.755	33			
34	30	Alexander Ferlazzo	Australia	40.055	34			
35	39	Kang Doung-kyu	South Korea	40.203	35			
36	37	Reid Watts	Canada	40.325	36			
37	43	Rupert Staudinger	Great Britain	40.453	37			
38	41	Lim Nam-kyu	South Korea	40.704	38			
39	35	Pavel Angelov	Bulgaria	41.011	39			
40	33	Daniel Popa	Romania	41.225	40			
41	40	Kim Dong-hyeon	South Korea	41.406	41			
