= FIL World Luge Championships 2011 =

The FIL World Luge Championships 2011 took place 28–30 January 2011 in Cesana, Italy at the Cesana Pariol bobsleigh, luge, and skeleton track. A total of 19 countries competed.

== Medalists ==
Event	Gold	Silver	Bronze
Men's singles	Armin Zöggeler; Italy	Felix Loch; Germany	Andi Langenhan; Germany
Women's singles	Tatjana Hüfner; Germany	Natalie Geisenberger; Germany	Alex Gough; Canada
Doubles	Austria; Andreas Linger; Wolfgang Linger	Italy; Christian Oberstolz; Patrick Gruber	Latvia; Andris Šics; Juris Šics
Team relay	Cancelled		

== Men's singles ==
Germany's Felix Loch is the defending Olympic and world champion in this event. The event took place on 29 January at 15:00 CET. Zöggeler came from 0.057 seconds down after the first run to defeat defending world champion Loch by 0.021 seconds. It was the Italian's sixth world championship overall, but his first since the 2005 championships in Park City, Utah in the United States where Zöggeler won his 2002 Olympic gold medal.

37 athletes from 18 countries competed.

Rank	Bib	Athlete	Country	Run 1	Run 2	Total	Behind
1st place, gold medalist(s)	6	Armin Zöggeler	Italy	51.568	51.970	1:43.538	
2nd place, silver medalist(s)	1	Felix Loch	Germany	51.511	52.048	1:43.559	+0.021
3rd place, bronze medalist(s)	4	Andi Langenhan	Germany	51.827	52.186	1:44.013	+0.475
4	3	David Möller	Germany	51.803	52.318	1:44.121	+0.583
5	2	Reinhold Rainer	Italy	52.036	52.135	1:44.171	+0.633
6	11	Daniel Pfister	Austria	51.957	52.219	1:44.176	+0.638
7	7	Jan-Armin Eichhorn	Germany	51.940	52.284	1:44.224	+0.686
8	9	Wolfgang Kindl	Austria	52.026	52.241	1:44.267	+0.729
9	12	Viktor Kneyb	Russia	52.245	52.200	1:44.445	+0.907
10	16	Mārtiņš Rubenis	Latvia	52.160	52.322	1:44.482	+0.944
11	8	Reinhard Egger	Austria	52.227	52.403	1:44.630	+1.092
12	15	David Mair	Italy	52.278	52.362	1:44.640	+1.102
12	19	Bengt Walden	United States	52.335	52.305	1:44.640	+1.102
14	22	Manuel Pfister	Austria	52.279	52.417	1:44.696	+1.158
15	14	Gregory Carigiet	Switzerland	52.241	52.486	1:44.727	+1.189
16	13	Samuel Edney	Canada	52.329	52.414	1:44.743	+1.205
17	20	Jozef Ninis	Slovakia	52.324	52.421	1:44.745	+1.207
18	10	Jeff Christie	Canada	52.341	52.461	1:44.802	+1.264
19	23	Maciej Kurowski	Poland	52.436	52.383	1:44.819	+1.281
20	18	Evgeniy Voskresenskiy	Russia	52.323	52.611	1:44.934	+1.396
21	21	Inars Kivlenieks	Latvia	52.551	52.398	1:44.949	+1.411
22	26	Brendan Hauptmann	Canada	52.562	52.419	1:44.981	+1.443
23	29	Chris Mazdzer	United States	52.515	52.563	1:45.078	+1.540
24	17	Thor Haug Norbech	Norway	52.330	53.233	1:45.563	+2.025
25	27	Semen Pavlichenko	Russia	52.460	53.162	1:45.622	+2.084
26	24	Jo Alexander Koppang	Norway	52.631			
27	30	Andriy Mandziy	Ukraine	52.905			
28	25	Tonnes Stang Rolfsen	Norway	52.907			
29	28	Ondrej Hymann	Czech Republic	53.128			
30	37	Valentin Cretu	Romania	53.187			
31	31	Andriy Kis	Ukraine	53.202			
32	5	Albert Demchenko	Russia	53.325			
33	32	Bogdan Macovei	Moldova	53.425			
34	34	Karol Stuchlak	Slovakia	54.142			
35	33	Hindenari Kanayama	Japan	54.154			
36	35	Bruno Banani	Tonga	55.698			
37	36	Danej Navrboc	Slovenia	56.740			

== Women's singles ==
Erin Hamlin of the United States in the defending world champion while Germany's Tatjana Hüfner in the defending Olympic champion. The event took place on 29 January at 08:20 CET.

26 athletes from 13 countries competed.

Hüfner rebounded from her disappointing finish at the 2009 championships with her third gold medal in this event. Defending champion Hamlin finished 14th. Geisenberger won her third straight silver in this event. Gough becomes the first Canadian woman to medal at the World Championships and the second Canadian overall after Miroslav Zajonc's gold in the men's singles event at the 1983 championships.

Rank	Bib	Athlete	Country	Run 1	Run 2	Total	Behind
1st place, gold medalist(s)	1	Tatjana Hüfner	Germany	46.976	46.993	1:33.969	
2nd place, silver medalist(s)	8	Natalie Geisenberger	Germany	47.027	47.216	1:34.243	+0.274
3rd place, bronze medalist(s)	10	Alex Gough	Canada	47.051	47.362	1:34.413	+0.444
4	4	Nina Reithmayer	Austria	47.174	47.296	1:34.470	+0.501
5	2	Anke Wischnewski	Germany	47.328	47.263	1:34.591	+0.622
6	7	Carina Schwab	Germany	47.227	47.431	1:34.658	+0.689
7	3	Veronika Halder	Austria	47.374	47.573	1:34.947	+0.978
8	9	Martina Kocher	Switzerland	47.475	47.539	1:35.014	+1.045
9	13	Alexandra Rodionova	Russia	47.472	47.569	1:35.041	+1.072
10	6	Sandra Gasparini	Italy	47.461	47.670	1:35.131	+1.162
11	5	Tatiana Ivanova	Russia	47.532	47.714	1:35.246	+1.277
12	17	Julia Clukey	United States	47.667	47.730	1:35.397	+1.428
13	12	Arianne Jones	Canada	47.773	47.775	1:35.548	+1.579
14	11	Erin Hamlin	United States	48.234	47.326	1:35.560	+1.591
15	16	Veronika Sabolova	Slovakia	47.900	47.934	1:35.834	+1.865
16	15	Ksenia Tsyplakova	Russia	47.760	48.134	1:35.894	+1.925
17	19	Ashley Walden	United States	48.162	48.003	1:36.165	+2.196
18	20	Raluca Stramaturaru	Romania	48.540	48.325	1:36.865	+2.896
19	14	Maija Tiruma	Latvia	47.764	49.415	1:37.179	+3.210
20	24	Violeta Stramaturaru	Romania	48.954	48.857	1:37.811	+3.842
21	26	Morgane Villien	France	49.303			
22	21	Maryna Halaydzhyan	Ukraine	49.316			
23	23	Natalia Khoreva	Russia	50.572			
24	25	Mihaela Chiras	Romania	51.153			
	22	Morgane Bonnefoy	France	DNF			
	18	Ewelina Staszulonek	Poland	DSQ			

== Men's doubles ==
Italy's Gerhard Plankensteiner and Oswald Haselrieder are the defending world champions. Austria's Andreas and Wolfgang Linger are the two-time defending Olympic champions. Plankensteiner and Haselrieder retired between the 2010 Winter Olympics and the start of the 2010-11 Luge World Cup. The first run of the event will take place on 29 January at 19:00 CET while the second run will take place at 09:00 CET the next day.

Rank	Bib	Athlete	Country	Run 1	Run 2	Total	Behind
1st place, gold medalist(s)	6	Andreas Linger; Wolfgang Linger	Austria	46.668	46.612	1:33.280	
2nd place, silver medalist(s)	10	Christian Oberstolz; Patrick Gruber	Italy	46.752	46.760	1:33.512	+0.232
3rd place, bronze medalist(s)	7	Andris Šics; Juris Šics	Latvia	46.909	46.819	1:33.728	+0.448
4	3	Vladislav Yuzhakov; Vladimir Makhnutin	Russia	46.919	46.820	1:33.739	+0.459
5	11	Ludwig Rieder; Patrick Rastner	Italy	47.041	47.017	1:34.058	+0.778
6	2	Hans Peter Fischnaller; Patrick Schwienbacher	Italy	47.017	47.054	1:34.071	+0.791
7	16	Matthew Mortensen; Preston Griffall	United States	47.055	47.072	1:34.127	+0.847
8	14	Tristan Walker; Justin Snith	Canada	47.163	46.983	1:34.146	+0.866
9	12	Ronny Pietrasik; Christian Weise	Germany	47.145	47.006	1:34.151	+0.871
10	4	Toni Eggert; Sascha Benecken	Germany	47.199	46.994	1:34.193	+0.913
11	1	Christian Niccum; Jayson Terdiman	United States	46.955	47.253	1:34.208	+0.928
12	5	Mikhail Kuzmich; Stanislav Mikheev	Russia	47.167	47.149	1:34.316	+1.036
13	13	Ivan Nevmerzhitski; Vladimir Prokhorov	Russia	47.081	47.307	1:34.388	+1.108
14	8	Peter Penz; Georg Fischler	Austria	46.757	47.917	1:34.674	+1.394
15	18	Ján Harniš; Branislav Regec	Slovakia	47.504	47.299	1:34.803	+1.523
16	15	Antonín Brož; Lukáš Brož	Czech Republic	47.470	47.343	1:34.813	+1.533
17	17	Paul Ifrim; Andrei Anghel	Romania	47.603	48.426	1:36.029	+2.749
18	20	Arthur Petyniak; Adam Wanielista	Poland	48.237			
19	19	Cosmin Chetroiu; Ionuţ Ţăran	Romania	48.250			
	9	Tobias Wendl; Tobias Arlt	Germany	47.866			

== Mixed team relay ==
The German team of Loch, Natalie Geisenberger, André Florschütz, and Torsten Wustlich were the defending world champions. The event was to have taken place on 30 January at 10:20 CET, but was cancelled due to technical problems.

== Medal table ==
Rank	Nation	Gold	Silver	Bronze	Total
1	Germany (GER)	1	2	1	4
2	Italy (ITA)	1	1	0	2
3	Austria (AUT)	1	0	0	1
4	Canada (CAN)	0	0	1	1
4	Latvia (LAT)	0	0	1	1
Totals (5 entries)		3	3	3	9
