= Luge at the 2014 Winter Olympics – Men's singles =

Men's singles at the XXII Olympic Winter Games
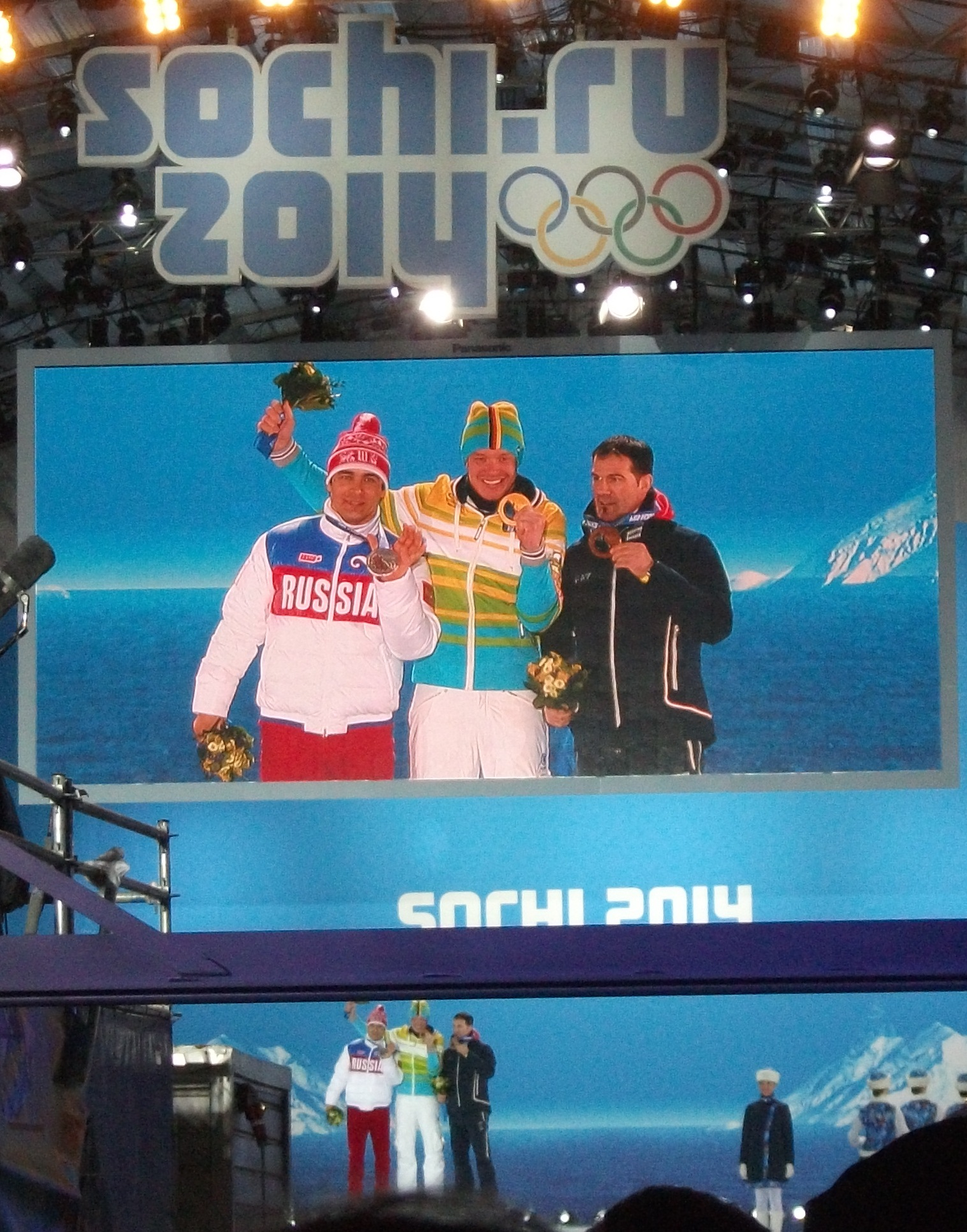
- Medalists
- Venue: Sliding Center Sanki
- Dates: 8–9 February 2014
- Competitors: 39 from 22 nations
- Winning time: 3:27.526

Medalists
1st place, gold medalist(s)		Felix Loch	Germany
2nd place, silver medalist(s)		Albert Demchenko	Russia
3rd place, bronze medalist(s)		Armin Zöggeler	Italy

The men's luge at the 2014 Winter Olympics was held between 8–9 February 2014 at the Sliding Center Sanki in Rzhanaya Polyana, Russia. Germany's Felix Loch was the two-time defending world champion and won the gold medal with the fastest time in two of the four runs. The test event that took place at the venue was won by Germany's Andi Langenhan. Loch was also the defending Olympic champion.

On December 22, 2017 Albert Demchenko of Russia was banned for doping violations and his silver medal was stripped. On 1 February 2018, his results were restored as a result of the successful appeal.

== Qualifying athletes ==
The top 38, with each nation allowed a maximum of 3, after five of five races. India and South Korea (the next two unrepresented nations) get the additional quota spots, as no nations were able to use them to complete a relay. Slovenia and Great Britain rejected their quota spots. The next three nations in the rankings (Bulgaria, Netherlands and Chinese Taipei) received the quotas. Netherlands rejected their quota, and as the last country with meeting qualification standard, this meant only 39 athletes would compete.

- Alexander Ferlazzo (AUS)
- Reinhard Egger (AUT)
- Wolfgang Kindl (AUT)
- Daniel Pfister (AUT)
- Stanislav Benyov (BUL)
- Samuel Edney (CAN)
- John Fennell (CAN)
- Mitchel Malyk (CAN)
- Ondřej Hyman (CZE)
- Andi Langenhan (GER)
- Felix Loch (GER)
- David Möller (GER)
- Shiva Keshavan (IOP)^{[Note]}
- Dominik Fischnaller (ITA)
- Emanuel Rieder (ITA)
- Armin Zoeggeler (ITA)
- Hidenari Kanayama (JPN)
- Kim Dong-hyeon (KOR)
- Inars Kivlenieks (LAT)
- Kristaps Maurins (LAT)
- Martins Rubenis (LAT)
- Bogdan Macovei (MDA)
- Jo Alexander Koppang (NOR)
- Thor Haug Norbech (NOR)
- Tønnes Stang Rolfsen (NOR)
- Maciej Kurowski (POL)
- Valentin Crețu (ROU)
- Albert Demchenko (RUS)
- Semen Pavlichenko (RUS)
- Aleksander Peretyagin (RUS)
- Gregory Carigiet (SUI)
- Jozef Ninis (SVK)
- Bruno Banani (TGA)
- Lien Te-An (TPE)
- Andriy Kis (UKR)
- Andriy Mandziy (UKR)
- Aidan Kelly (USA)
- Chris Mazdzer (USA)
- Tucker West (USA)

== Competition schedule ==
All times are (UTC+4).

Date	Time	Event
8 February	18:30	Run 1
8 February	20:30	Run 2
9 February	18:30	Run 3
9 February	20:30	Run 4

== Results ==
Four runs, split over two days, were used to determine the winner.

Rank	Bib	Athlete	Country	Run 1	Rank	Run 2	Rank	Run 3	Rank	Run 4	Rank	Total	Behind
1st place, gold medalist(s)	10	Felix Loch	Germany	52.185	2	51.964	1	51.613	1	51.764	1	3:27.526	—
2nd place, silver medalist(s)	7	Albert Demchenko	Russia	52.170	1	52.273	2	51.707	2	51.852	2	3:28.002	+0.476
3rd place, bronze medalist(s)	9	Armin Zöggeler	Italy	52.506	3	52.387	3	51.910	3	51.994	3	3:28.797	+1.271
4	12	Andi Langenhan	Germany	52.707	8	52.480	4	52.073	7	52.095	4	3:29.355	+1.829
5	8	Semen Pavlichenko	Russia	52.660	6	52.593	10	51.928	4	52.255	14	3:29.436	+1.910
6	1	Dominik Fischnaller	Italy	52.729	9	52.540	5	52.007	5	52.203	11	3:29.479	+1.953
7	16	Aleksander Peretyagin	Russia	52.675	7	52.590	9	52.069	6	52.161	7	3:29.495	+1.969
8	3	Reinhard Egger	Austria	52.564	4	52.630	11	52.152	9	52.160	6	3:29.506	+1.980
9	2	Wolfgang Kindl	Austria	52.586	5	52.714	13	52.145	8	52.218	12	3:29.663	+2.137
10	6	Mārtiņš Rubenis	Latvia	52.775	11	52.560	7	52.229	10	52.133	5	3:29.697	+2.171
11	11	Samuel Edney	Canada	52.783	14	52.546	6	52.268	11	52.180	9	3:29.777	+2.251
12	14	Gregory Carigiet	Switzerland	52.775	11	52.579	8	52.274	12	52.167	8	3:29.795	+2.269
13	4	Chris Mazdzer	United States	52.744	10	52.643	12	52.369	17	52.198	10	3:29.954	+2.428
14	5	David Möller	Germany	52.781	13	52.865	16	52.312	14	52.281	15	3:30.239	+2.713
15	18	Daniel Pfister	Austria	52.925	16	52.802	14	52.306	13	52.243	13	3:30.276	+2.750
16	19	Inārs Kivlenieks	Latvia	52.872	15	52.927	20	52.347	16	52.379	17	3:30.525	+2.999
17	15	Thor Haug Nørbech	Norway	53.014	18	52.859	15	52.345	15	52.347	16	3:30.565	+3.039
18	22	Tønnes Stang Rolfsen	Norway	53.043	20	52.938	22	52.463	19	52.466	18	3:30.910	+3.384
19	23	Emanuel Rieder	Italy	52.981	17	52.875	17	52.578	22	52.511	19	3:30.945	+3.419
20	13	Jozef Ninis	Slovakia	53.143	22	52.932	21	52.492	20	52.564	21	3:31.131	+3.605
21	17	Kristaps Maurins	Latvia	53.144	23	52.923	19	52.518	21	52.630	23	3:31.215	+3.689
22	25	Tucker West	United States	53.142	21	52.966	23	52.413	18	52.696	25	3:31.217	+3.691
23	24	Maciej Kurowski	Poland	53.234	25	52.988	24	52.637	23	52.538	20	3:31.397	+3.871
24	27	Aidan Kelly	United States	53.275	26	53.192	26	52.756	24	52.576	22	3:31.799	+4.273
25	20	Ondřej Hyman	Czech Republic	53.222	24	53.145	25	52.783	26	52.708	26	3:31.858	+4.332
26	33	Mitchel Malyk	Canada	53.367	28	53.401	29	52.756	24	52.633	24	3:32.157	+4.631
27	32	John Fennell	Canada	53.350	27	53.561	30	52.879	27	52.926	29	3:32.716	+5.190
28	28	Andriy Kis	Ukraine	53.533	30	53.358	28	53.046	29	52.859	28	3:32.796	+5.270
29	35	Valentin Creţu	Romania	53.562	31	53.297	27	52.902	28	53.142	32	3:32.885	+5.359
30	31	Hidenari Kanayama	Japan	53.626	32	53.663	33	53.220	31	53.074	31	3:33.583	+6.057
31	36	Andriy Mandziy	Ukraine	53.653	33	53.660	32	53.227	32	53.062	30	3:33.602	+6.076
32	30	Bruno Banani	Tonga	53.656	34	53.637	31	53.162	30	53.221	33	3:33.676	+6.150
33	26	Alexander Ferlazzo	Australia	53.528	29	53.686	34	53.323	33	53.507	35	3:34.044	+6.518
34	21	Jo Alexander Koppang	Norway	53.028	19	52.894	18	57.080	39	52.790	27	3:35.792	+8.266
35	37	Kim Dong-hyeon	South Korea	54.207	36	54.603	36	53.795	34	53.780	37	3:36.385	+8.859
36	29	Bogdan Macovei	Moldova	54.591	37	54.271	35	53.925	35	53.779	36	3:36.566	+9.040
37	38	Shiva Keshavan	Independent Olympic Participants^{[Note]}	53.905	35	55.203	38	54.706	37	53.335	34	3:37.149	+9.623
38	34	Stanislav Benyov	Bulgaria	55.040	38	55.006	37	54.558	36	54.476	38	3:39.080	+11.554
39	39	Lien Te-an	Chinese Taipei	62.961	39	55.315	39	55.287	38	54.528	39	3:48.091	+20.565
