= Latvia at the 2014 Winter Olympics =

- IOC code: LAT
- NOC: Latvian Olympic Committee
- Website: www.olimpiade.lv (in Latvian and English)

in Sochi
- Competitors: 58 in 9 sports
- Flag bearers: Sandis Ozoliņš (opening); Daumants Dreiškens (closing)
- Medals Ranked 19th: Gold 1 Silver 1 Bronze 3 Total 5

Winter Olympics appearances (overview)
- 1924; 1928; 1932; 1936; 1948–1988; 1992; 1994; 1998; 2002; 2006; 2010; 2014; 2018; 2022; 2026

Other related appearances
- Soviet Union (1956–1988)

Latvia competed at the 2014 Winter Olympics in Sochi, Russia, from 7 to 23 February 2014. The Latvian team consisted of 58 athletes in nine sports. These were the third consecutive games the country qualified to send 58 athletes.

Ice hockey player Vitalijs Pavlovs tested positive for methylhexaneamine and was thrown out of the Olympics.

Latvia originally won two silver medals and two bronze medals. In November 2017, the Russian Bobsleigh teams that came first and fourth in the four-man event, was disqualified. In addition, the Russian Bobsleigh teams that came first and fourth in the two-man event, was also disqualified. This meant Latvia moved from the original 5th place to the bronze medal position in the two-man event and from the original silver medal to the gold medal position in the four-man event respectively. The IOC requested that the FIBT modify the results, and the medals were redistributed accordingly. Also, the gold medal in the four-man Bobsleigh event is Latvia's first Winter Olympic gold medal.

== Medalists ==
Medal	Name	Sport	Event	Date
Gold	Oskars Melbārdis; Arvis Vilkaste; Daumants Dreiškens; Jānis Strenga	Bobsleigh	Four-man	23 February
Silver	Martins Dukurs	Skeleton	Men's	15 February
Bronze	Andris Šics; Juris Šics	Luge	Men's doubles	12 February
Bronze	Mārtiņš Rubenis; Elīza Tīruma; Andris Šics; Juris Šics	Luge	Mixed team relay	13 February
Bronze	Daumants Dreiškens; Oskars Melbārdis	Bobsleigh	Two-man	17 February

== Alpine skiing ==
According to the final quota allocation released on 20 January 2014, Latvia had five athletes in qualification position.

Athlete	Event	Run 1		Run 2		Total	
Athlete	Event	Time	Rank	Time	Rank	Time	Rank
Mārtiņš Onskulis	Men's giant slalom	DNF					
Mārtiņš Onskulis	Men's slalom	56.16	61	1:01.44	24	1:57.60	27
Roberts Rode	Men's downhill	—N/a				2:17.50	47
Roberts Rode	Men's slalom	DNF					
Roberts Rode	Men's super-G	—N/a				DNF	
Kristaps Zvejnieks	Men's giant slalom	1:27.80	47	1:29.50	46	2:57.30	43
Kristaps Zvejnieks	Men's slalom	DNF					
Agnese Āboltiņa	Women's giant slalom	1:31.85	61	DNF			
Agnese Āboltiņa	Women's slalom	1:05.44	49	1:01.18	35	2:06.62	37
Agnese Āboltiņa	Women's super-G	—N/a				1:36.10	31
Lelde Gasūna	Women's giant slalom	DNF					
Lelde Gasūna	Women's slalom	1:00.47	37	56.82	30	1:57.29	30

== Biathlon ==
Based on their performance at the 2012 and 2013 Biathlon World Championships, Latvia qualified 1 man and 1 woman.

Athlete	Event	Time	Misses	Rank
Andrejs Rastorgujevs	Men's sprint	25:20.2	1 (1+0)	17
Andrejs Rastorgujevs	Men's pursuit	34:36.9	1 (0+0+1+0)	9
Andrejs Rastorgujevs	Men's individual	53:18.9	3 (0+1+0+2)	33
Andrejs Rastorgujevs	Men's mass start	43:53.1	3 (0+1+1+1)	14
Žanna Juškāne	Women's sprint	25:36.5	6 (2+4)	79
Žanna Juškāne	Women's individual	DNF	6 (2+2+2)	DNF

== Bobsleigh ==
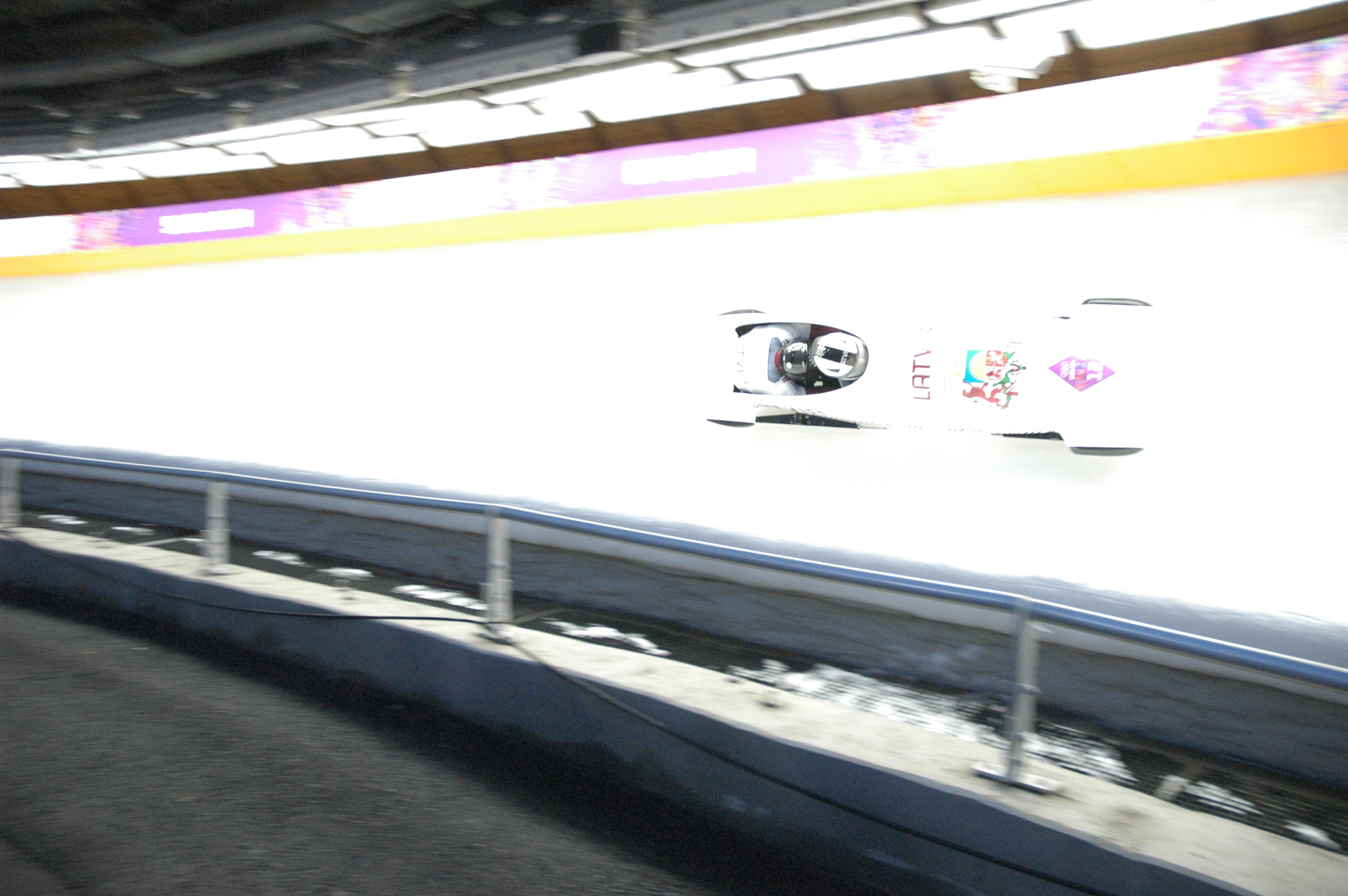
Latvian two-man sled

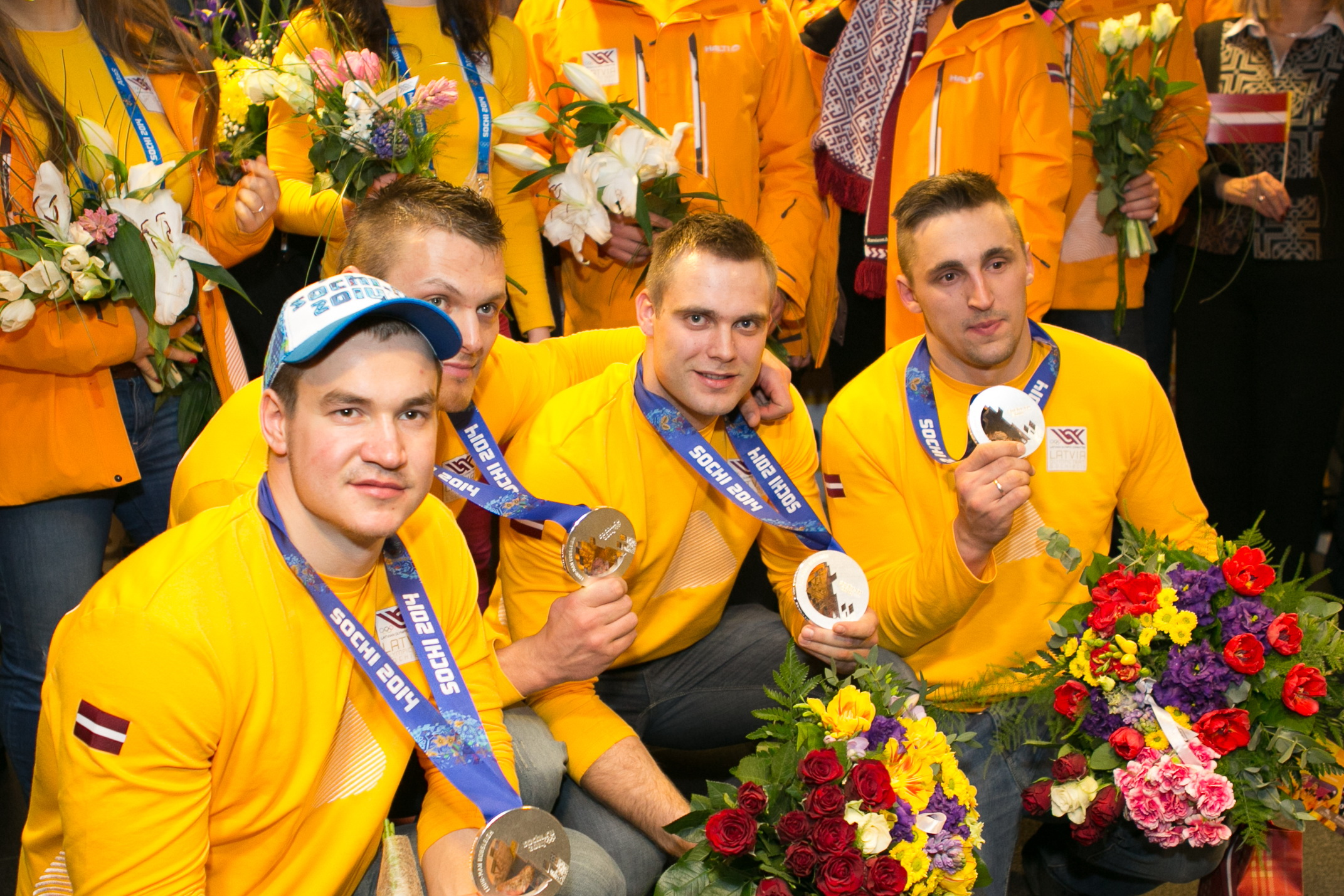
Latvians took home the gold medal in four-man bobsleigh.

The team consisted of the following athletes:

Athlete	Event	Run 1		Run 2		Run 3		Run 4		Total	
Athlete	Event	Time	Rank	Time	Rank	Time	Rank	Time	Rank	Time	Rank
Daumants Dreiškens; Oskars Melbārdis*	Two-man	56.62 SR	8	56.68	=3	56.43	5	56.75	8	3:46.48	3rd place, bronze medalist(s)
Oskars Ķibermanis*; Vairis Leiboms	Two-man	57.11	15	57.22	19	57.00	15	57.19	19	3:48.52	16
Raivis Broks; Oskars Ķibermanis*; Vairis Leiboms; Helvijs Lūsis	Four-man	55.68	15	55.52	13	55.97	=17	55.81	16	3:42.98	14
Daumants Dreiškens; Oskars Melbārdis*; Jānis Strenga; Arvis Vilkaste	Four-man	55.10	5	55.13	1	55.15	2	55.31	3	3:40.69	1st place, gold medalist(s)

* – Denotes the driver of each sled

== Cross-country skiing ==
According to the final quota allocation released on 20 January 2014, Latvia had three athletes in qualification position.

Distance

Athlete	Event	Classical		Freestyle		Final		
Athlete	Event	Time	Rank	Time	Rank	Time	Deficit	Rank
Arvis Liepiņš	Men's 15 km classical	—N/a				45:36.2	+7:06.5	73
Arvis Liepiņš	Men's 30 km skiathlon	40:44.1	64	38:39.9	66	1:20:00.1	+11:44.7	66
Arvis Liepiņš	Men's 50 km freestyle	—N/a				2:04:45.6	+17:50.4	59
Jānis Paipals	Men's 15 km classical	—N/a				DNF		
Inga Dauškāne	Women's 10 km classical	—N/a				36:13.1	+7:55.3	62

Sprint

Athlete	Event	Qualification		Quarterfinal		Semifinal		Final	
Athlete	Event	Time	Rank	Time	Rank	Time	Rank	Time	Rank
Arvis Liepiņš	Men's sprint	3:49.28	61	Did not advance					
Jānis Paipals	Men's sprint	3:56.21	71	Did not advance					
Inga Dauškāne	Women's sprint	2:53.90	59	Did not advance					

== Ice hockey ==
Latvia qualified a men's team by winning a qualification tournament.

The following is the Latvian roster in the men's ice hockey tournament of the 2014 Winter Olympics.

No.	Pos.	Name	Height	Weight	Birthdate	Birthplace	2013–14 team
1	G	Ervīns Muštukovs	184 cm (6 ft 0 in)	85 kg (187 lb)	7 April 1984	Rīga	(Denmark) EfB Ishockey (DEN)
3	F	Juris Štāls	191 cm (6 ft 3 in)	94 kg (207 lb)	8 April 1982	Rīga	(Slovakia) HK Poprad (SVK)
5	F	Jānis Sprukts	190 cm (6 ft 3 in)	102 kg (225 lb)	31 January 1982	Rīga	(Russia) Lokomotiv Yaroslavl (KHL)
6	D	Arvīds Reķis	180 cm (5 ft 11 in)	90 kg (200 lb)	1 January 1979	Jūrmala	(Latvia) Dinamo Riga (KHL)
8	D	Sandis Ozoliņš – C	190 cm (6 ft 3 in)	97 kg (214 lb)	3 August 1972	Sigulda	(Latvia) Dinamo Riga (KHL)
9	D	Krišjānis Rēdlihs	189 cm (6 ft 2 in)	93 kg (205 lb)	15 January 1981	Rīga	(Latvia) Dinamo Riga (KHL)
10	F	Lauris Dārziņš – A	191 cm (6 ft 3 in)	91 kg (201 lb)	28 January 1985	Rīga	(Latvia) Dinamo Riga (KHL)
11	D	Kristaps Sotnieks	184 cm (6 ft 0 in)	87 kg (192 lb)	29 January 1987	Rīga	(Latvia) Dinamo Riga (KHL)
12	F	Herberts Vasiļjevs	180 cm (5 ft 11 in)	84 kg (185 lb)	23 May 1976	Rīga	(Germany) Krefeld Pinguine (DEL)
15	F	Mārtiņš Karsums	177 cm (5 ft 10 in)	88 kg (194 lb)	26 February 1986	Rīga	(Russia) Dynamo Moscow (KHL)
16	F	Kaspars Daugaviņš	185 cm (6 ft 1 in)	93 kg (205 lb)	18 May 1988	Rīga	(Switzerland) HC Geneve-Servette (NLA)
21	F	Armands Bērziņš	192 cm (6 ft 4 in)	97 kg (214 lb)	27 December 1983	Rīga	(Kazakhstan) Beibarys Atyrau (KAZ)
24	F	Miķelis Rēdlihs	181 cm (5 ft 11 in)	81 kg (179 lb)	1 July 1984	Rīga	(Russia) Lokomotiv Yaroslavl (KHL)
28	F	Zemgus Girgensons	188 cm (6 ft 2 in)	88 kg (194 lb)	5 January 1994	Rīga	(United States) Buffalo Sabres (NHL)
29	D	Ralfs Freibergs	180 cm (5 ft 11 in)	87 kg (192 lb)	17 May 1991	Rīga	(United States) Bowling Green Falcons (NCAA)
31	G	Edgars Masaļskis	179 cm (5 ft 10 in)	85 kg (187 lb)	31 March 1980	Rīga	(Slovakia) HK Poprad (SVK)
32	D	Artūrs Kulda	188 cm (6 ft 2 in)	98 kg (216 lb)	25 July 1988	Leipzig, Germany	(Russia) Salavat Yulaev Ufa (KHL)
37	D	Oskars Bārtulis – A	190 cm (6 ft 3 in)	92 kg (203 lb)	21 January 1987	Ogre	(Ukraine) Donbass Donetsk (KHL)
47	F	Mārtiņš Cipulis	181 cm (5 ft 11 in)	85 kg (187 lb)	29 November 1980	Cēsis	(Latvia) Dinamo Riga (KHL)
50	G	Kristers Gudļevskis	193 cm (6 ft 4 in)	86 kg (190 lb)	31 July 1992	Aizkraukle	(United States) Syracuse Crunch (AHL)
51	F	Koba Jass	183 cm (6 ft 0 in)	87 kg (192 lb)	4 May 1990	Rīga	(Czech Republic) Bílí Tygři Liberec (CZE)
70	F	Miks Indrašis	190 cm (6 ft 3 in)	85 kg (187 lb)	30 September 1990	Rīga	(Latvia) Dinamo Riga (KHL)
79	F	Vitālijs Pavlovs	195 cm (6 ft 5 in)	98 kg (216 lb)	17 June 1989	Rīga	(Latvia) Dinamo Riga (KHL)
81	D	Georgijs Pujacs	184 cm (6 ft 0 in)	98 kg (216 lb)	11 June 1981	Rīga	(Latvia) Dinamo Riga (KHL)
91	F	Ronalds Ķēniņš	182 cm (6 ft 0 in)	91 kg (201 lb)	28 February 1991	Rīga	(Switzerland) ZSC Lions (NLA)

Group stage

Team	Pld	W	OTW	OTL	L	GF	GA	GD	Pts	Qualification
Sweden	3	3	0	0	0	10	5	+5	9	Quarterfinals
Switzerland	3	2	0	0	1	2	1	+1	6	
Czech Republic	3	1	0	0	2	6	7	−1	3	
Latvia	3	0	0	0	3	5	10	−5	0	

Source: ESPN

12 February 2014; 21:00	Latvia	0–1 (0–0, 0–0, 0–1)	Switzerland	Shayba Arena, Sochi; Attendance: 5,116

Game reference
Edgars Masaļskis	Goalies	Jonas Hiller	Referees: (Germany) Lars Brüggemann (United States) Brad Meier; Linesmen: (Canada) Derek Amell (Finland) Sakari Suominen
0–1 / 59:52 – S. Moser (M. Streit)			Referees: (Germany) Lars Brüggemann (United States) Brad Meier; Linesmen: (Canada) Derek Amell (Finland) Sakari Suominen
10 min	Penalties	6 min	Referees: (Germany) Lars Brüggemann (United States) Brad Meier; Linesmen: (Canada) Derek Amell (Finland) Sakari Suominen
21	Shots	39	Referees: (Germany) Lars Brüggemann (United States) Brad Meier; Linesmen: (Canada) Derek Amell (Finland) Sakari Suominen

14 February 2014; 12:00	Czech Republic	4–2 (2–1, 2–1, 0–0)	Latvia	Bolshoy Ice Dome, Sochi; Attendance: 5,831

Game reference

Ondřej Pavelec
Goalies
Edgars Masaļskis
Referees:
(United States) Tim Peel
(Finland) Jyri Rönn
Linesmen:
(Germany) André Schrader
(Canada) Mark Wheler

M. Erat (D. Krejčí, A. Hemský) – 10:10	1–0
	1–1	13:05 – J. Sprukts (K. Rēdlihs, L. Dārziņš) (PP)
J. Jágr (M. Židlický, T. Plekanec) (PP) – 19:29	2–1
	2–2	22:45 – H. Vasiļjevs (G. Pujacs)
J. Voráček (Z. Michálek) – 27:06	3–2
M. Židlický (M. Hanzal, P. Nedvěd) – 37:02	4–2

8 min
Penalties
8 min
39
Shots
20

15 February 2014; 21:00	Sweden	5–3 (1–1, 3–1, 1–1)	Latvia	Shayba Arena, Sochi; Attendance: 3,709

Game reference

Henrik Lundqvist
Goalies
Kristers Gudļevskis
Referees:
(Czech Republic) Antonín Jeřábek
(United States) Ian Walsh
Linesmen:
(United States) Tommy George
(United States) Andy McElman

P. Berglund (E. Karlsson, A. Steen) (PP) – 15:50	1–0
	1–1	18:48 – L. Dārziņš (J. Sprukts, K. Sotnieks)
	1–2	21:22 – J. Sprukts (K. Rēdlihs, M. Karsums) (PP)
E. Karlsson (N. Bäckström, D. Alfredsson) (PP) – 22:45	2–2
D. Alfredsson (D. Sedin, A. Edler) (PP) – 36:14	3–2
Ji. Ericsson (O. Ekman-Larsson, J. Silfverberg) (PP) – 38:47	4–2
	4–3	41:28 – Z. Girgensons (K. Daugaviņš, R. Freibergs) (PP)
A. Edler (D. Sedin, M. Johansson) – 52:20	5–3

12 min
Penalties
12 min
30
Shots
23

Qualification playoff

18 February 2014; 21:00	Switzerland	1–3 (0–2, 1–0, 0–1)	Latvia	Bolshoy Ice Dome, Sochi; Attendance: 7,912

Game reference

Jonas Hiller
Goalies
Edgars Masaļskis
Referees:
(Canada) Mike Leggo
(Finland) Jyri Rönn
Linesmen:
(Canada) Brad Kovachik
(Germany) André Schrader

	0–1	8:38 – O. Bārtulis (K. Daugaviņš, Z. Girgensons)
	0–2	11:19 – L. Dārziņš (M. Rēdlihs) (PP)
M. Plüss (R. Suri) – 35:01	1–2
	1–3	59:00 – L. Dārziņš (V. Pavlovs, E. Masaļskis) (EN)

4 min
Penalties
2 min
33
Shots
22

Quarterfinal

19 February 2014; 21:00	Canada	2–1 (1–1, 0–0, 1–0)	Latvia	Bolshoy Ice Dome, Sochi; Attendance: 9,825

Game reference

Carey Price
Goalies
Kristers Gudļevskis
Referees:
(United States) Tim Peel
(Finland) Jyri Rönn
Linesmen:
(Canada) Brad Kovachik
(Finland) Sakari Suominen

P. Sharp (R. Nash) – 13:37	1–0
	1–1	15:41 – L. Dārziņš (A. Kulda, J. Sprukts)
S. Weber (D. Doughty, J. Toews) (PP) – 53:06	2–1

6 min
Penalties
6 min
57
Shots
16

== Luge ==
Latvia achieved the following quota places:

Men

Athlete	Event	Run 1		Run 2		Run 3		Run 4		Total	
Athlete	Event	Time	Rank	Time	Rank	Time	Rank	Time	Rank	Time	Rank
Inārs Kivlenieks	Singles	52.872	15	52.927	20	52.347	16	52.379	17	3:30.525	16
Kristaps Mauriņš	Singles	53.144	23	52.923	19	52.518	21	52.630	23	3:31.215	21
Mārtiņš Rubenis	Singles	52.775	=11	52.560	7	52.229	10	52.133	5	3:29.697	10
Oskars Gudramovičs; Pēteris Kalniņš	Doubles	50.388	12	50.074	9	—N/a				1:40.462	10
Andris Šics; Juris Šics	Doubles	49.880	5	49.910	3	—N/a				1:39.790	3rd place, bronze medalist(s)

Women

Athlete	Event	Run 1		Run 2		Run 3		Run 4		Total	
Athlete	Event	Time	Rank	Time	Rank	Time	Rank	Time	Rank	Time	Rank
Elīza Tīruma	Singles	50.926	11	50.651	12	50.758	12	50.736	13	3:23.071	12
Ulla Zirne	Singles	51.125	15	51.159	21	51.054	15	51.347	21	3:24.685	18

Mixed team relay

Athlete	Event	Run 1		Run 2		Run 3		Total	
Athlete	Event	Time	Rank	Time	Rank	Time	Rank	Time	Rank
Mārtiņš Rubenis; Andris Šics; Juris Šics; Elīza Tīruma	Team relay	54.745	5	56.048	4	56.502	4	2:47.295	3rd place, bronze medalist(s)

== Short track speed skating ==
Men

Athlete	Event	Heat		Semifinal		Final	
Athlete	Event	Time	Rank	Time	Rank	Time	Rank
Roberto Puķītis	1500 m	2:30.671	5 ADV	2:16.961	5	Did not advance	15

Qualification legend: ADV – Advanced due to being impeded by another skater; FA – Qualify to medal round; FB – Qualify to consolation round

== Skeleton ==
Latvia had three athletes in qualification positions.

Athlete	Event	Run 1		Run 2		Run 3		Run 4		Total	
Athlete	Event	Time	Rank	Time	Rank	Time	Rank	Time	Rank	Time	Rank
Martins Dukurs	Men's	56.18	2	56.37	2	56.26	1	56.29	2	3:45.10	2nd place, silver medalist(s)
Tomass Dukurs	Men's	57.03	6	57.06	12	56.75	5	56.74	=7	3:47.58	4
Lelde Priedulēna	Women's	59.73	16	59.31	11	58.73	12	58.51	10	3:56.28	14

== Speed skating ==
Men

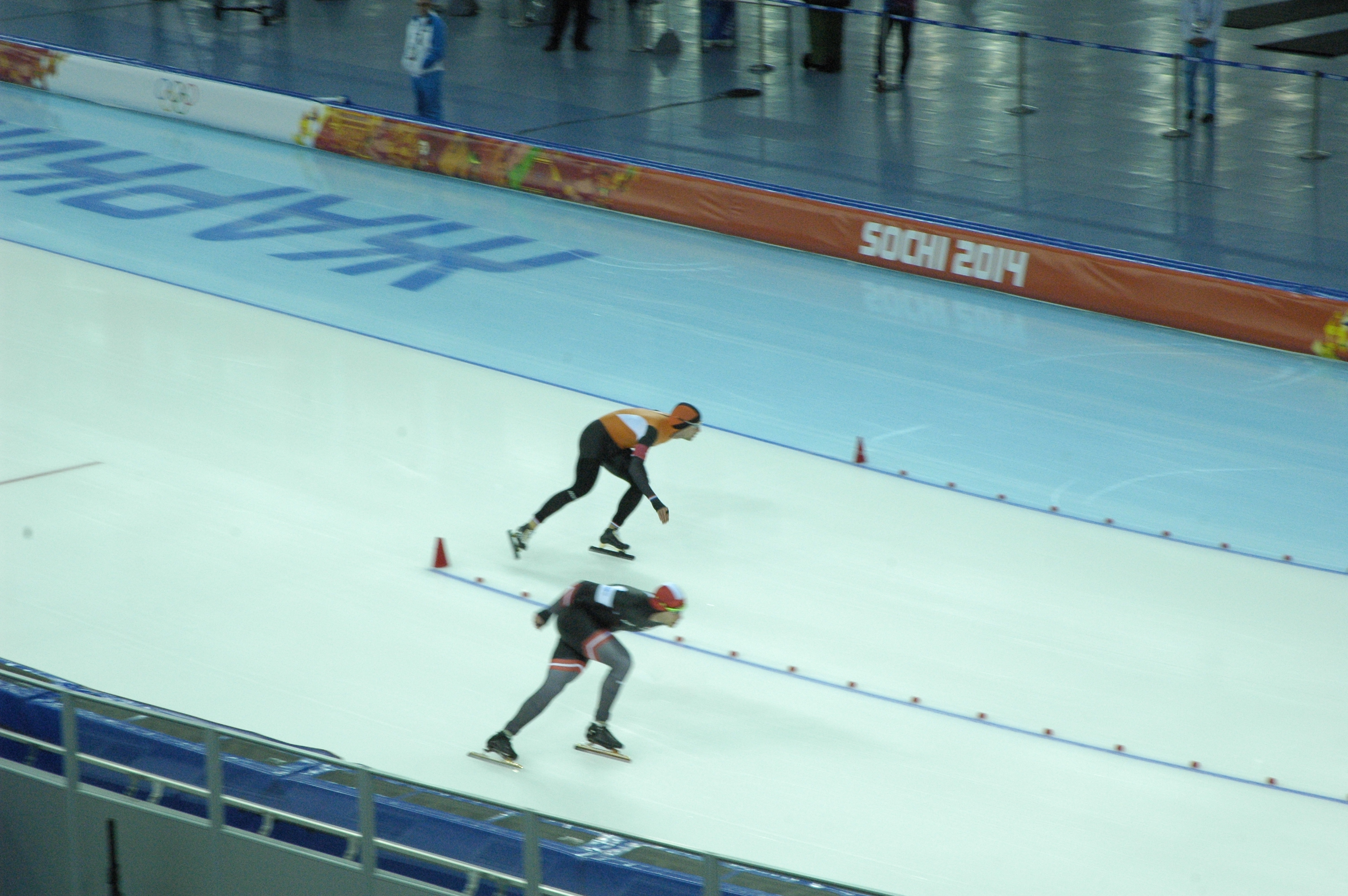
Haralds Silovs (under) riding the 1500 m

Athlete	Event	Race 1		Race 2		Final	
Athlete	Event	Time	Rank	Time	Rank	Time	Rank
Haralds Silovs	500 m	36.12	39	36.32	38	72.44	37
Haralds Silovs	1000 m	—N/a				1:10.29	24
Haralds Silovs	1500 m	—N/a				1:46.79	14
