= Felix Loch =

German luger (born 1989)

- Loch in 2026

Personal information
- Born: 24 July 1989 (age 37) Sonneberg, East Germany
- Height: 1.91 m (6 ft 3 in)
- Weight: 90 kg (198 lb)
- Website: FelixLoch.de

Sport
- Country: Germany
- Sport: Luge
- Event: Singles
- Club: RC Berchtesgaden
- Turned pro: 2006
- Coached by: Norbert Loch; Patric Leitner; Georg Hackl

Achievements and titles
- Personal best: 153.98 km/h (95.68 mph)
Medal record
Men's luge
Representing Germany
Olympic Games
Gold medal – first place	2010 Vancouver	Singles
Gold medal – first place	2014 Sochi	Singles
Gold medal – first place	2014 Sochi	Mixed team
World Championships
Gold medal – first place	2008 Oberhof	Singles
Gold medal – first place	2008 Oberhof	Mixed team
Gold medal – first place	2009 Lake Placid	Singles
Gold medal – first place	2009 Lake Placid	Mixed team
Gold medal – first place	2012 Altenberg	Singles
Gold medal – first place	2012 Altenberg	Mixed team
Gold medal – first place	2013 Whistler	Singles
Gold medal – first place	2013 Whistler	Mixed team
Gold medal – first place	2015 Sigulda	Mixed team
Gold medal – first place	2016 Königssee	Singles
Gold medal – first place	2016 Königssee	Sprint
Gold medal – first place	2016 Königssee	Mixed team
Gold medal – first place	2019 Winterberg	Singles
Gold medal – first place	2023 Oberhof	Sprint
Silver medal – second place	2011 Cesana	Singles
Silver medal – second place	2015 Sigulda	Singles
Silver medal – second place	2019 Winterberg	Sprint
Silver medal – second place	2021 Königssee	Singles
Silver medal – second place	2021 Königssee	Mixed team
Silver medal – second place	2025 Whistler	Singles
Bronze medal – third place	2019 Winterberg	Team relay
Bronze medal – third place	2024 Alternberg	Singles
European Championships
Gold medal – first place	2013 Oberhof	Singles
Gold medal – first place	2013 Oberhof	Mixed team
Gold medal – first place	2015 Sochi	Mixed team
Gold medal – first place	2016 Altenberg	Singles
Gold medal – first place	2016 Altenberg	Mixed team
Gold medal – first place	2021 Sigulda	Singles
Gold medal – first place	2026 Oberhof	Team relay
Silver medal – second place	2018 Sigulda	Singles
Silver medal – second place	2018 Sigulda	Mixed team
Silver medal – second place	2023 Sigulda	Singles
Silver medal – second place	2026 Oberhof	Singles
Silver medal – second place	2026 Oberhof	Mixed singles
Bronze medal – third place	2012 Paramonovo	Singles
Bronze medal – third place	2015 Sochi	Singles
Bronze medal – third place	2021 Sigulda	Mixed team
World Junior Championships
Gold medal – first place	2006 Altenberg	Singles
Gold medal – first place	2006 Altenberg	Mixed team
Gold medal – first place	2007 Cesana	Singles
Gold medal – first place	2007 Cesana	Mixed team
Silver medal – second place	2008 Lake Placid	Singles

Felix Loch (German pronunciation: [ˈfeːlɪks ˈlɔx]; born 24 July 1989) is a German luger and Olympic champion. He has been competing since 1995 and on the German national team since 2006. He has won fourteen medals at the FIL World Luge Championships, including twelve golds (Men's singles: 2008, 2009, 2012, 2013, 2015, 2016; Men's sprint 2016: Mixed team event: 2008, 2009, 2012, 2013, 2015, 2016) and two silvers (Men's singles: 2011, 2015). Loch's men's singles win in 2008 made him the youngest world champion ever at 18 years old. He is the youngest Olympic Gold Medalist in men's luge history. As of 2022, Loch is a triple Olympic gold medalist.

== Career ==
At the 2008 FIL European Luge Championships in Cesana, Italy, he finished sixth in the men's singles event.

Previously he had won the 2006 Junior World Championship held in Altenberg, Germany. Loch is a member of the Club RC Berchtesgaden and currently lives at Schönau am Königssee though he was born in Sonneberg.

During International Training Week at the Whistler Sliding Centre in Whistler, British Columbia on 7–15 November 2008, Loch injured his shoulder during training. Bob- und Schlittenverband für Deutschland (BSD) Sport Director Thomas Schwab stated that Loch would compete at the opening Luge World Cup event at Igls, Austria on 29–30 November 2008, which Loch did.

On 21 February 2009, during the 2008-09 Luge World Cup season finale at Whistler Sliding Centre, Loch recorded the fastest registered speed in luge, 153.98 km/h (95.68 mph).

At the 2014 Winter Olympics in Sochi, Russia, Loch again won the gold medal in men's Singles, marking his second consecutive Olympic victory, and he was also in the German team which won gold in the inaugural team relay.

At the 2018 Winter Olympics, in the men's singles competition, Loch was a heavy favorite and indeed was leading the field after three runs, but in the last run made a mistake that cost him a medal. He ended in the fifth position.

At the 2026 Winter Olympics, Loch entered the men singles event as a favorite to medal, but finished in sixth place. Following the 2026 games, he announced his intention to continue to compete and aim for a spot at the 2030 Winter Olympics in France.

In March 2026, Loch won his 8th Luge World Cup men's singles title.

== Luge results ==
=== Olympic Games ===
Event	Age	Singles	Team relay
(Canada) 2010 Vancouver	20	Gold	—N/a
(Russia) 2014 Sochi	24	Gold	Gold
(South Korea) 2018 Pyeongchang	28	5th	—
(China) 2022 Beijing	32	4th	—
(Italy) 2026 Milan-Cortina	36	6th	—

=== World Championships ===
- 21 medals – (14 gold, 5 silver, 2 bronze)

Year	Age	Singles	Sprint	Team relay	Mixed singles
(Germany) 2008 Oberhof	19	Gold	—N/a	Gold	—N/a
(United States) 2009 Lake Placid	20	Gold	—N/a	Gold	—N/a
(Italy) 2011 Cesena	22	Silver	—N/a	—N/a	—N/a
(Germany) 2012 Altenberg	23	Gold	—N/a	Gold	—N/a
(Canada) 2013 Whistler	24	Gold	—N/a	Gold	—N/a
(Latvia) 2015 Sigulda	26	Silver	—N/a	Gold	—N/a
(Germany) 2016 Königssee	27	Gold	Gold	Gold	—N/a
(Austria) 2017 Innsbruck	28	6th	10th	—	—N/a
(Germany) 2019 Winterberg	30	Gold	Silver	Bronze	—N/a
(Russia) 2020 Sochi	31	9th	13th	—	—N/a
(Germany) 2021 Königssee	32	Silver	4th	Silver	—N/a
(Germany) 2023 Oberhof	33	4th	Gold	—	—N/a
(Germany) 2024 Altenberg	34	Bronze	4th	—	—N/a
(Canada) 2025 Whistler	35	Silver	—N/a	—	—

=== World Cup ===
Season	Singles									Sprint				Team relay						Points	Overall	Singles	Sprint
Season	1	2	3	4	5	6	7	8	9	1	2	3	4	1	2	3	4	5	6	Points	Overall	Singles	Sprint
2006–07	–	10	18	–	6	9	7	–	24	—N/a	—N/a	—N/a	—N/a	–	–	–	–	—N/a	—N/a	211	16th	—N/a	—N/a
2007–08	5	10	8	12	4	–	7	15	—N/a	—N/a	—N/a	—N/a	—N/a	3	–	–	–	—N/a	—N/a	297	6th	—N/a	—N/a
2008–09	–	–	–	3	2	2	2	2	3	—N/a	—N/a	—N/a	—N/a	–	–	–	–	–	—N/a	480	4th	—N/a	—N/a
2009–10	4	4	1	3	9	17	7	2	—N/a	—N/a	—N/a	—N/a	—N/a	–	1	1	–	–	—N/a	484	3rd	—N/a	—N/a
2010–11	1	4	3	4	5	1	1	2	14	—N/a	—N/a	—N/a	—N/a	–	–	–	1	1	–	658	2nd	—N/a	—N/a
2011–12	1	1	2	1	1	1	4	1	3	—N/a	—N/a	—N/a	—N/a	–	1	2	1	1	3	815	1st	—N/a	—N/a
2012–13	1	2	1	3	4	1	2	—	6	—N/a	—N/a	—N/a	—N/a	—	1	1	—	—	—	650	1st	—N/a	—N/a
2013–14	3	1	4	1	5	1	1	1	–	—N/a	—N/a	—N/a	—N/a	1	–	1	1	1	3	685	1st	—N/a	—N/a
2014–15	1	2	6	1	1	1	8	1	3	1	14	1	—N/a	1	1	1	1	1	1	975	2nd	—N/a	—N/a
2015–16	DSQ	6	3	1	1	1	1	1	6	3	1	1	—N/a	–	–	1	2	1	–	940	1st		
2016–17	4	6	6	5	4	4	1	DNS	2	1	4	4	—N/a	7	–	2	1	–	1	748	2nd		
2017–18	3	2	1	1	7	11	1	5	2	1	10	8	3	1	1	1	–	1	2	923	1st		—N/a
2018–19	6	2	4	5	10	9	1	7	8	3	8	4	—N/a	2	1	–	3	–	2	685	3rd		
2019–20	6	12	2	3	15	27	5	–	4	13	4	–	—N/a	3	2	4	–	–	1	482	7th		
2020–21	1	1	1	1	1	1	1	1	3	1	5	3	—N/a	1	4	1	2	3	CNX	1095	1st	1st	1st
2021–22	2	2	6	4	–	6	2	3	4	7	–	1	—N/a	–	–	–	–	–	–	691	3rd	3rd	6th
2022–23	15	1	2	4	2	3	3	2	7	–	3	3	—N/a	1	2	–	–	–	–	767	2nd	1st	6th
