= 2015 FIL World Luge Championships =

2015 FIL World Luge Championships
Individual	men		women
Doubles	doubles
Relay		mixed

The 2015 FIL World Luge Championships took place under the auspices of the International Luge Federation at the Sigulda bobsleigh, luge, and skeleton track in Sigulda, Latvia from 14–15 February 2015.

== Schedule ==
Four events were held.

Date	Time	Events
14 February	10:10	Doubles first run
14 February	11:30	Doubles second run
14 February	12:30	Women first run
14 February	14:15	Women second run
15 February	10:10	Men first run
15 February	12:10	Men second run
15 February	14:00	Team relay

== Medal summary ==
=== Medal table ===
Rank	Nation	Gold	Silver	Bronze	Total
1	Germany (GER)	3	1	1	5
2	Russia (RUS)	1	2	0	3
3	Austria (AUT)	0	1	1	2
4	Canada (CAN)	0	0	1	1
4	Italy (ITA)	0	0	1	1
Totals (5 entries)		4	4	4	12

=== Medalists ===
Event	Gold		Silver		Bronze	
Men's singles	Semen Pavlichenko; Russia	1:36.288	Felix Loch; Germany	1:36.359	Wolfgang Kindl; Austria	1:36.472
Women's singles	Natalie Geisenberger; Germany	1:24.142	Tatiana Ivanova; Russia	1:24.458	Tatjana Hüfner; Germany	1:24.463
Doubles	Tobias Wendl; Tobias Arlt; Germany	1:23.900	Peter Penz; Georg Fischler; Austria	1:24.036	Christian Oberstolz; Patrick Gruber; Italy	1:24.157
Team relay	Natalie Geisenberger; Felix Loch; Tobias Wendl/Tobias Arlt; Germany	2:13.152	Tatiana Ivanova; Semen Pavlichenko; Andrey Bogdanov/Andrey Medvedev; Russia	2:13.234	Alex Gough; Samuel Edney; Tristan Walker/Justin Snith; Canada	2:14.129
