= FIL European Luge Championships 2015 =

The 2015 FIL European Luge Championships took place under the auspices of the International Luge Federation at Sochi, Russia from 27 February to 1 March 2015.

== Medalists ==
Event	Gold		Silver		Bronze	
Men's singles	Semen Pavlichenko; Russia	1:44.020	Aleksander Peretyagin; Russia	1:44.252	Felix Loch; Germany	1:44.339
Women's singles	Dajana Eitberger; Germany	1:40.510	Natalie Geisenberger; Germany	1:40.520	Tatiana Ivanova; Russia	1:40.601
Doubles	Tobias Arlt/Tobias Wendl; Germany	1:39.559	Peter Penz/Georg Fischler; Austria	1:39.854	Andris Šics/Juris Šics; Latvia	1:40.137
Team relay	Germany; Dajana Eitberger; Felix Loch; Tobias Arlt/Tobias Wendl	2:45.468	Russia; Tatiana Ivanova; Semen Pavlichenko; Alexander Denisyev/Vladislav Antonov	2:45.528	Latvia; Elīza Tīruma; Inārs Kivlenieks; Andris Šics/Juris Šics	2:45.775

== Medal table ==
* Host nation (Russia)

Rank	Nation	Gold	Silver	Bronze	Total
1	Germany	3	1	1	5
2	Russia*	1	2	1	4
3	Austria	0	1	0	1
4	Latvia	0	0	2	2
Totals (4 entries)		4	4	4	12
