= Mitchel Malyk =

Canadian luger (born 1995)

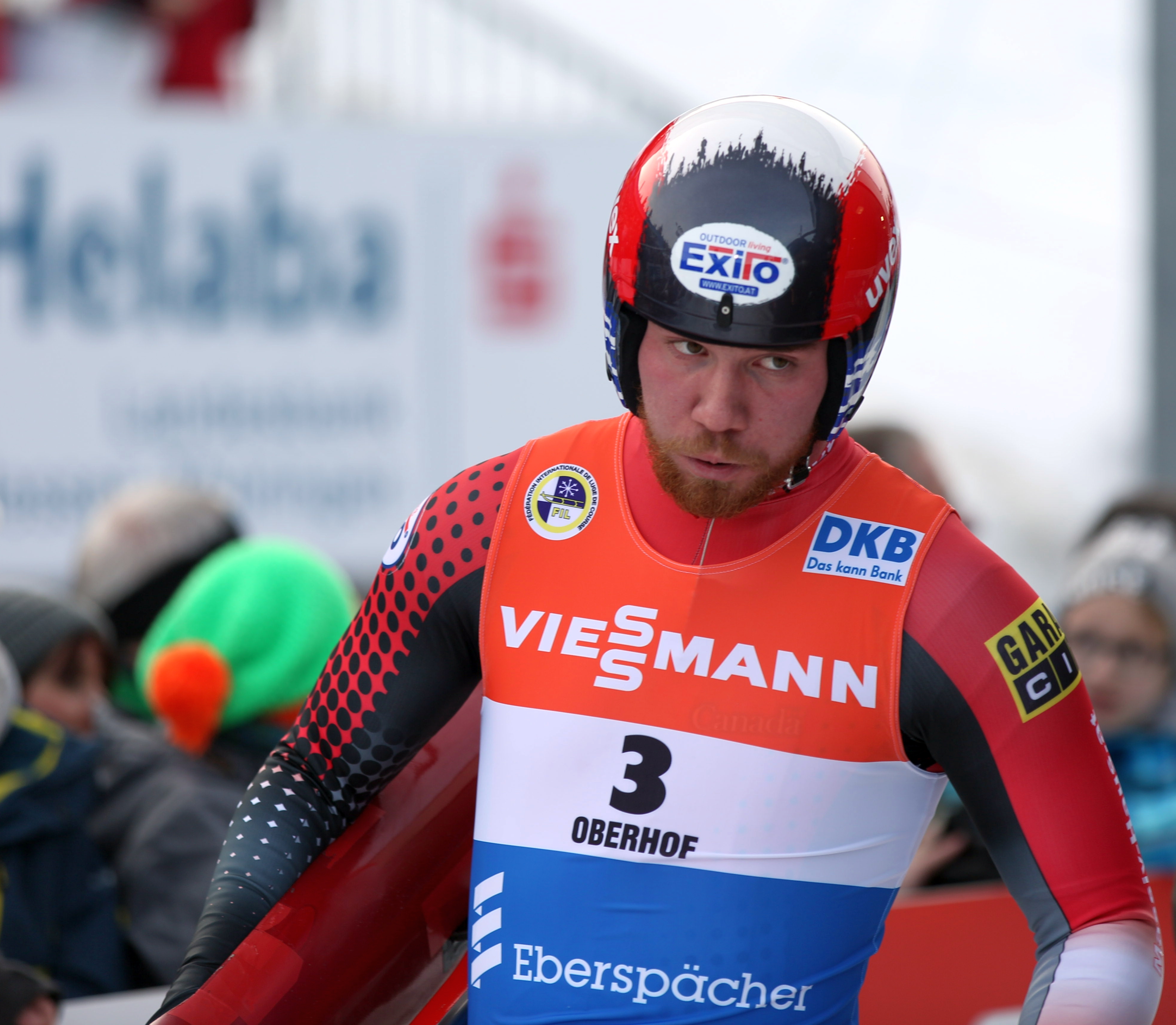
- Malyk in 2017

Personal information
- Born: October 7, 1995 (age 30) Calgary, Alberta, Canada
Medal record
World Championships
Bronze medal – third place	2016 Königssee	Mixed team

Mitchel Malyk (born October 7, 1995) is a Canadian luger who has competed since 2011. He competed in the first ever Youth Olympics in Innsbruck, Austria, where he finished 5th. Malyk competed for Canada at the 2014 Winter Olympics in Sochi, Russia in the men's single competition in which he placed 26th.
