= Hidenari Kanayama =

Japanese luger (born 1990)

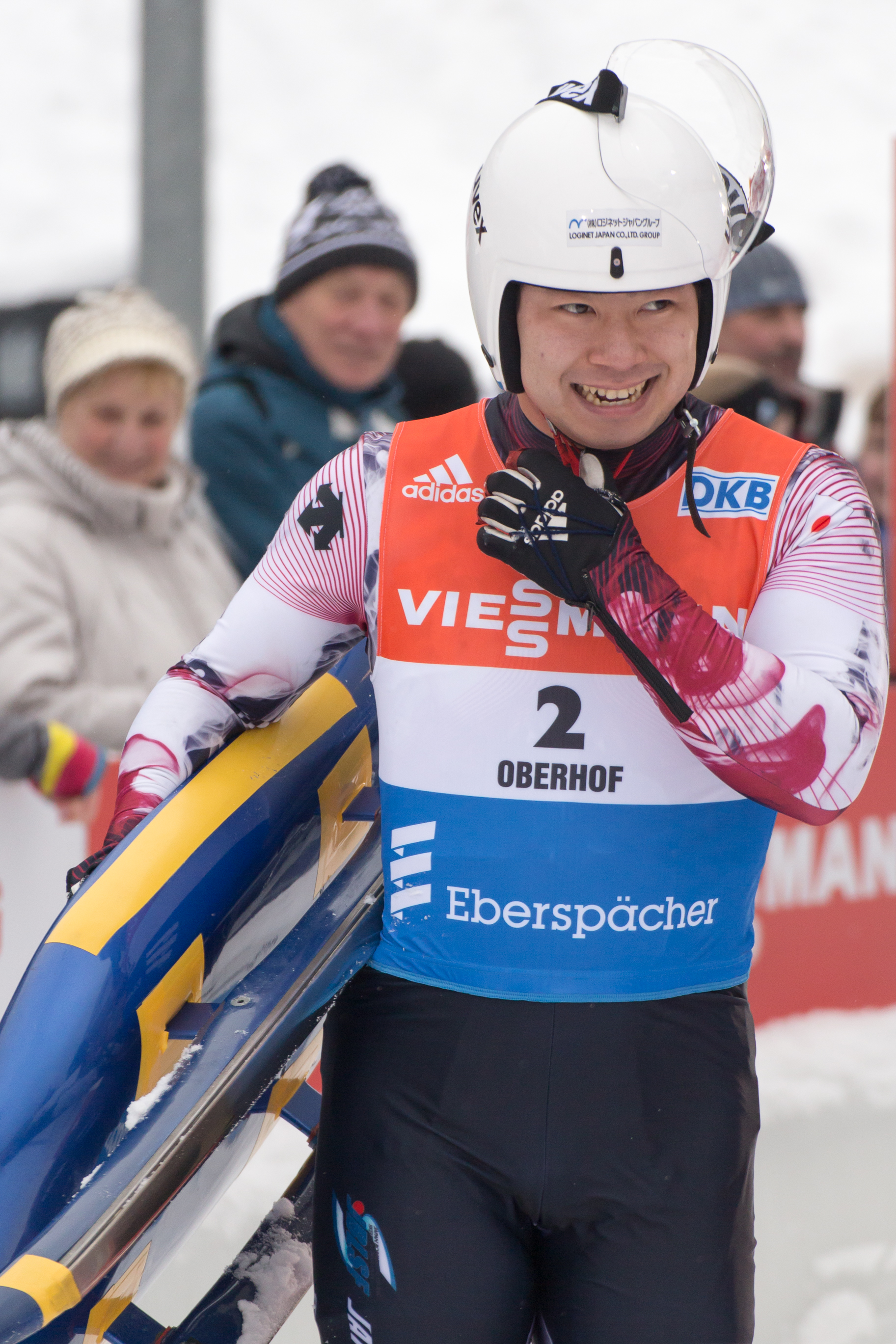
Kanayama in 2016

Hidenari Kanayama (金山 英勢, born 26 September 1990 in Sapporo) is a Japanese luger. He competed at the 2014 Winter Olympics. He became interested in sliding sports during elementary school after seeing skeleton racer Kazuhiro Koshi on television.
