= John Fennell =

American-Canadian luger (born 1995)

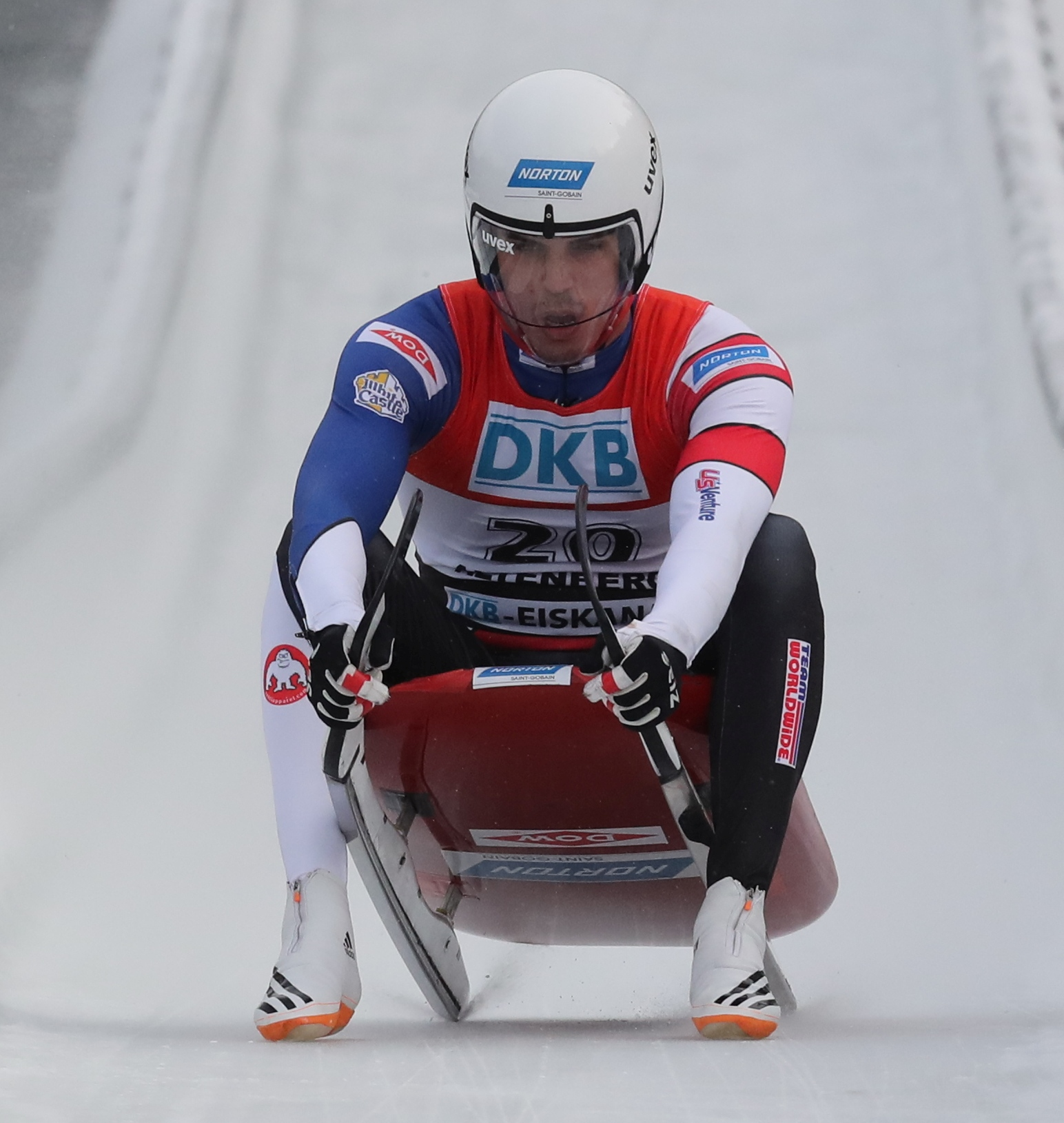

Personal information
- Born: May 28, 1995 (age 31) Evergreen, Colorado, U.S.

Sport
- Country: United States
- Sport: Luge

John Fennell (born May 28, 1995) is an American-Canadian luger who has competed since 2011.

== Career ==
He competed for Canada in the first-ever Youth Olympics in Innsbruck, Austria, where he finished 7th, and at the 2014 Winter Olympics in Sochi, Russia, finishing 27th.

Fennell competed well at the Sochi Olympics, but since he did not finish in the top 10. As a result, in order to fulfil his funding needs, Fennell launched a fundraising campaign on the sports crowdfunding platform MAKEACHAMP on December 12, 2014.

In 2016, Fennell took advantage of his dual Canadian-U.S. citizenship and competed for a spot on the U.S. National team. However, during the 2018 U.S. Olympic trials, he crashed his sled and did not make the Olympic team.

== Personal life ==
He is the son of former Canadian Football League player Dave Fennell and mother Lynne Fennell. His brother David Fennell Jr. played fullback on the Michigan State football team.

In May 2014, several months after competing at Sochi, Fennell came out as gay.
