= Aleksander Peretyagin =

Russian luger (born 1992)

Medal record

Men's luge

Representing Russia

European Championships
Silver medal – second place	2015 Sochi	Men's singles

Aleksander Peretyagin (Александр Перетягин; born 2 February 1992 in Bratsk) is a Russian luger, lives in Chusovoy. He competed at the 2014 Winter Olympics
