= Tønnes Stang Rolfsen =

Norwegian luger (born 1988)

Personal information
- Born: 21 January 1988 (age 38) Oslo, Norway

Sport
- Sport: Luge

Tønnes Stang Rolfsen (born 21 January 1988) is a Norwegian luger. He was born in Oslo. He competed at the 2014 Winter Olympics in Sochi, where he placed 18th in the men's singles.
