= Stanislav Benyov =

Bulgarian luger (born 1991)

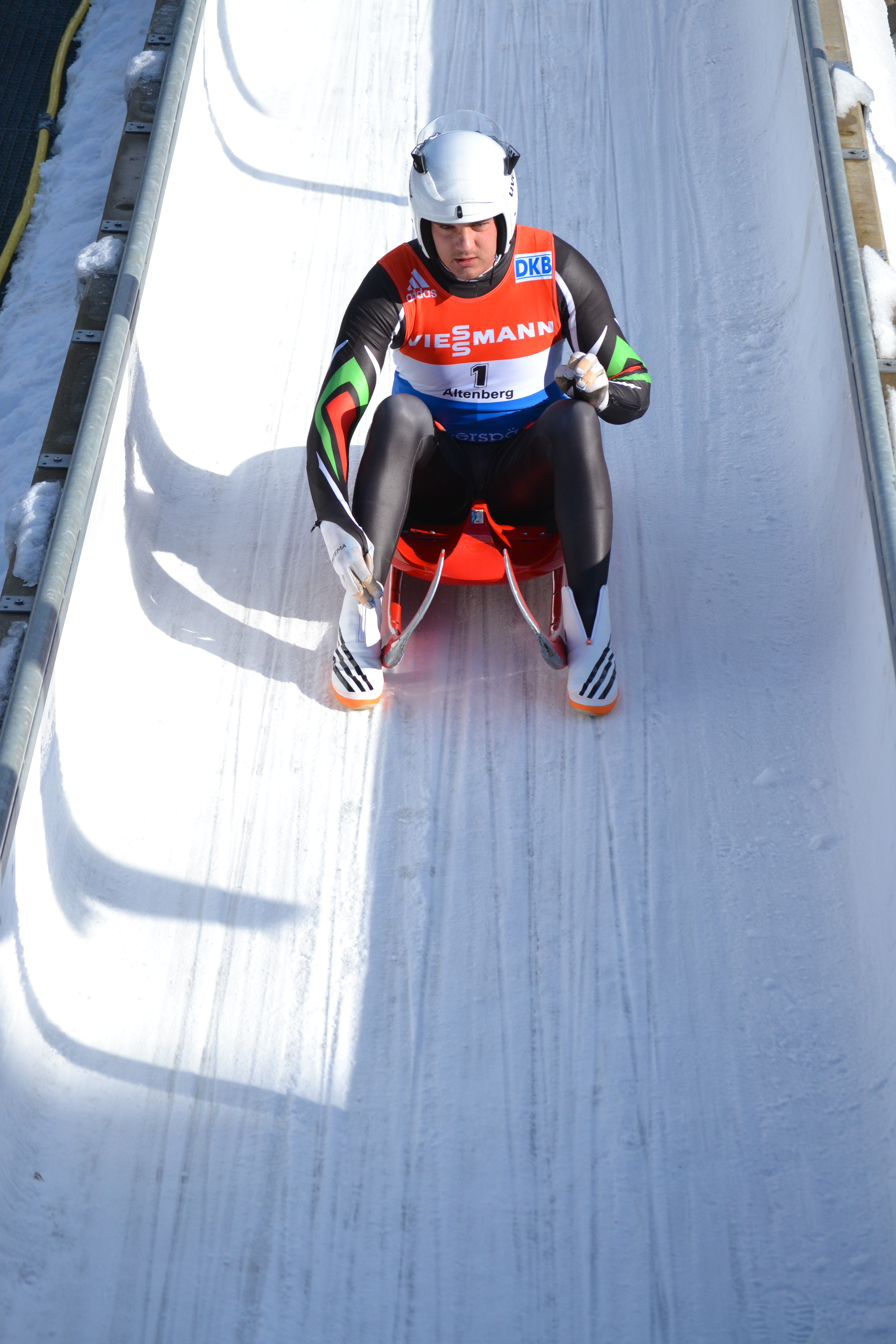
Benyov in 2015

Stanislav Benyov (Bulgarian: Станислав Беньов) (born 19 April 1991) is a Bulgarian luger. He competed at the 2014 Winter Olympics.
