= Thor Haug Nørbech =

Norwegian luger (born 1988)

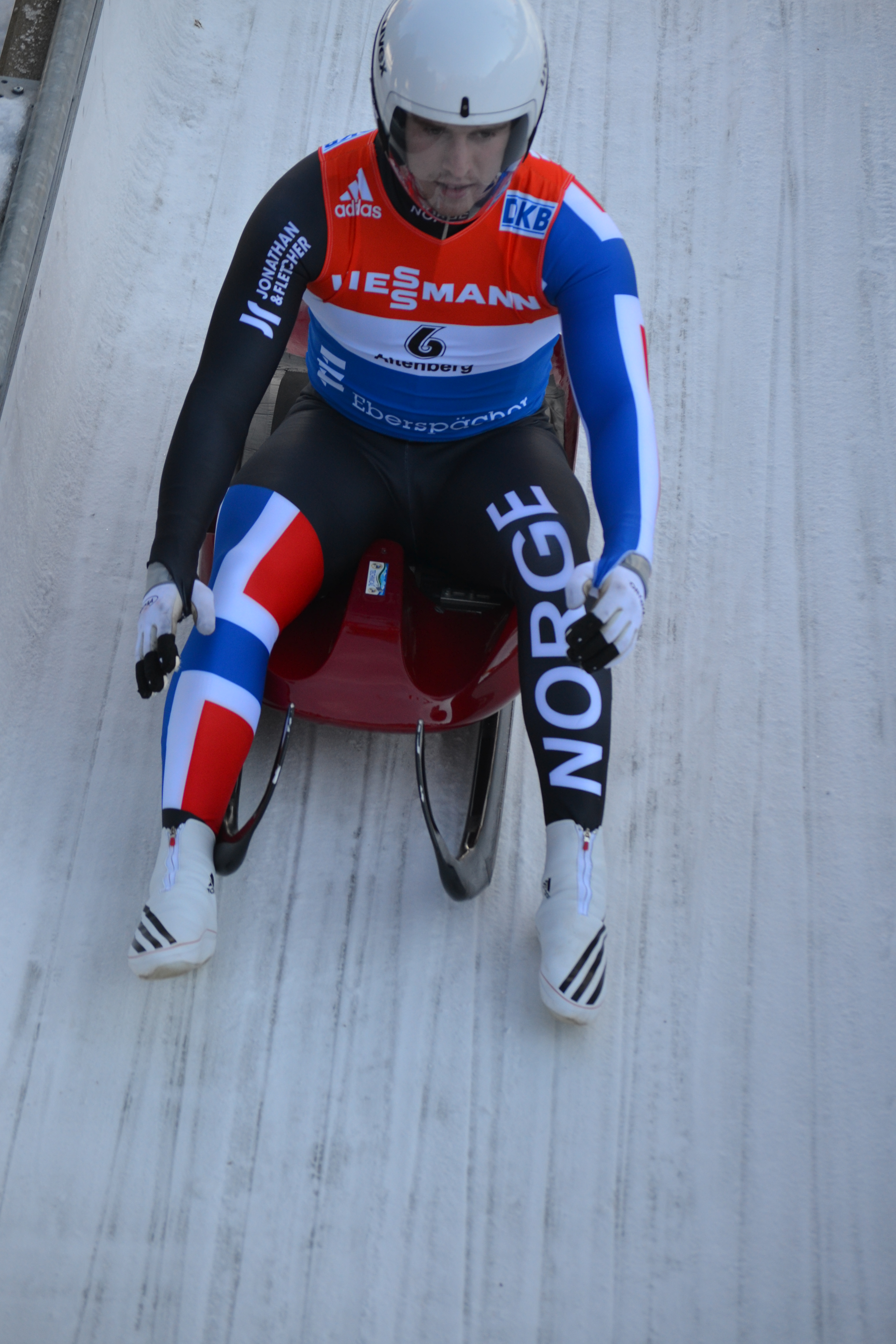
- Nørbech in 2015

Personal information
- Born: 29 December 1988 (age 37) Oslo, Norway

Sport
- Sport: Luge

Thor Haug Nørbech (born 29 December 1988) is a Norwegian luger. He was born in Oslo. He competed at the 2014 Winter Olympics in Sochi, where he placed 17th in the men's singles.
