= Aidan Kelly (luger) =

American luger (born 1994)

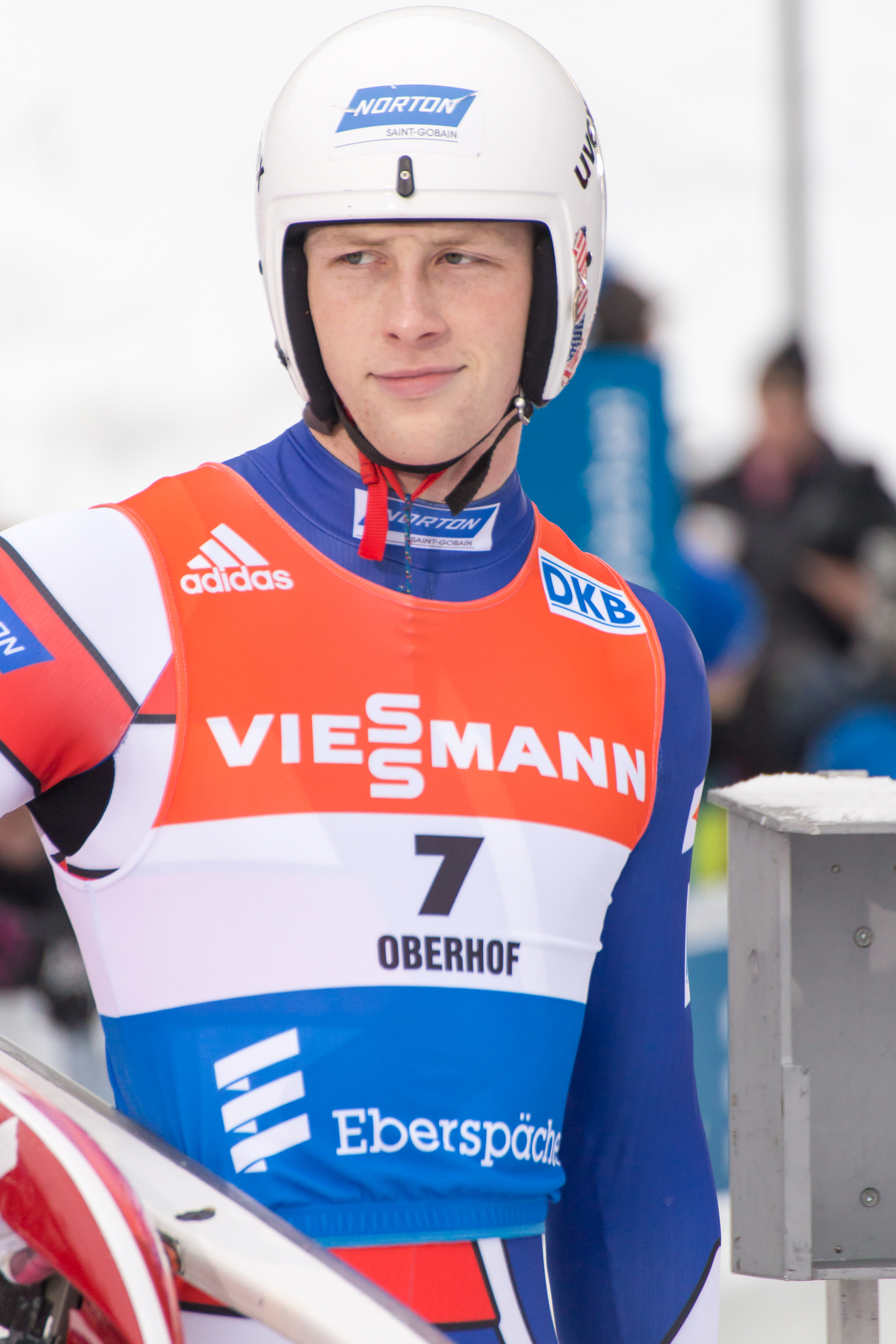
Kelly in 2016

Aidan Kelly (born September 6, 1994) is an American slider who raced for the United States in the men's luge singles event at the 2014 Winter Olympics in Sochi, Russia. He was the 2013 Norton junior U.S.A champion.

== Biography ==
Kelly attended National Sports Academy in Lake Placid, New York. He graduated top of his class in 2012 while he trained at the U.S. Olympic Training Center, also in Lake Placid.

Kelly resides in West Islip, New York.
