= Kristaps Mauriņš =

Latvian luger (born 1991)

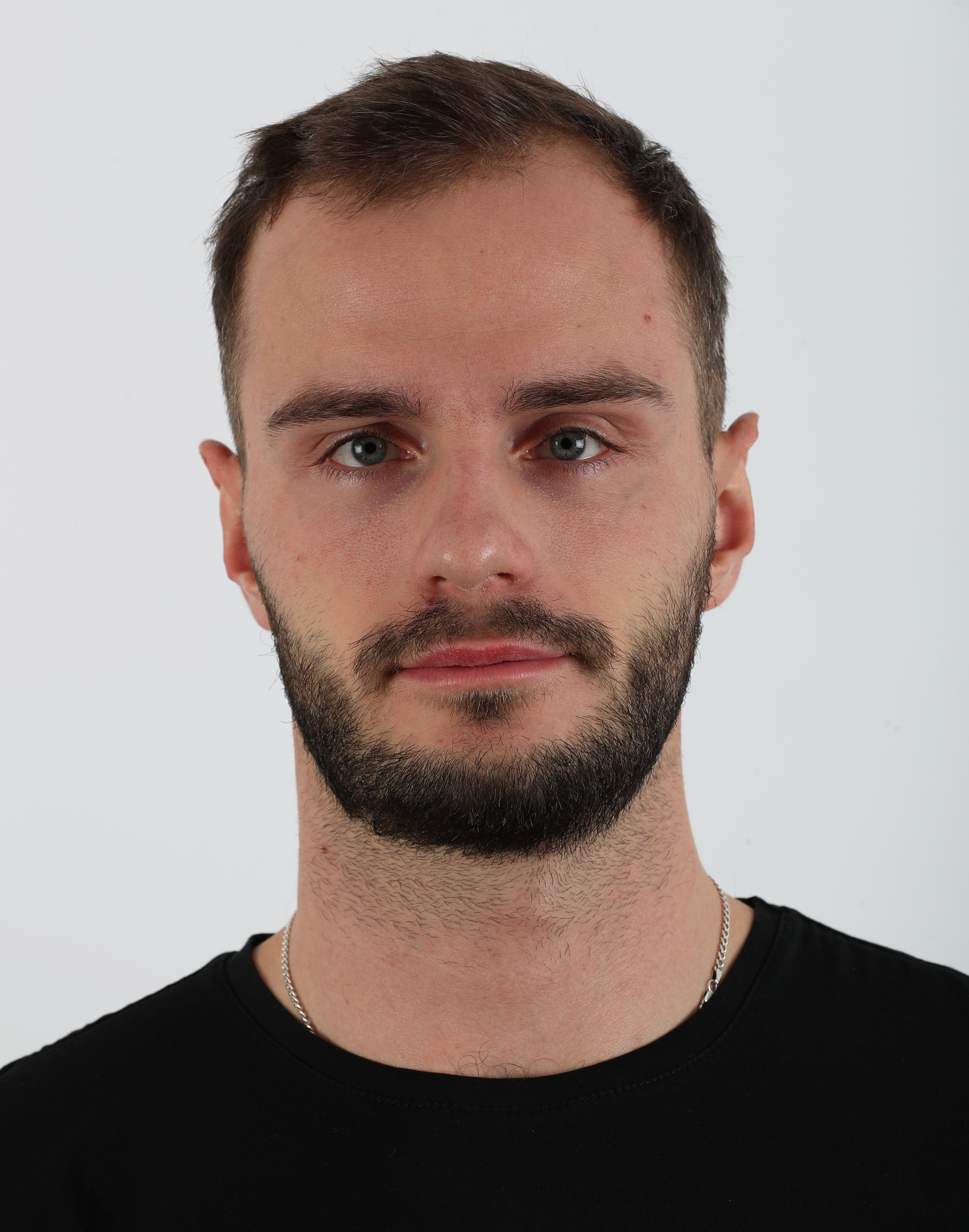
Kristaps Mauriņš in 2018

Kristaps Mauriņš (born 5 May 1991 in Cēsis) is a Latvian luger. He competed at the 2014 Winter Olympics, where he placed 21st in the men's singles event.
