= Andi Langenhan =

German luger (born 1984)

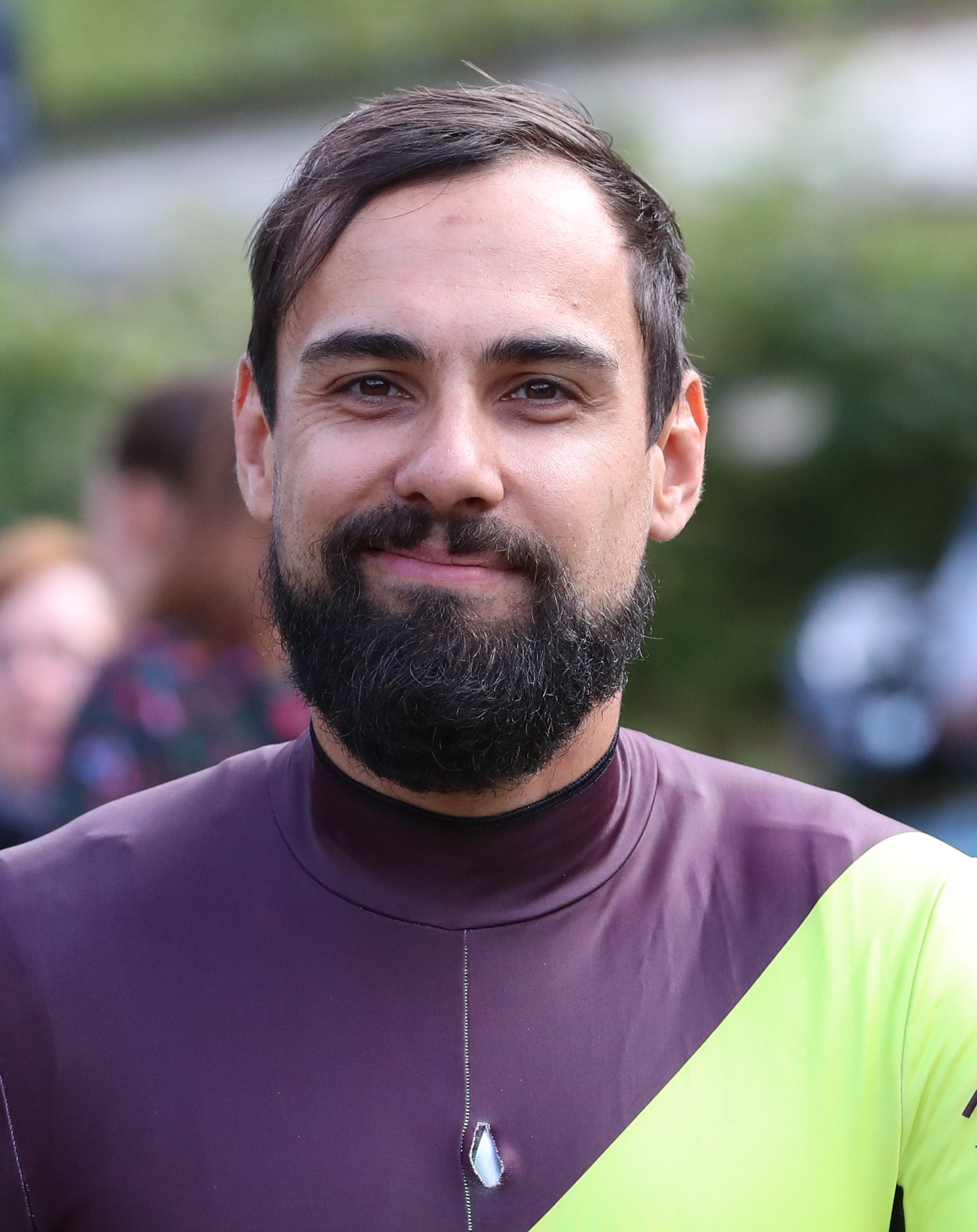
- Langenhan in 2018

Personal information
- Born: 1 October 1984 (age 41) Suhl, Bezirk Suhl, East Germany
- Height: 1.81 m (5 ft 11 in)
- Weight: 80 kg (176 lb)

Sport
- Country: Germany
- Sport: Luge
- Event: Singles
- Turned pro: 2001

Achievements and titles
- Olympic finals: 3rd (silver)
Medal record
World Championships
Silver medal – second place	2013 Whistler	Singles
Silver medal – second place	2016 Königssee	Sprint
Bronze medal – third place	2008 Oberhof	Singles
Bronze medal – third place	2011 Cesana	Singles
European Championships
Gold medal – first place	2012 Paramonovo	Singles
Silver medal – second place	2012 Paramonovo	Mixed team
Silver medal – second place	2013 Oberhof	Singles

Andi Langenhan (born 1 October 1984) is a German luger who has been competing since 1995 and has been on the German national team since 2001. He won two bronze medals in the men's singles event at the FIL World Luge Championships (2008, 2011).

Langenhan qualified for the 2010 Winter Olympics where he finished fifth.
