= Jo Alexander Koppang =

Norwegian luger (born 1988)

Personal information
- Nationality: Norwegian
- Born: 10 July 1988 (age 36); Oslo

Sport
- Sport: Luge

Jo Alexander Koppang (born 10 July 1988) is a Norwegian luger. He was born in Oslo. He competed at the 2014 Winter Olympics in Sochi, where he placed 34th in the men's singles.
