= Kim Dong-hyeon (luger) =

South Korean luger (born 1991)

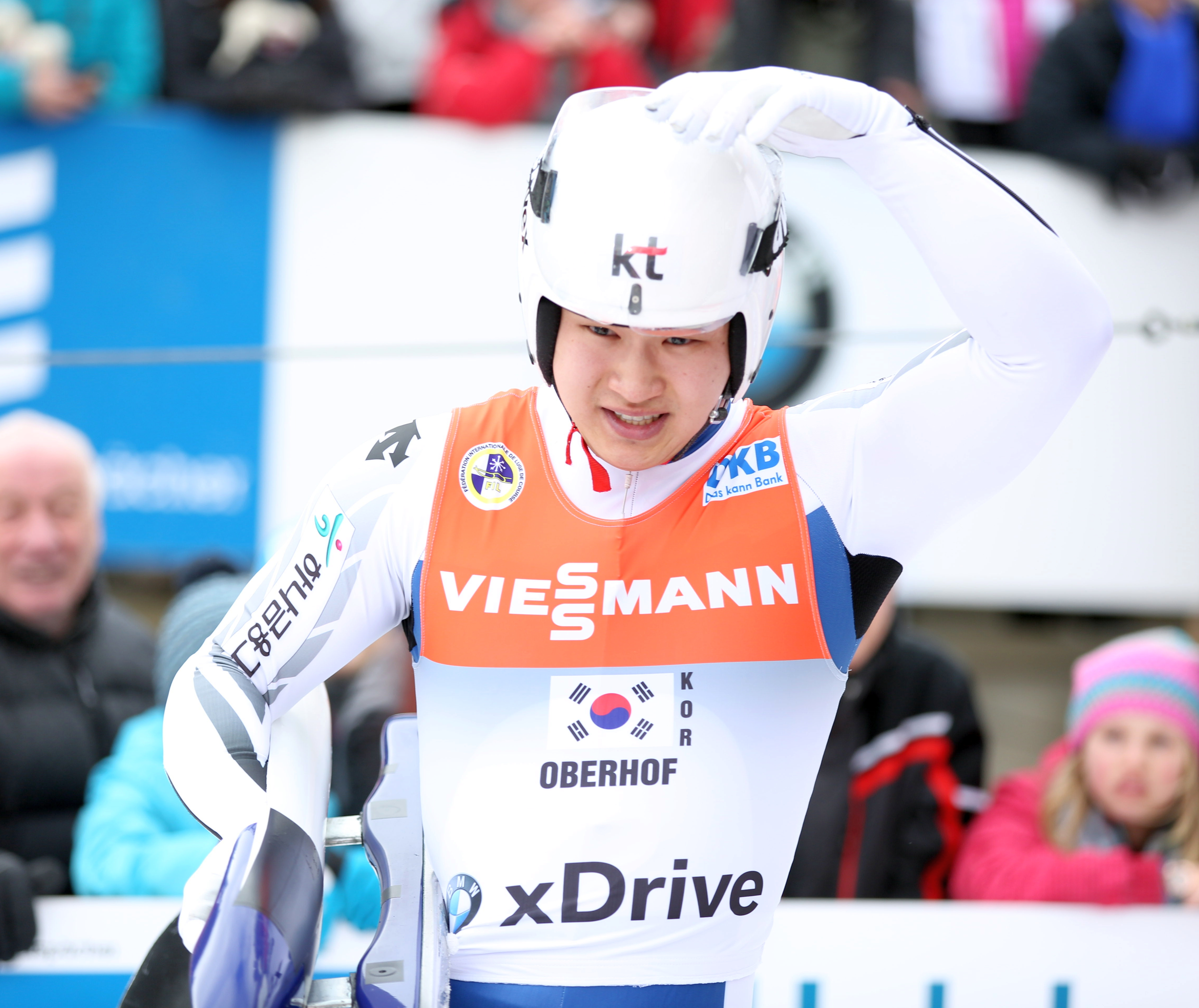
- Kim in 2017

Korean name
- Hangul: 김동현
- RR: Gim Donghyeon
- MR: Kim Tonghyŏn

Kim Dong-hyeon (born 24 September 1991) is a South Korean luger. He competed at the 2014 Winter Olympics.
