= Ondřej Hyman =

Czech luger (born 1986)

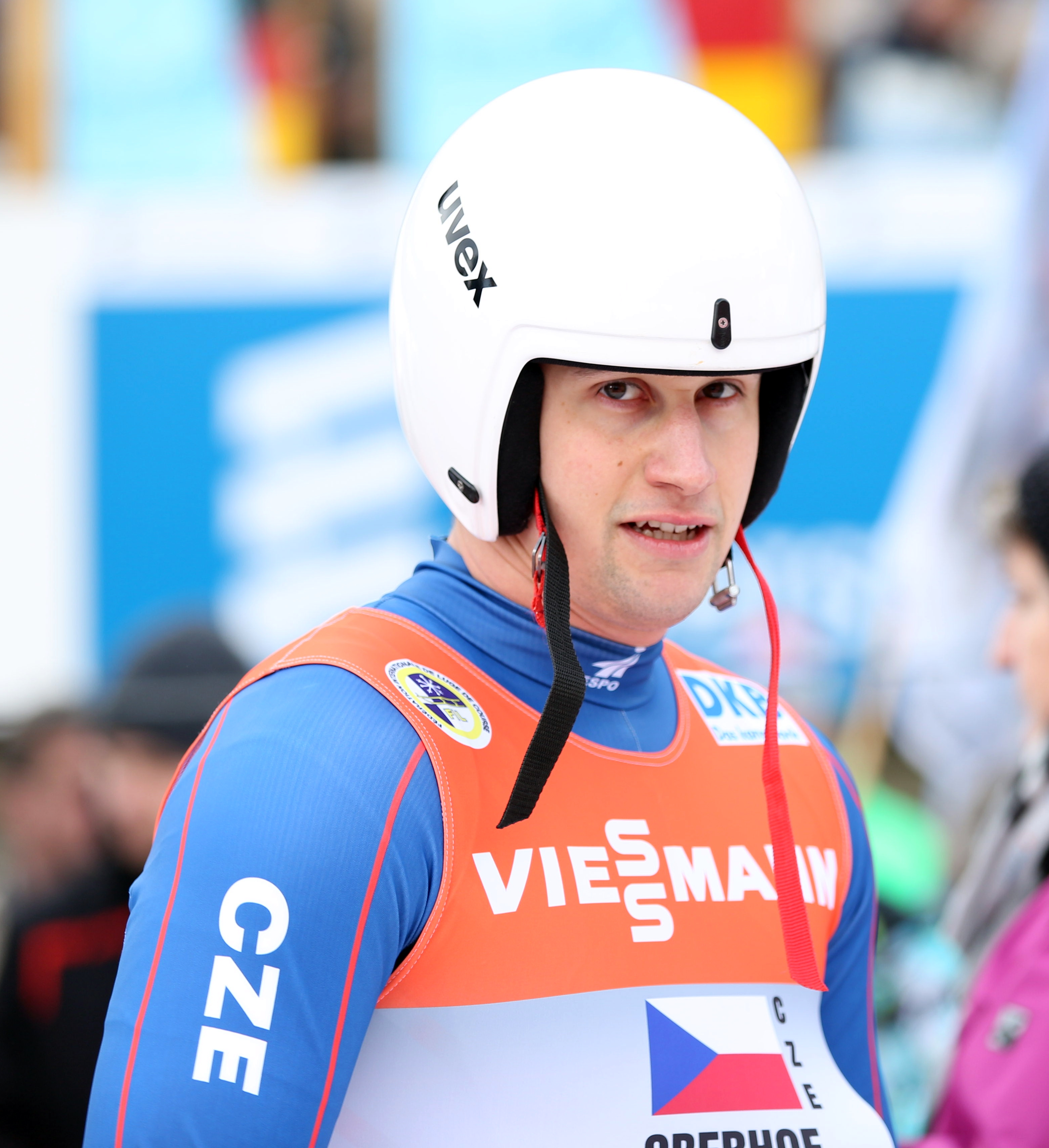
- Hyman in 2017

Personal information
- Born: 25 February 1986 (age 40) Jablonec nad Nisou, Czech Republic
- Height: 189 cm (6 ft 2 in)
- Weight: 85 kg (187 lb)

Sport
- Country: Czech Republic
- Sport: Luge
- Event: Men's singles

Ondřej Hyman (born 25 February 1986 in Jablonec nad Nisou) is a Czech luger who has competed since 1995. His best finish at the FIL World Luge Championships was 29th in the men's singles at Oberhof in 2008.

Hyman also finished 24th in the men's singles event at the FIL European Luge Championships 2010 in Sigulda.

He qualified for the 2010 Winter Olympics where he finished 25th in the men's singles event. Hyman also competed at the 2014, 2018, and 2026 Winter Olympics.
