= Maciej Kurowski =

Polish luger (born 1986)

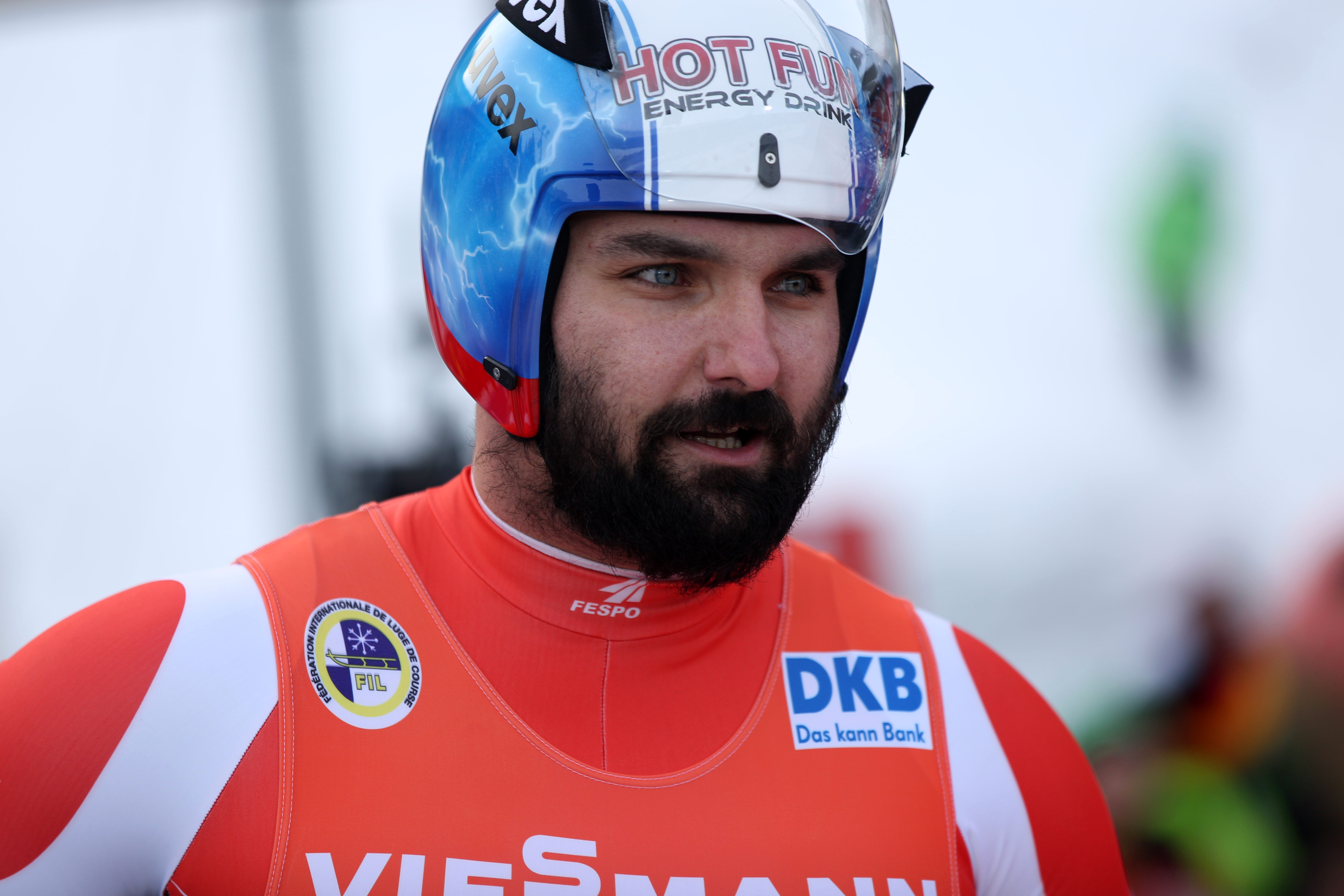
Kurowski at the 2017 luge world cup in Oberhof

Maciej Kurowski (born 19 June 1986 in Jelenia Góra) is a Polish luger who has competed since 2005. His best finish at the FIL World Luge Championships was 29th in the men's singles event at Lake Placid, New York, in 2009.

Kurowski finished 21st in the men's singles event at the FIL European Luge Championships 2010 in Sigulda.

He qualified for the 2010 Winter Olympics where he finished 23rd in the men's singles event.
