= 2012–13 Luge World Cup =

Sport event 2012

Winners
- Men's singles: Felix Loch (GER)
- Doubles: Tobias Wendl / Tobias Arlt (GER)
- Women's singles: Natalie Geisenberger (GER)
- Team relay: Germany

Competitions
- Venues: 9

The 2012–13 Luge World Cup was a multi race series over a season for luge. The season started on 24 November 2012 in Igls, Austria and ended on 24 February 2013 in Sochi, Russia. The World Cup was organised by the FIL and sponsored by Viessmann.

== Calendar ==
Below is the schedule for the 2012/13 season.

Venue	Date	Details
(Austria) Innsbruck	24–25 November 2012	
(Germany) Königssee	1–2 December 2012	no Team Relay event
(Germany) Altenberg	8–9 December 2012	
(Latvia) Sigulda	15–16 December 2012	
(Germany) Königssee	5–6 January 2013	
(Germany) Oberhof	12–13 January 2013	no Team Relay event
(Germany) Winterberg	19–20 January 2013	no Team Relay event
(United States) Lake Placid	8–9 February 2013	
(Russia) Sochi	23–24 February 2013	

== Results ==
=== Men's singles ===
Event:	Gold:	Time	Silver:	Time	Bronze:	Time
Innsbruck	Felix Loch; Germany	1:40.229; 50.098/50.131	David Möller; Germany	1:40.536; 50.294/50.242	Johannes Ludwig; Germany	1:40.600; 50.269/50.331
Königssee	Andi Langenhan; Germany	1:38.679; 49.252/49.427	Felix Loch; Germany	1:38.720; 49.356/49.364	David Möller; Germany	1:38.942; 49.398/49.544
Altenberg	Felix Loch; Germany	1:46.798; 53.395/53.403	Andi Langenhan; Germany	1:47.003; 53.458/53.545	Johannes Ludwig; Germany	1:47.077; 53.429/53.648
Sigulda	Albert Demtschenko; Russia	1:37.605; 48.756/48.849	Armin Zöggeler; Italy	1:37.647; 48.797/48.850	Felix Loch; Germany	1:37.708; 48.632/49.076
Königssee	David Möller; Germany	1:39.526; 49.744/49.782	Albert Demtschenko; Russia	1:39.590; 49.828/49.762	Dominik Fischnaller; Italy	1:39.747; 49.839/49.908
Oberhof	Felix Loch; Germany	1:27.257; 43.512/43.745	Andi Langenhan; Germany	1:27.647; 43.840/43.807	Johannes Ludwig; Germany	1:27.776; 43.863/43.913
Winterberg	David Möller; Germany	1:44.207; 52.160/52.047	Felix Loch; Germany	1:44.216; 52.146/52.070	Armin Zöggeler; Italy	1:44.260; 52.061/52.199
Lake Placid	Armin Zöggeler; Italy	1:44.655; 52.369/52.286	Dominik Fischnaller; Italy	1:44.867; 52.321/52.546	David Mair; Italy	1:45.005; 52.502/52.503
Sochi	Andi Langenhan; Germany	1:47.335; 53.729/53.606	Albert Demtschenko; Russia	1:47.339; 53.686/53.653	David Möller; Germany	1:47.353; 53.807/53.546

=== Doubles ===
Event:	Gold:	Time	Silver:	Time	Bronze:	Time
Innsbruck	Tobias Wendl; Tobias Arlt; Germany	1:19.464; 39.709/39.755	Toni Eggert; Sascha Benecken; Germany	1:19.497; 39.791/39.706	Peter Penz; Georg Fischler; Austria	1:19.569; 39.830/39.739
Königssee	Tobias Wendl; Tobias Arlt; Germany	1:40.977; 50.480/50.497	Toni Eggert; Sascha Benecken; Germany	1:41.392; 50.741/50.651	Andreas Linger; Wolfgang Linger; Austria	1:41.926; 51.032/50.894
Altenberg	Tobias Wendl; Tobias Arlt; Germany	1:22.654; 41.355/41.299	Peter Penz; Georg Fischler; Austria	1:23.018; 41.561/41.457	Toni Eggert; Sascha Benecken; Germany	1:23.218; 41.637/41.581
Sigulda	Tobias Wendl; Tobias Arlt; Germany	1:25.104; 42.601/42.503	Peter Penz; Georg Fischler; Austria	1:25.556; 42.744/42.812	Christian Oberstolz; Patrick Gruber; Italy	1:25.668; 42.856/42.812
Königssee	Tobias Wendl; Tobias Arlt; Germany	1:41.411; 50.681/50.730	Toni Eggert; Sascha Benecken; Germany	1:42.287; 51.198/51.089	Peter Penz; Georg Fischler; Austria	1:42.651; 51.230/51.421
Oberhof	Toni Eggert; Sascha Benecken; Germany	1:23.240; 41.611/41.629	Tobias Wendl; Tobias Arlt; Germany	1:23.262; 41.565/41.697	Peter Penz; Georg Fischler; Austria	1:23.464; 41.707/41.757
Winterberg	Andreas Linger; Wolfgang Linger; Austria	1:26.878; 43.522/43.356	Toni Eggert; Sascha Benecken; Germany	1:26.907; 43.479/43.428	Christian Oberstolz; Patrick Gruber; Italy	1:27.099; 43.538/43.561
Lake Placid	Tobias Wendl; Tobias Arlt; Germany	1:28.256; 44.155/44.101	Peter Penz; Georg Fischler; Austria	1:28.387; 44.168/44.219	Christian Oberstolz; Patrick Gruber; Italy	1:28.557; 44.212/44.345
Sochi	Tobias Wendl; Tobias Arlt; Germany	1:42.087; 50.848/51.239	Peter Penz; Georg Fischler; Austria	1:42.221; 51.115/51.106	Andris Šics; Juris Šics; Latvia	1:42.243; 51.097/51.146

=== Women's singles ===
Event:	Gold:	Time	Silver:	Time	Bronze:	Time
Innsbruck	Anke Wischnewski; Germany	1:19.836; 39.875/39.961	Natalie Geisenberger; Germany	1:19.910; 39.993/39.917	Alex Gough; Canada	1:19.988; 39.983/40.005
Königssee	Natalie Geisenberger; Germany	1:41.450; 50.712/50.738	Tatjana Hüfner; Germany	1:41.481; 50.772/50.709	Alex Gough; Canada	1:41.601; 50.768/50.833
Altenberg	Natalie Geisenberger; Germany	1:44.410; 52.164/52.246	Anke Wischnewski; Germany	1:44.533; 52.328/52.205	Corinna Martini; Germany	1:44.766; 52.485/52.281
Sigulda	Tatiana Ivanova; Russia	1:25.604; 42.818/42.786	Natalie Geisenberger; Germany	1:25.643; 42.994/42.649	Anke Wischnewski; Germany	1:25.887; 42.975/42.912
Königssee	Natalie Geisenberger; Germany	1:42.325; 51.253/51.072	Carina Schwab; Germany	1:42.642; 51.299/51.343	Aileen Frisch; Germany	1:42.710; 51.312/51.398
Oberhof	Natalie Geisenberger; Germany	1:23.597; 41.764/41.833	Tatjana Hüfner; Germany	1:23.784; 41.885/41.899	Anke Wischnewski; Germany	1:23.896; 41.963/41.933
Winterberg	Natalie Geisenberger; Germany	1:52.916; 56.485/56.431	Anke Wischnewski; Germany	1:52.936; 56.466/56.470	Tatjana Hüfner; Germany	1:53.002; 56.565/56.437
Lake Placid	Natalie Geisenberger; Germany	1:28.440; 44.295/44.145	Julia Clukey; United States	1:28.735; 44.383/44.352	Alex Gough; Canada	1:28.748; 44.408/44.340
Sochi	Tatjana Hüfner; Germany	1:41.922; 50.895/51.027	Natalie Geisenberger; Germany	1:41.960; 50.894/51.066	Anke Wischnewski; Germany	1:42.228; 51.048/51.180

=== Team relay ===
Event:	Gold:	Time	Silver:	Time	Bronze:	Time
Innsbruck	Anke Wischnewski; David Möller; Tobias Wendl; Tobias Arlt; Germany	2:08.950; 41.475/43.665/43.810	Alex Gough; Samuel Edney; Tristan Walker; Justin Snith; Canada	2:09.237; 41.561/43.700/43.976	Sandra Gasparini; Dominik Fischnaller; Christian Oberstolz; Patrick Gruber; Italy	2:09.737; 41.767/43.903/44.067
Altenberg	Natalie Geisenberger; Felix Loch; Tobias Wendl; Tobias Arlt; Germany	2:22.962; 46.808/48.035/48.119	Nina Reithmayer; Wolfgang Kindl; Peter Penz; Georg Fischler; Austria	2:23.721; 47.049/48.428/48.244	Tatiana Ivanova; Albert Demtschenko; Vladislav Yuzhakov; Vladimir Makhnutin; Russia	2:23.962; 47.357/48.164/48.441
Sigulda	Natalie Geisenberger; Felix Loch; Tobias Wendl; Tobias Arlt; Germany	2:15.778; 44.248/45.562/45.968	Sandra Gasparini; Armin Zöggeler; Christian Oberstolz; Patrick Gruber; Italy	2:16.327; 44.712/45.578/46.037	Tatiana Ivanova; Albert Demtschenko; Pavel Kuzmich; Boris Kuryschkin; Russia	2:16.843; 44.607/45.836/46.40
Königssee	Natalie Geisenberger; David Möller; Tobias Wendl; Tobias Arlt; Germany	2:43.710; 53.484/55.211/55.015	Alex Gough; Samuel Edney; Tristan Walker; Justin Snith; Canada	2:44.554; 53.399/55.551/55.604	Nina Reithmayer; Daniel Pfister; Peter Penz; Georg Fischler; Austria	2:45.242; 54.085/55.446/55.711
Lake Placid	Natalie Geisenberger; Ralf Palik; Tobias Wendl; Tobias Arlt; Germany	2:34.894; 49.949/52.442/52.503	Julia Clukey; Chris Mazdzer; Matthew Mortensen; Preston Griffall; United States	2:35.001; 50.265/51.982/52.754	Sandra Gasparini; Armin Zöggeler; Christian Oberstolz; Patrick Gruber; Italy	2:35.474; 51.105/51.982/52.387
Sochi	Tatjana Hüfner; Andi Langenhan; Tobias Wendl; Tobias Arlt; Germany	2:51.553; 55.959/57.797/57.797	Tatiana Ivanova; Albert Demtschenko; Vladislav Yuzhakov; Vladimir Makhnutin; Russia	2:51.709; 55.789/57.645/58.275	Alex Gough; Samuel Edney; Tristan Walker; Justin Snith; Canada	2:51.954; 55.962/57.813/58.179

== Standings ==
=== Men's singles ===
Pos.	Luger	IGL	KON	ALT	SIG	KON	OBE	WIN	LKP	SOC	Points
1.	Felix Loch (GER)	1	2	1	3	4	1	2	—	6	650
2.	Andi Langenhan (GER)	4	1	2	5	6	2	6	14	1	613
3.	David Möller (GER)	2	3	8	7	1	5	1	9	3	607
4.	Armin Zöggeler (ITA)	9	5	4	2	7	11	3	1	4	549
5.	Albert Demtschenko (RUS)	8	4	5	1	2	6	9	—	2	516
6.	Johannes Ludwig (GER)	3	8	3	4	9	3	5	13	7	482
7.	Dominik Fischnaller (ITA)	12	6	10	12	3	—	—	2	15	331
8.	David Mair (ITA)	22	12	9	13	12	16	7	3	24	310
9.	Daniel Pfister (AUT)	19	10	12	22	8	17	12	12	8	281
10.	Manuel Pfister (AUT)	6	9	dns	6	14	13	11	17	18	278
11.	Wolfgang Kindl (AUT)	13	29	18	9	16	8	8	10	19	269
12.	Gregory Carigiet (SUI)	24	7	13	18	10	15	13	21	9	267
13.	Chris Mazdzer (USA)	16	15	15	19	22	12	17	5	12	261
14.	Mārtiņš Rubenis (LAT)	17	13	19	8	18	14	29	20	5	257
15.	Inārs Kivlenieks (LAT)	7	20	23	11	19	7	24	22	13	253
16.	Samuel Edney (CAN)	15	14	6	—	13	18	20	6	25	244
17.	Semen Pavlichenko (RUS)	20	18	17	15	24	4	10	—	14	235
18.	Thor Haug Norbech (NOR)	21	31	7	14	dnf	19	14	4	27	228
19.	Jozef Ninis (SVK)	26	17	14	10	15	19	19	15	21	209
20.	Viktor Kneib (RUS)	11	30	20	20	21	9	21	—	10	202

=== Men's doubles ===
Pos.	Luger	IGL	KON	ALT	SIG	KON	OBE	WIN	LKP	SOC	Points
1.	Tobias Wendl / Tobias Arlt (GER)	1	1	1	1	1	2	8	1	1	827
2.	Toni Eggert / Sascha Benecken (GER)	2	2	3	8	2	1	2	7	13	628
3.	Peter Penz / Georg Fischler (AUT)	3	4	2	2	3	3	dns	2	2	610
4.	Andreas Linger / Wolfgang Linger (AUT)	4	3	5	5	7	5	1	5	15	522
5.	Christian Oberstolz / Patrick Gruber (ITA)	5	5	7	3	8	4	3	3	6	518
6.	Andris Šics / Juris Šics (LAT)	9	18	9	4	4	11	5	11	3	414
7.	Ludwig Rieder / Patrick Rastner (ITA)	6	10	8	13	5	8	4	14	5	398
8	Tristan Walker / Justin Snith (CAN)	7	7	6	—	6	dns	9	4	4	351
9.	Hans Peter Fischnaller / Patrick Schwienbacher (ITA)	16	9	11	11	9	9	10	10	9	321
10.	Matthew Mortensen / Preston Griffall (USA)	10	11	13	12	16	17	11	6	17	289
11.	Vladislav Yuzhakov / Vladimir Makhnutin (RUS)	18	dnf	4	10	18	10	6	—	7	274
12.	Antonín Brož / Lukáš Brož (CZE)	11	8	17	14	20	6	12	9	dsq	270
13.	Jake Hyrns / Andrew Sherk (USA)	23	17	12	16	11	19	16	8	11	256
14.	Marek Solcansky / Karol Stuchlak (SVK)	25	12	18	22	12	16	18	17	16	219
15.	Ján Harniš / Branislav Regec (SVK)	15	14	20	dnf	14	13	22	12	18	208
16.	Oskars Gudramovics / Peteris Kalnins (LAT)	14	dnf	22	9	13	12	dnf	15	14	202
17.	Paul Ifrim / Andrei Anghel (ROU)	19	16	19	dnf	19	15	15	13	21	193
18.	Matěj Kvíčala / Jaromir Kudera (CZE)	21	24	14	15	—	18	17	16	22	182
19.	Arthur Petyniak / Adam Wanielista (POL)	30	23	25	21	21	22	24	18	25	161
20.	Pavel Kuzmich / Boris Kuryschkin (RUS)	—	—	—	6	15	14	13	—	—	134

=== Women's singles ===
Pos.	Luger	IGL	KON	ALT	SIG	KON	OBE	WIN	LKP	SOC	Points
1.	Natalie Geisenberger (GER)	2	1	1	2	1	1	1	1	2	855
2.	Anke Wischnewski (GER)	1	4	2	3	5	3	2	4	3	655
3.	Tatjana Hüfner (GER)	4	2	5	4	—	2	3	7	1	561
4.	Alex Gough (CAN)	3	3	4	—	4	5	6	3	6	485
5.	Tatiana Ivanova (RUS)	7	6	6	1	11	11	5	—	4	429
6.	Julia Clukey (USA)	6	21	22	10	6	6	7	2	10	392
7.	Erin Hamlin (USA)	11	11	7	6	10	7	15	5	7	373
8.	Sandra Gasparini (ITA)	15	7	9	8	14	9	8	10	13	328
9.	Nina Reithmayer (AUT)	9	10	8	7	7	8	14	16	20	325
10.	Martina Kocher (SUI)	16	14	14	11	9	12	18	11	16	268
11.	Eliza Tiruma (LAT)	22	dnf	17	12	13	10	10	8	8	262
12.	Aileen Frisch (GER)	5	5	—	—	3	—	—	15	5	261
13.	Arianne Jones (CAN)	8	13	17	—	12	18	11	13	15	241
14.	Kimberley McRae (CAN)	13	dnf	11	—	8	17	9	12	9	240
15.	Ekaterina Baturina (RUS)	14	9	12	14	22	15	12	—	12	236
16.	Alexandra Rodionova (RUS)	17	8	13	9	18	20	19	—	11	235
17.	Mona Wabnigg (AUT)	21	19	20	18	23	16	16	14	21	202
18.	Raluca Strămăturaru (ROU)	19	18	23	24	25	14	17	18	19	193
19.	Birgit Platzer (AUT)	31	17	18	20	20	21	20	17	18	187
20.	Emily Sweeney (USA)	27	12	10	17	19	—	—	9	23	185
20.	Kate Hansen (USA)	23	20	19	29	21	23	dsq	6	17	185
20.	Corinna Martini (GER)	—	—	3	5	—	—	4	—	—	185

=== Team relay ===
Pos.	Luger	IGL	ALT	SIG	KON	LKP	SOC	Points
1.	Germany	1	1	1	1	1	1	600
2.	Italy	3	4	2	6	3	7	381
3.	United States	7	5	5	5	2	5	351
4.	Canada	2	7	—	2	4	3	346
5.	Russia	5	3	3	7	—	2	326
6.	Austria	4	2	dnf	3	6	6	315
7.	Latvia	6	6	4	4	dnf	4	280
8.	Romania	9	9	dns	8	5	11	209
9.	Poland	10	10	6	9	—	10	197
10.	Slovakia	dnf	8	dnf	dnf	7	8	130
11.	Ukraine	dnf	11	dnf	10	—	12	102
12.	Czech Republic	8	—	—	dnf	—	9	81
13.	Kazakhstan	—	12	7	—	—	dnf	78
14.	South Korea	dsq	—	—	—	—	—	0

== See also ==
- FIL World Luge Championships 2013
