= 2011–12 Luge World Cup =

Luge competition at 2011-12

Winners
- Men's singles: Felix Loch (GER)
- Doubles: Andreas Linger / Wolfgang Linger (AUT)
- Women's singles: Tatjana Hüfner (GER)
- Team relay: Germany

Competitions
- Venues: 9

The 2011–12 Luge World Cup was a multi race series over a season for luge. The season started on 26 November 2011 in Igls, Austria and ended on 26 February 2012 in Paramonovo, Russia. The World Cup was organised by the FIL and sponsored by Viessmann.

== Calendar ==
Below is the schedule for the 2011/12 season.

Venue	Date	Details
(Austria) Innsbruck	26–27 November 2011	
(Canada) Whistler	9–10 December 2011	
(Canada) Calgary	16–17 December 2011	
(Germany) Königssee	5–6 January 2012	
(Germany) Oberhof	14–15 January 2012	
(Germany) Winterberg	21–22 January 2012	
(Switzerland) St. Moritz	28–29 January 2012	
(Latvia) Sigulda	18–19 February 2012	
(Russia) Paramonovo	25–26 February 2012	2012 FIL European Championship

== Results ==
=== Men's singles ===
Event:	Gold:	Time	Silver:	Time	Bronze:	Time
Innsbruck	Felix Loch; Germany	1:40.270; 50.145/50.125	David Möller; Germany	1:40.573; 50.244/50.329	Armin Zöggeler; Italy	1:40.627; 50.305/50.322
Whistler	Felix Loch; Germany	1:36.480; 48.263/48.217	Johannes Ludwig; Germany	1:36.758; 48.406/48.352	David Möller; Germany	1:36.778; 48.361/48.417
Calgary	Andi Langenhan; Germany	1:29.406; 44.716/44.690	Felix Loch; Germany	1:29.500; 44.947/44.553	David Möller; Germany	1:29.657; 44.808/44.849
Königssee	Felix Loch; Germany	1:41.651; 50.878/50.773	Armin Zöggeler; Italy	1:41.868; 51.116/50.752	Johannes Ludwig; Germany	1:42.142; 51.218/50.924
Oberhof	Felix Loch; Germany	1:28.042; 43.921/44.121	David Möller; Germany	1:28.251; 44.100/44.151	Andi Langenhan; Germany	1:28.331; 44.152/44.179
Winterberg	Felix Loch; Germany	1:46.981; 53.415/53.566	Ralf Palik; Germany	1:47.219; 53.667/53.552	David Möller; Germany	1:47.240; 53.549/53.691
St. Moritz	Andi Langenhan; Germany	2:12.624; 1:06.494/1:06.130	David Möller; Germany	2:12.746; 1:06.540/1:06.206	Johannes Ludwig; Germany	2:12.910; 1:06.700/1:06.210
Sigulda	Felix Loch; Germany	1:37.501; 48.943/48.558	Armin Zöggeler; Italy	1:37.554; 48.807/48.747	Inārs Kivlenieks; Latvia	1:37.649; 48.921/48.728
Paramonovo	Andi Langenhan; Germany	1:31.876; 45.951/45.925	Armin Zöggeler; Italy	1:31.961; 45.998/45.963	Felix Loch; Germany	1:32.042; 45.956/46.086

=== Doubles ===
Event:	Gold:	Time	Silver:	Time	Bronze:	Time
Innsbruck	Peter Penz; Georg Fischler; Austria	1:19.099; 39.486/39.613	Vladislav Yuzhakov; Vladimir Makhnutin; Russia	1:19.175; 39.543/39.632	Andreas Linger; Wolfgang Linger; Austria	1:19.187; 39.664/39.523
Whistler	Andreas Linger; Wolfgang Linger; Austria	1:22.644; 41.255/41.389	Peter Penz; Georg Fischler; Austria	1:22.888; 41.331/41.557	Christian Oberstolz; Patrick Gruber; Italy	1:22.943; 41.380/41.563
Calgary	Tobias Wendl; Tobias Arlt; Germany	1:27.661; 43.795/43.866	Andreas Linger; Wolfgang Linger; Austria	1:27.693; 43.831/43.862	Toni Eggert; Sascha Benecken; Germany	1:27.829; 43.912/43.917
Königssee	Tobias Wendl; Tobias Arlt; Germany	1:41.172; 50.498/50.674	Andreas Linger; Wolfgang Linger; Austria	1:41.406; 50.515/50.891	Toni Eggert; Sascha Benecken; Germany	1:41.829; 50.958/50.871
Oberhof	Toni Eggert; Sascha Benecken; Germany	1:23.544; 41.765/41.779	Tobias Wendl; Tobias Arlt; Germany	1:23.775; 41.824/41.951	Andreas Linger; Wolfgang Linger; Austria	1:24.199; 42.068/42.131
Winterberg	Tobias Wendl; Tobias Arlt; Germany	1:27.979; 43.834/44.145	Christian Oberstolz; Patrick Gruber; Italy	1:28.156; 43.908/44.248	Andreas Linger; Wolfgang Linger; Austria	1:28.272; 43.867/44.405
St. Moritz	Andreas Linger; Wolfgang Linger; Austria	1:46.691; 53.382/53.309	Toni Eggert; Sascha Benecken; Germany	1:46.731; 53.483/53.248	Tobias Wendl; Tobias Arlt; Germany	1:46.85; 53.466/53.384
Sigulda	Andreas Linger; Wolfgang Linger; Austria	1:24.722; 42.373/42.349	Christian Oberstolz; Patrick Gruber; Italy	1:24.961; 42.507/42.454	Tobias Wendl; Tobias Arlt; Germany	1:25.091; 42.567/42.524
Paramonovo	Peter Penz; Georg Fischler; Austria	1:31.688; 45.876/45.812	Tobias Wendl; Tobias Arlt; Germany	1:31.837; 45.893/45.944	Toni Eggert; Sascha Benecken; Germany	1:31.952; 45.961/45.991

=== Women's singles ===
Event:	Gold:	Time	Silver:	Time	Bronze:	Time
Innsbruck	Tatjana Hüfner; Germany	1:19.353; 39.717/39.636	Anke Wischnewski; Germany	1:19.554; 39.735/39.819	Alex Gough; Canada	1:19.628; 39.861/39.767
Whistler	Natalie Geisenberger; Germany	1:23.439; 41.748/41.691	Tatjana Hüfner; Germany	1:23.482; 41.700/41.782	Tatiana Ivanova; Russia	1:23.606; 41.796/41.810
Calgary	Alex Gough; Canada	1:34.212; 47.153/47.059	Tatjana Hüfner; Germany	1:34.324; 47.176/47.148	Tatiana Ivanova; Russia	1:34.724; 47.290/47.434
Königssee	Tatjana Hüfner; Germany	1:41.900; 51.076/50.824	Natalie Geisenberger; Germany	1:42.074; 50.860/51.214	Alex Gough; Canada	1:42.630; 51.431/51.199
Oberhof	Natalie Geisenberger; Germany	1:24.443; 42.393/42.050	Tatjana Hüfner; Germany	1:24.690; 42.639/42.051	Anke Wischnewski; Germany	1:25.107; 42.681/42.426
Winterberg	Corinna Martini; Germany	1:54.543; 57.276/57.267	Tatjana Hüfner; Germany	1:54.710; 57.495/57.215	Natalie Geisenberger; Germany	1:54.857; 57.482/57.375
St. Moritz	Tatjana Hüfner; Germany	1:46.933; 53.435/53.498	Natalie Geisenberger; Germany	1:47.800; 53.968/53.832	Anke Wischnewski; Germany	1:47.998; 54.014/53.984
Sigulda	Natalie Geisenberger; Germany	1:25.884; 42.790/43.094	Anke Wischnewski; Germany	1:26.027; 42.913/43.114	Erin Hamlin; United States	1:26.167; 42.957/43.210
Paramonovo	Tatiana Ivanova; Russia	1:32.262; 46.153/46.109	Tatjana Hüfner; Germany	1:32.497; 46.377/46.120	Corinna Martini; Germany	1:32.509; 46.399/46.110

=== Team relay ===
Event:	Gold:	Time	Silver:	Time	Bronze:	Time
Innsbruck	Alex Gough; Samuel Edney; Tristan Walker; Justin Snith; Canada	2:08.774; 41.302/43.575/43.897	Tatjana Hüfner; Andi Langenhan; Tobias Arlt; Tobias Wendl; Germany	2:08.991; 41.190/43.695/44.106	Tatiana Ivanova; Albert Demtschenko; Vladislav Yuzhakov; Vladimir Makhnutin; Russia	2:09.427; 41.575/43.920/43.932
Whistler	Natalie Geisenberger; Felix Loch; Ronny Pietrasik; Christian Weise; Germany	2:18.773; 45.026/46.717/47.030	Alex Gough; Samuel Edney; Tristan Walker; Justin Snith; Canada	2:19.001; 45.073/46.681/47.247	Tatiana Ivanova; Albert Demtschenko; Vladislav Yuzhakov; Vladimir Makhnutin; Russia	2:19.162; 45.130/46.822/47.210
Königssee	Sandra Gasparini; Dominik Fischnaller; Christian Oberstolz; Patrick Gruber; Italy	2:51.375; 56.115/57.860/57.400	Tatjana Hüfner; Felix Loch; Tobias Arlt; Tobias Wendl; Germany	2:51.531; 55.902/57.674/57.955	Tatiana Ivanova; Albert Demtschenko; Vladislav Yuzhakov; Vladimir Makhnutin; Russia	2:51.776; 55.681/58.010/58.085
Oberhof	Natalie Geisenberger; Felix Loch; Toni Eggert; Sascha Benecken; Germany	2:24.768; 46.704/48.786/49.278	Sandra Gasparini; David Mair; Christian Oberstolz; Patrick Gruber; Italy	2:26.061; 47.464/49.203/49.394	Alexandra Rodionova; Viktor Kneib; Vladislav Yuzhakov; Vladimir Makhnutin; Russia	2:26.142; 47.349/49.384/49.409
Winterberg	Anke Wischnewski; Felix Loch; Tobias Arlt; Tobias Wendl; Germany	2:26.956; 47.988/49.395/49.573	Erin Hamlin; Chris Mazdzer; Christian Niccum; Jayson Terdiman; United States	2:27.658; 47.997/49.608/50.053	Maija Tīruma; Inārs Kivlenieks; Andris Šics; Juris Šics; Latvia	2:27.998; 48.374/49.778/49.846
Sigulda	Sandra Gasparini; Armin Zöggeler; Christian Oberstolz; Patrick Gruber; Italy	2:17.137; 45.007/45.921/46.209	Nina Reithmayer; Manuel Pfister; Andreas Linger; Wolfgang Linger; Austria	2:17.483; 45.072/46.187/46.224	Natalie Geisenberger; Felix Loch; Tobias Arlt; Tobias Wendl; Germany	2:17.662; 44.850/46.168/46.644

== Standings ==
=== Men's singles ===
Pos.	Luger	IGL	WHI	CAL	KON	OBE	WIN	SMO	SIG	PAR	Points
1.	Felix Loch (GER)	1	1	2	1	1	1	4	1	3	815
2.	Andi Langenhan (GER)	6	4	1	19	3	4	1	5	1	617
3.	David Möller (GER)	2	3	3	4	2	3	2	12	5	612
4.	Armin Zöggeler (ITA)	3	13	4	2	4	18	6	2	2	548
5.	Johannes Ludwig (GER)	4	2	6	3	7	5	3	4	11	530
6.	Ralf Palik (GER)	dnf	6	11	9	5	2	7	23	9	366
7.	Manuel Pfister (AUT)	7	11	5	17	16	7	10	6	7	362
8.	Albert Demtschenko (RUS)	5	8	30	7	8	8	9	—	4	337
9.	Dominik Fischnaller (ITA)	12	18	7	11	9	6	8	—	6	316
10.	Daniel Pfister (AUT)	9	9	8	13	13	17	13	11	13	298
11.	Reinhard Egger (AUT)	8	14	17	8	10	11	14	16	20	280
12.	David Mair (ITA)	15	16	14	5	23	15	19	15	8	268
13.	Gregory Carigiet (SUI)	14	21	15	12	21	16	5	19	12	260
14.	Stepan Fedorov (RUS)	11	7	18	29	20	13	16	7	19	259
15.	Wolfgang Kindl (AUT)	10	15	12	22	12	10	12	8	—	255
16.	Viktor Kneib (RUS)	13	10	10	18	6	9	15	—	—	240
17.	Samuel Edney (CAN)	16	5	9	15	15	12	—	13	—	233
18.	Inārs Kivlenieks (LAT)	20	12	—	10	11	20	—	3	—	214
19.	Jo Alexander Koppang (NOR)	21	17	23	6	26	22	11	17	—	204
20.	Evgeniy Voskresenskiy (RUS)	29	31	16	27	17	19	18	14	10	194

=== Doubles ===
Pos.	Luger	IGL	WHI	CAL	KON	OBE	WIN	SMO	SIG	PAR	Points
1.	Andreas Linger / Wolfgang Linger (AUT)	3	1	2	2	3	3	1	1	6	730
2.	Tobias Wendl / Tobias Arlt (GER)	4	6	1	1	2	1	3	3	2	720
3.	Toni Eggert / Sascha Benecken (GER)	5	5	3	3	1	4	2	4	3	630
4.	Peter Penz / Georg Fischler (AUT)	1	2	15	4	4	dnf	5	18	1	509
5.	Christian Oberstolz / Patrick Gruber (ITA)	10	3	7	dnf	5	2	4	2	4	497
6.	Vladislav Yuzhakov / Vladimir Makhnutin (RUS)	2	8	12	5	16	6	8	—	5	386
7.	Christian Niccum / Jayson Terdiman (USA)	6	dsq	8	9	8	5	6	7	13	354
8.	Ivan Nevmerzhitski / Vladimir Prokhorov (RUS)	7	7	14	6	12	9	9	—	16	305
9.	Matthew Mortensen / Preston Griffall (USA)	11	12	5	dnf	6	18	14	16	8	289
10.	Tristan Walker / Justin Snith (CAN)	9	10	6	8	18	15	—	15	9	281
11.	Hans Peter Fischnaller / Patrick Schwienbacher (ITA)	14	11	9	dnf	10	8	13	12	11	275
12.	Ludwig Rieder / Patrick Rastner (ITA)	8	13	10	7	dnf	12	7	8	—	274
13.	Antonín Brož / Lukáš Brož (CZE)	12	16	—	10	11	25	11	11	10	247
14.	Ronny Pietrasik / Christian Weise (GER)	15	4	4	dnf	7	—	10	—	—	228
15.	Paul Ifrim / Andrei Anghel (ROU)	19	14	13	14	24	11	—	17	20	204
16.	Andris Šics / Juris Šics (LAT)	13	—	—	—	13	7	—	6	7	202
17.	Ján Harniš / Branislav Regec (SVK)	16	—	18	13	14	22	—	14	12	185
18.	Marek Solcansky / Karol Stuchlak (SVK)	20	—	16	12	15	14	—	19	15	180
19.	Andrejs Berze / Uldis Logins (LAT)	18	15	—	11	21	dnf	—	10	18	162
19.	Mikhail Kuzmich / Stanislav Mikheev (RUS)	17	9	11	15	9	—	—	—	—	162

=== Women's singles ===
Pos.	Luger	IGL	WHI	CAL	KON	OBE	WIN	SMO	SIG	PAR	Points
1.	Tatjana Hüfner (GER)	1	2	2	1	2	2	1	10	2	761
2.	Natalie Geisenberger (GER)	4	1	6	2	1	3	2	1	4	710
3.	Anke Wischnewski (GER)	2	5	5	5	3	4	3	2	7	581
4.	Corinna Martini (GER)	5	8	4	4	5	1	4	7	3	548
5.	Alex Gough (CAN)	3	4	1	3	4	5	—	9	5	509
6.	Erin Hamlin (USA)	7	6	16	11	6	7	6	3	6	421
7.	Tatiana Ivanova (RUS)	6	3	3	6	dnf	—	11	—	1	374
8.	Nina Reithmayer (AUT)	10	7	9	12	9	8	10	5	11	359
9.	Sandra Gasparini (ITA)	9	14	13	8	20	11	7	6	8	332
10.	Martina Kocher (SUI)	11	13	10	10	15	10	5	12	12	317
11.	Arianne Jones (CAN)	8	10	22	7	16	6	—	8	13	290
12.	Alexandra Rodionova (RUS)	16	15	11	9	7	20	8	—	15	259
13.	Natalia Khoreva (RUS)	17	12	14	14	14	29	9	14	9	258
14.	Eliza Tiruma (LAT)	18	21	—	15	12	18	—	4	17	208
15.	Kimberley McRae (CAN)	12	11	7	13	19	9	—	—	—	203
16.	Mona Wabnigg (AUT)	14	9	17	18	22	16	13	—	—	188
17.	Ewa Kuls (POL)	27	18	15	22	25	26	12	17	—	169
18.	Raluca Strămăturaru (ROU)	20	20	21	27	26	23	—	15	14	163
19.	Dayna Clay (CAN)	19	16	8	19	21	15	—	—	—	157
20.	Ekaterina Baturina (RUS)	23	—	18	17	10	28	—	—	10	150

=== Team relay ===
Pos.	Luger	IGL	WHI	KON	OBE	WIN	SIG	Points
1.	Germany	2	1	2	1	1	3	540
2.	Canada	1	2	6	4	8	5	392
3.	Russia	3	3	3	3	5	6	385
4.	Austria	4	4	4	6	4	2	375
5.	United States	6	6	5	5	2	4	355
6.	Italy	dsq	5	1	2	dnf	1	340
7.	Latvia	5	8	7	7	3	7	305
8.	Romania	8	7	dnf	9	6	9	216
9.	Slovakia	7	—	9	8	7	8	215
10.	Poland	9	—	10	10	10	10	183
11.	Ukraine	10	—	dsq	—	9	—	75
12.	South Korea	11	—	—	—	—	11	68
13.	Switzerland	dnf	—	8	—	—	—	42
14.	Czech Republic	—	—	11	—	—	—	34

== See also ==
- FIL World Luge Championships 2012
