= 2010–11 Luge World Cup =

Multi race world cup tournament

Winners
- Men's singles: Armin Zöggeler (ITA)
- Doubles: Tobias Wendl / Tobias Arlt (GER)
- Women's singles: Tatjana Hüfner (GER)
- Team relay: Germany

Competitions
- Venues: 9

The 2010–11 Luge World Cup was a multi race tournament over a season for luge. The season started on 27 November 2010 in Igls, Austria and ended on 20 February 2011 in Sigulda, Latvia. The World Cup was organised by the FIL and sponsored by Viessmann.

== Calendar ==
Below is the schedule for the 2010/11 season.

Venue	Date	Details
(Austria) Insbruck	27–28 November 2010	
(Germany) Winterberg	4–5 December 2010	
(Canada) Calgary	10–11 December 2010	
(United States) Park City	17–18 December 2010	
(Germany) Königssee	5–6 January 2011	
(Germany) Oberhof	15–16 January 2011	
(Germany) Altenberg	22–23 January 2011	
(Russia) Paramonovo	12–13 February 2011	
(Latvia) Sigulda	19–20 February 2011	

== Results ==
=== Men's singles ===
Event:	Gold:	Time	Silver:	Time	Bronze:	Time
Innsbruck	Felix Loch; Germany	1:40.398; 50.199/50.199	David Möller; Germany	1:40.444; 50.259/50.185	Armin Zöggeler; Italy	1:40.560; 50.286/50.274
Winterberg	Armin Zöggeler; Italy	1:44.322; 52.183/52.139	David Möller; Germany	1:44.541; 52.256/52.285	Julian von Schleinitz; Germany	1:44.601; 52.281/52.320
Calgary	Armin Zöggeler; Italy	1:29.651; 44.741/44.910	Viktor Kneib; Russia	1:29.912; 44.867/45.045	Felix Loch; Germany	1:29.962; 44.952/45.010
Park City	Armin Zöggeler; Italy	1:30.740; 45.301/45.439	Andi Langenhan; Germany	1:30.992; 45.502/45.490	Viktor Kneib; Russia	1:31.097; 45.510/45.587
Königssee	Armin Zöggeler; Italy	1:41.259; 50.494/50.765	Albert Demtschenko; Russia	1:41.616; 50.848/50.768	Reinhold Rainer; Italy	1:41.668; 50.718/50.950
Oberhof	Felix Loch; Germany	1:30.883; 45.543/45.340	Andi Langenhan; Germany	1:31.115; 45.523/45.592	David Möller; Germany	1:31.326; 45.821/45.505
Altenberg	Felix Loch; Germany	1:50.725; 55.090/55.635	Armin Zöggeler; Italy	1:50.866; 55.321/55.545	Albert Demtschenko; Russia	1:50.915; 55.356/55.559
Paramonovo	Albert Demtschenko; Russia	1:41.116; 50.420/50.696	Felix Loch; Germany	1:41.584; 51.006/50.578	Andi Langenhan; Germany	1:41.738; 50.821/50.917
Sigulda	Armin Zöggeler; Italy	1:36.998; 48.490/48.508	Albert Demtschenko; Russia	1:37.289; 43.814/43.922	Mārtiņš Rubenis; Latvia	1:37.465; 48.681/48.784

=== Doubles ===
Event:	Gold:	Time	Silver:	Time	Bronze:	Time
Innsbruck	Andreas Linger; Wolfgang Linger; Austria	1:18.946; 39.457/39.489	Christian Oberstolz; Patrick Gruber; Italy	1:19.127; 39.594/39.533	Peter Penz; Georg Fischler; Austria	1:19.142; 39.622/39.520
Winterberg	Tobias Wendl; Tobias Arlt; Germany	1:26.832; 43.415/43.417	Christian Oberstolz; Patrick Gruber; Italy	1:26.842; 43.412/43.430	Christian Niccum; Jayson Terdiman; United States	1:27.159; 43.657/43.502
Calgary	Tobias Wendl; Tobias Arlt; Germany	1:28.099; 43.981/44.118	Christian Oberstolz; Patrick Gruber; Italy	1:28.172; 44.002/44.170	Hans Peter Fischnaller; Patrick Schwienbacher; Italy	1:28.394; 44.092/44.302
Park City	Andreas Linger; Wolfgang Linger; Austria; Peter Penz; Georg Fischler; Austria	1:27.331; 43.710/43.621; 1:27.331; 43.656/43.675			Tobias Wendl; Tobias Arlt; Germany	1:27.474; 43.790/43.684
Königssee	Tobias Wendl; Tobias Arlt; Germany	1:41.362; 50.678/50.684	Christian Oberstolz; Patrick Gruber; Italy	1:41.448; 50.720/50.728	Andreas Linger; Wolfgang Linger; Austria	1:41.607; 50.863/50.744
Oberhof	Tobias Wendl; Tobias Arlt; Germany	1:26.794; 43.386/43.408	Christian Oberstolz; Patrick Gruber; Italy	1:26.833; 43.355/43.478	Toni Eggert; Sascha Benecken; Germany	1:26.988; 43.624/43.364
Altenberg	Andreas Linger; Wolfgang Linger; Austria	1:24.076; 42.062/42.014v	Tobias Wendl; Tobias Arlt; Germany	1:24.352; 42.184/42.168	Toni Eggert; Sascha Benecken; Germany	1:24.514; 42.294/42.220
Paramonovo	Andreas Linger; Wolfgang Linger; Austria	1:33.189; 46.692/46.497	Tobias Wendl; Tobias Arlt; Germany	1:33.393; 46.666/46.727v	Andris Šics; Juris Šics; Latvia	1:33.450; 46.760/46.690
Sigulda	Andreas Linger; Wolfgang Linger; Austria	1:24.209; 42.209/42.000v	Christian Oberstolz; Patrick Gruber; Italy	1:24.637; 42.387/42.250v	Toni Eggert; Sascha Benecken; Germany	1:24.712; 42.367/42.345

=== Women's singles ===
Event:	Gold:	Time	Silver:	Time	Bronze:	Time
Innsbruck	Tatjana Hüfner; Germany	1:19.594; 39.851/39.743	Natalie Geisenberger; Germany	1:19.802; 39.996/39.806	Erin Hamlin; United States	1:19.974; 40.031/39.943
Winterberg	Tatjana Hüfner; Germany	1:54.669; 57.654/57.015	Natalie Geisenberger; Germany	1:55.283; 57.854/57.429	Alex Gough; Canada	1:55.411; 57.859/57.552
Calgary	Tatjana Hüfner; Germany	1:33.658; 46.814/46.844	Anke Wischnewski; Germany	1:33.801; 46.912/46.889	Erin Hamlin; United States	1:33.955; 46.969/46.986
Park City	Tatjana Hüfner; Germany	1:27.075; 43.602/43.473	Anke Wischnewski; Germany	1:27.159; 43.650/43.509	Alex Gough; Canada	1:27.346; 43.718/43.628
Königssee	Natalie Geisenberger; Germany	1:41.756; 50.896/50.860	Tatjana Hüfner; Germany	1:41.776; 50.978/50.798	Alex Gough; Canada	1:42.215; 51.065/51.150
Oberhof	Tatjana Hüfner; Germany	1:26.366; 43.239/43.127	Natalie Geisenberger; Germany	1:26.775; 43.491/43.284	Anke Wischnewski; Germany	1:27.298; 43.677/43.621
Altenberg	Tatjana Hüfner; Germany	1:45.626; 53.015/52.611	Natalie Geisenberger; Germany	1:45.648; 52.861/52.787	Anke Wischnewski; Germany	1:46.270; 53.253/53.017
Paramonovo	Alex Gough; Canada	1:33.536; 46.782/46.754	Carina Schwab; Germany	1:33.914; 46.939/46.975	Natalie Geisenberger; Germany	1:33.935; 47.095/46.840
Sigulda	Tatjana Hüfner; Germany	1:24.679; 42.405/42.274	Tatiana Ivanova; Russia	1:24.692; 42.354/42.338	Anke Wischnewski; Germany	1:25.187; 42.659/42.528

=== Team relay ===
Event:	Gold:	Time	Silver:	Time	Bronze:	Time
Innsbruck	Tatjana Hüfner; Andi Langenhan; Tobias Arlt; Tobias Wendl; Germany	2:09.519; 41.024/44.229/44.266	Alex Gough; Samuel Edney; Tristan Walker; Justin Snith; Canada	2:10.340; 41.307/44.394/44.639	Sandra Gasparini; Armin Zoeggeler; Christian Oberstolz; Patrick Gruber; Italy	2:10.431; 41.573/44.472/44.386
Winterberg	Tatjana Hüfner; David Möller; Tobias Arlt; Tobias Wendl; Germany	2:26.594; 47.291/49.561/49.561	Sandra Gasparini; David Mair; Christian Oberstolz; Patrick Gruber; Italy	2:27.037; 47.729/49.722/49.586	Nina Reithmayer; Manuel Pfister; Andreas Linger; Wolfgang Linger; Austria	2:27.152; 47.877/49.633/49.642
Königssee	Natalie Geisenberger; Jan-Armin Eichhorn; Tobias Arlt; Tobias Wendl; Germany	2:45.971; 53.646/56.147 /56.178	Nina Reithmayer; Daniel Pfister; Andreas Linger; Wolfgang Linger; Austria	2:46.179; 54.100/56.109/55.970	Sandra Gasparini; Armin Zoeggeler; Christian Oberstolz; Patrick Gruber; Italy	2:46.520; 54.604/55.882/56.034
Oberhof	Tatjana Hüfner; Felix Loch; Tobias Wendl; Tobias Arlt; Germany	2:27.306; 47.906/49.468/49.932	Tatiana Ivanova; Viktor Kneib; Vladislav Yuzhakov; Vladimir Makhnutin; Russia	2:28.714; 48.785/49.837/50.092	Sandra Gasparini; David Mair; Christian Oberstolz; Patrick Gruber; Italy	2:29.047; 49.153/49.962/49.932
Altenberg	Tatjana Hüfner; Felix Loch; Tobias Wendl; Tobias Arlt; Germany	2:25.216; 47.434/48.724/49.058	Tatiana Ivanova; Albert Demtschenko; Vladislav Yuzhakov; Vladimir Makhnutin; Russia	2:25.746; 47.912/48.685/49.149	Nina Reithmayer; Daniel Pfister; Peter Penz; Georg Fischler; Austria	2:25.941; 47.823/49.161/48.957
Sigulda	Tatiana Ivanova; Albert Demtschenko; Vladislav Yuzhakov; Vladimir Makhnutin; Russia	2:15.660; 43.915/45.668/46.077	Sandra Gasparini; Armin Zoeggeler; Christian Oberstolz; Patrick Gruber; Italy	2:16.417; 44.736/45.633/46.048	Tatjana Hüfner; Jan-Armin Eichhorn; Toni Eggert; Sascha Benecken; Germany	2:16.626; 43.764/45.969/46.893

== Standings ==
=== Men's singles ===
Pos.	Luger	IGL	WIN	CAL	PKC	KON	OBE	ALT	PAR	SIG	Points
1.	Armin Zöggeler (ITA)	3	1	1	1	1	5	2	5	1	765
2.	Felix Loch (GER)	1	4	3	4	5	1	1	2	14	658
3.	Albert Demtschenko (RUS)	16	7	10	20	2	7	3	1	2	514
4.	David Möller (GER)	2	2	4	11	4	3	7	15	11	500
5.	Andi Langenhan (GER)	5	11	8	2	8	2	9	3	10	488
6.	Viktor Kneib (RUS)	9	8	2	3	6	6	16	4	4	481
7.	Jan-Armin Eichhorn (GER)	7	13	6	7	7	4	4	7	7	430
8.	Daniel Pfister (AUT)	10	14	14	6	dnf	8	8	6	6	326
9.	David Mair (ITA)	28	12	13	10	9	15	5	12	8	305
10.	Reinhold Rainer (ITA)	13	20	12	8	3	14	10	dns	9	298
11.	Manuel Pfister (AUT)	11	6	5	18	dnf	12	12	8	16	293
12.	Gregory Carigiet (SUI)	8	15	9	12	12	17	13	9	21	284
13.	Reinhard Egger (AUT)	4	5	26	15	11	11	18	22	25	282
14.	Wolfgang Kindl (AUT)	6	9	7	5	10	16	27	—	—	265
15.	Dominik Fischnaller (ITA)	12	10	15	13	13	9	—	—	5	248
16.	Jeff Christie (CAN)	22	22	18	23	15	23	11	13	26	202
17.	Evgeniy Voskresenskiy (RUS)	30	18	23	14	dnf	22	19	11	18	178
18.	Maciej Kurowski (POL)	27	23	16	17	21	28	26	16	22	173
18.	Bengt Walden (USA)	15	21	20	19	—	18	23	20	19	173
20.	Samuel Edney (CAN)	17	26	11	24	17	10	20	—	—	171
29.	Mārtiņš Rubenis (LAT)	26	26	—	—	—	—	—	—	3	101
32.	Julian von Schleinitz (GER)	—	3	—	—	—	31	—	—	—	80

=== Doubles ===
Pos.	Luger	IGL	WIN	CAL	PKC	KON	OBE	ALT	PAR	SIG	Points
1.	Tobias Wendl / Tobias Arlt (GER)	4	1	1	3	1	1	2	2	7	746
2.	Andreas Linger / Wolfgang Linger (AUT)	1	20	5	1	3	7	1	1	1	692
3.	Christian Oberstolz / Patrick Gruber (ITA)	2	2	2	4	2	2	5	7	2	671
4.	Toni Eggert / Sascha Benecken (GER)	6	4	6	10	6	3	3	4	3	516
5.	Peter Penz / Georg Fischler (AUT)	3	6	4	1	5	8	6	8	—	469
6.	Hans Peter Fischnaller / Patrick Schwienbacher (ITA)	7	7	3	8	4	9	9	5	11	431
7.	Andris Šics / Juris Šics (LAT)	7	9	7	7	10	19	7	3	5	406
8.	Vladislav Yuzhakov / Vladimir Makhnutin (RUS)	13	12	16	11	11	5	4	6	4	380
9.	Mikhail Kuzmich / Stanislav Mikheev (RUS)	12	5	9	12	12	10	13	10	8	334
10.	Christian Niccum / Jayson Terdiman (USA)	5	3	8	6	8	15	8	—	—	327
11.	Matthew Mortensen / Preston Griffall (USA)	9	11	10	5	14	11	16	12	10	319
12.	Tristan Walker / Justin Snith (CAN)	11	15	11	14	17	14	10	11	14	272
13.	Ludwig Rieder / Patrick Rastner (ITA)	10	8	12	9	7	20	—	—	—	216
14.	Antonín Brož / Lukáš Brož (CZE)	16	14	—	—	13	13	11	—	12	179
15.	Oskars Gudramovičs / Pēteris Kalniņš (LAT)	18	27	—	—	9	12	23	—	6	178
16.	Ivan Nevmerzhitski / Vladimir Prokhorov (RUS)	—	—	—	—	—	6	12	9	9	160
17.	Andrejs Berze / Uldis Logins (LAT)	19	16	—	—	19	16	15	—	16	145
18.	Ján Harniš / Branislav Regec (SVK)	dns	22	—	—	15	25	18	13	13	144
19.	Marek Solcansky / Karol Stuchlak (SVK)	20	17	—	—	21	17	17	—	17	136
20.	Paul Ifrim / Andrei Anghel (ROU)	15	18	—	—	22	21	22	—	15	133

=== Women's singles ===
Pos.	Luger	IGL	WIN	CAL	PKC	KON	OBE	ALT	PAR	SIG	Points
1.	Tatjana Hüfner (GER)	1	1	1	1	2	1	1	4	1	845
2.	Natalie Geisenberger (GER)	2	2	4	4	1	2	2	3	6	680
3.	Anke Wischnewski (GER)	4	4	2	2	5	3	3	6	3	605
4.	Alex Gough (CAN)	21	3	7	3	3	13	4	1	4	526
5.	Carina Schwab (GER)	7	5	9	7	4	4	8	2	13	463
6.	Tatiana Ivanova (RUS)	10	7	8	11	7	5	7	5	2	445
7.	Nina Reithmayer (AUT)	23	9	11	6	6	14	5	7	5	375
8.	Erin Hamlin (USA)	3	6	3	10	21	15	19	13	15	350
9.	Martina Kocher (SUI)	14	8	10	12	10	6	10	11	11	328
10.	Alexandra Rodionova (RUS)	12	13	5	20	11	11	17	8	10	308
11.	Sandra Gasparini (ITA)	6	18	13	9	15	9	9	16	17	295
11.	Ashley Walden (USA)	5	12	19	8	12	10	21	14	14	295
13.	Maija Tīruma (LAT)	9	16	16	13	dnf	8	11	10	7	277
14.	Julia Clukey (USA)	11	14	17	5	16	7	15	15	—	264
15.	Arianne Jones (CAN)	15	11	12	14	14	18	12	9	20	263
16.	Veronika Halder (AUT)	8	10	6	dsq	9	21	6	18	dns	260
17.	Ewelina Staszulonek (POL)	13	15	14	15	8	12	18	dsq	8	249
18.	Ksenia Tsyplakova (RUS)	26	19	15	17	18	19	14	12	9	231
19.	Raluca Strămăturaru (ROU)	16	23	22	19	25	25	20	—	26	152
20.	Natalia Khoreva (RUS)	20	17	20	16	dsq	16	26	—	—	131

=== Team relay ===
Pos.	Team	IGL	WIN	KON	OBE	ALT	SIG	Points
1.	Germany	1	1	1	1	1	3	570
2.	Italy	3	2	3	3	4	2	440
3.	Russia	4	7	6	2	2	1	426
4.	Austria	7	2	2	5	3	6	376
5.	United States	6	4	4	4	6	4	340
6.	Canada	2	6	5	7	dsq	8	278
7.	Slovakia	9	8	7	8	7	5	270
8.	Poland	11	11	8	11	9	7	229
9.	Latvia	5	5	dnf	6	5	dsq	215
10.	Romania	10	9	9	10	8	dsq	192
11.	Ukraine	12	10	—	9	—	—	107
12.	Switzerland	8	—	—	—	—	—	42
13.	Czech Republic	—	—	—	—	—	9	39

== See also ==
FIL World Luge Championships 2011
