= FIL World Luge Championships 2012 =

The FIL World Luge Championships 2012 was held on February 10–12, 2012, under the auspices of the International Luge Federation at the bobsleigh, luge, and skeleton track in Altenberg, Germany for the second time after having hosted the World championships in 1996. The facility was chosen at the 56th FIL Congress in Calgary, Alberta, Canada on June 28, 2008

== Medalists ==
Event	Gold	Silver	Bronze
Men's singles	Felix Loch; Germany	Albert Demtschenko; Russia	Armin Zöggeler; Italy
Women's singles	Tatjana Hüfner; Germany}	Tatiana Ivanova; Russia	Natalie Geisenberger; Germany
Doubles	Austria; Andreas Linger; Wolfgang Linger	Germany; Toni Eggert; Sascha Benecken	Austria; Peter Penz; Georg Fischler
Team relay	Germany; Tatjana Hüfner; Felix Loch; Toni Eggert; Sascha Benecken	Russia; Tatiana Ivanova; Albert Demtschenko; Vladislav Yuzhakov; Vladimir Makhnutin	Canada; Alex Gough; Samuel Edney; Tristan Walker; Justin Snith

== Medal table ==
Rank	Nation	Gold	Silver	Bronze	Total
1	Germany (GER)	3	1	1	5
2	Austria (AUT)	1	0	1	2
3	Russia (RUS)	0	3	0	3
4	Canada (CAN)	0	0	1	1
4	Italy (ITA)	0	0	1	1
Totals (5 entries)		4	4	4	12

== Men's singles ==
Rank	Bib	Athlete	Country	Run 1	Run 2	Total	Behind
1st place, gold medalist(s)	1	Felix Loch	Germany	53.590	53.742	1:47.332	
2nd place, silver medalist(s)	5	Albert Demchenko	Russia	53.840	53.820	1:47.660	+0.328
3rd place, bronze medalist(s)	3	Armin Zöggeler	Italy	53.821	53.925	1:47.746	+0.414
4	4	Johannes Ludwig	Germany	53.873	54.010	1:47.883	+0.551
5	2	Andi Langenhan	Germany	53.904	54.000	1:47.904	+0.572
6	7	David Möller	Germany	54.019	54.130	1:48.149	+0.817
7	19	Samuel Edney	Canada	54.342	54.280	1:48.622	+1.290
8	20	David Mair	Italy	54.318	54.344	1:48.662	+1.330
9	9	Evgeniy Voskresenskiy	Russia	54.279	54.452	1:48.731	+1.399
10	13	Manuel Pfister	Austria	54.382	54.353	1:48.735	+1.403
11	6	Dominik Fischnaller	Italy	54.456	54.435	1:48.891	+1.559
12	15	Wolfgang Kindl	Austria	54.516	54.394	1:48.910	+1.578
13	14	Viktor Kneyb	Russia	54.463	54.448	1:48.911	+1.579
14	16	Jozef Ninis	Slovakia	54.399	54.518	1:48.917	+1.585
15	10	Gregory Carigiet	Switzerland	54.424	54.537	1:48.961	+1.629
16	17	Inars Kivlenieks	Latvia	54.443	54.524	1:48.967	+1.635
17	11	Daniel Pfister	Austria	54.519	54.572	1:49.091	+1.759
18	18	Jo Alexander Koppang	Norway	54.492	54.636	1:49.128	+1.796
19	21	Mārtiņš Rubenis	Latvia	54.713	54.512	1:49.225	+1.893
20	8	Stepan Fedorov	Russia	54.716	54.514	1:49.230	+1.898
21	12	Reinhard Egger	Austria	54.748	54.660	1:49.408	+2.076
22	27	Chris Mazdzer	United States	54.896	54.625	1:49.521	+2.189
23	23	Ondřej Hyman	Czech Republic	54.960	54.788	1:49.748	+2.416
24	22	Thor Haug Norbech	Norway	55.033	54.865	1:49.898	+2.566
25	26	Adam Rosen	Norway	55.112	54.972	1:50.084	+2.752
26	25	Maciej Kurowski	Poland	55.114			
27	28	Valentin Cretu	Romania	55.185			
28	24	Tonnes Stang Rolfsen	Norway	55.254			
29	29	Kristaps Maurins	Latvia	55.406			
30	32	Jakub Hyman	Czech Republic	55.656			
31	31	Andriy Mandziy	Ukraine	55.717			
32	33	Andriy Kis	Ukraine	55.728			
33	30	Danej Navrboc	Slovenia	56.037			
34	35	Bruno Banani	Tonga	56.326			
35	36	Hindenari Kanayama	Japan	56.390			
36	34	Bogdan Macovei	Moldova	56.886			
37	37	Pavel Angelov	Bulgaria	57.224			

== Women's singles ==
Rank	Bib	Athlete	Country	Run 1	Run 2	Total	Behind
1st place, gold medalist(s)	1	Tatjana Hüfner	Germany	52.183	52.198	1:44.381	
2nd place, silver medalist(s)	11	Tatiana Ivanova	Russia	52.161	52.321	1:44.482	+0.101
3rd place, bronze medalist(s)	6	Natalie Geisenberger	Germany	52.407	52.377	1:44.784	+0.403
4	3	Alex Gough	Canada	52.394	52.424	1:44.818	+0.437
5	2	Corinna Martini	Germany	52.503	52.452	1:44.955	+0.574
6	4	Anke Wischnewski	Germany	52.503	52.506	1:45.009	+0.628
7	15	Dayna Clay	Canada	52.716	52.656	1:45.372	+0.991
8	9	Nina Reithmayer	Austria	52.830	52.649	1:45.479	+1.098
9	10	Sandra Gasparini	Italy	52.748	52.769	1:45.517	+1.136
10	12	Arianne Jones	Canada	52.617	52.904	1:45.521	+1.140
11	5	Alexandra Rodionova	Russia	52.792	52.796	1:45.588	+1.207
12	7	Erin Hamlin	United States	53.031	52.558	1:45.589	+1.208
13	13	Natalia Khoreva	Russia	52.896	52.840	1:45.736	+1.355
14	8	Martina Kocher	Switzerland	53.246	52.867	1:46.113	+1.732
15	20	Maija Tiruma	Latvia	53.207	52.959	1:46.166	+1.785
16	17	Birgit Platzer	Austria	53.090	53.227	1:46.317	+1.936
17	19	Maryna Halaydzhyan	Ukraine	53.343	53.142	1:46.485	+2.104
18	16	Raluca Stramaturaru	Romania	53.274	53.506	1:46.780	+2.399
19	21	Ewa Kuls	Poland	53.423	53.521	1:46.944	+2.563
20	18	Mona Wabnigg	Austria	53.449			
21	23	Morgane Bonnefoy	France	53.837			
22	24	Daria Obratov	Croatia	55.043			
23	25	Choi Eun-Ju	South Korea	55.973			
24	22	Eliza Tiruma	Latvia	55.974			
	14	Viera Gburova	Slovakia	53.313	DNF		

== Men's doubles ==
Rank	Bib	Athlete	Country	Run 1	Run 2	Total	Behind
1st place, gold medalist(s)	1	Andreas Linger; Wolfgang Linger	Austria	41.727	41.717	1:23.444	
2nd place, silver medalist(s)	5	Toni Eggert; Sascha Benecken	Germany	41.842	41.822	1:23.664	+0.220
3rd place, bronze medalist(s)	8	Peter Penz; Georg Fischler	Austria	41.870	41.806	1:23.676	+0.232
4	6	Tobias Wendl; Tobias Arlt	Germany	41.837	41.846	1:23.683	+0.239
5	9	Vladislav Yuzhakov; Vladimir Makhnutin	Russia	41.852	41.921	1:23.773	+0.329
6	10	Christian Oberstolz; Patrick Gruber	Italy	41.936	41.985	1:23.921	+0.477
7	2	Ivan Nevmerzhitskiy; Vladimir Prokhorov	Russia	41.884	42.234	1:24.118	+0.674
8	4	Hans Peter Fischnaller; Patrick Schwienbacher	Italy	42.136	42.098	1:24.234	+0.790
9	11	Andris Sics; Juris Sics	Latvia	42.180	42.080	1:24.260	+0.816
10	20	Oskars Gudramovics; Peteris Kalnins	Latvia	42.082	42.258	1:24.340	+0.896
11	7	Christian Niccum; Jayson Terdiman	United States	42.317	42.126	1:24.443	+0.999
12	14	Alexandr Denisyev; Vladislav Antonov	Russia	42.267	42.212	1:24.479	+1.035
13	15	Tristan Walker; Justin Snith	Canada	42.306	42.189	1:24.495	+1.051
14	3	Matthew Mortensen; Preston Griffall	United States	42.305	42.195	1:24.500	+1.056
15	12	Lukas Broz; Antonin Broz	Czech Republic	42.257	42.259	1:24.516	+1.072
16	13	Ronny Pietrasik; Christian Weise	Germany	42.420	42.160	1:24.580	+1.136
17	19	Paul Ifrim; Andrei Anghel	Romania	42.415	42.365	1:24.780	+1.336
18	17	Ludwig Rieder; Patrick Rastner	Italy	42.454	42.388	1:24.842	+1.398
19	16	Andrejs Berze; Uldis Logins	Latvia	42.457			
20	21	Marek Solcansky; Karol Stuchlak	Slovakia	42.533			
21	22	Luca Hunziker; Christian Maag	Switzerland	42.775			
22	24	Ivan Vynnytskyy; Oleh Fitel	Ukraine	43.031			
23	23	Matej Kvicala; Jaromir Kudera	Czech Republic	43.041			
24	18	Jan Harnis; Branislav Regec	Slovakia	43.432			
25	26	Park Jin-Yong; Ryu Sung-Hyun	South Korea	43.618			
26	25	Artur Petyniak; Adam Wanielista	Poland	49.164			
27	27	Ioan Codarcea; Gabriel Barbu	Romania	1:01.811			

== Team relay ==
Rank	Bib	Athlete	Country	Run	Total	Behind
1	13-1; 13-2; 13-3	Tatjana Hüfner; Felix Loch; Toni Eggert/Sascha Benecken	Germany	46.323; 47.557; 48.123	2:22.003	
2	10-1; 10-2; 10-3	Tatiana Ivanova; Albert Demchenko; Vladislav Yuzhakov/Vladimir Makhnutin	Russia	46.332; 47.780; 47.980	2:22.092	+0.089
3	9-1; 9-2; 9-3	Alex Gough; Samuel Edney; Tristan Walker/Justin Snith	Canada	46.447; 47.781; 48.176	2:22.404	+0.401
4	12-1; 12-2; 12-3	Nina Reithmayer; Manuel Pfister; Andreas Linger/Wolfgang Linger	Austria	46.779; 48.135; 47.822	2:22.736	+0.733
5	11-1; 11-2; 11-3	Sandra Gasparini; Armin Zöggeler; Christian Oberstolz/Patrick Gruber	Italy	46.940; 47.774; 48.032	2:22.746	+0.743
6	8-1; 8-2; 8-3	Erin Hamlin; Chris Mazdzer; Christian Niccum/Jayson Terdiman	United States	46.657; 48.268; 48.243	2:23.168	+1.165
7	6-1; 6-2; 6-3	Maija Tiruma; Inars Kivlenieks; Andris Sics/Juris Sics	Latvia	47.150; 47.972; 48.171	2:23.293	+1.290
8	7-1; 7-2; 7-3	Martina Kocher; Gregory Carigiet; Luca Hunziker/Christian Maag	Switzerland	47.478; 48.080; 49.151	2:24.709	+2.706
9	4-1; 4-2; 4-3	Viera Gburova; Jozef Ninis; Marek Solcansky/Karol Stuchlak	Slovakia	47.822; 48.041; 48.910	2:24.773	+2.770
10	3-1; 3-2; 3-3	Raluca Stramaturaru; Valentin Cretu; Paul Ifrim/Andrei Anghel	Romania	47.525; 48.589; 48.960	2:25.074	+3.071
11	5-1; 5-2; 5-3	Ewa Kuls; Maciej Kurowski; Artur Petyniak/Adam Wanielista	Poland	47.649; 48.420; 49.382	2:25.451	+3.448
12	2-1; 2-2; 2-3	Maryna Halaydzhyan; Andriy Mandziy; Ivan Vynnytskyy/Oleh Fitel	Ukraine	47.380; 49.176; 49.691	2:26.247	+4.244
13	1-1; 1-2; 1-3	Sung Eun-ryung; Kyu Kim-min; Park Jin-yong/Ryu Sung-hyun	South Korea	48.459; 1:06.986; 52.365	2:47.810	+25.807

== Finalists ==
City	Country	Winter Olympics	FIL World Championships hosted	FIBT World Championships hosted	Track
Altenberg	Germany	None	1996	1991 (Bobsleigh), 2000 (Men's bobsleigh), 2008	Altenberg
~~Whistler, British Columbia~~	~~Canada~~	~~2010~~	~~None~~	~~None~~	~~Whistler~~

Both tracks submitted their proposals prior to the end of the bidding deadline. Altenberg was chosen following Whistler withdrawing their bid.
