= FIL World Luge Championships 2013 =

The FIL World Luge Championships 2013 took place under the auspices of the International Luge Federation at the bobsleigh, luge, and skeleton track in Whistler, British Columbia, Canada. The facility was chosen at the 57th FIL Congress in Liberec, Czech Republic on 20 June 2009. Whistler was the only venue bidding for the championships.

== Medalists ==
Event	Gold	Silver	Bronze
Men's singles	Felix Loch; Germany	Andi Langenhan; Germany	Johannes Ludwig; Germany
Women's singles	Natalie Geisenberger; Germany	Tatjana Hüfner; Germany	Alex Gough; Canada
Doubles	Germany; Tobias Wendl; Tobias Arlt	Germany; Toni Eggert; Sascha Benecken	Austria; Andreas Linger; Wolfgang Linger
Team relay	Germany; Natalie Geisenberger; Felix Loch; Tobias Wendl / Tobias Arlt	Canada; Alex Gough; Samuel Edney; Tristan Walker / Justin Snith	Latvia; Elīza Tīruma; Inārs Kivlenieks; Andris Šics / Juris Šics

== Medal table ==
Rank	Nation	Gold	Silver	Bronze	Total
1	Germany (GER)	4	3	1	8
2	Canada (CAN)	0	1	1	2
3	Austria (AUT)	0	0	1	1
3	Latvia (LAT)	0	0	1	1
Totals (4 entries)		4	4	4	12

== Results ==
=== Men's singles ===
Rank	Bib	Athlete	Country	Run 1	Run 2	Total	Behind
1st place, gold medalist(s)	1	Felix Loch	Germany	48.133 (1)	48.242 (1)	1:36.375	
2nd place, silver medalist(s)	4	Andi Langenhan	Germany	48.316 (2)	48.434 (4)	1:36.750	+0.375
3rd place, bronze medalist(s)	7	Johannes Ludwig	Germany	48.338 (3)	48.437 (5)	1:36.775	+0.400
4	2	David Möller	Germany	48.424 (4)	48.362 (3)	1:36.786	+0.411
5	16	Samuel Edney	Canada	48.446 (5)	48.350 (2)	1:36.796	+0.421
6	12	Chris Mazdzer	United States	48.581 (8)	48.543 (6)	1:37.124	+0.749
7	3	Albert Demtschenko	Russia	48.578 (7)	48.552 (7)	1:37.130	+0.755
8	5	Wolfgang Kindl	Austria	48.573 (6)	48.596 (10)	1:37.169	+0.794
9	10	Inars Kivlenieks	Latvia	48.622 (10)	48.559 (8)	1:37.181	+0.806
10	13	Daniel Pfister	Austria	48.602 (9)	48.654 (13)	1:37.256	+0.881
11	18	Jo Alexander Koppang	Norway	48.695 (13)	48.608 (11)	1:37.303	+0.928
12	19	Mārtiņš Rubenis	Latvia	48.675 (11)	48.653 (12)	1:37.328	+0.953
13	14	Gregory Carigiet	Switzerland	48.699 (14)	48.663 (14)	1:37.362	+0.987
14	8	Viktor Kneyb	Russia	48.692 (12)	48.752 (18)	1:37.444	+1.069
15	20	Jozef Ninis	Slovakia	48.757 (15)	48.692 (15)	1:37.449	+1.074
16	17	Dominik Fischnaller	Italy	48.918 (23)	48.576 (9)	1:37.494	+1.119
17	21	Taylor Morris	United States	48.763 (16)	48.780 (20)	1:37.543	+1.168
18	9	David Mair	Italy	48.793 (17)	48.771 (19)	1:37.564	+1.189
19	25	Ondřej Hyman	Czech Republic	48.894 (21)	48.709 (16)	1:37.603	+1.228
20	15	Manuel Pfister	Austria	48.889 (20)	48.780 (20)	1:37.669	+1.294
21	11	Reinhard Egger	Austria	48.965 (25)	48.712 (17)	1:37.677	+1.302
22	23	Thor Haug Norbech	Norway	48.869 (18)	48.855 (22)	1:37.724	+1.349
23	24	Adam Rosen	Great Britain	48.878 (19)	48.884 (23)	1:37.762	+1.387
24	28	John Fennell	Canada	48.915 (22)	48.968 (24)	1:37.883	+1.508
25	30	Mitchel Malyk	Canada	48.935 (24)	49.005 (25)	1:37.940	+1.565
26	22	Kristaps Maurins	Latvia	48.966 (26)		48.966	
27	29	Aleksandr Peretjagin	Russia	48.995 (27)		48.995	
28	27	Bruno Banani	Tonga	49.026 (28)		49.026	
29	34	Andriy Mandziy	Ukraine	49.075 (29)		49.075	
30	26	Maciej Kurowski	Poland	49.099 (30)		49.099	
31	31	Tonnes Stang Rolfsen	Norway	49.120 (31)		49.120	
32	32	Valentin Cretu	Romania	49.201 (32)		49.201	
32	33	Andriy Kis	Ukraine	49.201 (32)		49.201	
34	35	Danej Navrboc	Slovenia	49.307 (34)		49.307	
35	36	Hidenari Kanayama	Japan	49.584 (35)		49.584	
36	37	Pavel Angelov	Bulgaria	49.968 (36)		49.968	
37	38	Tilen Sirse	Slovenia	50.001 (37)		50.001	
38	39	Kim Dong-hyeon	South Korea	50.375 (38)		50.375	
39	40	Stanislav Benyov	Bulgaria	50.590 (39)		50.590	
40	6	Semen Pavlichenko	Russia	51.791 (40)		51.791	
41	41	Imre Pulai	Hungary	52.512 (41)		52.512	

=== Doubles ===
Rank	Bib	Athlete	Country	Run 1	Run 2	Total	Behind
1st place, gold medalist(s)	9	Tobias Wendl; Tobias Arlt	Germany	36.347 (1)	36.495 (1)	1:12.842	
2nd place, silver medalist(s)	8	Toni Eggert; Sascha Benecken	Germany	36.505 (2)	36.537 (2)	1:13.042	+0.200
3rd place, bronze medalist(s)	10	Andreas Linger; Wolfgang Linger	Austria	36.591 (3)	36.677 (4)	1:13.268	+0.426
4	11	Tristan Walker; Justin Snith	Canada	36.674 (5)	36.672 (3)	1:13.346	+0.504
5	5	Peter Penz; Georg Fischler	Austria	36.693 (7)	36.756 (5)	1:13.449	+0.607
6	7	Andris Sics; Juris Sics	Latvia	36.682 (6)	36.776 (6)	1:13.458	+0.616
7	3	Christian Oberstolz; Patrick Gruber	Italy	36.694 (8)	36.810 (9)	1:13.504	+0.662
8	1	Vladislav Yuzhakov; Vladimir Makhnutin	Russia	36.728 (9)	36.839 (11)	1:13.567	+0.725
9	2	Ludwig Rieder; Patrick Rastner	Italy	36.672 (4)	36.896 (14)	1:13.568	+0.726
10	15	Oskars Gudramovics; Peteris Kalnins	Latvia	36.774 (10)	36.815 (10)	1:13.589	+0.747
11	14	Andrei Bogdanov; Andrey Medvedev	Russia	36.823 (12)	36.783 (8)	1:13.606	+0.764
12	13	Alexandr Denisyev; Vladislav Antonov	Russia	36.831 (14)	36.778 (7)	1:13.609	+0.767
13	6	Hans Peter Fischnaller; Patrick Schwienbacher	Italy	36.821 (11)	36.855 (12)	1:13.676	+0.834
14	12	Matthew Mortensen; Preston Griffall	United States	36.862 (15)	36.880 (13)	1:13.742	+0.900
15	4	Lukas Broz; Antonin Broz	Czech Republic	36.825 (13)	36.934 (15)	1:13.759	+0.917
16	17	Jan Harnis; Branislav Regec	Slovakia	37.162 (17)	37.043 (16)	1:14.205	+1.363
17	23	Matej Kvicala; Jaromir Kudera	Czech Republic	37.115 (16)	37.162 (17)	1:14.277	+1.435
18	21	Patryk Poreba; Karol Mikrut	Poland	37.267 (18)	37.433 (18)	1:14.700	+1.858
19	20	Ivan Vynnytskyy; Oleh Fitel	Ukraine	37.323 (19)		37.323	
20	18	Paul Ifrim; Andrei Anghel	Romania	37.385 (20)		37.385	
21	16	Jake Hyrns; Andrew Sherk	United States	37.424 (21)		37.424	
22	19	Marek Solcansky; Karol Stuchlak	Slovakia	37.497 (22)		37.497	
23	22	Park Jin-Yong; Kwon Ju-Hyeok	South Korea	37.983 (23)		37.983	

=== Women's singles ===
Rank	Bib	Athlete	Country	Run 1	Run 2	Total	Behind
1st place, gold medalist(s)	5	Natalie Geisenberger	Germany	36.688 (1)	36.740 (1)	1:13.428	
2nd place, silver medalist(s)	7	Tatjana Hüfner	Germany	36.787 (2)	36.747 (2)	1:13.534	+0.106
3rd place, bronze medalist(s)	9	Alex Gough	Canada	36.788 (3)	36.758 (3)	1:13.546	+0.118
4	3	Anke Wischnewski	Germany	36.812 (4)	36.846 (4)	1:13.658	+0.230
5	11	Aileen Frisch	Germany	36.959 (7)	36.856 (5)	1:13.815	+0.387
6	8	Erin Hamlin	United States	36.924 (5)	36.932 (6)	1:13.856	+0.428
7	10	Kimberley McRae	Canada	36.977 (10)	36.962 (7)	1:13.939	+0.511
8	13	Arianne Jones	Canada	36.964 (8)	36.985 (8)	1:13.949	+0.521
9	4	Julia Clukey	United States	36.996 (11)	36.988 (10)	1:13.984	+0.556
10	12	Eliza Tiruma	Latvia	36.939 (6)	37.056 (14)	1:13.995	+0.567
11	14	Martina Kocher	Switzerland	37.042 (12)	36.986 (9)	1:14.028	+0.600
12	15	Alexandra Rodionova	Russia	36.973 (9)	37.067 (15)	1:14.040	+0.612
13	2	Nina Reithmayer	Austria	37.058 (13)	37.019 (11)	1:14.077	+0.649
14	16	Kate Hansen	United States	37.072 (16)	37.020 (12)	1:14.092	+0.664
15	1	Tatiana Ivanova	Russia	37.100 (18)	37.029 (13)	1:14.129	+0.701
16	17	Ekaterina Baturina	Russia	37.061 (15)	37.072 (16)	1:14.133	+0.705
17	6	Sandra Gasparini	Italy	37.081 (17)	37.115 (19)	1:14.196	+0.768
18	18	Raluca Strămăturaru	Romania	37.060 (14)	37.150 (20)	1:14.210	+0.782
19	20	Jordan Smith	Canada	37.141 (19)	37.103 (17)	1:14.244	+0.816
20	21	Mona Wabnigg	Austria	37.236 (20)	37.110 (18)	1:14.346	+0.918
21	24	Natalia Khoreva	Russia	37.246 (21)		37.246	
22	19	Emily Sweeney	United States	37.251 (22)		37.251	
23	22	Birgit Platzer	Austria	37.312 (23)		37.312	
24	25	Ewa Kuls	Poland	37.338 (24)		37.338	
25	27	Morgane Bonnefoy	France	37.441 (25)		37.441	
26	23	Maryna Halaydzhyan	Ukraine	37.497 (26)		37.497	
27	26	Anastasia Polusytok	Ukraine	37.572 (27)		37.572	
28	29	Daria Obratov	Croatia	37.821 (28)		37.821	
29	30	Sung Eun-Ryung	South Korea	38.086 (29)		38.086	
	28	Olena Shkhumova	Ukraine	DNF		DNF	
	31	Viera Gburova	Slovakia	DNF		DNF	

=== Team relay ===
Rank	Bib	Country	Athlete	Women's singles	Men's singles	Men's doubles	Total	Behind
1st place, gold medalist(s)	9	Germany	Natalie Geisenberger; Felix Loch; Tobias Wendl / Tobias Arlt	39.906 (1)	41.926 (1)	41.994 (1)	2:03.826	
2nd place, silver medalist(s)	12	Canada	Alex Gough; Samuel Edney; Tristan Walker / Justin Snith	40.014 (2)	41.993 (2)	42.265 (4)	2:04.272	+0.446
3rd place, bronze medalist(s)	7	Latvia	Eliza Tiruma; Inars Kivlenieks; Andris Sics / Juris Sics	40.328 (4)	42.265 (7)	42.261 (3)	2:04.854	+1.028
4	11	Austria	Nina Reithmayer; Wolfgang Kindl; Andreas Linger / Wolfgang Linger	40.435 (5)	42.173 (3)	42.254 (2)	2:04.862	+1.036
5	6	United States	Erin Hamlin; Chris Mazdzer; Matthew Mortensen / Preston Griffall	40.224 (3)	42.177 (4)	42.465 (7)	2:04.866	+1.040
6	10	Italy	Sandra Gasparini; Dominik Fischnaller; Christian Oberstolz / Patrick Gruber	40.544 (7)	42.201 (5)	42.409 (6)	2:05.154	+1.328
7	8	Russia	Alexandra Rodionova; Albert Demtschenko; Vladislav Yuzhakov / Vladimir Makhnutin	40.508 (6)	42.296 (8)	42.389 (5)	2:05.193	+1.367
8	3	Poland	Ewa Kuls; Maciej Kurowski; Patryk Poreba / Karol Mikrut	40.708 (10)	42.575 (9)	43.054 (8)	2:06.337	+2.511
9	5	Slovakia	Viera Gburova; Jozef Ninis; Jan Harnis / Branislav Regec	40.802 (11)	42.260 (6)	43.767 (9)	2:06.829	+3.003
10	1	South Korea	Sung Eun-Ryung; Kim Dong-hyeon; Park Jin-Yong / Kwon Ju-Hyeok	42.045 (12)	44.180 (12)	45.750 (10)	2:11.975	+8.149
	2	Ukraine	Maryna Halaydzhyan; Andriy Kis; Ivan Vynnytskyy / Oleh Fitel	40.601 (9)	42.705 (10)	DNF		
	4	Romania	Raluca Strămăturaru; Valentin Cretu; Paul Ifrim / Andrei Anghel	40.555 (8)	42.945 (11)	DNF		
