= Ifrim =

Ifrim is a Romanian surname. Notable people with the surname include:

- DJ Miki Love (Mihaela Ifrim), Romanian DJ and topless dancer
- Mihaela Ifrim, Romanian-American mathematician
- Paul Ifrim (born 1988), Romanian luger
