= Jonathan Myles =

American luger (born 1982)

Jonathan Myles (born July 24, 1982) is an American luger who competed from 1999 to 2006. He finished 18th in the men's singles event at the 2006 Winter Olympics in Turin. Myles best finish at the FIL World Luge Championships was 12th in the men's singles event at Nagano in 2004.

A native of Rumney, New Hampshire, Myles co-owned a landscaping business in Lake Placid, New York, with fellow American luger Preston Griffall.

Acting credits include: Laugh- Nicola Anslonave Sorry Baby- The man she thought was Dekker
