= Morgane Bonnefoy =

French luger (born 1990)

Personal information
- Nationality: French
- Born: 18 September 1990 (age 35) Bourg-Saint-Maurice, France
- Height: 1.64 m (5 ft 5 in)
- Weight: 68 kg (150 lb)

Sport
- Country: France
- Sport: Luge
- Event: Women's singles

Morgane Bonnefoy (born 18 September 1990 in Bourg-Saint-Maurice) is a French luger.

Bonnefoy competed at the 2014 Winter Olympics for France. In the Women's singles she placed 27th.

As of September 2014, Bonnefoy's best performance at the FIL World Luge Championships is 21st, in the 2012 Championships.

As of September 2014, Bonnefoy's best Luge World Cup overall finish is 24th in 2011–12.
