= Paramonovo, Moscow Oblast =

Rural locality in Dmitrovsky District, Moscow Oblast, Russia

Coordinates: 56°14′44″N 37°26′39″E

Paramonovo (Russian: Парамо́ново) is a village in Dmitrovsky District of Moscow Oblast, Russia, located 80 kilometers (50 mi) west of Moscow. It is well known for its winter sports activities.

== Sporting activities ==
Among its well-known activities are skiing and snowboarding. Construction occurred between February and December 2007 on a bobsleigh, luge, and skeleton track which would officially open on March 10, 2008.
