= Sung Eun-ryung =

South Korean luger (born 1992)

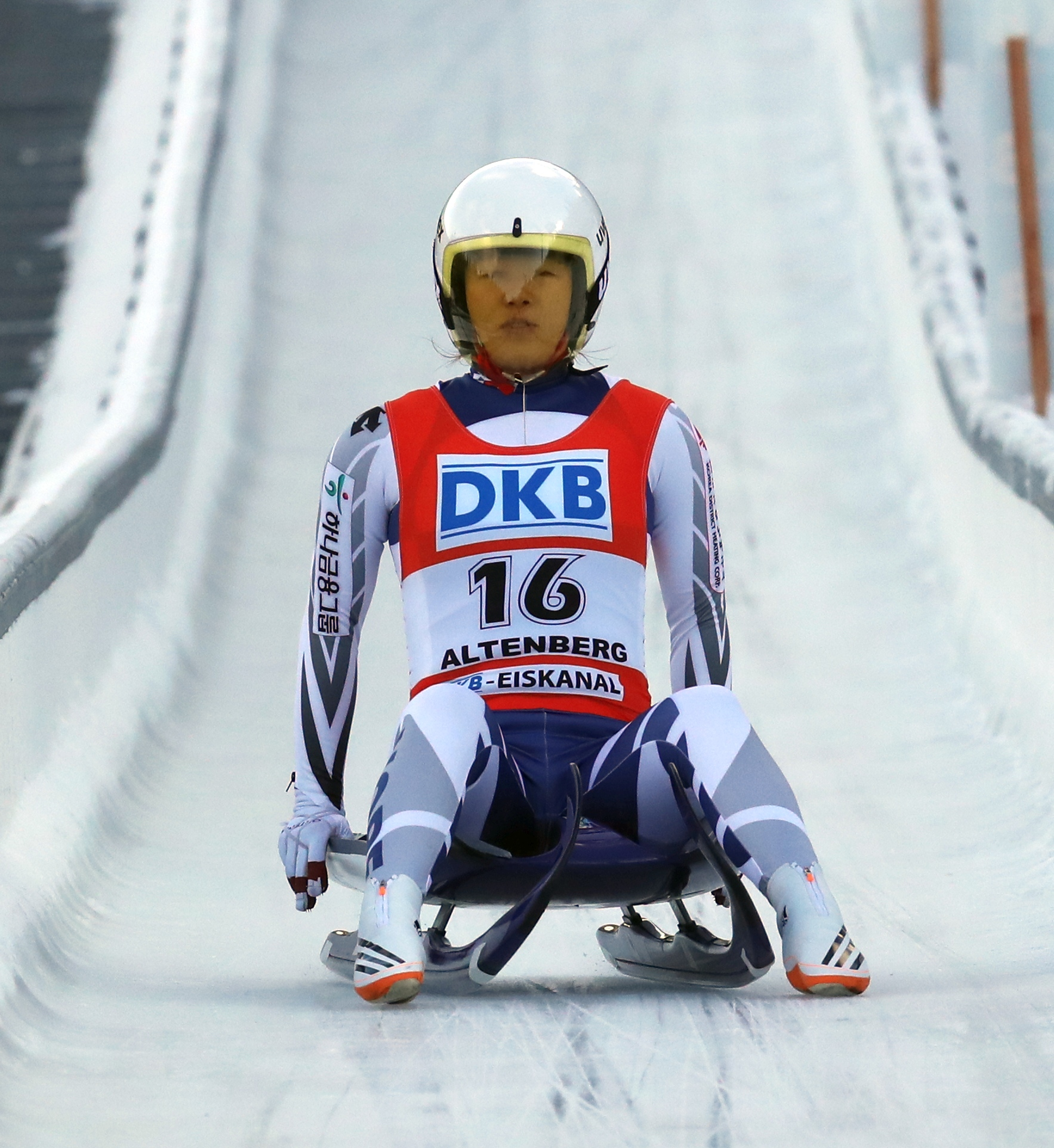
- Sung in 2017

Personal information
- Nationality: South Korean
- Born: 14 April 1992 (age 34) Seoul, South Korea
- Height: 1.64 m (5 ft 5 in)
- Weight: 58 kg (128 lb)

Sport
- Country: South Korea
- Sport: Luge
- Event: Women's singles

Korean name
- Hangul: 성은령
- RR: Seong Eunryeong
- MR: Sŏng Ŭllyŏng

Sung Eun-ryung (born 14 April 1992 in Seoul) is a South Korean luger.

Sung competed at the 2014 Winter Olympics for South Korea. In the Women's singles she placed 29th. She was also a part of the South Korean relay team, which finished 12th.

As of September 2014, Sung's best performance at the FIL World Luge Championships is 29th, in the 2013 Championships.

As of September 2014, Sung's best Luge World Cup overall finish is 35th in 2011–12.

== Education ==
- Yong In University
