= DJ Miki Love =

Romanian DJ (born 1984)

- Born: Mihaela Ifrim; 1984 (age 41–42); Socialist Republic of Romania
- Occupation: DJ
- Years active: 2007-present
- Known for: the 1st topless DJ in Romania

DJ Miki Love (Mihaela Ifrim; born 1984) is a Romanian DJ and dancer, best known for performing in topless in her sets.

== Career ==
She started performing in February 2007, in one of the most important clubs: Anyin Bucharest and Club Princess, becoming the first topless DJ in Romania. Shortly thereafter, she received invitations from clubs in Bucharest and then the other large cities in Romania. She became quite successful both nationally and internationally.

Love said she had no difficulty performing topless, because she had previously worked as a dancer. In November 2009 she released her first single, “Black Pussy”, a release that got positive reviews from fans and from Romanian media. The material recorded a success in Netherlands, Belgium, Hungary, Bulgaria, Britain and France.
