= Ewa Kuls-Kusyk =

Polish luger (born 1991)

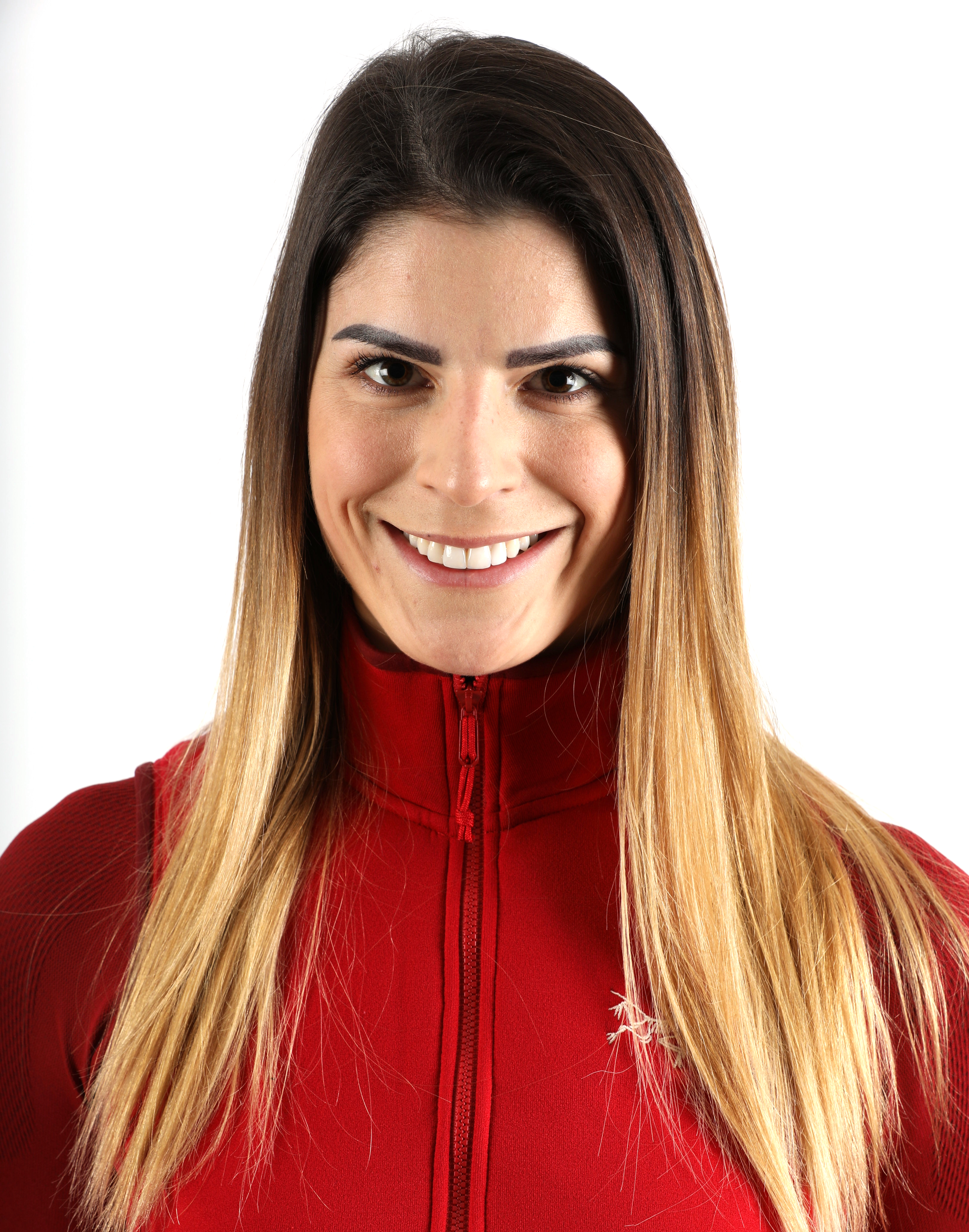
Ewa Kuls (2018)

Ewa Kuls-Kusyk (née Kuls, born 3 September 1991) is a Polish luger, born in Gorzów Wielkopolski. She competed at the FIL World Luge Championships 2012 in Altenberg, at the FIL World Luge Championships 2013 in Whistler, British Columbia, at the 2014 Winter Olympics in Sochi in women's singles, and at the 2018 Winter Olympics in Pyeongchang in women's singles and team relay.
