= Mihaela Ifrim =

Romanian-American mathematician

Mihaela Ifrim is a Romanian and American mathematician specializing in the mathematical analysis of partial differential equations, including nonlinear dispersive equations and the equations used to model fluid dynamics and water waves. She is a professor of mathematics at the University of Wisconsin–Madison.

== Education and career ==
Ifrim received a bachelor's degree in 2006, through the Faculty of Mathematics and Computer Science at the University of Bucharest. After a 2007 master's degree in the Institute of Mathematics of the Romanian Academy. she continued her studies at the University of California, Davis, completing her Ph.D. in 2012. Her dissertation, Normal Form Transformations for Quasilinear Wave Equations, was supervised by John Kelso Hunter.

She held a Canada Research Chair Postdoctoral Fellowship at McMaster University from 2012 to 2013, and was a Simons Postdoctoral Scholar at the University of California, Berkeley from 2014 to 2017. In 2017, she took an assistant professorship at the University of Wisconsin–Madison. She was promoted to associate professor in 2020 and to full professor in 2024. Her long-term collaboration with Daniel Tataru deserves special mention. From 2014 to 2025, according to MathSciNet, Ifrim authored 28 out of 31 scientific articles jointly with Tataru.

== Recognition ==
Ifrim was a 2019 Sloan Research Fellow. In 2025, the University of Wisconsin–Madison named Ifrim as a Vilas Associate, recognizing her "new and ongoing research of the highest quality and significance". She was a 2025 recipient of the Presidential Early Career Award for Scientists and Engineers.
