= Pavel Kuzmich =

Russian luger (born 1988)

Pavel Kuzmich (born 16 June 1988 in Krasnoyarsk) is a Russian luger who has competed since 2009. His best World Cup finish was 16th in the men's doubles event at Igls on 28 November 2009.
