= Boris Kuryschkin =

Russian luger (born 1989)

Boris Alexejewitsch Kuryschkin (born 21 June 1989 in Dmitrovsky District, Moscow) is a Russian luger who has competed since 1999. He finished 26th in the men's doubles competition in the 2007-08 World Cup.
