= Tristan Walker =

Canadian luger (born 1991)

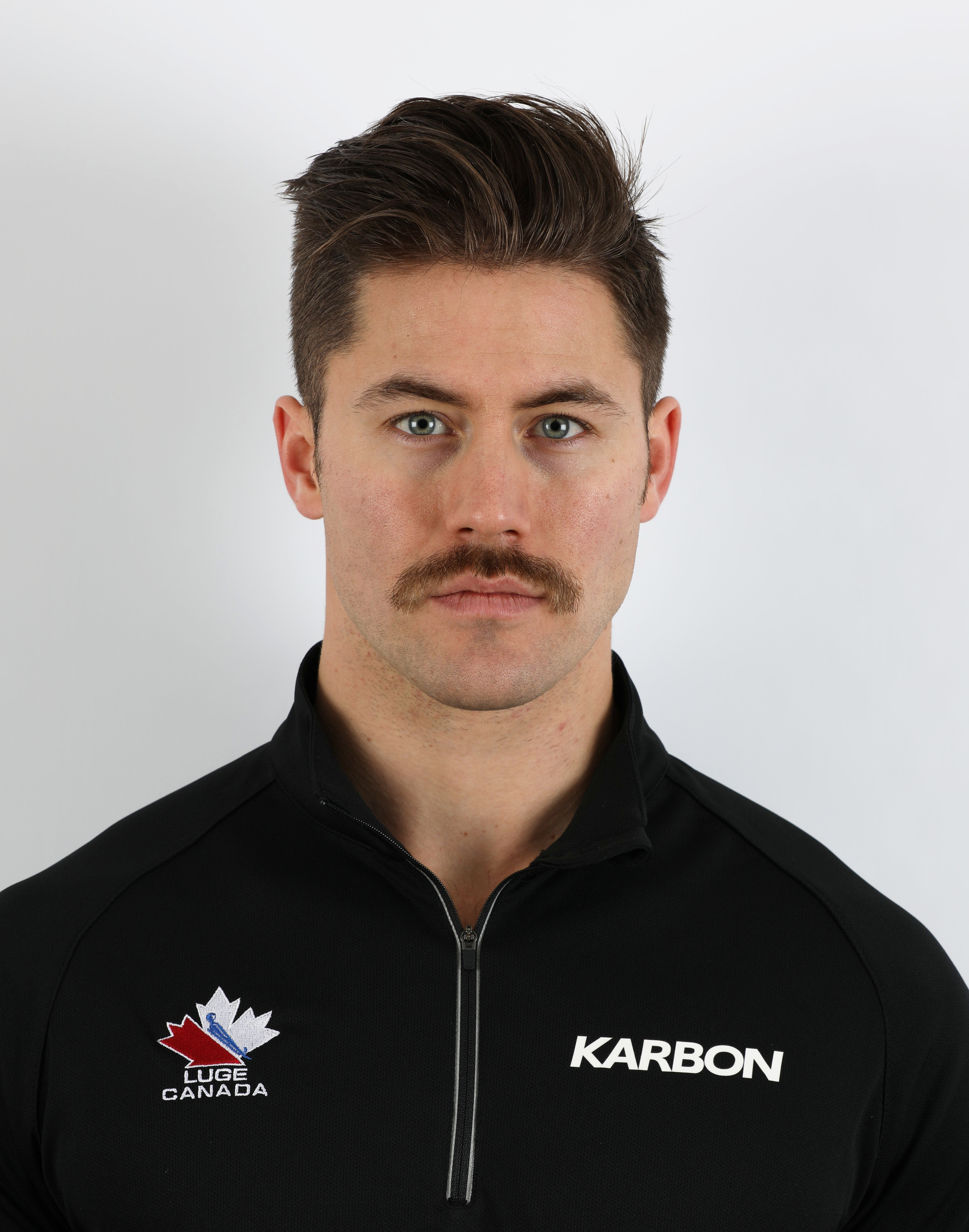
- Walker in 2018

Personal information
- Born: May 16, 1991 (age 35) Calgary, Alberta, Canada
- Height: 185 cm (6 ft 1 in)
Medal record
Men's luge
Representing Canada
Olympic Games
| Silver medal – second place | 2018 Pyeongchang | Mixed team |
World Championships
| Silver medal – second place | 2013 Whistler | Mixed team |
| Bronze medal – third place | 2012 Altenberg | Mixed team |
| Bronze medal – third place | 2015 Sigulda | Mixed team |
| Bronze medal – third place | 2016 Königssee | Mixed team |

Tristan Walker (born May 16, 1991, in Calgary, Alberta) is a Canadian luger who has competed since 2008. He has three Luge World Cup doubles podium finishes and was 8th in men's doubles at Cesana in the 2011 World Championships.

Walker qualified for the 2010 Winter Olympics, where he finished 15th. Walker also qualified for the 2014 Winter Olympics in Sochi, Russia. He competed in both the Doubles race and the Team Relay (which made its Olympic appearance in 2014). He and his teammate Justin Snith missed the podium in the doubles event by just five-one hundredths (0.05) of a second for the best-ever Olympic result by a Canadian sled in the event. They joined Alex Gough and Samuel Edney for the Mixed team event and had another Olympic fourth-place finish. The team won silver at the 2013 World Championships, following bronze in 2012.

== 2022 Olympics ==
In January 2022, Walker was named to Canada's 2022 Olympic team.
