= Paramonovo bobsleigh, luge, and skeleton track =

Sports venue in Paramonovo, Russia

Coordinates: 56°14′44″N 37°26′39″E

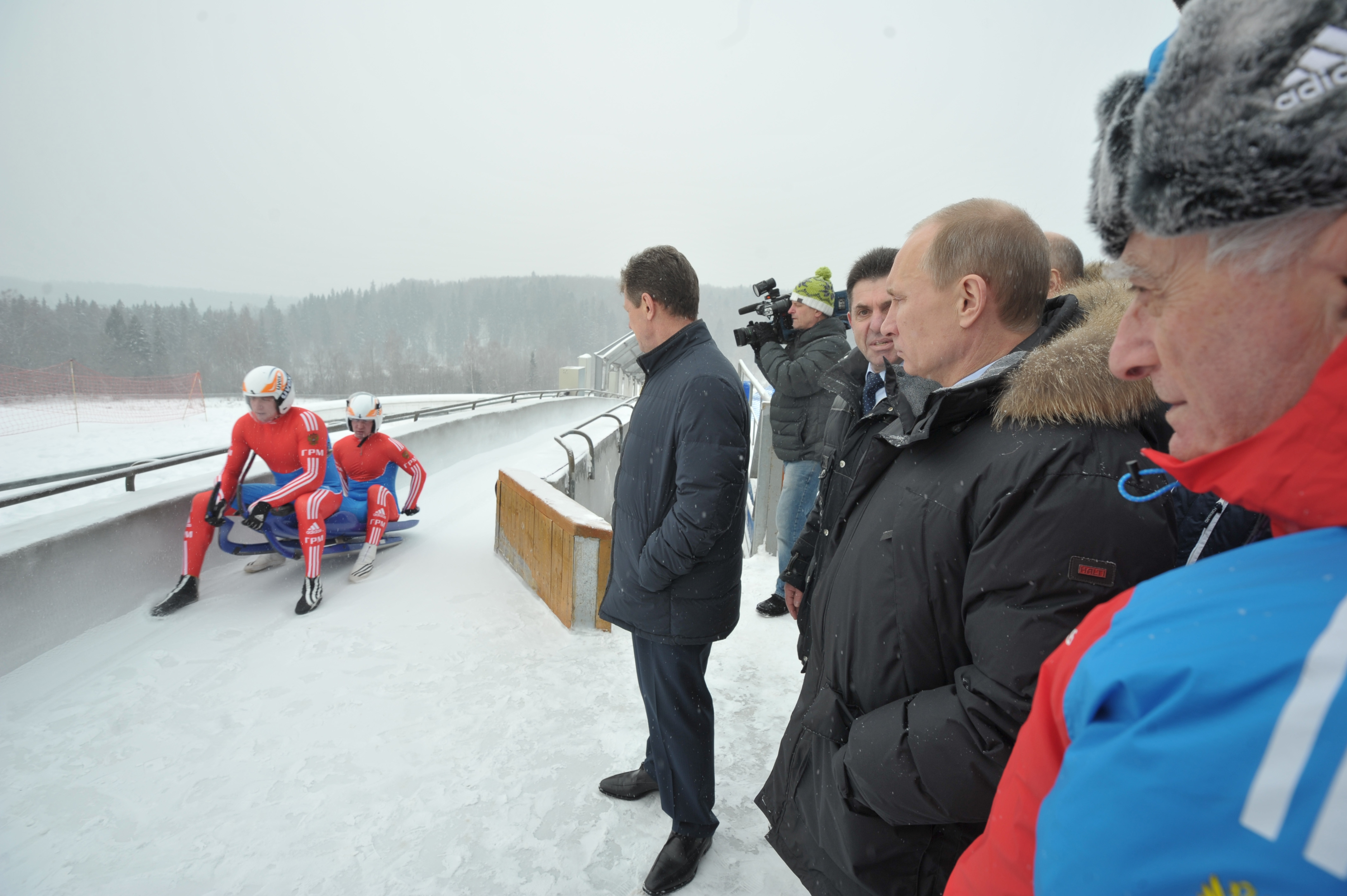
Vladimir Putin visiting the Paramonovo complex in 2012

The Paramonovo bobsleigh, luge, and skeleton track is a bobsleigh, luge, and skeleton located in Paramonovo, Russia, 60 kilometers (37 mi) outside of Moscow.

== History ==
During the 1970s, the Soviet Union found success in luge with Vera Zozula, Dainis Bremse, Algars Kirkis, and Sergey Danilin at the Winter Olympics, FIL World Luge Championships, and FIL European Luge Championships. By 1986, a track at Sigulda in the Latvian Soviet Socialist Republic (now Latvia) was completed which allowed bobsledders and lugers to compete. Following the breakup of the Soviet Union in late 1991, which included Latvia's independence a year earlier, the Sigulda track became part of Latvia as a result. This caused Russia's bobsleigh and luge program to suffer throughout most of that decade. In the late 1990s, Russia began to gather success again in bobsleigh, luge, specifically with Alexandre Zoubkov and Albert Demtschenko who won a total of two Winter Olympic medals (both at the 2006 games), four world championship medals (all by Zoubkov), and three European luge championships medals (all by Demtschenko). Russia also won a world championship medal in skeleton in 2003. Because of the success of the Russian sliding teams, it was decided to construct not one, but two new tracks. The first would be near Moscow while the second one would be in Krasnaya Polyana with the latter part of Sochi's bid to earn the 2014 Winter Olympics. The foundation stone was laid down in February 2007. By July 2007, 400 meters of the track had been completed. Track construction was completed in December 2007. Official opening of the track occurred on 10 March 2008. Construction cost for the track was USD45 million. The Russian national championships also took place during that time. The track was partially homologated by the International Luge Federation (FIL) during the weekend of 29 March 2009. Over 100 runs were performed from the three different start houses (Men's singles, Women's singles/ men's doubles, and juniors) without any accidents occurring. Reasons the track was not fully homologated included extending the safety walls and location to store the sleds and equipment at the women's start house. According to Germany's Klaus Bonsack, a member of the FIL Track Construction Commission, brickwork has already been completed for a hotel near the track. The track will debut by hosting the first two Luge Junior World Cups on 7–12 December 2009. Homologation for the track was given for this event on 8 December 2009. The first bobsleigh and skeleton competition took place at the track on 21 March 2010.

Since winter 2015/2016 track is not frozen, all training and competitions are moved in Sochi

== Statistics ==
=== Physical characteristics ===
The track has 19 curves with an elevation difference of 105 meters. Because of the natural elevation difference of only 78 meters, the first 300 meters of the track are mounted on steel pillars up to 27 meters high. Starting from a tower like that of Sigulda, Latvia, the track has a maximum grade of 15%.

=== Track technical details ===
Because of Russian environmental regulations prohibiting the outdoor usage of ammonia refrigeration systems, three cooling systems consisting of an ammonia-carbon dioxide cascade system was used.
