= Vladimir Prokhorov =

Russian luger (born 1984)

Vladimir Prokhorov (born May 25, 1984 in Chusovoy, Perm Krai) is a Russian luger who has competed since 2000. He finished tenth in the men's doubles event at the 2008 FIL European Luge Championships in Cesana, Italy.

Neverzhitiski also finished 13th in the men's doubles event twice at the FIL World Luge Championships (2007, 2008).
