= Corinna Martini =

German luger

Medal record

Luge

Representing Germany

European Championships
Silver medal – second place	2010 Sigulda	Women's singles
Bronze medal – third place	2010 Sigulda	Mixed team

Corrina Martini (born 19 June 1985 in Winterberg, North Rhine-Westphalia) is a German luger who has competed since 2005. She won two medals at the FIL European Luge Championships 2010 in Sigulda with a silver in the women's singles and a bronze in the mixed team events.

Martini also finished 19th in the 2008-09 Luge World Cup.
