= Inārs Kivlenieks =

Latvian luger (born 1986)

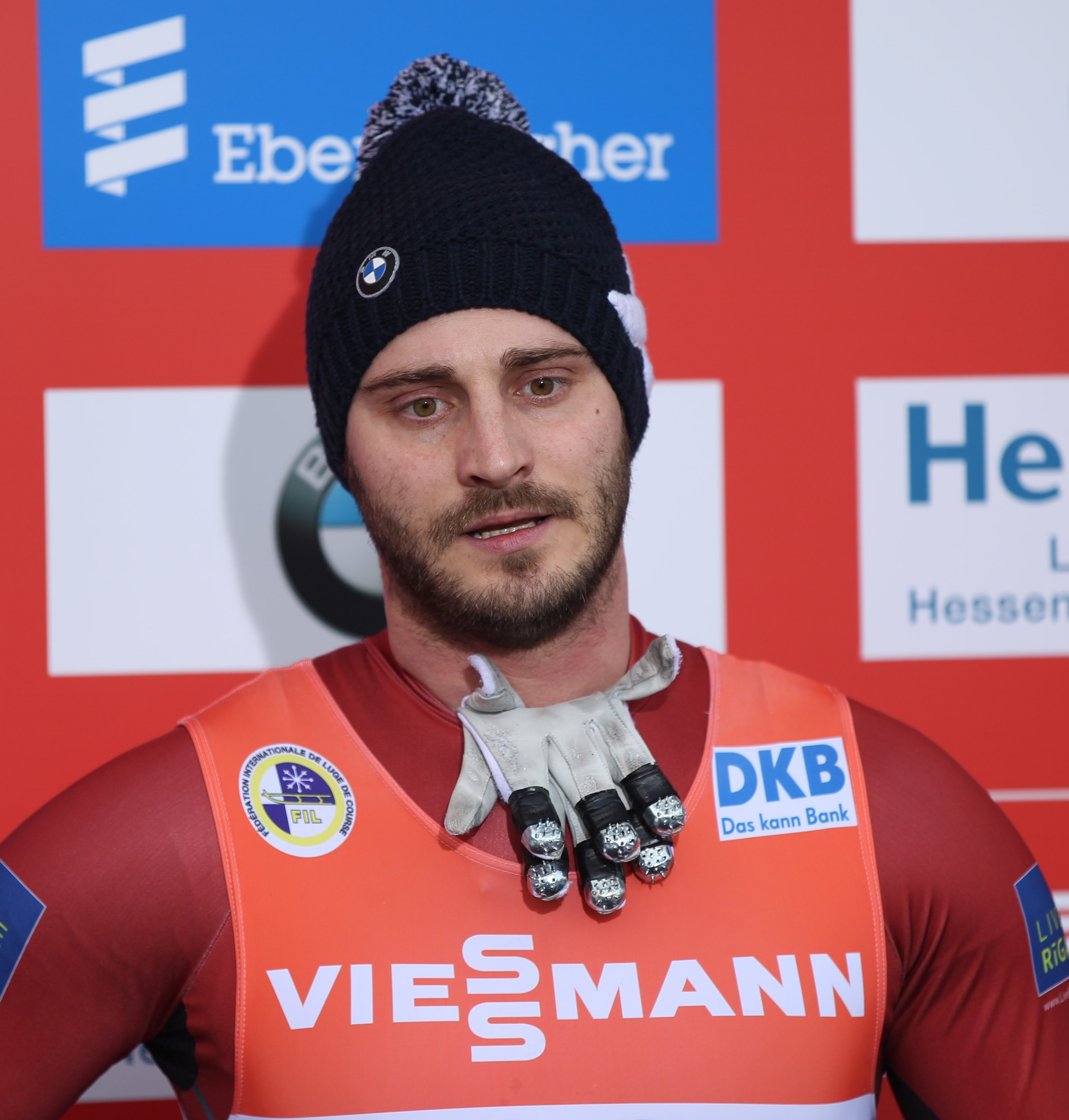

Medal record

Men's luge

Representing Latvia

World Championships
| Silver medal – second place | 2016 Königssee | Mixed team |
| Bronze medal – third place | 2013 Whistler | Mixed team |

European Championships
| Bronze medal – third place | 2018 Sigulda | Mixed team |
| Bronze medal – third place | 2019 Oberhof | Mixed team |

Inārs Kivlenieks (born 4 July 1986 in Riga) is a Latvian luger who has competed since 2005. His best Luge World Cup season finish was 20th in men's doubles in 2006–07.

Kivlenieks' best finish at the FIL World Luge Championships was 28th in men's singles at Oberhof in 2008. His best finish at the FIL European Luge Championships was 13th in men's singles at Cesana Pariol in 2008.

Kivilenieks competed for Latvia at the 2010 Winter Olympics, where he finished 18th in the men's singles event. In the same event in 2014 he placed 16th and in 2018 he placed 20th.
