= Vladimir Makhnutin =

Russian luger (born 1987)

Medal record

Luge

Representing Russia

World Championships
Silver medal – second place	2012 Altenberg	Mixed team

European Championships
Gold medal – first place	2012 Paramonovo	Mixed team
Gold medal – first place	2014 Sigulda	Mixed team
Silver medal – second place	2014 Sigulda	Men's doubles
Bronze medal – third place	2013 Oberhof	Mixed team

Vladimir Vladimirovich Makhnutin (Russian: Владимир Владимирович Махнутин; born 28 October 1987 in Chusovoy, Perm Krai), or Vladimir Machnutin, is a Russian luger who has competed since 1997. His best Luge World Cup finish was 15th in men's doubles in 2007–08.

Makhnutin's best finish at the FIL World Luge Championships was 16th in the men's doubles event twice (2007, 2008). He also finished 12th in the men's doubles event at the 2008 FIL European Luge Championships in Cesana.

Makhutin also qualified for the 2010 Winter Olympics where he finished tenth.
