= Samuel Edney =

Canadian luger (born 1984)

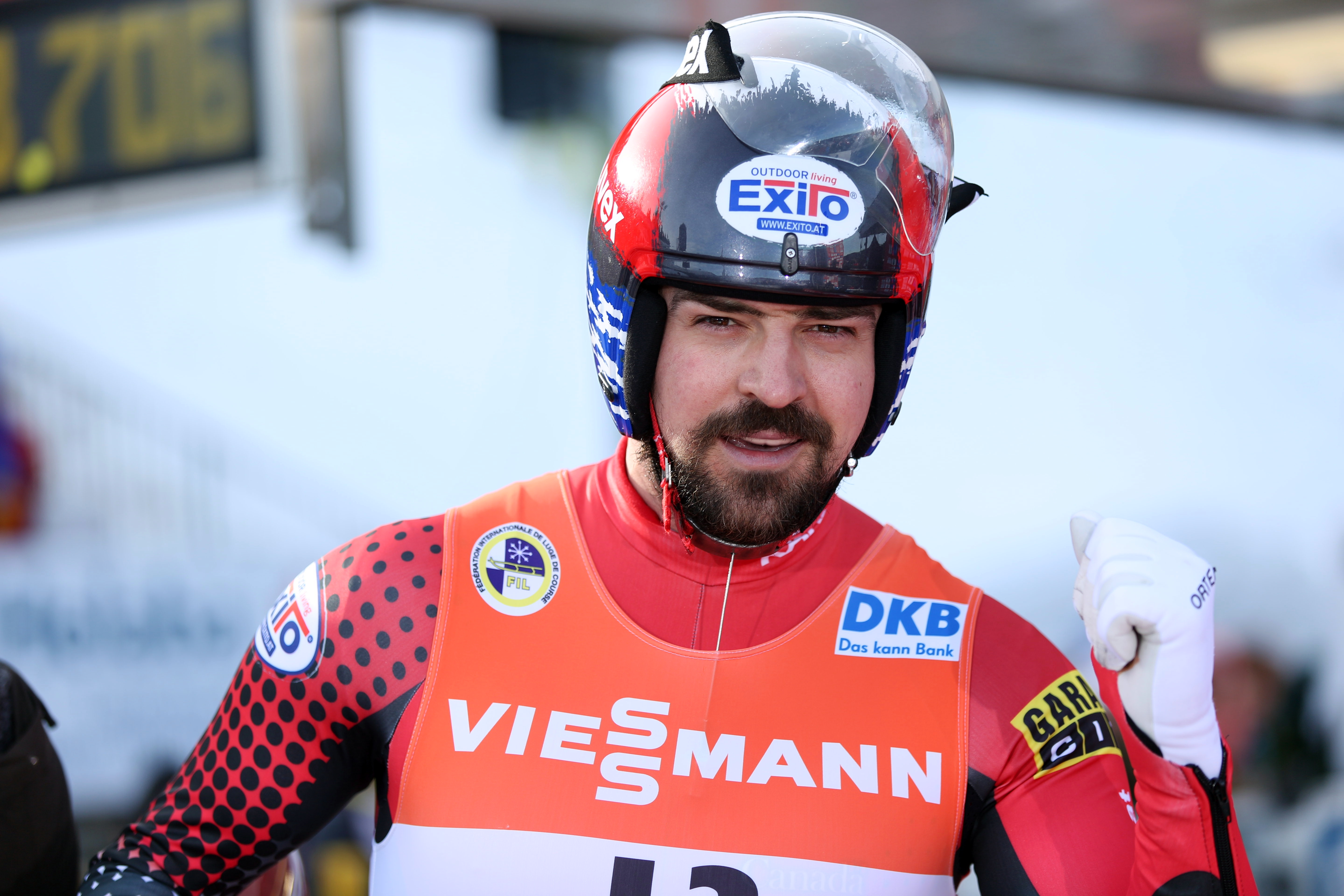

Personal information
- Born: June 29, 1984 (age 41) Calgary, Alberta, Canada
Medal record
Men's Luge
Representing Canada
Olympic Games
Silver medal – second place	2018 Pyeongchang	Team relay
World Championships
Silver medal – second place	2013 Whistler	Team relay
Bronze medal – third place	2012 Altenberg	Team relay
Bronze medal – third place	2015 Sigulda	Team relay

Samuel "Sam" Edney (born June 29, 1984) is a retired Canadian luger who has competed since 2000. Competing in four Winter Olympics.

== Career ==
=== Early start and Olympic debut ===
Edney got into the sport at the age of 14 and began competing at the 2000 Canadian Junior Championship in Calgary. In 2004, Edney would return to Calgary to win second place in doubles at the Junior World Cup Champs.

In 2006, he made his Olympic debut in Turin, finishing nineteenth overall. At the Vancouver Winter Olympics, Edney placed seventh.

In 2012, Edney was part of the Canadian team that won Bronze at the World Championships. A year later, he would have his best placement, earning Silver at the 2013 World Championships.

=== 2014 Sochi Olympics ===
In 2014, Edney was part of the team that placed fourth in the team relay at the Sochi Winter Olympics. In late 2017, the Russian team that placed second was stripped of their medals due to a doping scandal. This temporarily promoted the Canadian team's finish to bronze. In early 2018, the IOC's decision to strip the Russians of their medals was overturned, thus placing the Canadian team back in fourth place.

Later in 2014, Edney would place first male singles at the World Cup, securing Canada's first World Cup win. In 2015, he would win another bronze at the World Championships.

=== 2018 Pyeongchang Olympics ===
In Pyeongchang, Sam contended for a medal, but ended up sixth, the best ever Men's Singles Olympic showing for Canada. He was less than a tenth of a second outside of a medal. A few days later however, he along with teammates Alex Gough, Tristan Walker, and Justin Snith took home silver in the Team relay.
