= Nina Reithmayer =

Austrian luger

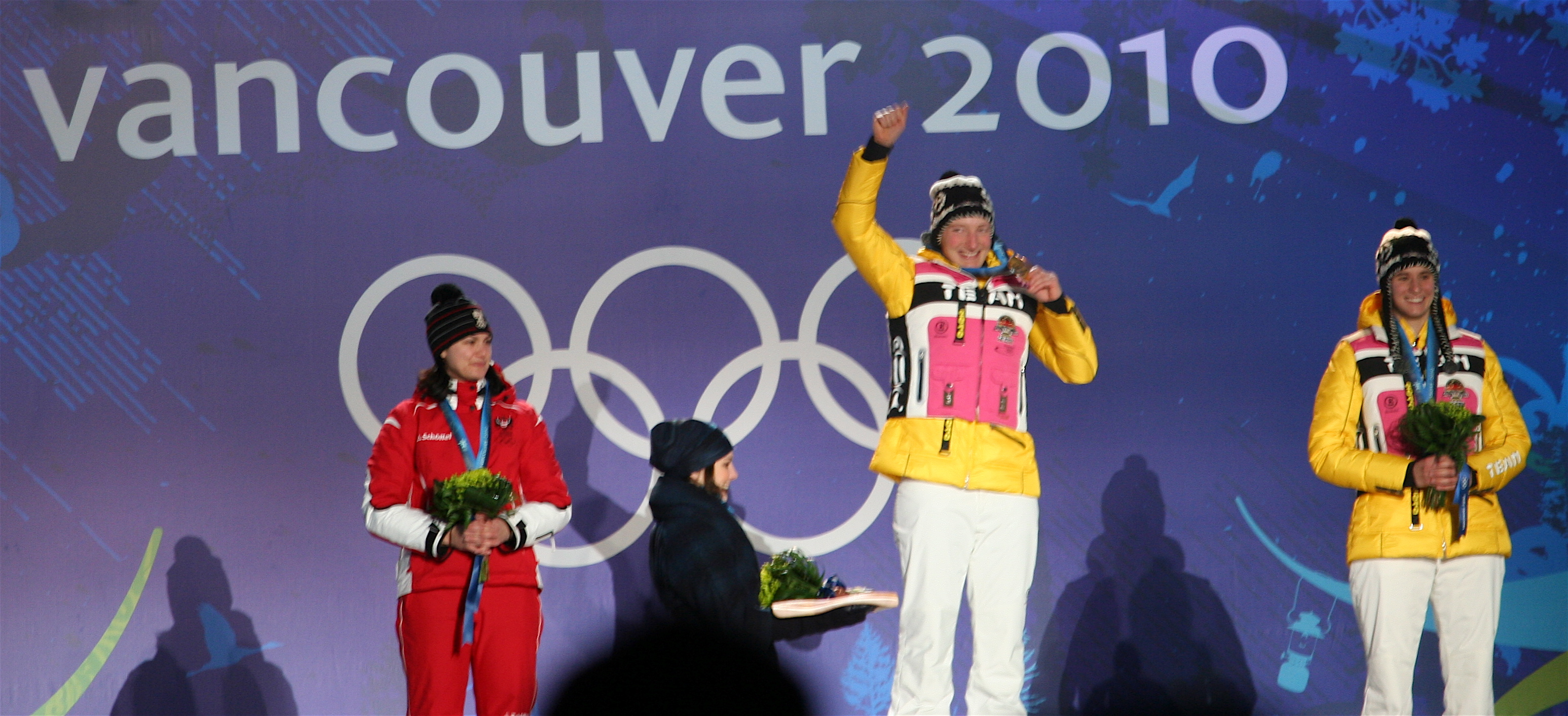
- Reithmayer (left) at the 2010 Winter Olympics

Medal record

Luge

Olympic Games
Silver medal – second place	2010 Vancouver	Women's singles

World Championships
Silver medal – second place	2008 Oberhof	Mixed team
Silver medal – second place	2009 Lake Placid	Mixed team
Bronze medal – third place	2007 Igls	Mixed team

European Championships
Bronze medal – third place	2010 Sigulda	Women's singles

Nina Reithmayer (born 8 June 1984 in Innsbruck) is an Austrian luger who has competed since 2002. Competing in two Winter Olympics, she won a silver medal in the women's singles event at Vancouver in 2010.

Reithmeyer also earned a bronze in the women's singles event at the FIL European Luge Championships 2010 in Sigulda. Her best finish at the FIL World Luge Championships was sixth in the women's singles event at Oberhof in 2008.
