= Viktor Kneib =

Russian luger (born 1980)

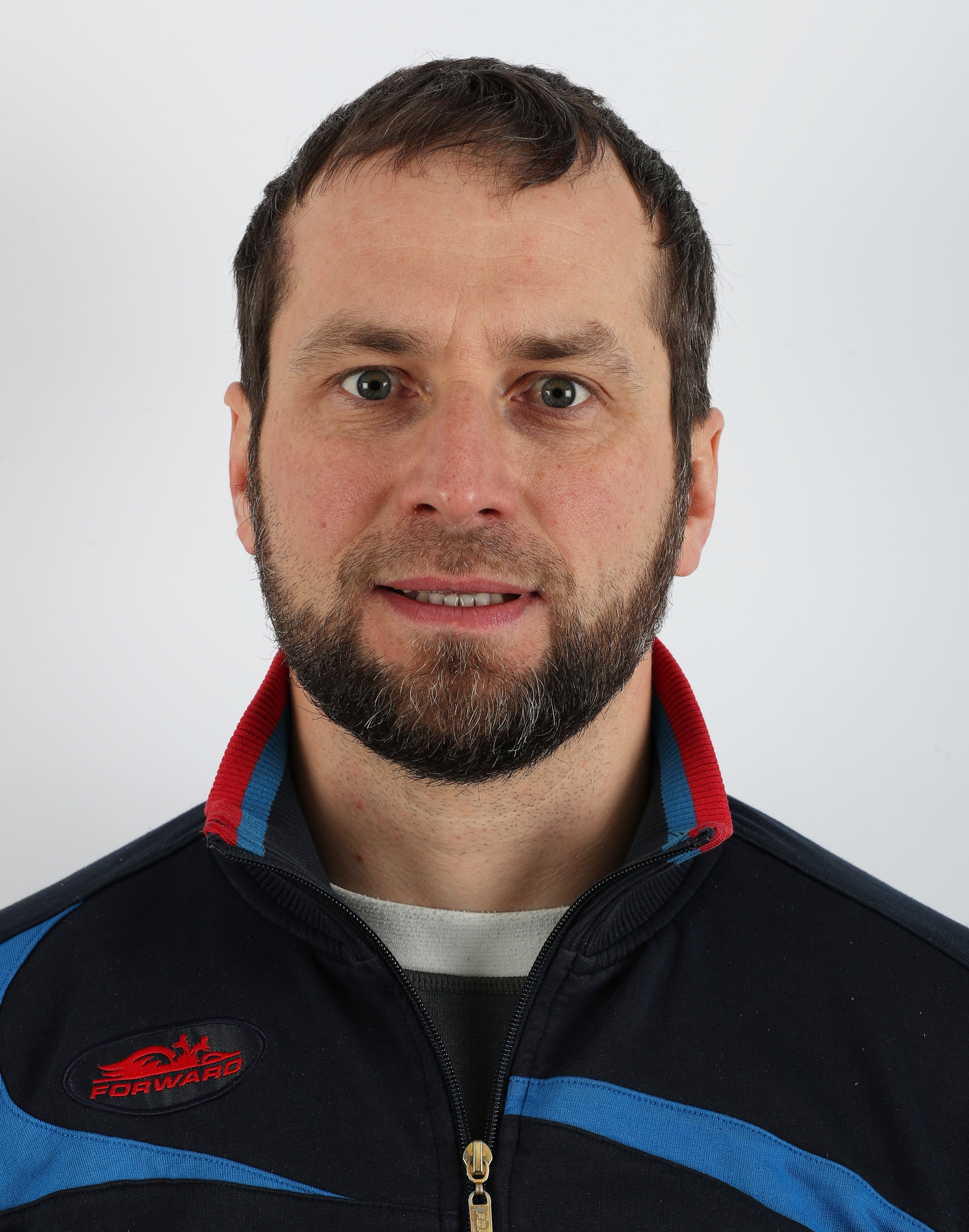

Viktor Ivanovich Kneyb (Russian: Виктор Иванович Кнейб; born 19 April 1980 in Bratsk) is a Russian luger who has competed since the late 1990s. Competing in four Winter Olympics, he earned his best finish of 9th in the men's doubles event at Nagano in 1998.

Kneib's best finish at the FIL World Luge Championships was eighth in men's singles at Igls in 2007. His best finish at the FIL European Luge Championships was sixth in men's singles at Winterberg in 2006.
