= David Mair (artificial track luger) =

Italian luger (born 1984)

David Mair (born 21 August 1984 in Sterzing) is an Italian artificial track luger who has competed since 2003.

Mair's best finish at the FIL European Luge Championships was 12th in the men's singles event at Winterberg in 2006. His best finish at the FIL World Luge Championships was ninth in the men's singles event at Lake Placid, New York, in 2009.

Mair qualified for the 2010 Winter Olympics where he finished 17th.
