= Gregory Carigiet =

Swiss luger (born 1987)

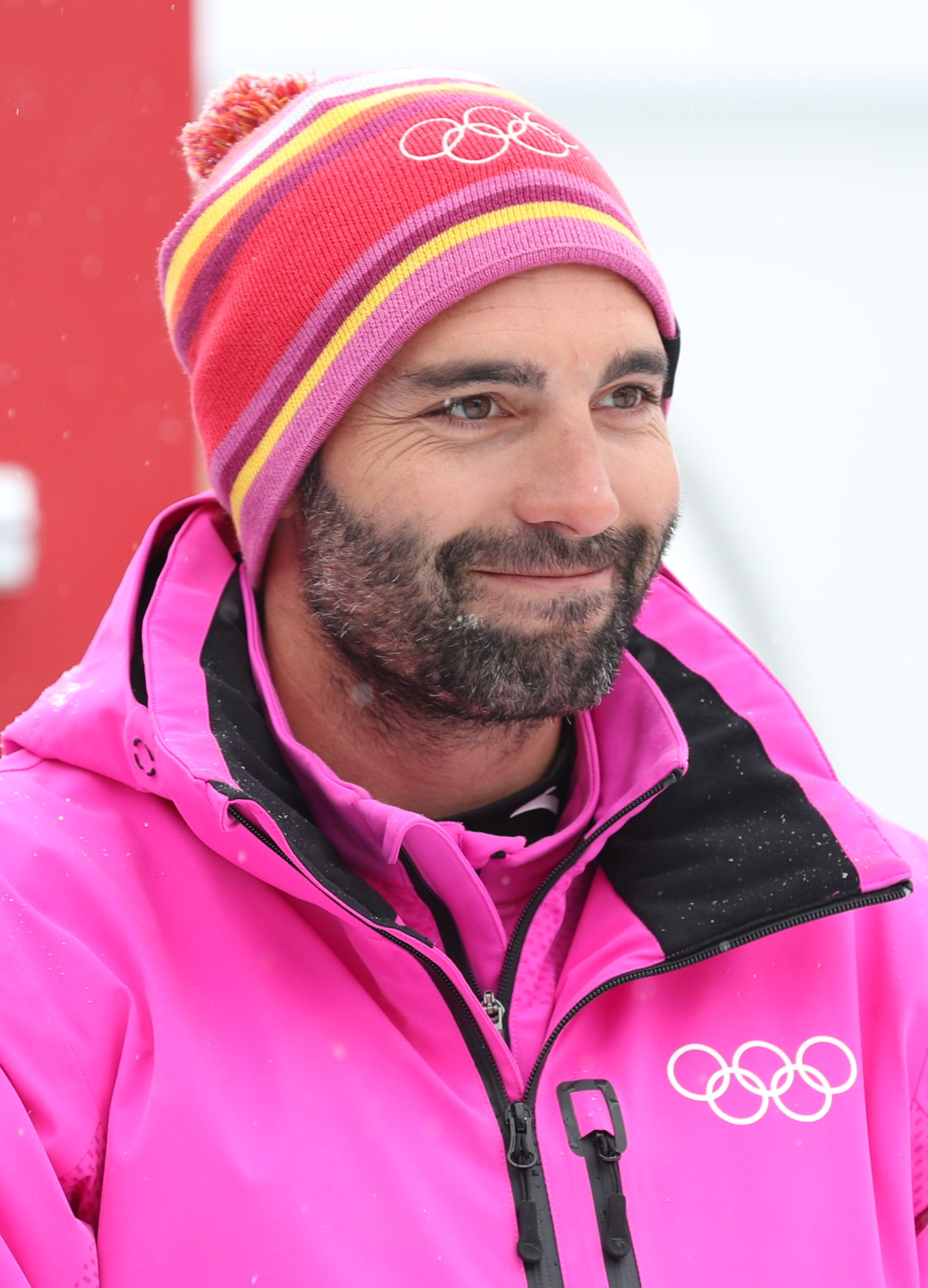
Gregory Carigiet (2020)

Gregory Carigeiet (born 8 March 1987) is a Swiss luger who has competed since 1999.

Carigiet finished 17th in the men's singles event at a World Cup event in Calgary on 21 November 2009. Carigeiet has finished 15th at the FIL World Luge Championships in 2007, 2011, and 2012.
