= Alexandra Rodionova =

Russian bobsledder and former luger (born 1984)

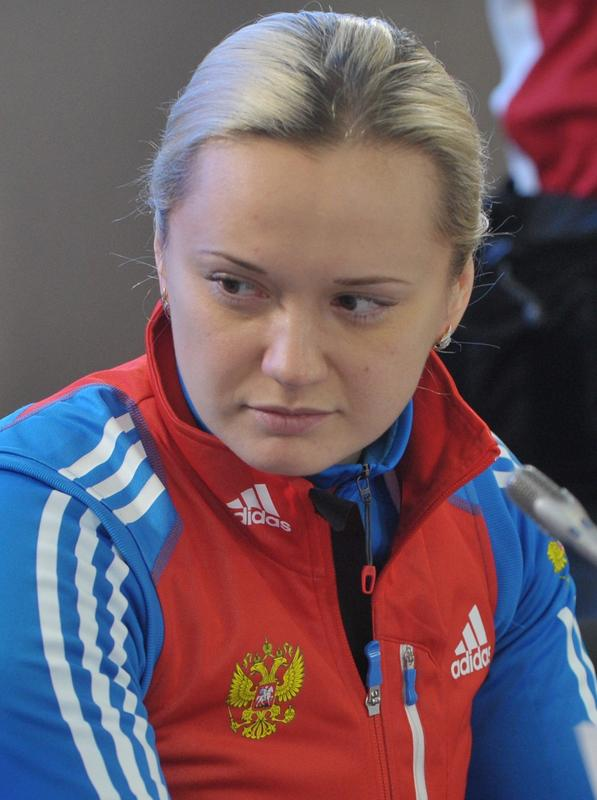
- Rodionova in 2012

Personal information
- Full name: Alexandra Vasiliyevna Rodionova
- Born: 2 January 1984 (age 42) Bratsk, Russia

Sport
- Country: Russia
- Sport: Bobsleigh, Luge
Medal record
Bobsleigh
Representing Russia
World Championships
Disqualified	2015 Winterberg	Mixed team
Disqualified	2016 Igls	Mixed team

Alexandra Vasiliyevna Rodionova (Russian: Александра Васильевна Родионова; born 2 January 1984) is a Russian bobsledder and former luger who has competed since 2003. Competing in two Winter Olympics, she earned her best finish of sixth in the women's singles event at Vancouver in 2010.

Rodionova's best finish at the FIL World Luge Championships was 11th in the women's singles event at Lake Placid, New York, in 2009. Her best finish at the FIL European Luge Championships was ninth in the women's singles event at Sigulda in 2010.
