= Arianne Jones =

Canadian luger (born 1990)

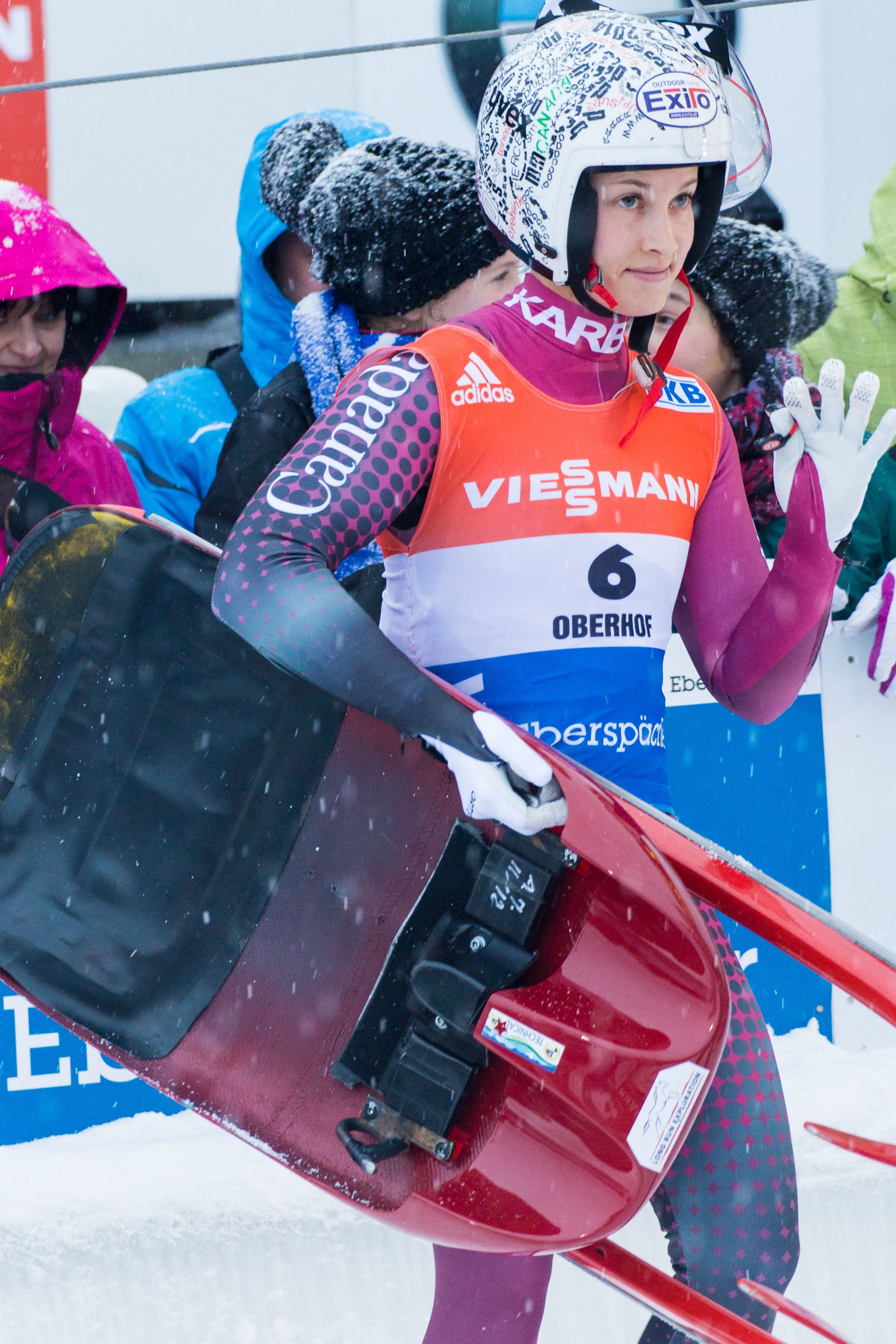
- Arianne Jones at the 2015-16 Luge World Cup

Personal information
- Born: September 21, 1990 (age 36) Calgary, Alberta, Canada
- Height: 1.63 m (5 ft 4 in)
- Weight: 59 kg (130 lb)

Sport
- Country: Canada
- Sport: Luge

Arianne Jones (born September 21, 1990) is a Canadian luger who has competed since 2005. Jones has also qualified to compete for Canada at the 2014 Winter Olympics in Sochi, Russia by winning a last chance race off with another teammate. She placed 13th overall in the 2014 Olympic Games, with other achievements including a bronze medal in the 2014 Calgary Luge World Cup and a gold medal in the Team Relay portion of 2016 Winterberg Luge World Cup in Germany.

== Career ==
Jones attributes her start in luge to a recruitment camp held at Canada Olympic Park, following the 2002 Winter Olympics in Park City, Utah. Beginning her career at the age of twelve, she worked her way to an elite level through competing in junior national competitions for four years, reaching World Cup level in the 2010–2011 season.

With a stature smaller than many of her competitors, Jones was dubbed the "pint-sized wonder" by many of her peers. Jones boasted top-fifteen World Cup results every season since her debut in 2010.
