= Preston Griffall =

American luger (born 1984)

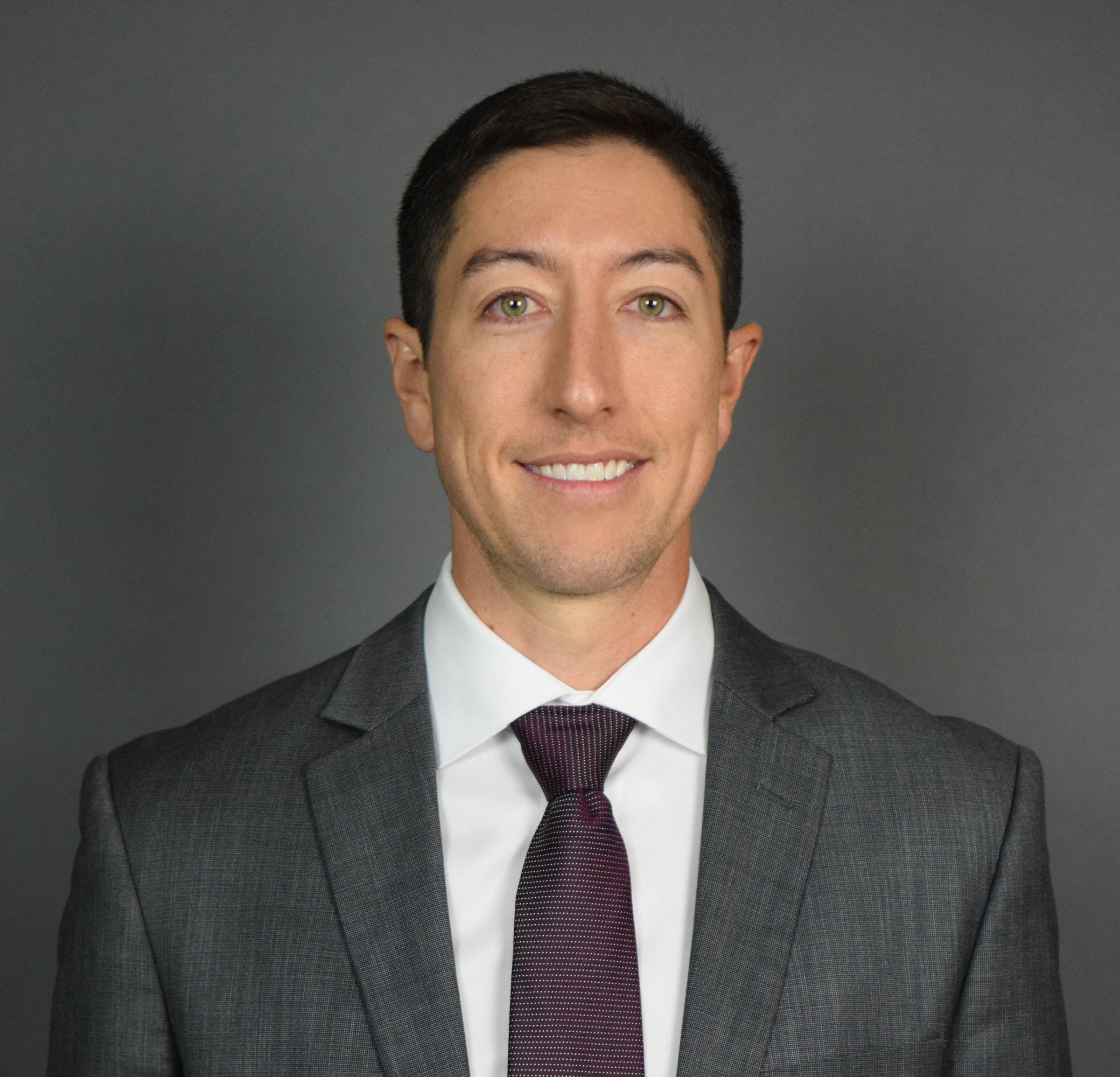
- Griffall in 2018

Personal information
- Born: June 6, 1984 (age 42) Salt Lake City, Utah, U.S.
- Height: 5 ft 10 in (1.78 m)
- Weight: 154 lb (70 kg)

Sport
- Country: United States
- Sport: Luge
- Club: U.S. Army

Preston Griffall (born June 6, 1984) is an American luger who has competed since 1995. He finished 8th and 14th in the doubles event at the 2006 and 2014 Olympics, respectively. Griffall's best finish at the FIL World Luge Championships was 6th in the doubles at Park City, Utah, in 2005.

A native of Salt Lake City, Utah, Griffall co-owns a landscaping business in Lake Placid, New York, with fellow American luger Jonathan Myles. While still owning a landscaping business he still finds time to train for upcoming races.

Griffall is also currently in the United States National Guard in the state of Utah. He completed Basic Combat Training in Fort Leonard Wood, Missouri, and Advanced Individual Training in Fort Jackson, South Carolina. He serves as a 42A – Human Resources Specialist.

Griffall competed in the 2015 season of American Ninja Warrior where he made it to the Las Vegas finals, but fell just before finishing Stage 1.
