= Andrei Anghel =

Romanian luger (born 1989)

Andrei Anghel (born 17 November 1989) is a Romanian luger who has competed since 2004. His best finish at the FIL World Luge Championships was 16th in the men's doubles event at Lake Placid, New York, in 2009.

Anghel qualified for the 2010 Winter Olympics where he finished 20th in the doubles event.
