= Patrick Schwienbacher =

Italian luger (born 1982)

Patrick Schwienbacher (born 2 November 1982) is an Italian luger who has been competing since 1997. His best Luge World Cup season finish was 18th twice (2005–06, 2006-07).

Schwienbacher's best finish at the FIL World Luge Championships was 16th in the men's singles event at Park City in 2005. His best finish at the FIL European Luge Championships was 19th in the men's singles event twice (2004, 2008).
