= Ján Harniš =

Slovak luger

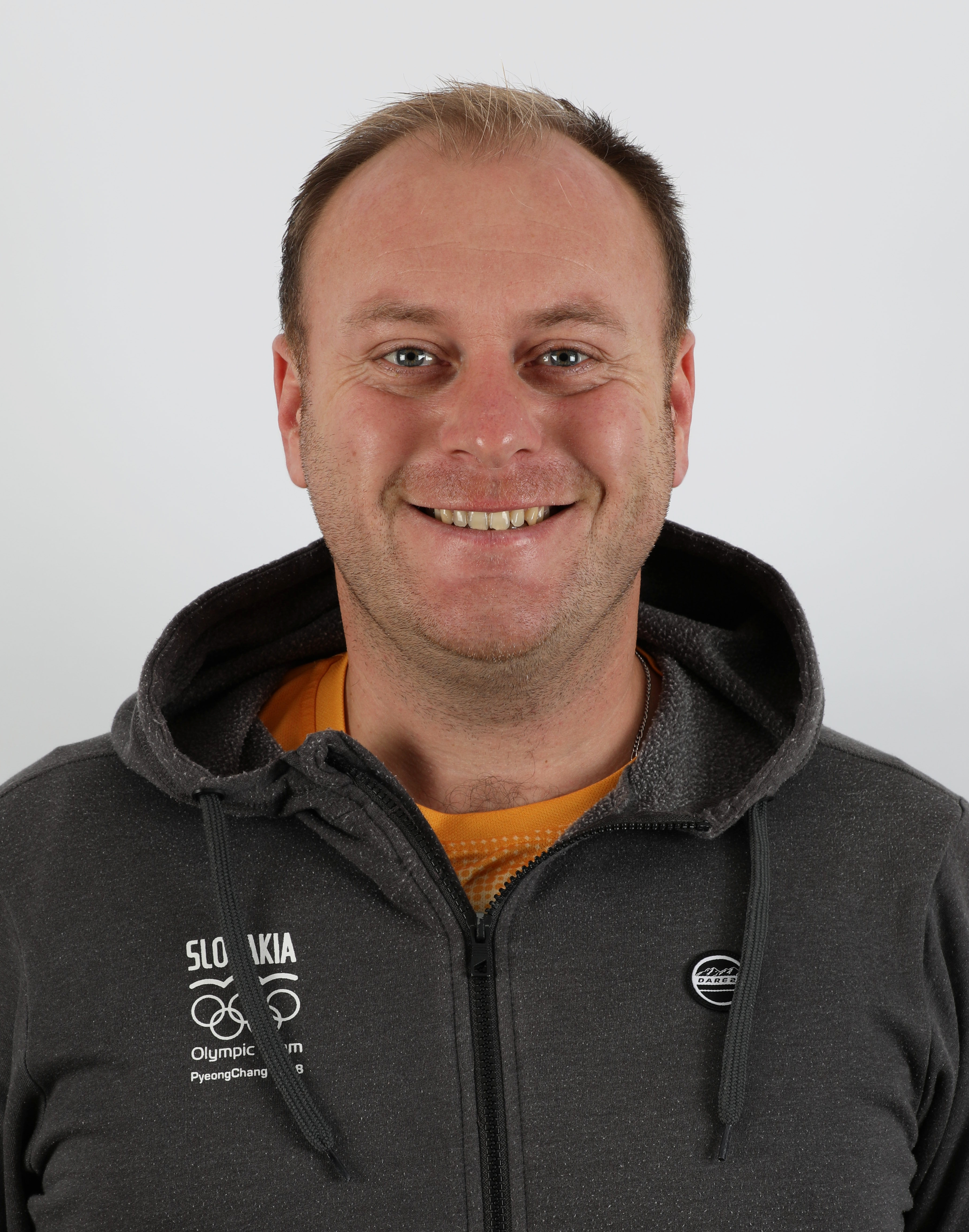
Ján Harniš in 2018

Ján Harniš (born 13 April 1985 in Poprad) is a Slovak luger who has competed since 2004. His best Luge World Cup season finish was 18th in men's doubles in 2006-07.

Harniš' best finish at the FIL World Luge Championships was 13th in men's doubles at Lake Placid, New York, in 2009. His best finish at the FIL European Luge Championships was 11th in men's doubles at Sigulda in 2010.

Harniš finished 11th in the men's doubles event at the 2010 Winter Olympics in Vancouver.
