= Manuel Pfister =

Austrian luger (born 1988)

Manuel Pfister (born 4 December 1988) is an Austrian luger who has competed since 1999. His best finish at the FIL World Luge Championships was 17th in the men's singles event at Oberhof in 2008.

Pfister's best finish at the FIL European Luge Championships was seventh in the men's singles event at Sigulda in 2010.

He qualified for the 2010 Winter Olympics, finishing tenth.

He was talked about in an episode of the BBC Three topical comedy programme Russell Howard's Good News.
