= Paul Ifrim =

Romanian luger (born 1988)

Paul Ifrim (born 26 July 1988) is a Romanian luger who has competed since 2004. His best finish at the FIL World Luge Championships was 16th in the men's doubles event at Lake Placid, New York, in 2009.

Ifrim qualified for the 2010 Winter Olympics where he finished 20th.

In 2012/2013 Luge season he finished 3rd in Lake Placid (USA) Nations Cup.

Ifrim suffered an injury in October 2013 during trainings in Germany right before the World Cup qualification criteria started. He had a plate fixation on his left clavicle and had to stop his journey for 2014 Sochi Olympics.

In 2014/2015 he competed in the first part of the season where he came 3rd in the Nation's Cup in Calgary (CAN) and 10th at the first World Cup of the season in Innsbruck (AUT).

As of 2026, he is the athletics director at Lanna International School.
