= 2016 FIL World Luge Championships – Women's singles =

Women's singles at the 2016 FIL World Luge Championships
- Venue: Königssee bobsleigh, luge, and skeleton track, Königssee
- Date: 30 January 2016
- Competitors: 40 from 16 nations
- Winning time: 1:40.799

Medalists
gold medal	Natalie Geisenberger	Germany
silver medal	Martina Kocher	Switzerland
bronze medal	Tatiana Ivanova	Russia

2016 FIL World Luge Championships
Singles	men		women
Doubles	doubles
Sprint	men	doubles	women
Relay		mixed

The Women's singles race of the 2016 FIL World Luge Championships was held on 30 January 2016.

== Results ==
The first run will be started at 15:23 and the final run at 17:07.

Rank	Bib	Name	Country	Run 1	Rank	Run 2	Rank	Total	Diff
1st place, gold medalist(s)	5	Natalie Geisenberger	Germany	50.390	1	50.409	1	1:40.799	
2nd place, silver medalist(s)	4	Martina Kocher	Switzerland	50.418	3	50.620	3	1:41.038	+0.239
3rd place, bronze medalist(s)	1	Tatiana Ivanova	Russia	50.441	5	50.614	2	1:41.055	+0.256
4	9	Tatjana Hüfner	Germany	50.406	2	50.650	5	1:41.056	+0.257
5	6	Elīza Cauce	Latvia	50.516	6	50.638	4	1:41.154	+0.355
6	13	Julia Taubitz	Germany	50.630	7	50.925	10	1:41.555	+0.756
7	10	Summer Britcher	United States	50.755	11	50.806	7	1:41.561	+0.762
8	11	Erin Hamlin	United States	50.867	13	50.703	6	1:41.570	+0.771
9	7	Alex Gough	Canada	50.754	10	50.822	8	1:41.576	+0.777
10	2	Victoria Demchenko	Russia	50.671	8	50.937	11	1:41.608	+0.809
11	8	Kimberley McRae	Canada	50.717	9	50.895	9	1:41.612	+0.813
12	18	Ekaterina Baturina	Russia	50.934	14	51.029	12	1:41.963	+1.164
13	14	Arianne Jones	Canada	50.864	12	51.135	14	1:41.999	+1.200
14	12	Emily Sweeney	United States	51.112	15	51.127	13	1:42.239	+1.440
15	15	Sandra Robatscher	Italy	51.229	17	51.189	16	1:42.418	+1.619
16	16	Birgit Platzer	Austria	51.365	20	51.161	15	1:42.526	+1.727
17	20	Andrea Vötter	Italy	51.215	16	51.329	19	1:42.544	+1.745
18	22	Madeleine Egle	Austria	51.334	18	51.245	17	1:42.579	+1.780
19	19	Ewa Kuls	Poland	51.340	19	51.304	18	1:42.644	+1.845
20	3	Dajana Eitberger	Germany	50.433	4	52.656	20	1:43.089	+2.290
21	32	Katrin Heinzelmaier	Austria	51.521	21			51.521	
22	23	Raluca Strămăturaru	Romania	51.540	22			51.540	
23	25	Sung Eun-ryung	South Korea	51.551	23			51.551	
24	26	Ekaterina Katnikova	Russia	51.713	24			51.713	
25	40	Choi Eun-ju	South Korea	51.729	25			51.729	
26	24	Raychel Germaine	United States	51.836	26			51.836	
27	38	Gry Martine Mostue	Norway	51.851	27			51.851	
28	30	Karoline Melas	Norway	52.128	28			52.128	
29	35	Daria Obratov	Croatia	52.178	29			52.178	
30	27	Viera Gburova	Slovakia	52.298	30			52.298	
31	34	Tereza Nosková	Czech Republic	52.354	31			52.354	
31	28	Natalie Maag	Switzerland	52.354	31			52.354	
33	39	Olena Stetskiv	Ukraine	52.356	33			52.356	
34	36	Anastasia Polusytok	Ukraine	52.364	34			52.364	
35	37	Olena Shkhumova	Ukraine	52.407	35			52.407	
36	17	Natalia Wojtuściszyn	Poland	52.428	36			52.428	
37	29	Ulla Zirne	Latvia	52.579	37			52.579	
38	33	Katarina Šimoňáková	Slovakia	53.036	38			53.036	
39	31	Jung Hye-sun	South Korea	54.446	39			54.446	
	21	Miriam Kastlunger	Austria	DNF					
