= 2015 FIL World Luge Championships – Women's singles =

Women's singles at the 2015 FIL World Luge Championships
- Venue: Sigulda bobsleigh, luge, and skeleton track, Sigulda
- Date: 14 February 2015
- Competitors: 40 from 16 nations
- Winning time: 1:24.142

Medalists
gold medal	Natalie Geisenberger	Germany
silver medal	Tatiana Ivanova	Russia
bronze medal	Tatjana Hüfner	Germany

2015 FIL World Luge Championships
Individual	men		women
Doubles	doubles
Relay		mixed

The Women's singles race of the 2015 FIL World Luge Championships was held on 14 February 2015.

== Results ==
The first run was started at 12:36 and the second run at 14:15.

Rank	Bib	Name	Country	Run 1	Rank	Run 2	Rank	Total	Diff
1st place, gold medalist(s)	10	Natalie Geisenberger	Germany	42.014	1	42.128	1	1:24.142	
2nd place, silver medalist(s)	11	Tatiana Ivanova	Russia	42.229	3	42.229	2	1:24.458	+0.316
3rd place, bronze medalist(s)	3	Tatjana Hüfner	Germany	42.215	2	42.248	3	1:24.463	+0.321
4	15	Erin Hamlin	United States	42.241	4	42.268	4	1:24.509	+0.367
5	1	Alex Gough	Canada	42.288	5	42.328	5	1:24.616	+0.474
6	5	Dajana Eitberger	Germany	42.324	7	42.329	6	1:24.653	+0.511
7	9	Anke Winschnewski	Germany	42.364	9	42.359	8	1:24.723	+0.581
8	14	Ekaterina Katnikova	Russia	42.308	6	42.421	11	1:24.729	+0.587
9	6	Summer Britcher	United States	42.413	11	42.347	7	1:24.760	+0.618
10	13	Natalia Khoreva	Russia	42.357	8	42.445	12	1:24.802	+0.660
11	8	Ekaterina Baturina	Russia	42.432	12	42.391	9	1:24.823	+0.681
12	12	Kimberley McRae	Canada	42.616	15	42.406	10	1:25.022	+0.880
13	2	Elīza Tīruma	Latvia	42.398	10	42.709	17	1:25.107	+0.965
14	7	Arianne Jones	Canada	42.582	14	42.533	13	1:25.115	+0.973
15	21	Miriam Kastlunger	Austria	42.531	13	42.635	15	1:25.166	+1.024
16	4	Martina Kocher	Switzerland	42.639	16	42.591	14	1:25.230	+1.088
17	17	Julia Clukey	United States	42.736	17	42.642	16	1:25.378	+1.236
18	18	Andrea Vötter	Italy	42.835	20	42.760	18	1:25.595	+1.453
19	20	Natalia Wojtuściszyn	Poland	42.825	19	43.363	19	1:26.188	+2.046
20	26	Ewa Kuls	Poland	42.836	21			42.836	
21	25	Raluca Strămăturaru	Romania	42.899	22			42.899	
22	16	Emily Sweeney	United States	42.909	23			42.909	
23	22	Viera Gburova	Slovakia	43.035	24			43.035	
24	28	Sung Eun-ryung	South Korea	43.053	25			43.053	
25	31	Olena Stetskiv	Ukraine	43.127	26			43.127	
26	24	Kendija Apariode	Latvia	43.132	27			43.132	
27	37	Birgit Platzer	Austria	43.139	28			43.139	
28	30	Nina Prock	Austria	43.163	29			43.163	
29	39	Daria Obratov	Croatia	43.324	30			43.324	
30	34	Dariya Gula	Ukraine	43.387	31			43.387	
31	32	Choi Eun-ju	South Korea	43.405	32			43.405	
32	33	Katarína Šimoňáková	Slovakia	43.606	33			43.606	
33	35	Alise Mitkus	Latvia	43.975	34			43.975	
34	40	Anastasia Polustyok	Ukraine	44.395	35			44.395	
35	36	Danielle Scott	Great Britain	44.432	36			44.432	
36	27	Madalina Rosca	Romania	46.248	37			46.248	
37	38	Olena Shkhumova	Ukraine	1:01.224	38			1:01.224	
–	19	Ulla Zirne	Latvia	42.773	18	DNF			
–	23	Gry Mostue	Norway	DNF					
–	29	Sandra Robatscher	Italy	DNF					
