= 2017 FIL European Luge Championships – Women's singles =

Women's singles at the 2017 FIL European Luge Championships
- Venue: Königssee bobsleigh, luge, and skeleton track
- Location: Königssee, Germany
- Dates: 5 January
- Winning time: 51.178

Medalists
gold medal	Natalie Geisenberger	Germany
silver medal	Tatiana Ivanova	Russia
bronze medal	Tatjana Hüfner	Germany

The women's singles competition at the 2017 FIL European Luge Championships was held on 5 January 2017.

== Competition schedule ==
All times are (UTC+1).

Date	Time	Event
5 February	14:25	Run 1

== Results ==
One run was used to determine the winner because the second run got delayed.

Rank	Bib	Athlete	Country	Time	Behind
1st place, gold medalist(s)	23	Natalie Geisenberger	Germany	51.178	—
2nd place, silver medalist(s)	12	Tatiana Ivanova	Russia	51.329	+0.151
3rd place, bronze medalist(s)	24	Tatjana Hüfner	Germany	51.433	+0.255
4	7	Martina Kocher	Switzerland	51.466	+0.288
5	10	Miriam Kastlunger	Austria	51.587	+0.409
6	11	Elīza Cauce	Latvia	51.770	+0.592
7	16	Birgit Platzer	Austria	51.808	+0.630
8	15	Julia Taubitz	Germany	52.090	+0.912
9	9	Andrea Vötter	Italy	52.101	+0.923
10	2	Victoria Demchenko	Russia	52.109	+0.931
11	18	Dajana Eitberger	Germany	52.116	+0.938
12	4	Madeleine Egle	Austria	52.130	+0.952
13	8	Ewa Kuls-Kusyk	Poland	52.268	+1.090
14	13	Ekaterina Baturina	Russia	52.600	+1.422
15	6	Sandra Robatscher	Italy	52.912	+1.734
16	5	Ulla Zirne	Latvia	53.091	+1.913
17	1	Olena Stetskiv	Ukraine	53.308	+2.130
18		Kendija Aparjode	Latvia	Did not qualify via Nationscup	
19		Ekaterina Katnikova	Russia	Did not qualify via Nationscup	
20		Natalie Maag	Switzerland	Did not qualify via Nationscup	
21		Raluca Strămăturaru	Romania	Did not qualify via Nationscup	
22		Tereza Nosková	Czech Republic	Did not qualify via Nationscup	
23		Karoline Melas	Norway	Did not qualify via Nationscup	
24		Daria Obratov	Croatia	Did not qualify via Nationscup	
25		Dariya Gula	Ukraine	Did not qualify via Nationscup	
26		Danielle Louise Scott	Great Britain	Did not qualify via Nationscup	
27		Simona Zmijová	Slovakia	Did not qualify via Nationscup	
28		Margot Boch	France	Did not qualify via Nationscup	
29		Natalia Wojtuściszyn	Poland	Did not qualify via Nationscup	
		Cezara Curmei	Romania	Did not qualify via Nationscup	
		Tove Kohala	Sweden	Did not qualify via Nationscup	
		Olena Shkhumova	Ukraine	Did not qualify via Nationscup	
