= 2016 FIL World Luge Championships – Women's sprint =

Women's sprint at the 2016 FIL World Luge Championships
- Venue: Königssee bobsleigh, luge, and skeleton track, Königssee
- Date: 29 January
- Competitors: 40 from 16 nations
- Winning time: 39.451

Medalists
gold medal	Martina Kocher	Switzerland
silver medal	Natalie Geisenberger	Germany
bronze medal	Dajana Eitberger	Germany

2016 FIL World Luge Championships
Singles	men		women
Doubles	doubles
Sprint	men	doubles	women
Relay		mixed

The Women's sprint race of the 2016 FIL World Luge Championships was held on 29 January 2016.

== Results ==
The qualification run was started at 10:07 and the final run at 15:16.

Rank	Bib	Name	Country	Qualification	Rank	Final	Rank	Diff
1st place, gold medalist(s)	1	Martina Kocher	Switzerland	39.578	9	39.451	1	
2nd place, silver medalist(s)	15	Natalie Geisenberger	Germany	39.274	2	39.486	2	+0.035
3rd place, bronze medalist(s)	14	Dajana Eitberger	Germany	39.233	1	39.537	3	+0.086
4	13	Summer Britcher	United States	39.404	4	39.594	4	+0.143
5	11	Tatjana Hüfner	Germany	39.376	3	39.598	5	+0.147
6	2	Julia Taubitz	Germany	39.508	7	39.641	6	+0.190
7	10	Tatiana Ivanova	Russia	39.435	5	39.646	7	+0.195
8	8	Elīza Tīruma	Latvia	39.567	8	39.698	8	+0.247
9	31	Natalia Wojtuściszyn	Poland	39.797	14	39.701	9	+0.250
10	7	Alex Gough	Canada	39.732	13	39.727	10	+0.276
11	6	Kimberley McRae	Canada	39.586	10	39.840	11	+0.389
12	12	Erin Hamlin	United States	39.493	6	39.869	12	+0.418
13	3	Ekaterina Baturina	Russia	39.656	12	39.914	13	+0.463
14	22	Arianne Jones	Canada	39.897	15	40.082	14	+0.631
15	5	Miriam Kastlunger	Austria	39.586	10	40.101	15	+0.650
16	17	Andrea Vötter	Italy	39.950	16			
17	19	Raluca Strămăturaru	Romania	39.961	17			
18	21	Birgit Platzer	Austria	40.004	18			
19	9	Emily Sweeney	United States	40.099	19			
20	38	Madeleine Egle	Austria	40.273	20			
21	28	Ekaterina Katnikova	Russia	40.277	21			
22	26	Gry Martine Mostue	Norway	40.310	22			
23	36	Viera Gburova	Slovakia	40.367	23			
24	32	Sung Eun-ryung	South Korea	40.380	24			
25	29	Ulla Zirne	Latvia	40.398	25			
26	30	Ewa Kuls	Poland	40.431	26			
27	27	Karoline Melas	Norway	40.552	27			
28	37	Choi Eun-ju	South Korea	40.586	28			
29	16	Raychel Germaine	United States	40.734	29			
30	40	Katarina Šimoňáková	Slovakia	40.762	30			
31	24	Tereza Nosková	Czech Republic	40.843	31			
32	23	Daria Obratov	Croatia	40.847	32			
33	34	Jung Hye-sun	South Korea	40.856	33			
34	25	Olena Stetskiv	Ukraine	41.637	34			
35	39	Natalie Maag	Switzerland	41.860	35			
36	33	Olena Shkhumova	Ukraine	42.223	36			
	20	Katrin Heinzelmaier	Austria		DNF			
	18	Sandra Robatscher	Italy		DNF			
	4	Victoria Demchenko	Russia		DNF			
	35	Anastasia Polusytok	Ukraine		DNF			
