= 2015 FIL World Luge Championships – Team relay =

Team relay at the 2015 FIL World Luge Championships
- Venue: Sigulda bobsleigh, luge, and skeleton track, Sigulda
- Date: 15 February 2015
- Competitors: 36 from 12 nations
- Winning time: 2:13.152

Medalists
gold medal	Natalie Geisenberger; Felix Loch; Tobias Wendl; Tobias Arlt	Germany
silver medal	Tatiana Ivanova; Semen Pavlichenko; Andrey Bogdanov; Andrey Medvedev	Russia
bronze medal	Alex Gough; Samuel Edney; Tristan Walker; Justin Snith	Canada

2015 FIL World Luge Championships
Individual	men		women
Doubles	doubles
Relay		mixed

The Team relay race of the 2015 FIL World Luge Championships was held on 15 February 2015.

== Results ==
The race was started at 14:08.

Rank	Bib	Country	Athletes	Women	Men	Doubles	Total	Diff
1st place, gold medalist(s)	12	Germany	Natalie Geisenberger; Felix Loch; Tobias Wendl/Tobias Arlt	43.089	44.907	45.156	2:13.152	
2nd place, silver medalist(s)	11	Russia	Tatiana Ivanova; Semen Pavlichenko; Andrey Bogdanov/Andrey Medvedev	43.296	44.732	45.206	2:13.234	+0.082
3rd place, bronze medalist(s)	7	Canada	Alex Gough; Samuel Edney; Tristan Walker/Justin Snith	43.554	44.929	45.646	2:14.129	+0.977
4	6	Italy	Andrea Vötter; Dominik Fischnaller; Christian Oberstolz/Patrick Gruber	43.834	45.139	45.331	2:14.304	+1.153
5	9	United States	Erin Hamlin; Chris Mazdzer; Matthew Mortensen/Jayson Terdiman	43.448	44.891	46.203	2:14.542	+1.390
6	10	Austria	Miriam Kastlunger; Wolfgang Kindl; Peter Penz/Georg Fischler	44.562	44.929	45.142	2:14.633	+1.481
7	8	Latvia	Elīza Tīruma; Riks Rozitis; Andris Šics/Juris Šics	44.583	44.980	45.227	2:14.790	+1.638
8	4	Slovakia	Viera Gburova; Jozef Ninis; Jakub Šimoňák/Patrik Tomasko	44.095	45.193	46.875	2:16.163	+3.011
9	5	Poland	Natalia Wojtuściszyn; Maciej Kurowski; Artur Gędzius/Jakub Kowalewski	44.598	45.185	46.698	2:16.481	+3.329
10	1	Ukraine	Olena Stetskiv; Andriy Mandziy; Oleksandr Obolonchyk/Roman Zakharkiv	44.284	45.706	47.502	2:17.492	+4.340
	2	South Korea	Sung Eun-ryung; Kim Dong-hyeon; Park Jin-yong/Cho Jung-myung	44.024	45.860	DNF		
	3	Romania	Raluca Strămăturaru; Valentin Crețu; Cosmin Atodirese/Ștefan Musei	44.290	DSQ			
