= Luge at the 2018 Winter Olympics – Women's singles =

Women's singles at the XXIII Olympic Winter Games
- Venue: Alpensia Sliding Centre near Pyeongchang, South Korea
- Dates: 12–13 February 2018
- Competitors: 30 from 16 nations

Medalists
1st place, gold medalist(s)		Natalie Geisenberger	Germany
2nd place, silver medalist(s)		Dajana Eitberger	Germany
3rd place, bronze medalist(s)		Alex Gough	Canada

The women's luge at the 2018 Winter Olympics was held between 12 and 13 February 2018 at the Alpensia Sliding Centre near Pyeongchang, South Korea.

== Summary ==
The defending champion was Natalie Geisenberger; the field also included the 2014 silver medalist and the 2010 champion Tatjana Hüfner and the bronze medalist Erin Hamlin. Geizenberger posted the fastest times in two runs out of four, her competitors were less consistent, and she had no difficulties replicated her 2014 success, becoming the third luger ever won three gold Olympic medals (after her compatriots Georg Hackl and Felix Loch). Dajana Eitberger, who had the fastest last run, took silver, and Alex Gough became the bronze medalist. For Eitberger and Gough, these were their first Olympic medals, and Gough's medal became the first ever Canadian Olympic medal in luge. Tatjana Hüfner, the 2010 Olympic champion and the 2014 silver medalist, had the third time in the first run, but was only sixth in the second run, and eventually only became fourth.

== Qualifying athletes ==
- Verónica María Ravenna (ARG)
- Birgit Platzer (AUT)
- Hannah Prock (AUT)
- Madeleine Egle (AUT)
- Alex Gough (CAN)
- Brooke Apshkrum (CAN)
- Kimberley McRae (CAN)
- Daria Obratov (CRO)
- Tereza Nosková (CZE)
- Dajana Eitberger (GER)
- Natalie Geisenberger (GER)
- Tatjana Hüfner (GER)
- Andrea Vötter (ITA)
- Sandra Robatscher (ITA)
- Aileen Christina Frisch (KOR)
- Sung Eun-ryung (KOR)
- Elīza Cauce (LAT)
- Kendija Aparjode (LAT)
- Ulla Zirne (LAT)
- Ekaterina Baturina (OAR)
- Ewa Kuls-Kusyk (POL)
- Natalia Wojtuściszyn (POL)
- Raluca Strămăturaru (ROU)
- Martina Kocher (SUI)
- Katarina Šimoňáková (SVK)
- Olena Shkhumova (UKR)
- Olena Stetskiv (UKR)
- Emily Sweeney (USA)
- Erin Hamlin (USA)
- Summer Britcher (USA)

== Competition schedule ==
All times are (UTC+9).

Date	Time	Event
12 February	19:50	Run 1
12 February		Run 2
13 February	19:30	Run 3
13 February	21:00	Run 4

== Results ==
Four runs, split over two days, will be used to determine the winner.

Rank	Bib	Athlete	Country	Run 1	Rank	Run 2	Rank	Run 3	Rank	Run 4	Rank	Total	Behind
1st place, gold medalist(s)	6	Natalie Geisenberger	Germany	46.245	1	46.209	3	46.280	1	46.498	2	3:05.232	–
2nd place, silver medalist(s)	5	Dajana Eitberger	Germany	46.381	7	46.193	2	46.577	7	46.448	1	3:05.599	+0.367
3rd place, bronze medalist(s)	11	Alex Gough	Canada	46.317	2	46.328	4	46.425	3	46.574	3	3:05.644	+0.412
4	2	Tatjana Hüfner	Germany	46.322	3	46.339	6	46.392	2	46.660	5	3:05.713	+0.481
5	7	Kimberley McRae	Canada	46.339	4	46.449	8	46.480	4	46.610	4	3:05.878	+0.646
6	1	Erin Hamlin	United States	46.357	6	46.333	5	46.506	5	46.716	8	3:05.912	+0.680
7	22	Raluca Strămăturaru	Romania	46.469	8	46.532	12	46.606	9	46.681	6	3:06.288	+1.056
8	20	Aileen Frisch	South Korea	46.350	5	46.456	9	46.751	13	46.843	11	3:06.400	+1.168
9	15	Madeleine Egle	Austria	46.726	14	46.646	14	46.541	6	46.696	7	3:06.609	+1.377
10	8	Andrea Vötter	Italy	46.577	10	46.483	11	46.907	15	46.892	13	3:06.859	+1.627
11	10	Martina Kocher	Switzerland	46.837	17	46.657	15	46.638	11	46.761	10	3:06.893	+1.661
12	16	Ulla Zirne	Latvia	46.471	9	46.409	7	47.327	22	46.895	14	3:07.102	+1.870
13	21	Brooke Apshkrum	Canada	46.834	16	46.839	18	46.905	14	46.983	15	3:07.561	+2.329
14	3	Sandra Robatscher	Italy	46.620	12	47.116	24	47.083	17	46.746	9	3:07.565	+2.333
15	13	Ekaterina Baturina	Olympic Athletes from Russia	47.122	21	46.700	16	46.675	12	47.122	17	3:07.619	+2.387
16	12	Elīza Cauce	Latvia	47.458	25	46.477	10	46.624	10	47.092	16	3:07.651	+2.419
17	17	Hannah Prock	Austria	46.622	13	46.585	13	47.743	25	46.854	12	3:07.804	+2.572
18	24	Sung Eun-ryung	South Korea	46.918	18	46.851	20	47.205	18	47.276	18	3:08.250	+3.018
19	4	Summer Britcher	United States	46.829	15	46.132	1	46.603	8	48.770	19	3:08.334	+3.102
20	14	Ewa Kuls-Kusyk	Poland	47.037	20	46.933	22	47.212	19	Did not advance		2:21.182	N/A
21	30	Olena Shkhumova	Ukraine	46.950	19	46.844	19	47.751	26	Did not advance		2:21.545	N/A
22	9	Kendija Aparjode	Latvia	48.103	27	46.927	21	47.296	21	Did not advance		2:22.326	N/A
23	27	Katarina Šimoňáková	Slovakia	47.428	24	47.606	25	47.538	23	Did not advance		2:22.572	N/A
24	25	Verónica María Ravenna	Argentina	47.175	22	47.788	26	47.739	24	Did not advance		2:22.702	N/A
25	19	Natalia Wojtuściszyn	Poland	49.133	29	46.736	17	47.290	20	Did not advance		2:23.159	N/A
26	29	Tereza Nosková	Czech Republic	47.813	26	48.132	27	47.921	27	Did not advance		2:23.866	N/A
27	26	Daria Obratov	Croatia	48.615	28	48.252	28	48.686	29	Did not advance		2:25.553	N/A
28	28	Olena Stetskiv	Ukraine	50.599	30	48.303	29	47.929	28	Did not advance		2:26.831	N/A
	23	Emily Sweeney	United States	46.595	11	46.960	23	46.917	16	DNF		DNF	
	18	Birgit Platzer	Austria	47.318	23	DNF						DNF	
