= 2016 FIL World Luge Championships – Team relay =

Team relay at the 2016 FIL World Luge Championships
- Venue: Königssee bobsleigh, luge, and skeleton track, Königssee
- Date: 31 January
- Competitors: 42 from 13 nations
- Teams: 13
- Winning time: 2:44.062

Medalists
gold medal	Natalie Geisenberger; Felix Loch; Tobias Wendl; Tobias Arlt	Germany
silver medal	Elīza Tīruma; Inārs Kivlenieks; Andris Šics; Juris Šics	Latvia
bronze medal	Alex Gough; Mitchel Malyk; Tristan Walker; Justin Snith	Canada

2016 FIL World Luge Championships
Singles	men		women
Doubles	doubles
Sprint	men	doubles	women
Relay		mixed

The Team relay race of the 2016 FIL World Luge Championships was held on 31 January 2016.

== Results ==
The race was started at 14:03.

Rank	Bib	Country	Athletes	Women	Men	Doubles	Total	Diff
1st place, gold medalist(s)	13	Germany	Natalie Geisenberger; Felix Loch; Tobias Wendl/Tobias Arlt	53.626	54.965	55.471	2:44.062	
2nd place, silver medalist(s)	11	Latvia	Elīza Cauce; Inārs Kivlenieks; Andris Šics/Juris Šics	53.754	55.914	55.946	2:45.614	+1.552
3rd place, bronze medalist(s)	8	Canada	Alex Gough; Mitchel Malyk; Tristan Walker/Justin Snith	54.105	55.882	55.920	2:45.907	+1.845
4	12	Russia	Tatiana Ivanova; Semen Pavlichenko; Andrey Bogdanov/Andrey Medvedev	53.995	56.030	56.080	2:46.105	+2.043
5	10	United States	Erin Hamlin; Chris Mazdzer; Matthew Mortensen/Jayson Terdiman	54.000	55.739	56.406	2:46.145	+2.083
6	7	Austria	Birgit Platzer; Wolfgang Kindl; Peter Penz/Georg Fischler	54.489	55.822	55.856	2:46.167	+2.105
7	9	Italy	Sandra Robatscher; Dominik Fischnaller; Christian Oberstolz/Patrick Gruber	54.806	55.905	56.366	2:47.077	+3.015
8	6	Poland	Ewa Kuls; Maciej Kurowski; Wojciech Chmielewski/Jakub Kowalewski	55.146	56.259	57.515	2:48.920	+4.858
9	5	Romania	Raluca Strămăturaru; Valentin Creţu; Cosmin Atodiresei/Ștefan Musei	55.119	56.209	58.250	2:49.578	+5.516
10	2	South Korea	Sung Eun-ryung; Kim Dong-hyeon; Park Jin-yong/Cho Jung-myung	55.517	57.541	57.485	2:50.543	+6.481
11	4	Czech Republic	Tereza Nosková; Ondřej Hyman; Matěj Kvíčala/Jaromír Kudera	56.044	56.786	57.779	2:50.609	+6.547
12	3	Slovakia	Viera Gburova; Jozef Ninis; Jakub Šimoňák/Marek Solčanský	55.300	56.431	59.289	2:51.020	+6.958
13	1	Ukraine	Olena Stetskiv; Anton Dukach; Oleksandr Obolonchyk/Roman Zakharkiv	57.214	57.837	58.827	2:53.878	+9.816
