= Luge at the 2014 Winter Olympics – Team relay =

Team relay at the XXII Olympic Winter Games
- Pictogram for luge
- Venue: Sliding Center Sanki
- Dates: 13 February 2014
- Competitors: 48 from 12 nations
- Winning time: 2:45.649

Medalists
1st place, gold medalist(s)		Natalie Geisenberger; Felix Loch; Tobias Wendl/Tobias Arlt	Germany
2nd place, silver medalist(s)		Tatiana Ivanova; Albert Demchenko; Alexander Denisyev / Vladislav Antonov	Russia
3rd place, bronze medalist(s)		Elīza Tīruma; Mārtiņš Rubenis; Andris Šics/Juris Šics	Latvia

The team relay luge at the 2014 Winter Olympics was held on 13 February 2014 at the Sliding Center Sanki in Rzhanaya Polyana, Russia. This was the inaugural event of the team relay at the Olympics. The competition was won by Germany. Russia and Latvia won silver and bronze, respectively.

On December 22, 2017 Albert Demchenko and Tatiana Ivanova of Russia were banned for doping violations. Results of the Russian team were voided. They successfully appealed against the lifetime ban as well as annulment of result at the court of arbitration for sport, and on 1 February 2018 the results were restored.

== Qualified teams ==
- Austria
- Canada
- Czech Republic
- Germany
- Italy
- Latvia
- Poland
- Russia
- Slovakia
- South Korea
- Ukraine
- United States

== Results ==
The event started at 20:15.

Rank	Bib	Athletes	Country	Women's singles	Men's singles	Men's doubles	Total	Behind
1st place, gold medalist(s)	10–1; 10–2; 10–3	Natalie Geisenberger; Felix Loch; Tobias Wendl / Tobias Arlt	Germany	54.095	55.639	55.915	2:45.649	—
2nd place, silver medalist(s)	7–1; 7–2; 7–3	Tatiana Ivanova; Albert Demchenko; Alexander Denisyev / Vladislav Antonov	Russia	54.429	55.775	56.475	2:46.679	+1.030
3rd place, bronze medalist(s)	6–1; 6–2; 6–3	Elīza Tīruma; Mārtiņš Rubenis; Andris Šics / Juris Šics	Latvia	54.745	56.048	56.502	2:47.295	+1.646
4	11–1; 11–2; 11–3	Alex Gough; Samuel Edney; Tristan Walker / Justin Snith	Canada	54.643	56.197	56.555	2:47.395	+1.746
5	9–1; 9–2; 9–3	Sandra Gasparini; Armin Zöggeler; Christian Oberstolz / Patrick Gruber	Italy	54.823	56.039	56.558	2:47.420	+1.771
6	8–1; 8–2; 8–3	Erin Hamlin; Chris Mazdzer; Christian Niccum / Jayson Terdiman	United States	54.338	56.245	56.972	2:47.555	+1.906
7	12–1; 12–2; 12–3	Miriam Kastlunger; Wolfgang Kindl; Andreas Linger / Wolfgang Linger	Austria	55.596	56.434	56.447	2:48.477	+2.828
8	3–1; 3–2; 3–3	Natalia Wojtuściszyn; Maciej Kurowski; Patryk Poręba / Karol Mikrut	Poland	54.937	56.737	58.079	2:49.753	+4.104
9	4–1; 4–2; 4–3	Vendula Kotenová; Ondřej Hyman; Lukáš Brož / Antonín Brož	Czech Republic	55.600	56.926	57.279	2:49.805	+4.156
10	5–1; 5–2; 5–3	Viera Gburová; Jozef Ninis; Marian Zemaník / Jozef Petrulák	Slovakia	55.757	56.472	57.936	2:50.165	+4.516
11	2–1; 2–2; 2–3	Olena Shkhumova; Andriy Kis; Oleksandr Obolonchyk / Roman Zakharkiv	Ukraine	55.671	56.882	58.502	2:51.055	+5.406
12	1–1; 1–2; 1–3	Sung Eun-ryung; Kim Dong-hyeon; Park Jin-yong / Cho Jung-myung	South Korea	56.174	57.986	58.469	2:52.629	+6.980
