= Luge at the 2014 Winter Olympics – Women's singles =

Women's singles at the XXII Olympic Winter Games
- Pictogram for luge
- Venue: Sliding Center Sanki
- Dates: 10–11 February 2014
- Competitors: 31 from 16 nations
- Winning time: 3:19.768

Medalists
1st place, gold medalist(s)		Natalie Geisenberger	Germany
2nd place, silver medalist(s)		Tatjana Hüfner	Germany
3rd place, bronze medalist(s)		Erin Hamlin	United States

The women's luge at the 2014 Winter Olympics was held on 10–11 February 2014 at the Sliding Center Sanki in Rzhanaya Polyana, Russia.

== Qualifying athletes ==
The top 28, with each nation allowed a maximum of 3, after five of five races. Czech Republic and South Korea receive the team relay allocations to complete a team. Since the men's singles competition did not use its last quota, a spot also goes to Kazakhstan (the next best ranked nation without representation).

- Miriam Kastlunger (AUT)
- Birgit Platzer (AUT)
- Nina Reithmayer (AUT)
- Alex Gough (CAN)
- Arianne Jones (CAN)
- Kimberley McRae (CAN)
- Vendula Kotenová (CZE)
- Morgane Bonnefoy (FRA)
- Natalie Geisenberger (GER)
- Tatjana Hüfner (GER)
- Anke Wischnewski (GER)
- Sandra Gasparini (ITA)
- Sandra Robatscher (ITA)
- Andrea Vötter (ITA)
- Elizaveta Axenova (KAZ)
- Sung Eun-ryung (KOR)
- Elīza Tīruma (LAT)
- Ulla Zirne (LAT)
- Ewa Kuls (POL)
- Natalia Wojtusciszyn (POL)
- Raluca Strămăturaru (ROM)
- Ekaterina Baturina (RUS)
- Tatiana Ivanova (RUS)
- Natalia Khoreva (RUS)
- Martina Kocher (SUI)
- Viera Gburova (SVK)
- Olena Shkhumova (UKR)
- Olena Stetskiv (UKR)
- Summer Britcher (USA)
- Erin Hamlin (USA)
- Kate Hansen (USA)

== Competition schedule ==
All times are (UTC+4).

Date	Time	Event
10 February	18:45	Run 1
10 February	20:20	Run 2
11 February	18:30	Run 3
11 February	20:10	Run 4

== Results ==
The four runs were split over two days.

Rank	Bib	Athlete	Country	Run 1	Rank	Run 2	Rank	Run 3	Rank	Run 4	Rank	Total	Behind
1st place, gold medalist(s)	2	Natalie Geisenberger	Germany	49.891	1	49.923	1	49.765	1	50.189	1	3:19.768	—
2nd place, silver medalist(s)	9	Tatjana Hüfner	Germany	50.393	3	50.187	2	50.048	2	50.279	2	3:20.907	+1.139
3rd place, bronze medalist(s)	11	Erin Hamlin	United States	50.356	2	50.276	3	50.165	3	50.348	3	3:21.145	+1.377
4	10	Alex Gough	Canada	50.464	5	50.402	5	50.286	4	50.426	5	3:21.578	+1.810
5	12	Kimberley McRae	Canada	50.465	6	50.454	6	50.356	5	50.620	11	3:21.895	+2.127
6	7	Anke Wischnewski	Germany	50.490	7	50.476	9	50.462	7	50.532	7	3:21.960	+2.192
7	4	Tatiana Ivanova	Russia	50.457	4	50.492	10	50.450	6	50.607	9	3:22.006	+2.238
8	8	Natalia Khoreva	Russia	50.500	8	50.348	4	50.599	9	50.620	11	3:22.067	+2.299
9	5	Martina Kocher	Switzerland	50.560	9	50.454	6	50.593	8	50.559	8	3:22.166	+2.398
10	3	Kate Hansen	United States	50.794	10	50.581	11	50.793	13	50.499	6	3:22.667	+2.889
11	1	Ekaterina Baturina	Russia	51.263	21	50.457	8	50.629	10	50.382	4	3:22.731	+2.963
12	21	Elīza Tīruma	Latvia	50.926	11	50.651	12	50.758	12	50.736	13	3:23.071	+3.303
13	22	Arianne Jones	Canada	50.993	13	50.837	15	50.745	11	50.608	10	3:23.183	+3.415
14	6	Sandra Gasparini	Italy	51.032	14	50.803	14	50.959	14	50.962	15	3:23.756	+3.988
15	25	Summer Britcher	United States	51.222	19	50.930	16	51.082	16	50.909	14	3:24.143	+4.375
16	19	Natalia Wojtusciszyn	Poland	51.138	16	51.168	22	51.141	19	51.199	18	3:24.646	+4.878
17	18	Miriam Kastlunger	Austria	51.622	24	50.795	13	51.139	18	51.109	16	3:24.665	+4.897
18	20	Ulla Zirne	Latvia	51.125	15	51.159	21	51.054	15	51.347	21	3:24.685	+4.917
19	17	Andrea Vötter	Italy	50.937	12	51.592	27	51.420	20	51.290	20	3:25.239	+5.291
20	13	Nina Reithmayer	Austria	51.225	20	51.143	20	51.614	22	51.174	17	3:25.156	+5.388
21	23	Ewa Kuls	Poland	51.362	22	51.031	18	51.424	21	51.550	22	3:25.367	+5.599
22	14	Sandra Robatscher	Italy	51.589	23	50.981	17	51.678	23	51.258	19	3:25.506	+5.738
23	24	Birgit Platzer	Austria	51.201	17	51.518	25	51.760	24	52.097	28	3:26.576	+6.808
24	26	Vendula Kotenová	Czech Republic	51.760	25	51.492	24	51.856	26	51.567	24	3:26.675	+6.907
25	16	Viera Gburova	Slovakia	51.928	27	51.422	23	51.782	25	51.565	23	3:26.697	+6.929
26	30	Olena Stetskiv	Ukraine	52.064	28	51.553	26	51.991	28	51.889	26	3:27.497	+7.729
27	31	Morgane Bonnefoy	France	51.820	26	51.641	28	51.948	27	52.183	30	3:27.592	+7.824
28	28	Elizaveta Axenova	Kazakhstan	52.068	29	51.836	30	52.340	30	51.841	25	3:28.085	+8.317
29	27	Sung Eun-ryung	South Korea	52.173	30	51.960	31	52.486	31	52.124	29	3:28.743	+8.975
30	29	Raluca Strămăturaru	Romania	52.862	31	51.821	29	52.238	29	52.083	27	3:29.004	+9.236
31	15	Olena Shkhumova	Ukraine	51.211	18	51.092	19	51.128	17	1:01:416	31	3:34.847	+15.079
