= 2016 FIL World Luge Championships – Doubles' sprint =

Doubles' sprint at the 2016 FIL World Luge Championships
- Venue: Königssee bobsleigh, luge, and skeleton track, Königssee
- Date: 29 January
- Competitors: 54 from 14 nations
- Teams: 27
- Winning time: 39.032

Medalists
gold medal	Tobias Wendl; Tobias Arlt	Germany
silver medal	Peter Penz; Georg Fischler	Austria
bronze medal	Christian Oberstolz; Patrick Gruber	Italy

2016 FIL World Luge Championships
Singles	men		women
Doubles	doubles
Sprint	men	doubles	women
Relay		mixed

The Doubles' sprint race of the 2016 FIL World Luge Championships was held on 29 January 2016.

== Results ==
The qualification run was started at 09:00 and the final run at 14:48.

Rank	Bib	Name	Country	Qualification	Rank	Final	Rank	Diff
1st place, gold medalist(s)	15	Tobias Wendl; Tobias Arlt	Germany	39.017	1	39.032	1	
2nd place, silver medalist(s)	13	Peter Penz; Georg Fischler	Austria	39.596	10	39.261	2	+0.229
3rd place, bronze medalist(s)	12	Christian Oberstolz; Patrick Gruber	Italy	39.491	5	39.428	3	+0.396
4	10	Andris Šics; Juris Šics	Latvia	39.505	6	39.452	4	+0.420
5	11	Matthew Mortensen; Jayson Terdiman	United States	39.480	4	39.573	5	+0.541
6	3	Thomas Steu; Lorenz Koller	Austria	39.567	8	39.593	6	+0.561
7	7	Tristan Walker; Justin Snith	Canada	39.577	9	39.600	7	+0.568
8	6	Andrey Bogdanov; Andrey Medvedev	Russia	39.517	7	39.653	8	+0.621
9	4	Robin Geueke; David Gamm	Germany	39.360	3	39.669	9	+0.637
10	5	Alexandr Denisyev; Vladislav Antonov	Russia	39.742	11	39.712	10	+0.680
11	2	Justin Krewson; Andrew Sherk	United States	39.805	13	39.791	11	+0.759
12	9	Ludwig Rieder; Patrick Rastner	Italy	39.921	14	39.908	12	+0.876
13	17	Vladislav Yuzhakov; Jury Prokhorov	Russia	39.803	12	40.167	13	+1.135
14	16	Lukáš Brož; Antonín Brož	Czech Republic	39.992	15	40.332	14	+1.300
16	21	Wojciech Chmielewski; Jakub Kowalewski	Poland	40.004	16			
17	20	Kristens Putins; Karlis Matuzels	Latvia	40.019	17			
18	23	Florian Gruber; Simon Kainzwalder	Italy	40.049	18			
19	25	Patryk Poręba; Karol Mikrut	Poland	40.367	19			
20	18	Jakub Šimoňák; Marek Solčanský	Slovakia	40.585	20			
21	22	Oleksandr Obolonchyk; Roman Zakharkiv	Ukraine	40.786	21			
22	26	Daniel Popa; Ionuț Țăran	Romania	40.807	22			
23	27	Adam Rosen; Raymond Thompson	Great Britain	41.936	23			
24	8	Oskars Gudramovičs; Pēteris Kalniņs	Latvia	45.968	24			
	1	Matěj Kvíčala; Jaromír Kudera	Czech Republic		DNF			
	19	Cosmin Atodiresei; Ștefan Musei	Romania		DNF			
	14	Toni Eggert; Sascha Benecken	Germany	39.073	2		DSQ	
	24	Park Jin-yong; Cho Jung-myung	South Korea		DSQ			
