= 2016 FIL World Luge Championships – Doubles =

Doubles at the 2016 FIL World Luge Championships
- Venue: Königssee bobsleigh, luge, and skeleton track, Königssee
- Date: 30 January
- Competitors: 54 from 14 nations
- Winning time: 1:38.975

Medalists
gold medal	Tobias Wendl; Tobias Arlt	Germany
silver medal	Toni Eggert; Sascha Benecken	Germany
bronze medal	Christian Oberstolz; Patrick Gruber	Italy

2016 FIL World Luge Championships
Singles	men		women
Doubles	doubles
Sprint	men	doubles	women
Relay		mixed

The Doubles race of the 2016 FIL World Luge Championships was held on 30 January 2016.

== Results ==
The first run will be started at 12:48 and the final run at 14:02.

Rank	Bib	Name	Country	Run 1	Rank	Run 2	Rank	Total	Diff
1st place, gold medalist(s)	2	Tobias Wendl; Tobias Arlt	Germany	49.311	1	49.664	1	1:38.975	
2nd place, silver medalist(s)	7	Toni Eggert; Sascha Benecken	Germany	49.808	2	49.778	2	1:39.586	+0.611
3rd place, bronze medalist(s)	9	Christian Oberstolz; Patrick Gruber	Italy	50.357	6	50.371	3	1:40.728	+1.753
4	3	Robin Geueke; David Gamm	Germany	50.270	4	50.502	6	1:40.772	+1.797
5	6	Andris Šics; Juris Šics	Latvia	50.314	5	50.464	5	1:40.778	+1.803
6	4	Andrey Bogdanov; Andrey Medvedev	Russia	50.470	8	50.412	4	1:40.882	+1.907
7	1	Ludwig Rieder; Patrick Rastner	Italy	50.530	9	50.524	7	1:41.054	+2.079
8	8	Tristan Walker; Justin Snith	Canada	50.265	3	50.890	9	1:41.155	+2.180
9	5	Matthew Mortensen; Jayson Terdiman	United States	50.622	10	50.558	8	1:41.180	+2.205
10	12	Oskars Gudramovičs; Pēteris Kalniņs	Latvia	50.387	7	51.436	15	1:41.823	+2.848
11	18	Wojciech Chmielewski; Jakub Kowalewski	Poland	50.915	11	50.968	10	1:41.883	+2.908
12	15	Vladislav Yuzhakov; Jury Prokhorov	Russia	51.155	12	51.091	11	1:42.246	+3.271
13	17	Florian Gruber; Simon Kainzwalder	Italy	51.239	13	51.111	12	1:42.350	+3.375
14	16	Lukáš Brož; Antonín Brož	Czech Republic	51.389	14	51.420	14	1:42.809	+3.834
15	21	Park Jin-yong; Cho Jung-myung	South Korea	51.683	15	51.472	16	1:43.155	+4.180
16	23	Matěj Kvíčala; Jaromír Kudera	Czech Republic	52.095	17	51.350	13	1:43.445	+4.470
17	22	Cosmin Atodiresei; Ștefan Musei	Romania	51.918	16	52.229	17	1:44.147	+5.172
18	25	Daniel Popa; Ionuț Țăran	Romania	52.249	19			52.249	
19	11	Peter Penz; Georg Fischler	Austria	52.269	20			52.269	
20	27	Adam Rosen; Raymond Thompson	Great Britain	52.318	21			52.318	
21	20	Patryk Poręba; Karol Mikrut	Poland	52.693	22			52.693	
22	24	Jakub Šimoňák; Marek Solčanský	Slovakia	52.836	23			52.836	
23	10	Alexandr Denisyev; Vladislav Antonov	Russia	52.928	24			52.928	
24	26	Kristens Putins; Karlis Matuzels	Latvia	53.043	25			53.043	
	19	Oleksandr Obolonchyk; Roman Zakharkiv	Ukraine	52.239	18	DNF			
	13	Thomas Steu; Lorenz Koller	Austria	DNF					
	14	Justin Krewson; Andrew Sherk	United States	DNF					
