= 2016 FIL World Luge Championships – Men's singles =

Men's singles at the 2016 FIL World Luge Championships
- Venue: Königssee bobsleigh, luge, and skeleton track, Königssee
- Date: 31 January
- Competitors: 42 from 18 nations
- Winning time: 1:38.864

Medalists
| gold medal | Felix Loch | Germany |
| silver medal | Ralf Palik | Germany |
| bronze medal | Wolfgang Kindl | Austria |

2016 FIL World Luge Championships
| Singles | men | | women |
| Doubles | doubles |
| Sprint | men | doubles | women |
| Relay | | mixed |

The Men's singles race of the 2016 FIL World Luge Championships was held on 31 January 2016.

== Results ==
The first run started at 10:19 and the final run at 12:27.

| Rank | Bib | Name | Country | Run 1 | Rank | Run 2 | Rank | Total | Diff |
|---|---|---|---|---|---|---|---|---|---|
| 1st place, gold medalist(s) | 2 | Felix Loch | Germany | 49.173 | 1 | 49.691 | 1 | 1:38.864 | |
| 2nd place, silver medalist(s) | 3 | Ralf Palik | Germany | 49.406 | 2 | 49.881 | 2 | 1:39.287 | +0.423 |
| 3rd place, bronze medalist(s) | 4 | Wolfgang Kindl | Austria | 49.460 | 3 | 50.093 | 3 | 1:39.553 | +0.689 |
| 4 | 5 | Chris Mazdzer | United States | 49.490 | 4 | 50.243 | 4 | 1:39.733 | +0.869 |
| 5 | 6 | Andi Langenhan | Germany | 49.490 | 4 | 50.379 | 6 | 1:39.869 | +1.005 |
| 6 | 1 | Tucker West | United States | 49.692 | 7 | 50.489 | 10 | 1:40.181 | +1.317 |
| 7 | 7 | David Gleirscher | Austria | 49.869 | 10 | 50.355 | 5 | 1:40.224 | +1.360 |
| 8 | 9 | Semen Pavlichenko | Russia | 49.802 | 8 | 50.427 | 9 | 1:40.229 | +1.365 |
| 9 | 11 | Armin Frauscher | Austria | 49.672 | 6 | 50.596 | 11 | 1:40.268 | +1.404 |
| 10 | 14 | Riks Rozītis | Latvia | 49.900 | 12 | 50.382 | 7 | 1:40.282 | +1.418 |
| 11 | 8 | Johannes Ludwig | Germany | 49.879 | 11 | 50.420 | 8 | 1:40.299 | +1.435 |
| 12 | 12 | Mitchel Malyk | Canada | 49.822 | 9 | 50.707 | 13 | 1:40.529 | +1.665 |
| 13 | 10 | Roman Repilov | Russia | 49.935 | 13 | 50.776 | 17 | 1:40.711 | +1.847 |
| 14 | 18 | Kevin Fischnaller | Italy | 50.157 | 14 | 50.771 | 16 | 1:40.928 | +2.064 |
| 15 | 15 | Dominik Fischnaller | Italy | 50.236 | 15 | 50.712 | 14 | 1:40.948 | +2.084 |
| 16 | 16 | Stepan Fedorov | Russia | 50.394 | 17 | 50.671 | 12 | 1:41.065 | +2.201 |
| 17 | 17 | Reinhard Egger | Austria | 50.239 | 16 | 50.934 | 19 | 1:41.173 | +2.309 |
| 18 | 19 | Valentin Creţu | Romania | 50.432 | 18 | 50.745 | 15 | 1:41.177 | +2.313 |
| 19 | 20 | Jozef Ninis | Slovakia | 50.653 | 20 | 50.892 | 18 | 1:41.545 | +2.681 |
| 20 | 21 | Maciej Kurowski | Poland | 50.524 | 19 | 51.107 | 20 | 1:41.631 | +2.767 |
| 21 | 29 | Wojciech Chmielewski | Poland | 51.033 | 24 | 51.275 | 21 | 1:42.308 | +3.444 |
| 22 | 32 | Emanuel Rieder | Italy | 50.958 | 22 | 51.371 | 22 | 1:42.329 | +3.465 |
| 23 | 31 | Taylor Morris | United States | 50.987 | 23 | 51.575 | 23 | 1:42.562 | +3.698 |
| 24 | 27 | Maksim Aravin | Russia | 51.117 | 25 | 51.993 | 24 | 1:43.110 | +4.246 |
| 25 | 37 | Kristaps Mauriņš | Latvia | 51.171 | 26 | | | 51.171 | |
| 26 | 23 | Ondřej Hyman | Czech Republic | 51.186 | 27 | | | 51.186 | |
| 27 | 38 | Andriy Mandziy | Ukraine | 51.195 | 28 | | | 51.195 | |
| 28 | 24 | Aidan Kelly | United States | 51.310 | 29 | | | 51.310 | |
| 29 | 28 | Reid Watts | Canada | 51.404 | 30 | | | 51.404 | |
| 30 | 25 | Anton Dukach | Ukraine | 51.455 | 31 | | | 51.455 | |
| 31 | 34 | Alexander Ferlazzo | Australia | 51.585 | 32 | | | 51.585 | |
| 32 | 30 | Hidenari Kanayama | Japan | 51.812 | 33 | | | 51.812 | |
| 33 | 35 | Rupert Staudinger | Great Britain | 52.134 | 34 | | | 52.134 | |
| 34 | 36 | Pavel Angelov | Bulgaria | 52.260 | 35 | | | 52.260 | |
| 35 | 26 | Theo Gruber | Italy | 52.317 | 36 | | | 52.317 | |
| 36 | 39 | Tilen Sirse | Slovenia | 52.444 | 37 | | | 52.444 | |
| 37 | 41 | Lim Nam-kyu | South Korea | 52.659 | 38 | | | 52.659 | |
| 38 | 33 | Kim Dong-hyeon | South Korea | 52.795 | 39 | | | 52.795 | |
| 39 | 40 | Daniel Popa | Romania | 53.041 | 40 | | | 53.041 | |
| 40 | 42 | Kang Doung-kyu | South Korea | 54.607 | 41 | | | 54.607 | |
| | 22 | Artūrs Dārznieks | Latvia | 50.830 | 21 | DNF | | | |
| | 13 | Inārs Kivlenieks | Latvia | DNF | | | | | |
