= Olena Shkhumova =

Ukrainian luger (born 1993)

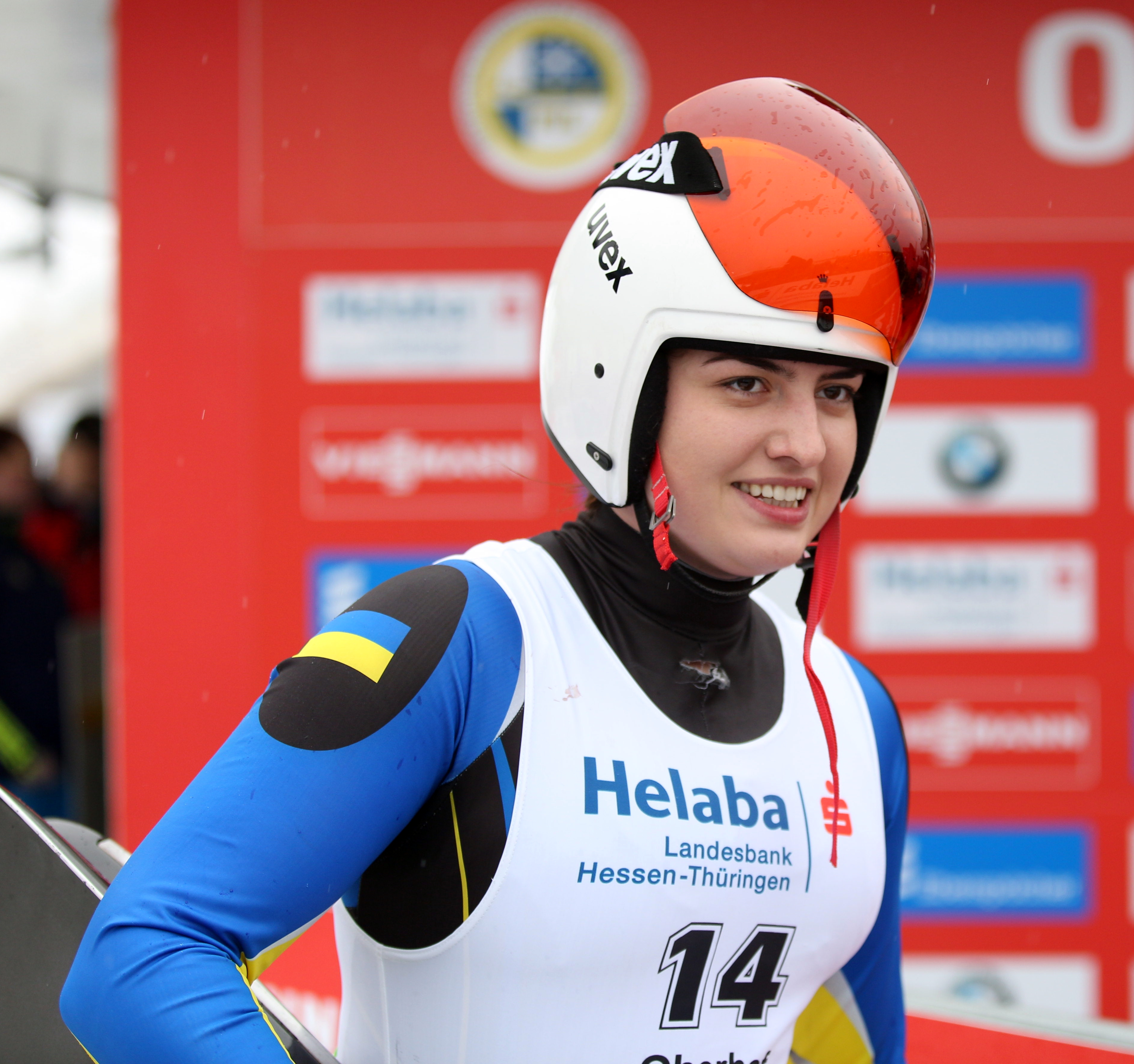
- Shkhumova in 2017

Personal information
- Native name: Олена Замирівна Шхумова
- Full name: Olena Zamyrivna Shkhumova
- Nationality: Ukrainian
- Born: 24 November 1993 (age 32) Lviv, Ukraine
- Height: 1.78 m (5 ft 10 in)
- Weight: 87 kg (192 lb)

Sport
- Country: Ukraine
- Sport: Luge
- Event: Women's singles

Olena Zamyrivna Shkhumova (Ukrainian: Олена Замирівна Шхумова, born 24 November 1993 in Lviv) is a Ukrainian luger. She participated at 2014 and 2018 Winter Olympics.

== Career ==
Shkhumova's first World Cup season was in 2011–12. She wasn't leader of the national team but she succeeded to qualify for 2014 Winter Olympics along with Olena Stetskiv. In the women's singles she placed last - 31st. She was also a part of the Ukrainian relay team, which finished 11th.

In 2016–17 season she improved her performances and became leader of Ukrainian team. At 2017 World Championships she was 22nd. As of January 2018, Shkhumova's best Luge World Cup finish was 20th in 2016–17 in Park City, United States.

On December 27, 2017, Olena Shkhumova qualified for 2018 Winter Olympics. She was 21st in singles race and 13th in team relay.

== Personal life ==
Olena graduated from Lviv State University of Physical Culture.

== Career results ==
=== Winter Olympics ===
Year	Event	Singles	Relay
2014	Sochi, Russia	31	11
2018	Pyeongchang, South Korea	21	13

=== World Championships ===
Year	Event	Singles	Relay	Singles Sprint
2015	Sigulda, Latvia	37		
2016	Königssee, Germany	35		36
2017	Innsbruck, Austria	22	13	

=== European Championships ===
Year	Event	Singles	Relay
2014	Sigulda, Latvia		7
2016	Altenberg, Germany	24	

=== Luge World Cup ===
==== Rankings ====
Season	Singles	Doubles Sprint
2011–12	34	
2012–13	50	
2013–14	31	
2014–15	38	
2015–16	29	
2016–17	24	18
2017–18	35	
