= Vendula Kotenová =

Czech luger (born 1994)

Personal information
- Nationality: Czech
- Born: 6 November 1994 (age 31) Jablonec nad Nisou, Czech Republic
- Height: 1.68 m (5 ft 6 in)
- Weight: 65 kg (143 lb)

Sport
- Country: Czech Republic
- Sport: Luge
- Event: Women's singles

Vendula Kotenová (born 6 November 1994) is a Czech luger.

Kotenová competed at the 2014 Winter Olympics for the Czech Republic. In the Women's singles she placed 24th. She was also a part of the Czech relay team, which finished 9th.

As of September 2014, Kotenová's best Luge World Cup overall finish is 35th in 2013–14.
