= Olena Stetskiv =

Ukrainian luger (born 1994)

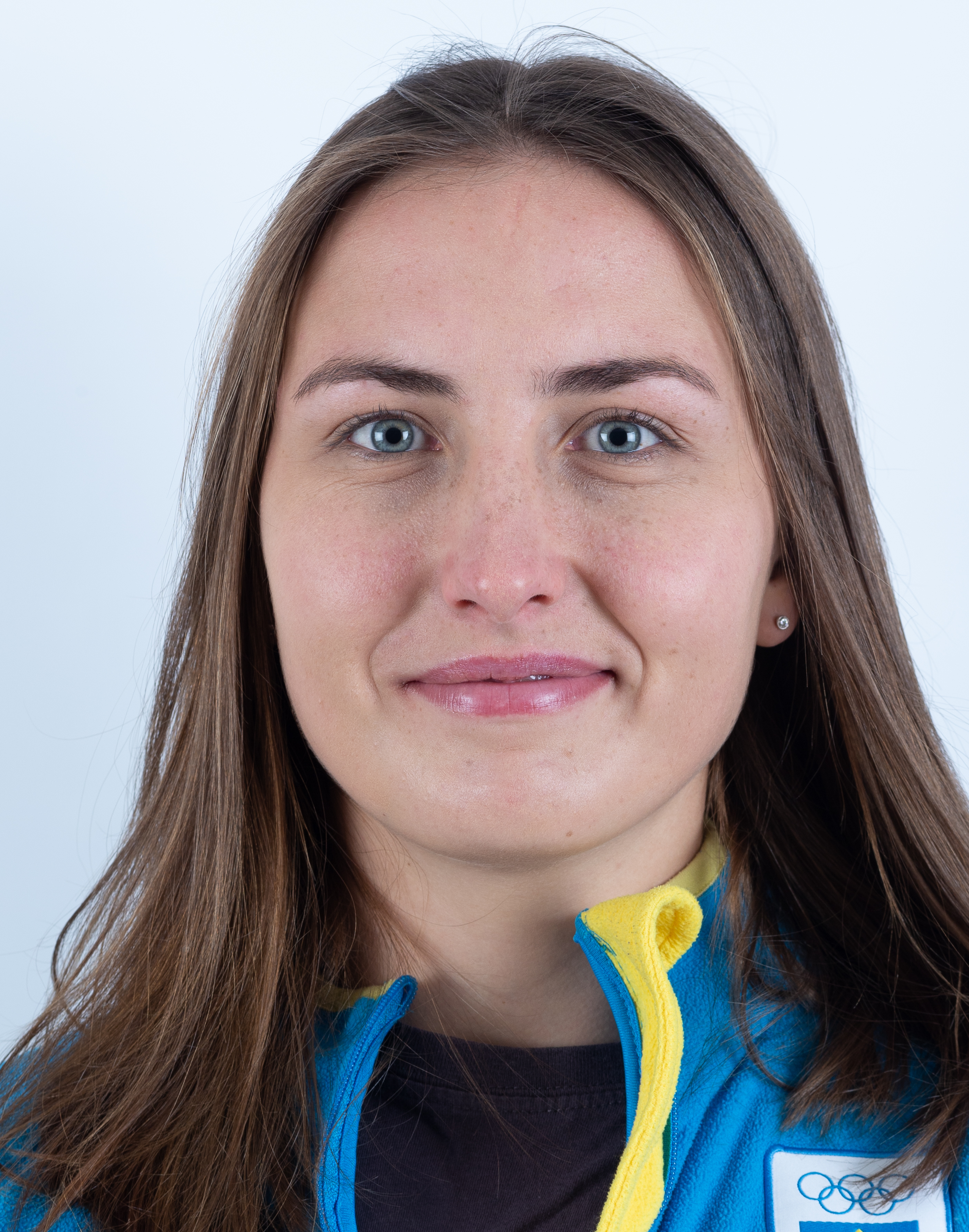
- Stetskiv in 2018

Personal information
- Nationality: Ukrainian
- Born: 15 June 1994 (age 31) Lviv, Ukraine
- Height: 1.73 m (5 ft 8 in)
- Weight: 75 kg (165 lb)

Sport
- Country: Ukraine
- Sport: Luge
- Event(s): Women's singles, women's doubles

Olena Andriivna Stetskiv (Ukrainian: Олена Андріївна Стецків, born 15 June 1994) is a Ukrainian luger. She participated at the 2014, 2018, 2022, and 2026 Winter Olympics.

== Career ==
Stetskiv competed at the 2012 Winter Youth Olympics in Innsbruck, Austria, where she was 9th in the singles competition and 7th in the team relay (together with Dukach, Buryy, and Lehedza). Next season she debuted in World Cup competitions.

As of December 2025, Stetskiv's best Luge World Cup singles finish was 12th during the 2018–19 in Altenberg, Germany.

Stetskiv competed in both singles and doubles together with Oleksandra Mokh for three seasons between 2023 and 2025. Since the beginning of the 2025–26 season, she competes in doubles only. As of December 2025, her best doubles finishes include the 6th rank in the sprint event in Sigulda in the season 2023–24 and the 7th rank in three races (Sigulda 2022–23, Sigulda 2023–24, and Sigulda 2024–25).

On January 5, 2025, Stetskiv finished third in the mixed relay event in Sigulda. The team also included Mandziy, Tunytska, Hoy, Kachmar, and Mokh. This marked the first ever medal for Ukraine in the relay event.

Stetskiv competed at the 2014 Winter Olympics for Ukraine. In the women's singles, she placed 26th.

She represented Ukraine at the 2018 Winter Olympics in Pyeongchang, South Korea. She finished 28th in women's singles.

In 2022, Olena Stetskiv was nominated for her third Winter Games in Beijing. On the Xiaohaituo Bobsleigh and Luge Track, he finished 22nd after three runs and did not qualify for the last run.

== Personal life ==
Stetskiv graduated from Lviv State University of Physical Culture. Her hobbies are music and football.

== Career results ==
=== Winter Olympics ===
Year	Event	Singles	Doubles	Relay
2014	Sochi, Russia	26	—N/a	—
2018	Pyeongchang, South Korea	28	—N/a	—
2022	Beijing, China	22	—N/a	—
2026	Milan–Cortina, Italy	—	7	6

=== World Championships ===
Year	Event	Singles	Relay	Singles Sprint	Doubles	Doubles Sprint	Mixed Doubles
2015	Sigulda, Latvia	25	10	—N/a	—N/a		—N/a
2016	Königssee, Germany	33	13	34	—N/a		—N/a
2017	Innsbruck, Austria	35	—	34	—N/a		—N/a
2019	Winterberg, Germany	21	9	30	—N/a		—N/a
2021	Königssee, Germany	25	7	27	—N/a		—N/a
2023	Oberhof, Germany	29	—	24	11	13	—N/a
2024	Altenberg, Germany	—	8	—	15	12	—N/a
2025	Whistler, Canada	—	6	—N/a	11	—N/a	10

=== European Championships ===
Year	Event	Singles	Relay	Doubles	Mixed Doubles
2015	Sochi, Russia	16	5	—N/a	—N/a
2016	Altenberg, Germany	22	—	—N/a	—N/a
2017	Königssee, Germany	17	8	—N/a	—N/a
2018	Sigulda, Latvia	16	7	—N/a	—N/a
2019	Oberhof, Germany	19	7	—N/a	—N/a
2020	Lillehammer, Norway	15	8	—N/a	—N/a
2021	Sigulda, Latvia	13	6	—N/a	—N/a
2022	St. Moritz, Switzerland	19	5	—N/a	—N/a
2023	Sigulda, Latvia	15	4	6	—N/a
2024	Innsbruck, Austria	—	5	11	—N/a
2025	Winterberg, Germany	—	6	8	—N/a
2026	Oberhof, Germany	—	5	9	8

=== Luge World Cup ===
==== Relay podiums ====
Season	Track	Competition	Placement
2024–25	Sigulda, Latvia	Mixed relay	3

==== Rankings ====
Season	Singles	Singles Sprint	Singles Overall	Doubles	Doubles Sprint	Doubles Overall
2012–13	54	—N/a	—N/a	—N/a		
2013–14	32	—N/a	—N/a	—N/a		
2014–15	27	—N/a	—N/a	—N/a		
2015–16	28	—	—N/a	—N/a		
2016–17	23	—	—N/a	—N/a		
2017–18	34	—	—N/a	—N/a		
2018–19	22	—	—N/a	—N/a		
2019–20	23	—	—N/a	—N/a		
2020–21	27	—	29	—N/a		
2021–22	26	—	27	—N/a		
2022–23	33	—	35	13	13	13
2023–24	18	—	18	7	5	6
2024–25	37	—N/a		8	—N/a	
2025–26	—	—N/a		10	—N/a	
