= Elizaveta Axenova =

Russian-born Kazakhstani luger (born 1995)

Personal information
- Nationality: Kazakhstani
- Born: 11 September 1995 (age 30) Krasnoyarsk, Russia
- Height: 1.68 m (5 ft 6 in)
- Weight: 60 kg (132 lb)

Sport
- Country: Kazakhstan
- Sport: Luge
- Event: Women's singles

Elizaveta Axenova (born 11 September 1995 in Krasnoyarsk) is a Russian-born Kazakhstani luger. In 2014, she became the first luger to represent Kazakhstan in the Winter Olympics.

Axenova competed at the 2014 Winter Olympics for Kazakhstan. In the Women's singles she placed 28th.

As of September 2014, Axenova's best Luge World Cup overall finish is 24th in 2011–12.
