= Natalie Geisenberger =

German luger (born 1988)

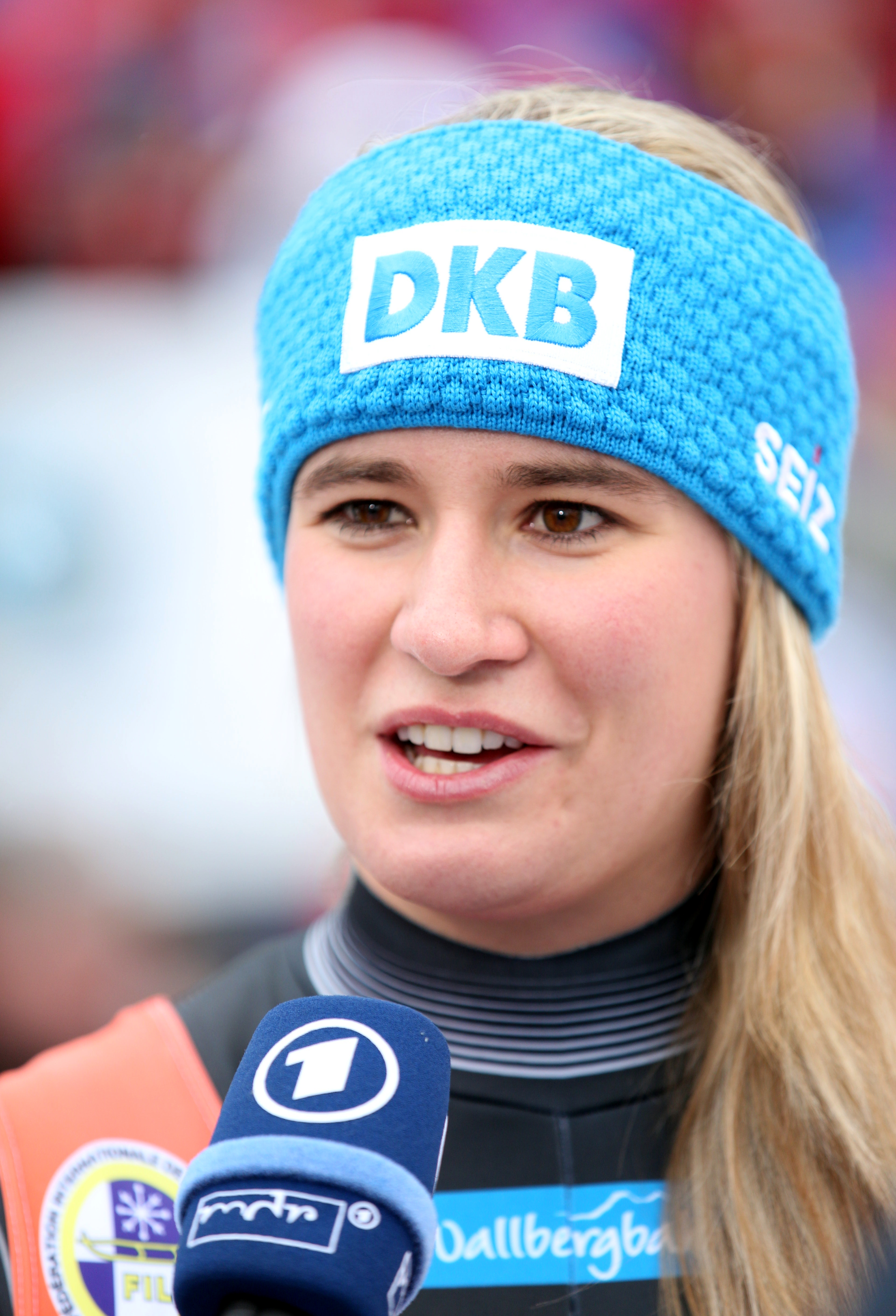
- Geisenberger in 2017

Personal information
- Nationality: German
- Born: 5 February 1988 (age 38) Munich, West Germany
- Height: 1.83 m (6 ft 0 in)
- Weight: 78 kg (172 lb)

Sport
- Country: Germany
- Sport: Luge
- Event: Singles
- Club: RRT Miesbach
- Coached by: Norbert Loch; Patric Leitner; Georg Hackl
Medal record
Representing Germany
Olympic Games
Gold medal – first place	2014 Sochi	Singles
Gold medal – first place	2014 Sochi	Team relay
Gold medal – first place	2018 Pyeongchang	Singles
Gold medal – first place	2018 Pyeongchang	Team relay
Gold medal – first place	2022 Beijing	Singles
Gold medal – first place	2022 Beijing	Team relay
Bronze medal – third place	2010 Vancouver	Singles
World Championships
Gold medal – first place	2009 Lake Placid	Team relay
Gold medal – first place	2013 Whistler	Singles
Gold medal – first place	2013 Whistler	Team relay
Gold medal – first place	2015 Sigulda	Singles
Gold medal – first place	2015 Sigulda	Team relay
Gold medal – first place	2016 Königssee	Singles
Gold medal – first place	2016 Königssee	Team relay
Gold medal – first place	2019 Winterberg	Singles
Gold medal – first place	2019 Winterberg	Sprint
Silver medal – second place	2008 Oberhof	Singles
Silver medal – second place	2009 Lake Placid	Singles
Silver medal – second place	2011 Cesana	Singles
Silver medal – second place	2016 Königssee	Sprint
Silver medal – second place	2021 Königssee	Singles
Bronze medal – third place	2012 Altenberg	Singles
Bronze medal – third place	2019 Winterberg	Team relay
European Championships
Gold medal – first place	2008 Cesana	Singles
Gold medal – first place	2013 Oberhof	Singles
Gold medal – first place	2013 Oberhof	Team relay
Gold medal – first place	2017 Königssee	Singles
Gold medal – first place	2017 Königssee	Team relay
Gold medal – first place	2019 Oberhof	Singles
Gold medal – first place	2022 St. Moritz	Singles
Silver medal – second place	2015 Sochi	Singles
Silver medal – second place	2018 Sigulda	Singles
Silver medal – second place	2018 Sigulda	Team relay
Silver medal – second place	2019 Oberhof	Team relay
Silver medal – second place	2021 Sigulda	Singles
Silver medal – second place	2022 St. Moritz	Team relay
Bronze medal – third place	2021 Sigulda	Team relay

Natalie Geisenberger (German: [ˈnataliː ˈɡaɪzn̩ˌbɛʁɡɐ]; born 5 February 1988) is a retired German luger. Widely regarded as one of the greatest lugers of all time, she is a nine-time World champion and six-time Olympic champion.

== Career ==
She became Olympic Champion in the women's singles event and in the team relay at the 2014 Winter Olympics in Sochi and at the 2018 Winter Olympics in Pyeongchang and won a bronze medal in the women's singles event at the 2010 Winter Olympics in Vancouver. She subsequently won another individual gold at the 2022 Winter Olympics, becoming the only woman luger ever to win three individual Olympic gold medals. She is the most successful and decorated female Olympic luger, with five gold medals and one bronze.

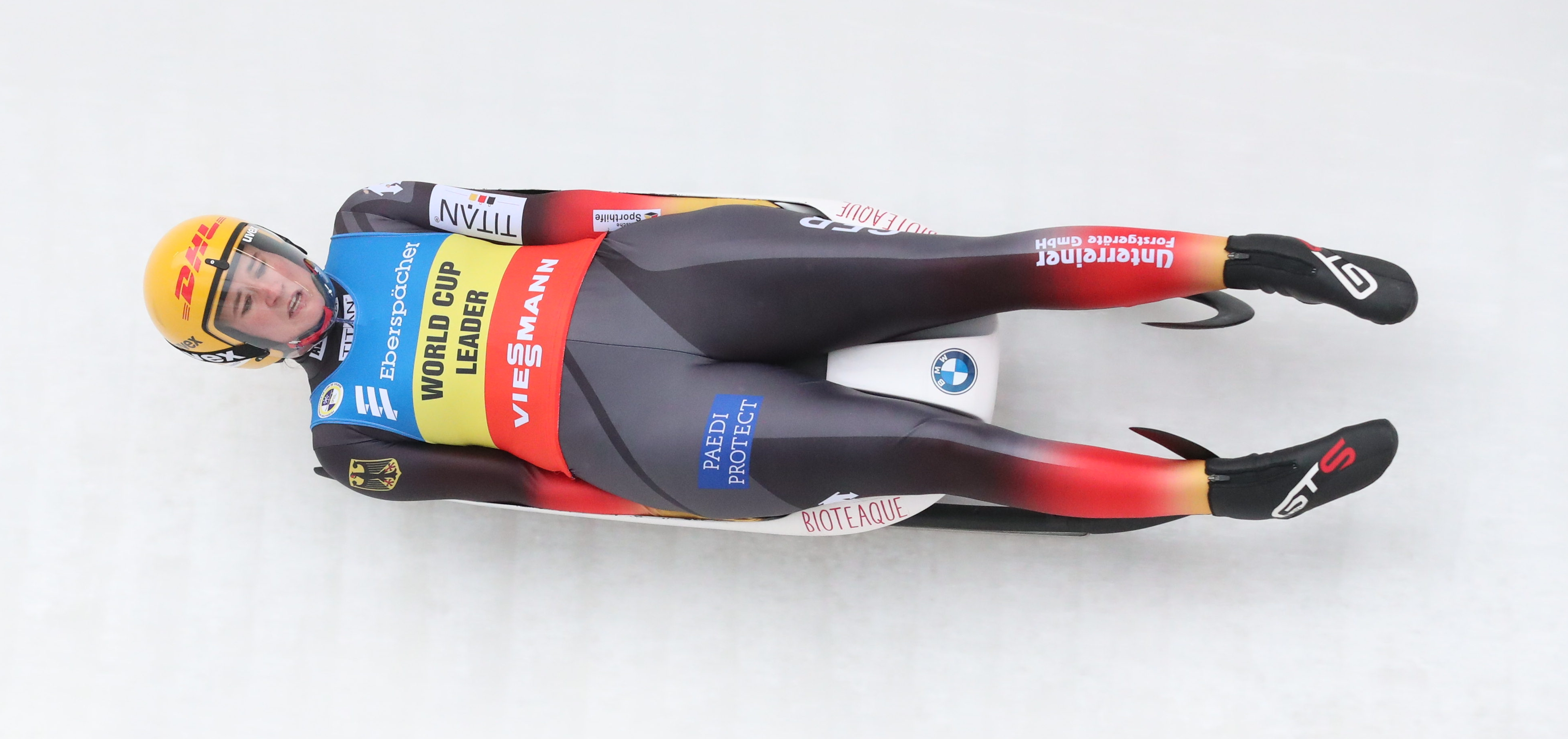
Geisenberger competing in the Oberhof II Luge World Cup during January 2021

Geisenberger has won a total of seven gold, six silver, and one bronze medals at the FIL European Luge Championships. She has also accrued sixteen medals at the FIL World Luge Championships, including nine gold, five silver, and two bronze medals. She is the most decorated and most successful female luger in championship history.

After four consecutive seasons finishing second in the overall classification of the Luge World Cup, she finally won her first title in the 2012–13 season after completing an outstanding scoreboard with six wins and three-second places. She has won a total of 7 world cups in singles and 3 in sprint, both of which are all-time records in women's competitions.

After missing the 2019–20 season because she was having a baby, Geisenberger resumed competing and won the 2020–21 Luge World Cup.

On September 24, 2023, Geisenberger announced her retirement.

== Personal life ==
When Geisenberger was six, her family moved to the city of Miesbach, where Gert Schabbehard of the local Club RRT Miesbach introduced her to the sport at age 10. After a very successful junior career in which she won 14 Junior World Cup competitions and three Junior World Championships, she was promoted to the senior German team. Her first senior competition was on 20 January 2007 at the Altenberg, Germany World Cup, where she came in second.

Geisenberger is currently a police officer of the German Federal Police at the Sports School in Bad Endorf.

On 1 June 2018, she married Markus Scheer in Schliersee.

In October 2019, she announced that she would not race in 2019–20 season due to pregnancy. She gave birth to her son Leo in May 2020. In July 2022, she announced that she was pregnant for a second time and subsequently would be missing 2022-23 season.

On October 29, 2025, it was announced that Geisenberger would be joining EuroSport's coverage of the 2026 Winter Olympics as an Olympic expert.

=== World Cup ===
Season	Singles									Sprint				Team relay						Points	Overall	Singles	Sprint
Season	1	2	3	4	5	6	7	8	9	1	2	3	4	1	2	3	4	5	6	Points	Overall	Singles	Sprint
2006–07	–	–	–	–	–	–	2	–	8	—N/a	—N/a	—N/a	—N/a	–	–	–	–	—N/a	—N/a	127	27th	—N/a	—N/a
2007–08	2	3	8	3	2	3	10	4	—N/a	—N/a	—N/a	—N/a	—N/a	–	–	–	–	—N/a	—N/a	518	3rd	—N/a	—N/a
2008–09	2	4	1	2	2	2	1	2	1	—N/a	—N/a	—N/a	—N/a	–	–	–	1	1	—N/a	785	2nd	—N/a	—N/a
2009–10	2	1	2	2	2	1	3	1	—N/a	—N/a	—N/a	—N/a	—N/a	–	–	–	–	–	—N/a	710	2nd	—N/a	—N/a
2010–11	2	2	4	4	1	2	2	3	6	—N/a	—N/a	—N/a	—N/a	–	–	1	–	–	–	680	2nd	—N/a	—N/a
2011–12	4	1	6	2	1	3	2	1	4	—N/a	—N/a	—N/a	—N/a	–	1	–	1	–	3	710	2nd	—N/a	—N/a
2012–13	2	1	1	2	1	1	1	1	2	—N/a	—N/a	—N/a	—N/a	–	1	1	1	1	–	855	1st	1st	—N/a
2013–14	1	1	1	1	1	1	2	1	–	—N/a	—N/a	—N/a	—N/a	1	9	1	1	1	3	785	1st	1st	—N/a
2014–15	1	1	1	1	1	1	5	1	2	1	3	3	—N/a	1	1	1	1	–	–	1080	1st	1st	
2015–16	2	4	4	1	3	2	3	4	2	4	4	1	N/A	–	–	–	2	–	–	895	1st	1st	2nd
2016–17	1	5	2	4	1	1	1	2	1	3	8	2	N/A	–	1	2	1	1	1	982	1st	1st	1st
2017–18	1	1	1	3	1	1	2	2	2	3	3	3	2	1	1	–	DSQ	–	2	1120	1st	1st	1st
2018–19	1	1	2	2	8	2	2	1	1	1	1	3	N/A	2	–	–	3	2	2	1052	1st	1st	1st
2020–21	2	2	2	2	2	2	1	1	13	2	2	2	N/A	–	4	–	–	3	CNX	995	1st	1st	2nd
2021–22	26	8	2	4	3	2	4	4	1	6	4	2	3	–	–	–	–	–	2	772	3rd	3rd	3rd

Note: Prior to 2020/21 season, to be classified in sprint standings athletes must compete on all sprint events throughout the season.
