= Martina Kocher =

Swiss luger

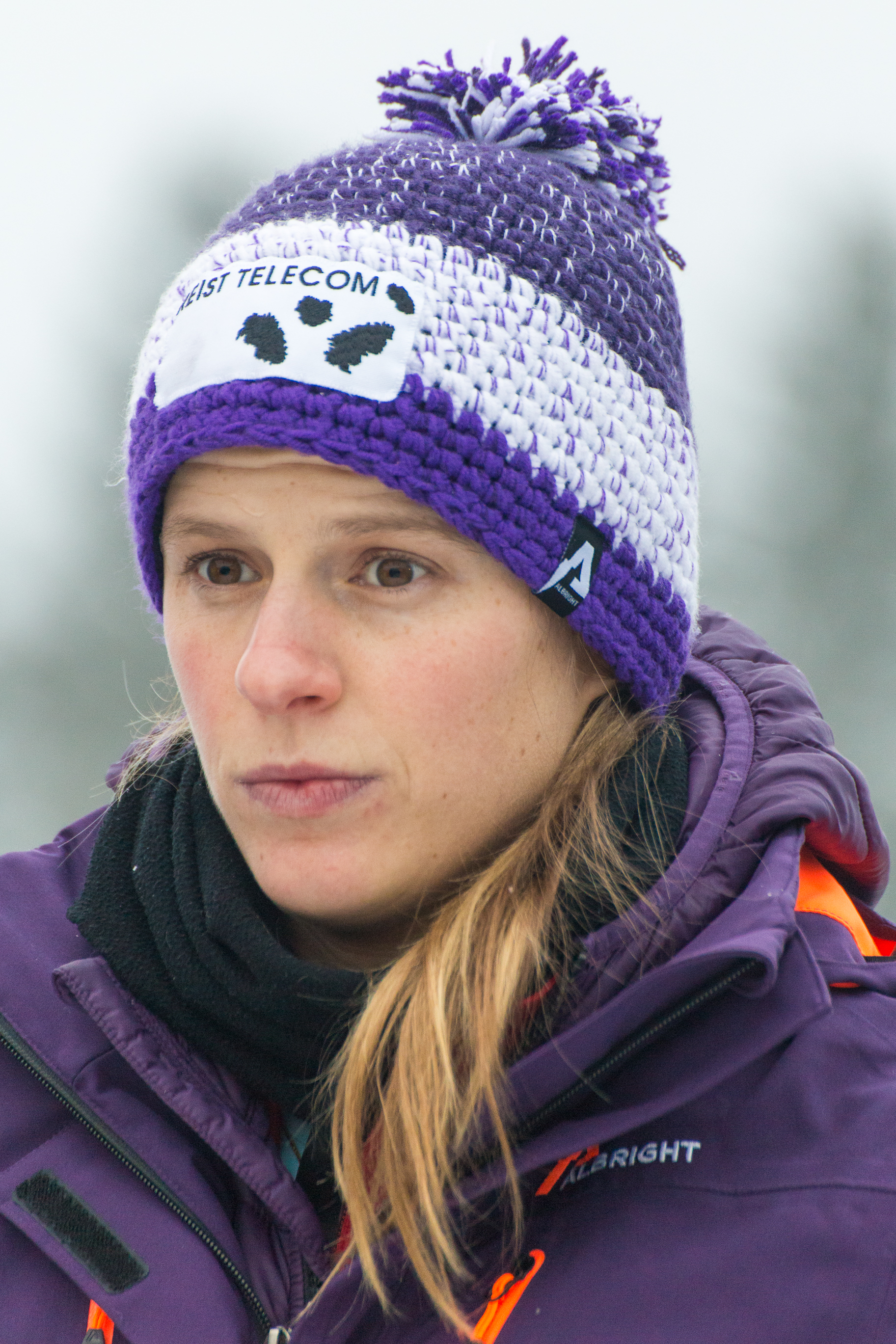

Medal record

Women's luge

Representing Switzerland

World Championships
| Gold medal – first place | 2016 Königssee | Sprint |
| Silver medal – second place | 2016 Königssee | Singles |
| Silver medal – second place | 2017 Igls | Sprint |

Martina Kocher (born 14 March 1985 in Biel/Bienne) is a Swiss former luger who competed between 1999 and 2018. She is Switzerland's most successful luger. She first slid on a luge at the age of nine at St. Moritz, after taking an interest in the sport when her father Heinz, a former bobsledder-turned-coach of bobsleigh and luge, took her along to a training course he was leading.

Competing in four Winter Olympics, she earned her best finish of seventh in the women's singles event at Vancouver in 2010. She also took ninth places on her Olympic debut at the 2006 Games at Cesana Pariol and at the 2014 Olympics at Sanki, and was 11th at her final Games, the 2018 Games at the Alpensia Sliding Centre.

From 2014 until her retirement, Kocher broke away from the Swiss Sledding Association's set-up, organising her own coaching and support team, being coached by her father and former luger Stefan Höhener. For many years she trained alongside the German luge team.

At the 2016 FIL World Luge Championships at Königssee, Kocher took the gold medal in the sprint and the silver in the full length singles event. At the following year's World Championships at Innsbruck, she finished second in the sprint. The latter result was considered a surprise as the short track at Innsbruck was not considered to suit Kocher, who was by far the lightest luger in top-level competition during her career. Her best finish at the FIL European Luge Championships was eighth in the women's singles event at Sigulda in 2010. Despite her World Championship success, she never achieved a Luge World Cup podium: her best World Cup result was a fourth place in Königssee in January 2018.

In August 2018 Kocher announced her retirement from competition, becoming a teacher for teenagers with behavioural problems.
