= Justin Snith =

Canadian luger (born 1891)

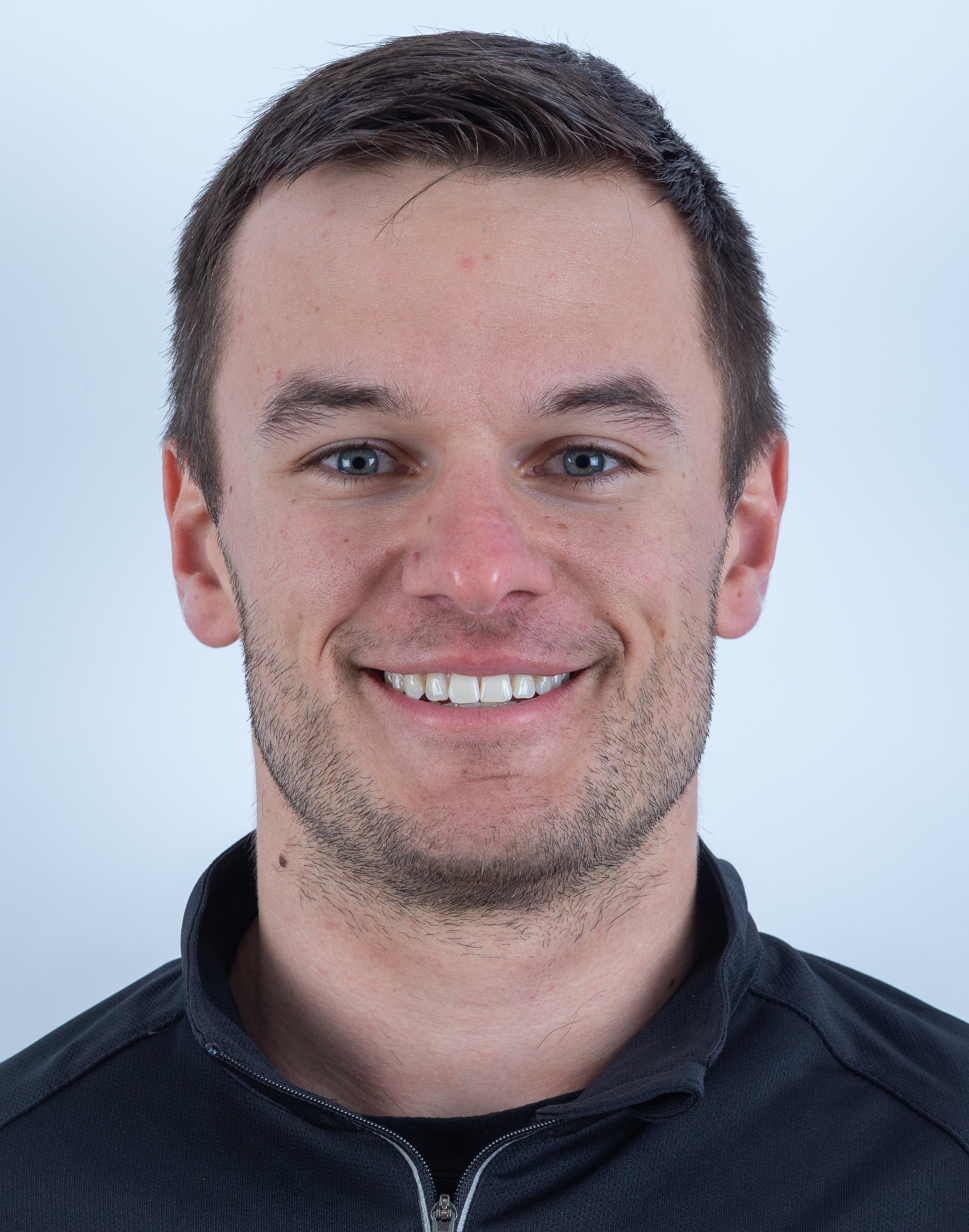

Medal record

Men's luge

Representing Canada

Olympic Games
Silver medal – second place	2018 Pyeongchang	Mixed team

World Championships
Silver medal – second place	2013 Whistler	Mixed team
Bronze medal – third place	2012 Altenberg	Mixed team
Bronze medal – third place	2015 Sigulda	Mixed team
Bronze medal – third place	2016 Königssee	Mixed team

Justin Snith (born December 8, 1991, in Calgary, Alberta) is a Canadian luger who has competed since 2008. He has three World Cup doubles podium finishes.

Snith qualified for the 2010 Winter Olympics with Tristan Walker, where they finished 15th. Snith also qualified for the 2014 Winter Olympics in Sochi, Russia. He competed in both the doubles race and the team relay (which made its Olympic debut in 2014). He and his teammate Tristan Walker missed the podium in the doubles event by just five-hundredths (0.05) of a second, achieving the best-ever Olympic result by a Canadian sled in the event. They joined Alex Gough and Samuel Edney and had another fourth-place finish in the mixed team relay. The team won silver at the 2013 World Championships, following bronze in 2012.

Snith, Gough, Edney and Walker again won silver in the mixed team relay at the 2018 Winter Olympics, at the Alpensia Sliding Centre near Pyeongchang, South Korea.

== 2022 Olympics ==
In January 2022, Snith was named to Canada's 2022 Olympic team.
