= Patrick Gruber =

Italian luger (born 1978)

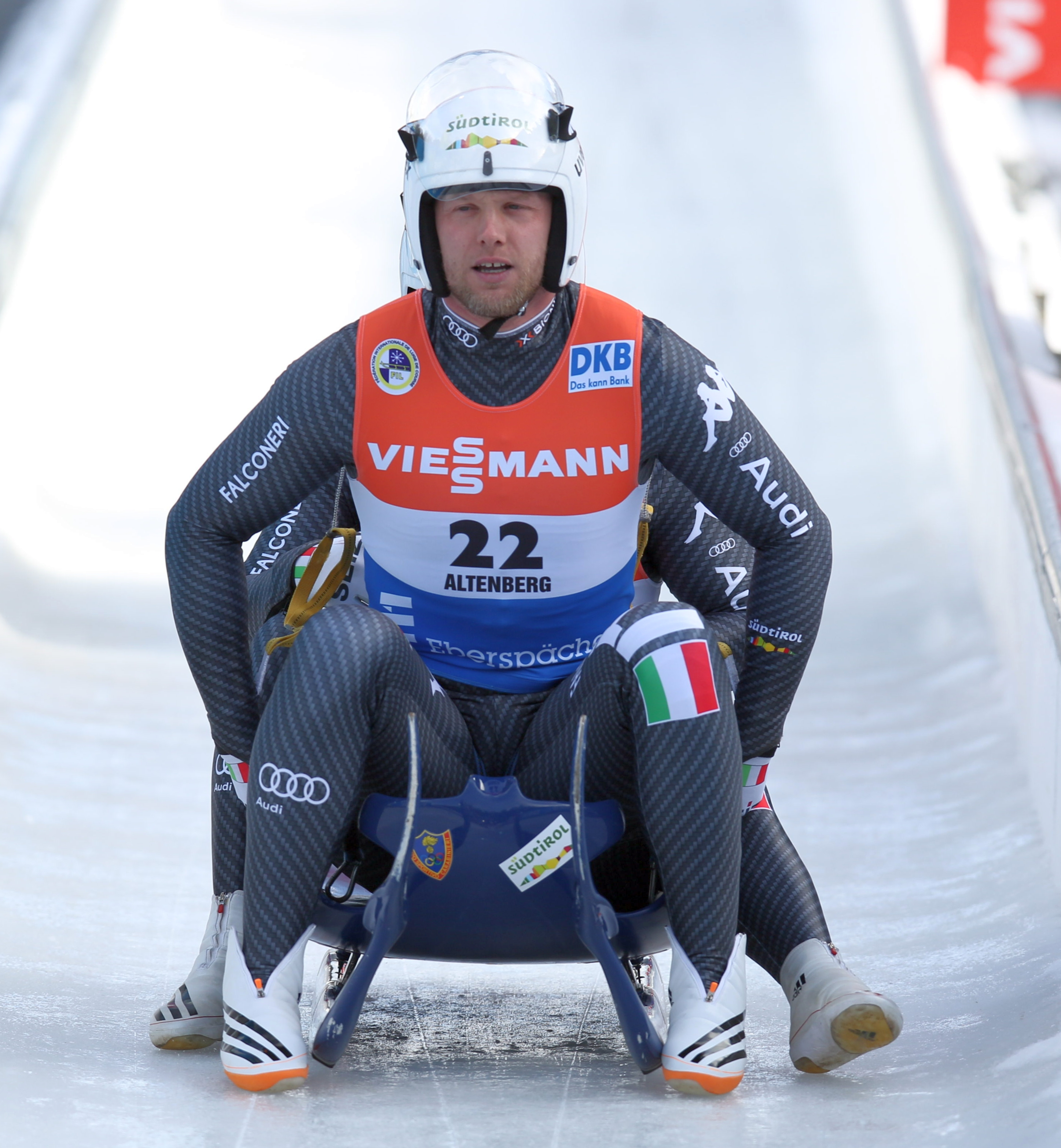

Medal record

Men's luge

Representing Italy

World Championships
Silver medal – second place	2007 Igls	Mixed team
Silver medal – second place	2011 Cesana	Doubles
Bronze medal – third place	2004 Nagano	Mixed team
Bronze medal – third place	2005 Park City	Mixed team
Bronze medal – third place	2015 Sigulda	Doubles
Bronze medal – third place	2016 Königssee	Doubles
Bronze medal – third place	2016 Königssee	Doubles' sprint

European Championships
Gold medal – first place	2008 Cesana	Doubles
Gold medal – first place	2014 Sigulda	Doubles
Silver medal – second place	2004 Oberhof	Doubles
Silver medal – second place	2004 Oberhof	Mixed team
Silver medal – second place	2006 Winterberg	Mixed team
Silver medal – second place	2013 Oberhof	Mixed team
Bronze medal – third place	2006 Winterberg	Doubles
Bronze medal – third place	2012 Paromonovo	Mixed team
Bronze medal – third place	2014 Sigulda	Mixed team

Patrick Gruber (born 31 January 1978 in Bruneck) is an Italian luger who has competed since 1997. He won seven medals at the FIL World Luge Championships with two silvers (Men's doubles: 2011, Mixed team: 2007) and five bronzes (Men's doubles: 2015, 2016, Doubles sprint: 2016, Mixed team: 2004, 2005).

At the FIL European Luge Championships, Gruber won nine medals with two golds (Men's doubles: 2008, 2014), four silvers (Men's doubles: 2004; Mixed team: 2004, 2006, 2013), and three bronzes (Men's doubles: 2006; Mixed team: 2012, 2014).

Gruber has competed in three Winter Olympics, earning his best finish of fourth in the men's doubles event at Vancouver in 2010.

He won the overall men's doubles Luge World Cup title in 2004-5.
