= Ekaterina Baturina (luger) =

Russian luger (born 1992)

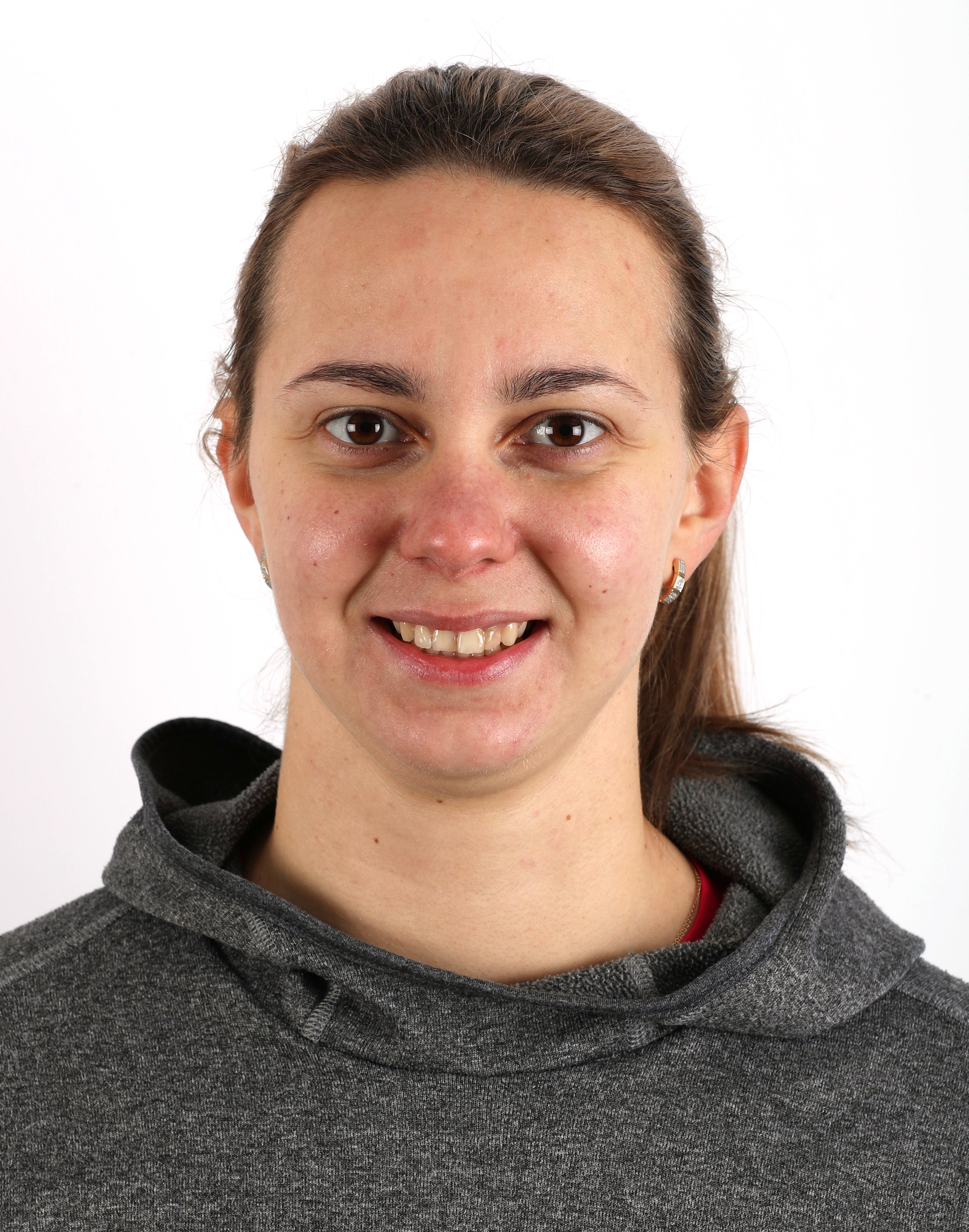
- Baturina in 2018

Personal information
- Full name: Ekaterina Sergeyevna Baturina
- Nationality: Russian
- Born: 28 July 1992 (age 32); Krasnoyarsk, Russia
- Height: 1.78 m (5 ft 10 in)
- Weight: 74 kg (163 lb)

Sport
- Country: Russia
- Sport: Luge
- Event: Women's singles

Ekaterina Sergeyevna Baturina (Russian: Екатерина Сергеевна Батурина; born 28 July 1992) is a Russian luger.

Baturina competed at the 2014 Winter Olympics for Russia. In the women's singles she placed 11th.

As of September 2020, Baturina's best performance at the FIL World Luge Championships is 8th, in the 2019 Championships.

As of September 2015, Baturina's best Luge World Cup overall finish is 13th in 2014–15.
