= Viera Gbúrová =

Slovak luger (born 1991)

Personal information
- Nationality: Slovak
- Born: 25 September 1991 (age 34) Gelnica, Czechoslovakia
- Height: 1.70 m (5 ft 7 in)
- Weight: 70 kg (154 lb)

Sport
- Country: Slovakia
- Sport: Luge
- Event: Women's singles

Viera Gbúrová (born 25 September 1991 in Gelnica) is a Slovak luger.

Viera Gbúrová competed at the 2014 Winter Olympics for Slovakia. In the Women's singles she placed 25th. She was also a part of the Slovak relay team, which finished 10th.

As of September 2014, Gbúrová's best performance at the FIL World Luge Championships is 18th, in the 2012 Championships.

As of September 2014, Gbúrová's best Luge World Cup overall finish is 21st in 2011–12.
