= Alex Gough (luger) =

Canadian luger (born 1987)

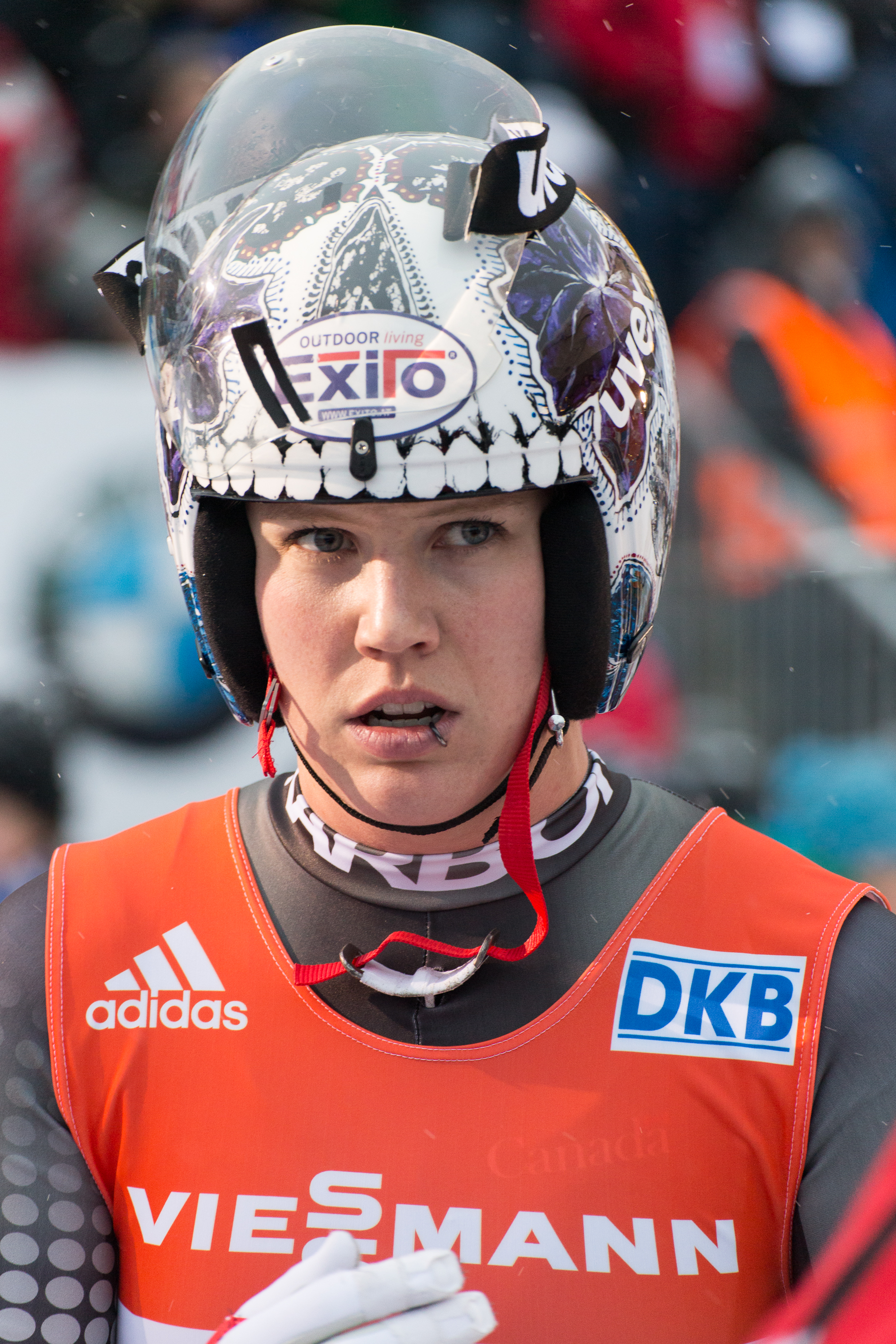
- Gough in 2016

Personal information
- Born: May 12, 1987 (age 39) Calgary, Alberta, Canada
- Height: 171 cm (5 ft 7 in)
- Weight: 72 kg (159 lb)
- Website: AlexGough.com
Medal record
Olympic Games
Silver medal – second place	2018 Pyeongchang	Mixed team
Bronze medal – third place	2018 Pyeongchang	Singles
World Championships
Silver medal – second place	2013 Whistler	Mixed team
Bronze medal – third place	2011 Cesana	Singles
Bronze medal – third place	2012 Altenberg	Mixed team
Bronze medal – third place	2013 Whistler	Singles
Bronze medal – third place	2015 Sigulda	Mixed team
Bronze medal – third place	2016 Königssee	Mixed team

Alex Gough (born May 12, 1987) is a retired Canadian luger who competed between 2002 and 2018. Gough is a two-time Olympic luge medalist, winning bronze in the women's singles event and silver in the team relay at the 2018 Winter Olympics. She was the first Canadian to win a luge medal at the Olympics. Gough won a bronze medal in the women's singles event at the FIL World Luge Championships 2011 in Cesana, the first ever for a Canadian woman and only the second overall (Miroslav Zajonc was the first with his gold in the men's singles event in 1983). Gough has won a total of six World Championship medals, two bronze in women's singles (2011 and 2013) and a silver and three bronze in the mixed team relay events.

== Career ==
Looking for a sport to compete in as a youth, Gough competed in a variety of sports before settling on luge. Family friend Sam Edney was participating in luge so her mother signed her up for a luge camp at the Canada Olympic Park when she was 13. She was seen as a surprise qualifier at the 2006 Winter Olympics in Turin, with most expecting 2010 to be her first Olympics. As a surprise member of the 2006 Olympic team for Canada, the 18 year old Gough finished an aspiring 20th place.

Gough would continue building on her career towards the 2010 Winter Olympics taking place on home soil in Vancouver. She was hoping to have her Olympic medal breakthrough at these games but following the death of Nodar Kumaritashvili in training, the start and course was changed. This meant that Gough was now essentially sliding on a new track, therefore she lost her home track advantage and finished in 18th place. Gough continued to forward herself as a luge athlete, despite the Olympic disappointment. Continuing to build her career, she became the first Canadian to win a medal in luge at the FIL World Luge Championships when she won bronze at the 2011 World Championships. Gough said of her bronze medal after that: "It feels so good, and I'm absolutely pumped to finish third. I've been sliding well all week, and I had the confidence that I knew I can be there on the podium. I love this track. It is fast and fun and this is just a very proud moment for me and the program."

She would build on this first with another big first when Gough won her first World Cup event during the 2010–11 Luge World Cup season. She was the first Canadian to ever win a World Cup luge event. The victory broke a 105 race German winning streak in women's luge events. Gough, now with a proven pedigree, would continue to perform on the world stage. She won bronze in the mixed team relay at the 2012 World Championships. At the 2013 World Championships Gough was a double medalist, winning silver in the mixed team relay and a bronze in the women's singles.

On her way to the 2014 Winter Olympics in Sochi, Gough looked like a solid medal hopeful based on her recent results and her second overall position in the 2013–14 Luge World Cup. In Russia at the Olympics Gough would nearly win a medal in women's singles, finishing fourth. She would also participate in the mixed team relay event where she would again finish in fourth place. Despite the disappointingly close finishes at the Olympics, Gough would go on to persevere on the world stage. As part of the Canadian luge relay team she would win two more bronze medals in 2015 and 2016 at the World Championships.

=== 2018 Winter Olympics ===
During the buildup to the 2018 Winter Olympics it became known of a covert doping involving the Russian athletes at the Olympics in Sochi. It became apparent that two members of the Russian team that finished ahead of the Canadians in Sochi were part of 46 athletes being investigated as part of the McLaren Report on Russian doping in 2014. Eventually it was determined Albert Demchenko and Tatiana Ivanova were determined to have been part of the doping scandal, boosting the Canadians into a delayed bronze medal. However Gough and the Canadians would ride a roller coaster of emotions when the Russians appealed with the Court of Arbitration for Sport (CAS) and 28 Russian athletes' results were reinstated. This meant that the Canadians original position of fourth was confirmed by the CAS.

Gough would build on her heartbreak of the doping scandal going into the Olympics. She finally won her first Olympic medal, a bronze in the women's luge event. Gough spoke of her long road to Canada's first Olympic medal in luge saying "Ten years of grinding — hard, tough work, a lot of ups and downs — and finally winning an Olympic medal, the first for Canada, unbelievable." The medal run would continue in South Korea when Gough won silver in the mixed team relay with Edney, Justin Snith, and Tristan Walker. The result was redemption for the Canadians after the fourth-place finish and unknown result in Sochi following suspected doping ahead of them by the Russians. Gough said of the relay win for her and her teammates that "I wanted it so bad for them. I put together the best run I could. They followed it up, and we got the redemption from four years ago."

== Personal ==
Gough lives and trains in Calgary, where she attended high school with other top athletes, at the National Sport School. Currently, Gough is an engineering student at the University of Calgary.
