= Ulla Zirne =

Latvian luger

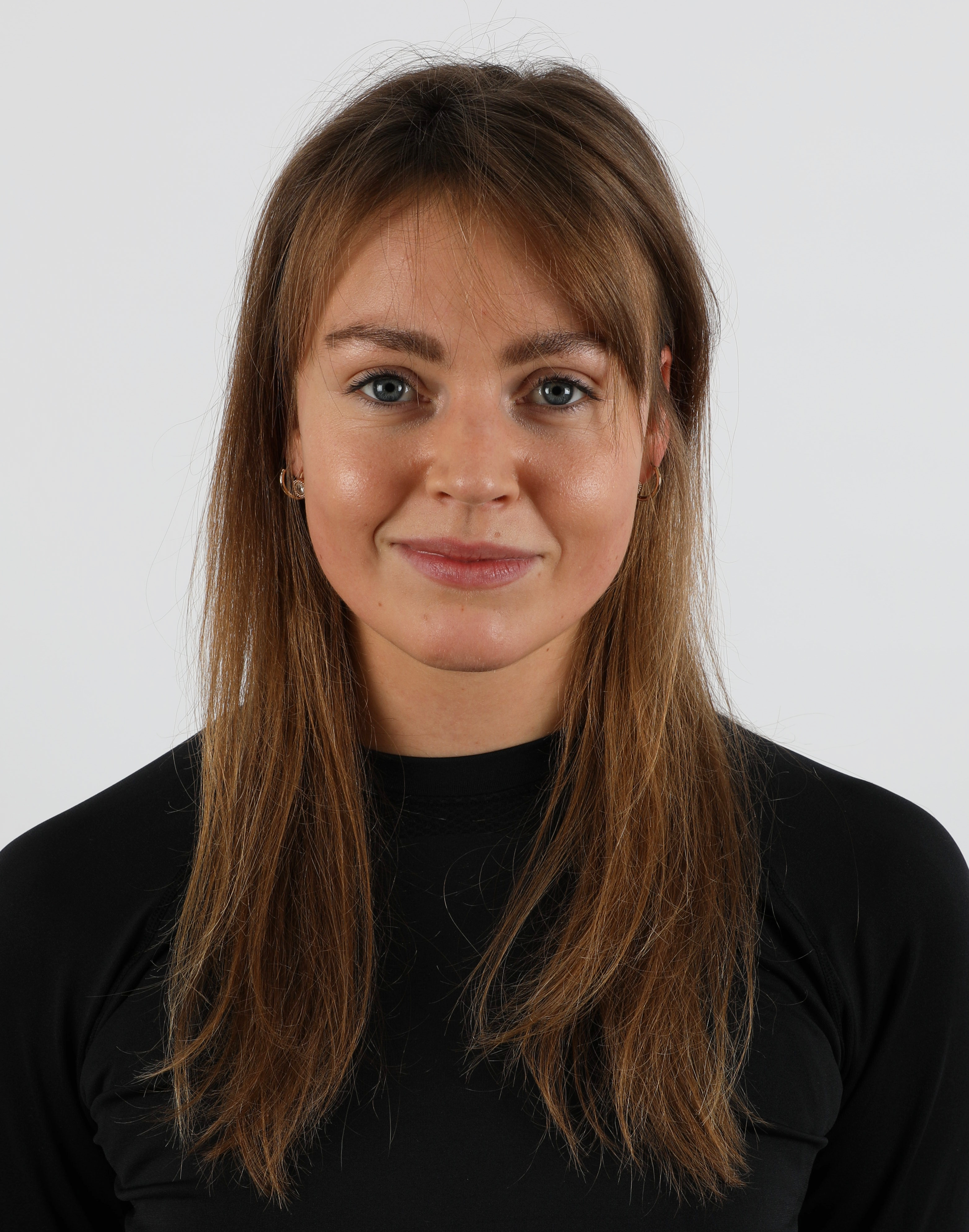
- Zirne in 2018

Personal information
- Born: August 6, 1995 (age 30) Riga, Latvia
Medal record
Women's luge
Representing Latvia
European Championships
Bronze medal – third place	2020 Lillehammer	Mixed team

Ulla Zirne (born 6 August 1995) is a Latvian luger. She was born in Riga. She competed at the 2014 Winter Olympics in Sochi, in women's singles, and at the 2018 Winter Olympics, in Pyeongchang, in the mixed team relay.
