= Birgit Platzer =

Austrian luger

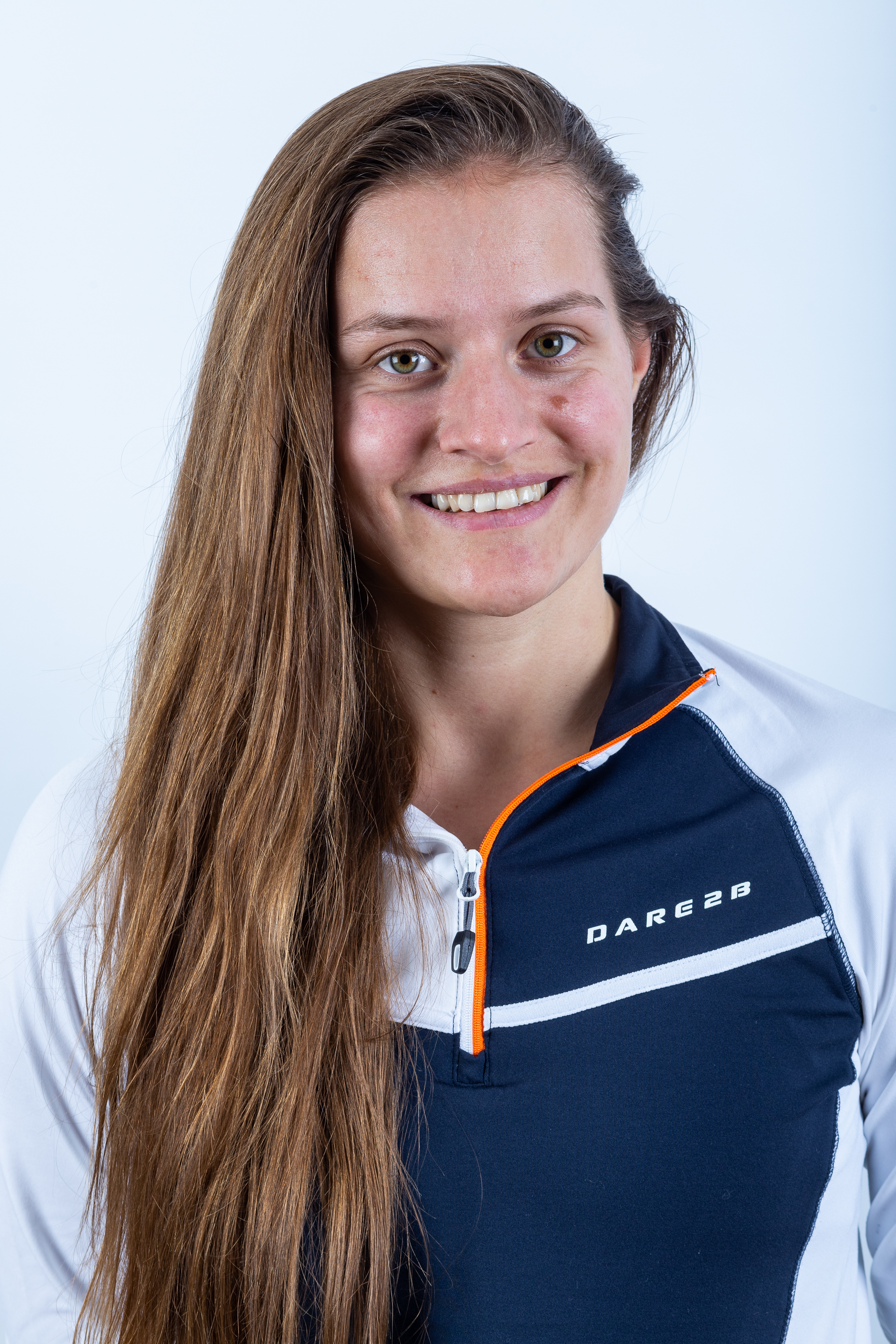
- Platzer in 2018

Personal information
- Born: 14 October 1992 (age 33) Kirchdorf an der Krems, Austria
- Height: 1.71 m (5 ft 7 in)
- Weight: 50 kg (110 lb)

Sport
- Country: Austria
- Sport: Luge
- Event: Women's singles

Birgit Platzer (born 14 October 1992 in Kirchdorf an der Krems) is an Austrian luger.

Platzer competed for Austria at the 2014 Winter Olympics. In the Women's singles she placed 23rd.

As of September 2014, her best performance at the FIL World Luge Championships is 16th, in the 2012 Championships, and her best Luge World Cup overall finish is 19th in 2012–13.

Platzer also competed for Austria at the 2018 Winter Olympics.
