= Natalia Wojtuściszyn =

Polish luger

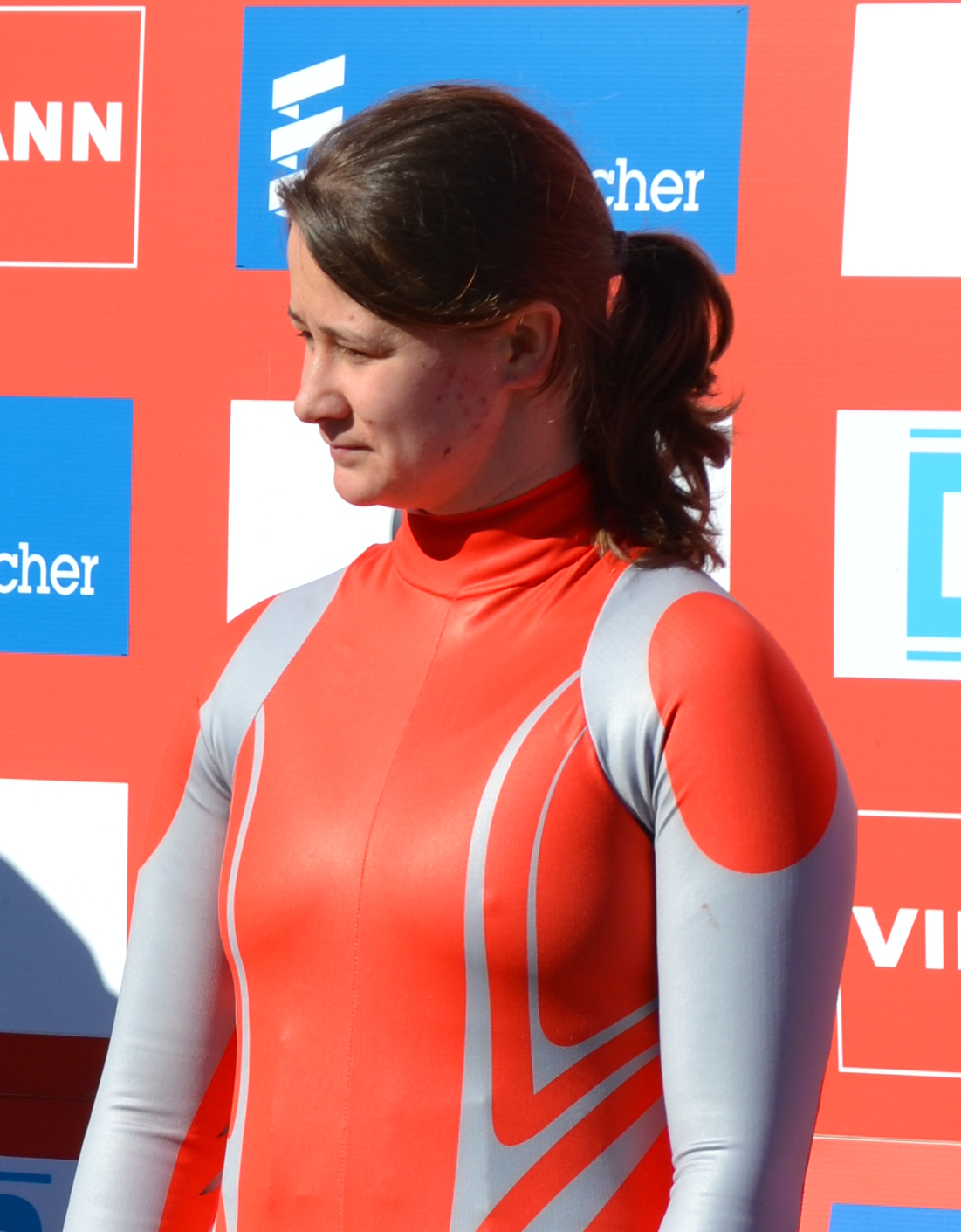
Wojtuściszyn at the 2014 luge world cup in Altenberg.

Natalia Wojtuściszyn (born 2 February 1993 in Gorzów Wielkopolski) is a Polish luger. She competed at the 2014 Winter Olympics in Sochi, in women's singles and team relay.
