= Miriam Kastlunger =

Austrian luger (born 1994)

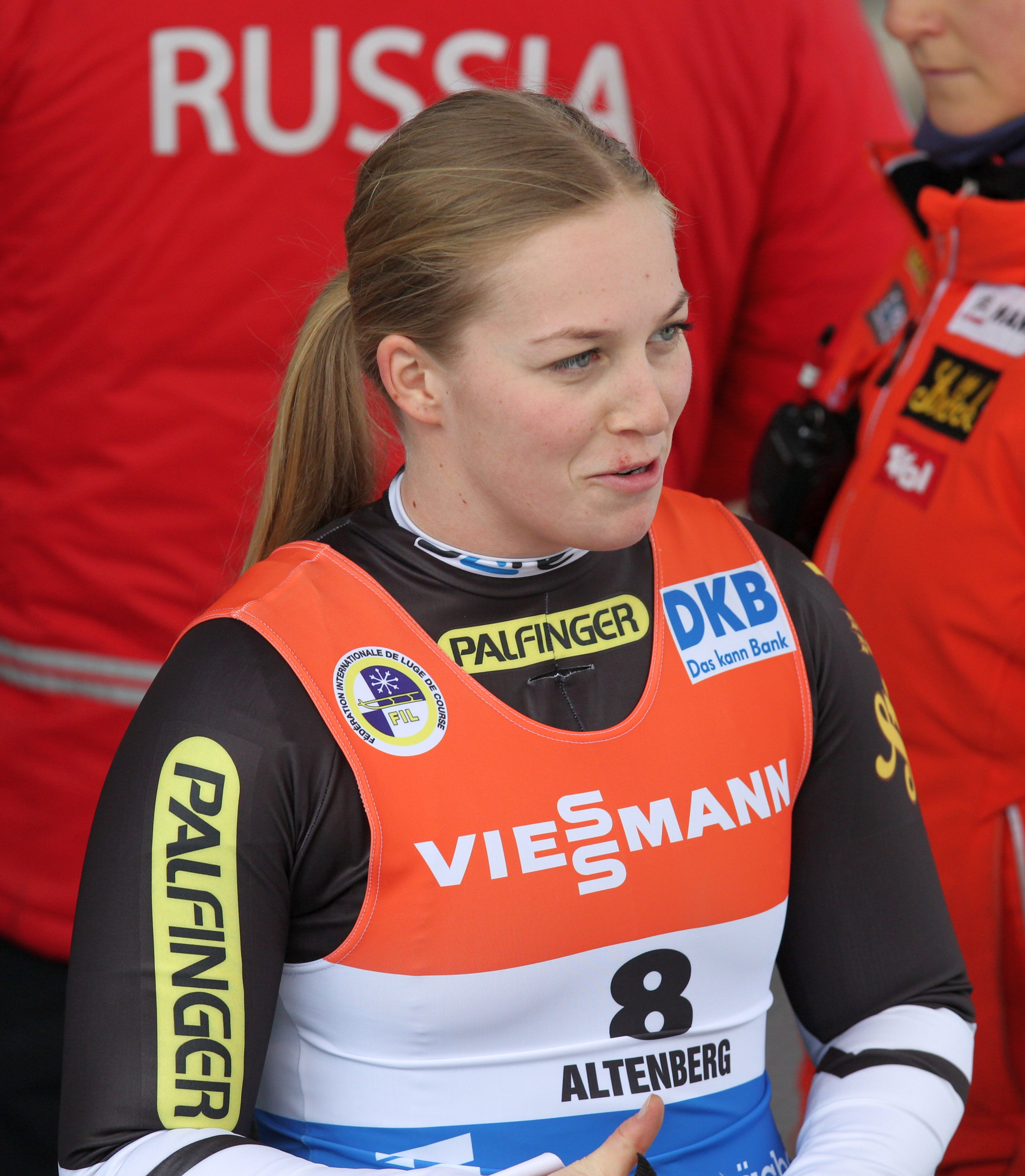
Kastlunger in 2017

Miriam-Stefanie Kastlunger (born 2 March 1994, Innsbruck) is an Austrian luger. She represented Austria at the 2014 Winter Olympics in Sochi in women's and team relay competitions. In the women's singles, she finished 17th. In the team relay, together with Wolfgang Kindl (men's single) and Andreas Linger / Wolfgang Linger (double), she became 7th.

Kastlunger was both women's and team relay champion in luge at the 2012 Winter Youth Olympics which took place in Innsbruck.
