= Elīza Tīruma =

Latvian luger (born 1990)

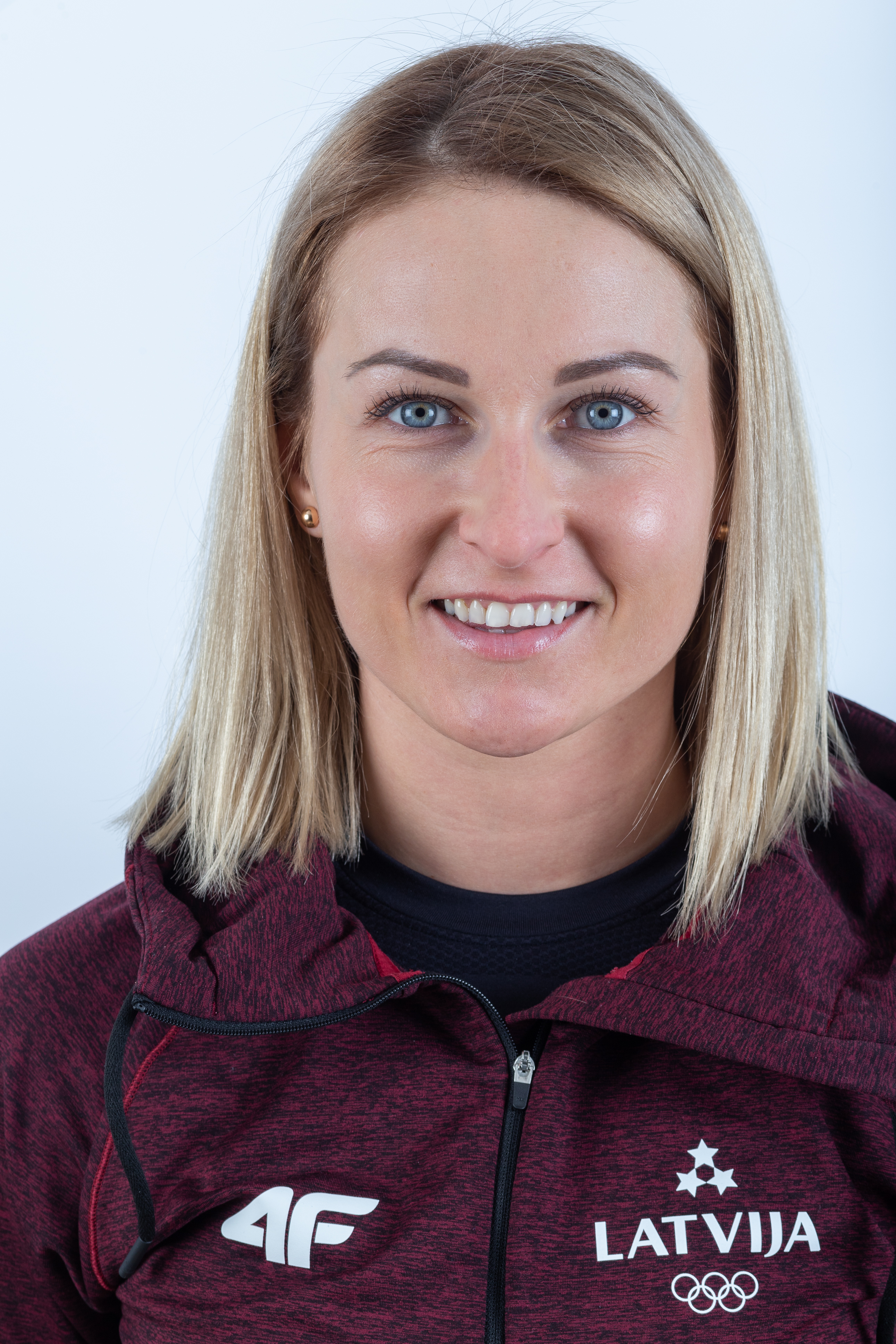
- Tīruma in 2018

Personal information
- Nationality: Latvian
- Born: 21 August 1990 (age 35) Sigulda, Latvia
- Height: 1.70 m (5 ft 7 in)
- Weight: 72 kg (159 lb)

Sport
- Country: Latvia
- Sport: Luge
- Event: Singles
Medal record
Representing Latvia
Olympic Games
Bronze medal – third place	2014 Sochi	Team relay
Bronze medal – third place	2022 Beijing	Team relay
World Championships
Silver medal – second place	2016 Königssee	Team relay
Bronze medal – third place	2013 Whistler	Team relay
Bronze medal – third place	2020 Sochi	Sprint
European Championships
Silver medal – second place	2014 Sigulda	Team relay
Silver medal – second place	2016 Altenberg	Singles
Silver medal – second place	2016 Altenberg	Team relay
Silver medal – second place	2021 Sigulda	Team relay
Bronze medal – third place	2015 Sochi	Team relay
Bronze medal – third place	2017 Königssee	Team relay
Bronze medal – third place	2019 Oberhof	Team relay

Elīza Tīruma (also Cauce, born 21 August 1990) is a Latvian former luger who has competed since 2006. She won a bronze medal at the 2014 Winter Olympics in the team relay event and placed 12th individually. Her sister Maija Tīruma is also a former Olympic luger.
