= Raluca Strămăturaru =

Romanian luger (born 1985)

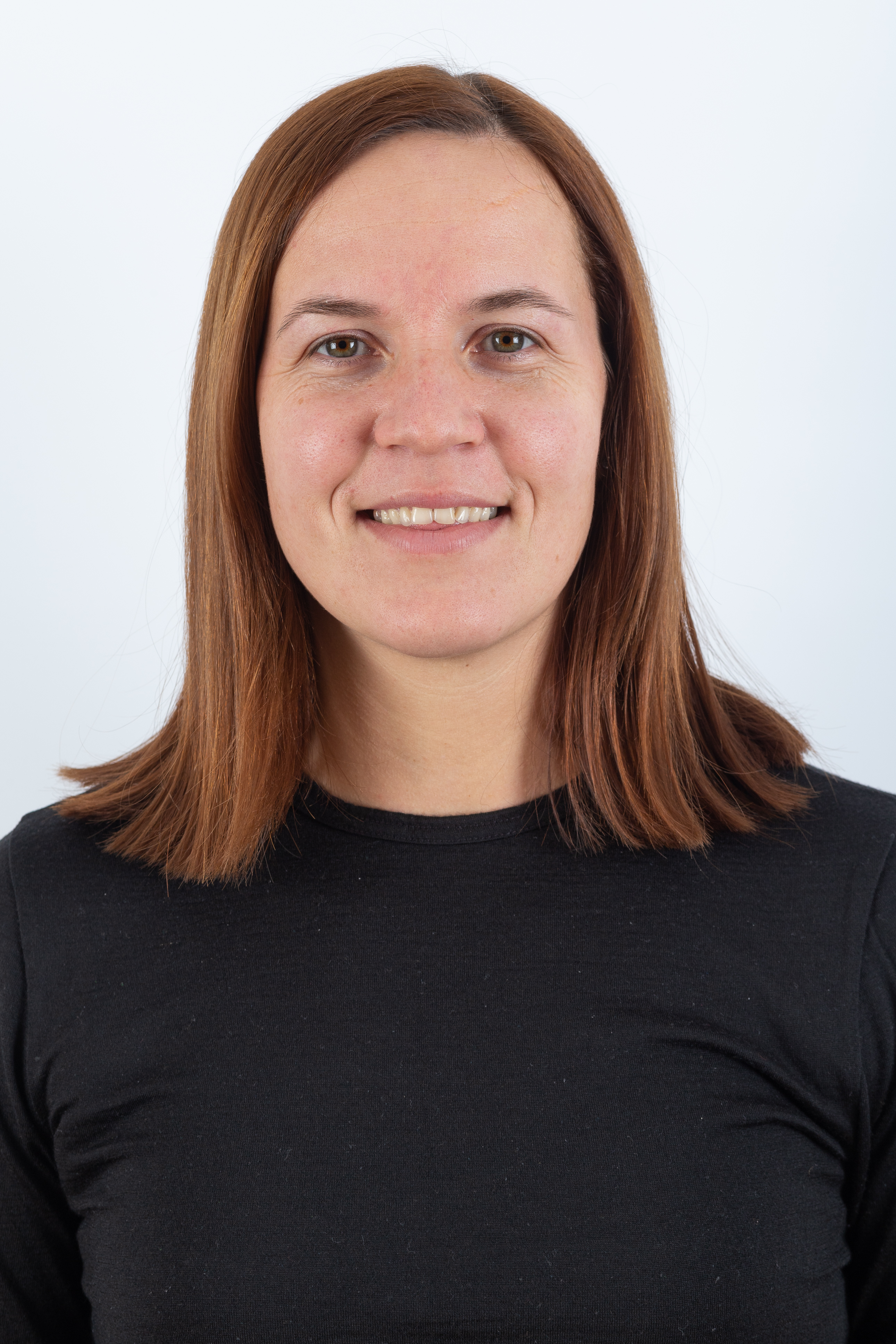
- Strămăturaru in 2018

Personal information
- Full name: Raluca Nicoleta Strămăturaru
- Born: 22 November 1985 (age 40) Sinaia
- Height: 172 cm (5 ft 8 in)
- Weight: 78 kg (172 lb)

Raluca Nicoleta Strămăturaru (born 22 November 1985) is a Romanian luger who has competed since 1996. Her younger sister Violeta Strămăturaru is also a luger.

Strămăturaru's best Luge World Cup season finish was 23rd in women's singles in 2007–08. Her best finish at the FIL World Luge Championships was 22nd in women's singles at Oberhof in 2008. Her best finish at the FIL European Luge Championships was 17th in women's singles at Cesana Pariol in 2008.

Strămăturaru qualified for the 2010 Winter Olympics where she finished 21st.

At her 3rd successive appearance at the Olympics, she ended up with her best career result and the best result for Romania in Winter Olympics in the last 24 years: 7th place at 2018 Winter Olympics and also 10th place(3rd in run1 for her) with the team relay. This performance was a strong one for her country, considering the circumstances there. In the same world cup season, Raluca Strămăturaru finished 6th at Lillehammer2018, which represents her best result in the world cup contest. She also took 10th place at Altenberg2017 and 7th place in the sprint event from Winterberg2017. All those results, in the 2017-2018 season, made her end up 1st in the Nations Cup (the 2nd competition after the World Cup), where she gained the overall title.
