= 2016 FIL World Luge Championships =

International luge competition

The 2016 FIL World Luge Championships took place under the auspices of the International Luge Federation at Königssee, Germany from 29 to 31 January 2016.

== Schedule ==
Four events will be held.

Date	Time	Events
29 January	09:00	Sprint qualification
29 January	14:45	Sprint final
30 January	12:45	Doubles first run
30 January	14:00	Doubles second run
30 January	15:20	Women first run
30 January	17:05	Women second run
31 January	10:15	Men first run
31 January	12:25	Men second run
31 January	14:00	Team relay

== Medal summary ==
=== Medal table ===
Rank	Nation	Gold	Silver	Bronze	Total
1	Germany (GER)	6	4	2	12
2	Switzerland (SUI)	1	1	0	2
3	Austria (AUT)	0	1	1	2
4	Latvia (LAT)	0	1	0	1
5	Italy (ITA)	0	0	2	2
6	Canada (CAN)	0	0	1	1
6	Russia (RUS)	0	0	1	1
Totals (7 entries)		7	7	7	21

=== Medalists ===
Event	Gold		Silver		Bronze	
Men's singles	Felix Loch; Germany	1:38.864	Ralf Palik; Germany	1:39.287	Wolfgang Kindl; Austria	1:39.553
Men's sprint	Felix Loch; Germany	38.574	Andi Langenhan; Germany	38.794	Ralf Palik; Germany	38.808
Women's singles	Natalie Geisenberger; Germany	1:40.799	Martina Kocher; Switzerland	1:41.038	Tatiana Ivanova; Russia	1:41.055
Women's sprint	Martina Kocher; Switzerland	39.451	Natalie Geisenberger; Germany	39.486	Dajana Eitberger; Germany	39.537
Doubles	Tobias Wendl/Tobias Arlt; Germany	1:38.975	Toni Eggert/Sascha Benecken; Germany	1:39.586	Christian Oberstolz/Patrick Gruber; Italy	1:40.728
Doubles' sprint	Tobias Wendl/Tobias Arlt; Germany	39.032	Peter Penz/Georg Fischler; Austria	39.261	Christian Oberstolz/Patrick Gruber; Italy	39.428
Team relay	Germany; Natalie Geisenberger; Felix Loch; Tobias Wendl/Tobias Arlt	2:44.062	Latvia; Elīza Tīruma; Inārs Kivlenieks; Andris Šics/Juris Šics	2:45.614	Canada; Alex Gough; Mitchel Malyk; Tristan Walker/Justin Snith	2:45.907
