= 2016–17 Luge World Cup =

International luge competition

Winners
- Men's singles/ sprint: Roman Repilov (RUS)
- Doubles/sprint: (Germany) Toni Eggert (Germany) Sascha Benecken
- Women's singles/sprint: Natalie Geisenberger (GER)
- Team relay: Germany

Competitions
- Venues: 9

The 2016–17 Luge World Cup was a multi race tournament over a season for luge, organised by the FIL.The season started on 26 November 2016 in Winterberg, Germany and ended on 25 February 2017 in Altenberg, Germany.

== Calendar ==
Venue	Date	Details
(Germany) Winterberg	26–27 November	Sprint
(United States) Lake Placid	2–3 December	Team Relay
(Canada) Whistler	9–10 December	
(United States) Park City	16–17 December	Sprint
(Germany) Königssee	5–6 January	Team Relay
(Latvia) Sigulda	14–15 January	Sprint, Team Relay
(Germany) Oberhof	4–5 February	Team Relay
(South Korea) Pyeongchang	18–19 February	Team Relay
(Germany) Altenberg	25–26 February	Team Relay

== Results ==
=== Men's singles ===
Event:	Gold:	Time	Silver:	Time	Bronze:	Time
Winterberg	(Germany) Johannes Ludwig	1:44.732 (52.181 / 52.551)	(Russia) Roman Repilov	1:44.921 (52.343 / 52.578)	(Germany) Andi Langenhan	1:44.977 (52.464 / 52.513)
Winterberg (Sprint)	(Germany) Felix Loch	36.529	(Russia) Stepan Fedorov	36.615	(Germany) Johannes Ludwig	36.651
Lake Placid	(United States) Tucker West	1:43.088 (51.448 / 51.640)	(Russia) Semen Pavlichenko	1:43.094 (51.456 / 51.638)	(Austria) Wolfgang Kindl	1:43.182 (51.603 / 51.579)
Whistler	(United States) Tucker West	50.109	(Austria) Wolfgang Kindl	50.153	(Germany) Andi Langenhan	50.243
Park City	(Russia) Roman Repilov	1:32.254 (46.167 / 46.087)	(Austria) Wolfgang Kindl	1:32.450 (46.283 / 46.167)	(Italy) Dominik Fischnaller	1:32.572 (46.410 / 46.162)
Park City (Sprint)	(Italy) Dominik Fischnaller	28.302	(Russia) Roman Repilov	28.307	(Germany) Andi Langenhan	28.343
Königssee	(Russia) Semen Pavlichenko	1:38.363 (49.245 / 49.118)	(Germany) Ralf Palik	1:38.611 (49.301 / 49.310)	(Austria) Wolfgang Kindl	1:38.823 (49.429 / 49.394)
Sigulda	(Russia) Semen Pavlichenko	1:35.715 (47.837 / 47.878)	(Russia) Roman Repilov	1:35.856 (47.981 / 47.875)	(Austria) Wolfgang Kindl	1:35.967 (48.027 / 47.940)
Sigulda (Sprint)	(Russia) Roman Repilov	27.585	(Russia) Semen Pavlichenko	27.610	(Austria) Wolfgang Kindl	27.642
Oberhof	(Germany) Felix Loch	1:26.130 (43.215 / 42.915)	(Russia) Roman Repilov	1:26.170 (43.277 / 42.893)	(Germany) Andi Langenhan	1:26.257 (43.257 / 43.000)
Pyeongchang	(Italy) Dominik Fischnaller	1:37.229 (48.607 / 48.626)	(Germany) Andi Langenhan	1:37.378 (48.683 / 48.695)	(Canada) Samuel Edney	1:37.694 (48.811 / 48.883)
Altenberg	(Russia) Roman Repilov	1:47.237 (53.785 / 53.452)	(Germany) Felix Loch	1:47.698 (54.049 / 53.649)	(Germany) Johannes Ludwig	1:48.037 (54.229 / 53.808)

=== Women's singles ===
Event:	Gold:	Time	Silver:	Time	Bronze:	Time
Winterberg	(Germany) Natalie Geisenberger	1:50.724 (55.401 / 55.323)	(Germany) Tatjana Hüfner	1:51.132 (55.558 / 55.574)	(Germany) Dajana Eitberger	1:51.389 (55.712 / 55.677)
Winterberg (Sprint)	(Germany) Dajana Eitberger	39.119	(Austria) Birgit Platzer	39.182	(Germany) Natalie Geisenberger	39.201
Lake Placid	(Germany) Tatjana Hüfner	1:28.638 (44.249 / 44.389)	(Canada) Kimberley McRae	1:28.706 (44.445 / 44.261)	(Canada) Alex Gough	1:28.723 (44.448 / 44.275)
Whistler	(Canada) Alex Gough	38.796	(Germany) Natalie Geisenberger	38.848	(Germany) Tatjana Hüfner	38.850
Park City	(United States) Erin Hamlin	1:29.257 (44.649 / 44.608)	(United States) Emily Sweeney	1:29.384 (44.718 / 44.666)	(Canada) Alex Gough	1:29.584 (44.769 / 44.815)
Park City (Sprint)	(United States) Erin Hamlin	32.881	(United States) Emily Sweeney	33.034	(Germany) Tatjana Hüfner	33.040
Königssee	(Germany) Natalie Geisenberger	51.178	(Russia) Tatiana Ivanova	51.329	(Germany) Tatjana Hüfner	51.433
Sigulda	(Germany) Natalie Geisenberger	1:23.485 (41.675 / 41.810)	(Germany) Tatjana Hüfner	1:23.513 (41.760 / 41.753)	(Russia) Tatiana Ivanova	1:23.616 (41.583 / 42.033)
Sigulda (Sprint)	(Russia) Tatiana Ivanova	30.692	(Germany) Natalie Geisenberger	30.904	(Russia) Victoria Demchenko	30.907
Oberhof	(Germany) Natalie Geisenberger	1:22.388 (41.287 / 41.101)	(Germany) Tatjana Hüfner	1:22.389 (41.248 / 41.141)	(Russia) Tatiana Ivanova	1:22.669 (41.386 / 41.283)
Pyeongchang	(Russia) Tatiana Ivanova	1:33.648 (46.856 / 46.792)	(Germany) Natalie Geisenberger	1:33.694 (46.795 / 46.899)	(Germany) Julia Taubitz	1:33.910 (46.825 / 47.085)
Altenberg	(Germany) Natalie Geisenberger	1:44.364 (52.185 / 52.179)	(Germany) Tatjana Hüfner	1:44.435 (52.260 / 52.175)	(Germany) Dajana Eitberger	1:44.550 (52.229 / 52.321)

=== Doubles ===
Event:	Gold:	Time	Silver:	Time	Bronze:	Time
Winterberg	Toni Eggert; Sascha Benecken; Germany	1:25.905 (42.962 / 42.943)	Robin Johannes Geueke; David Gamm; Germany	1:26.287 (43.138 / 43.149)	Tobias Wendl; Tobias Arlt; Germany	1:26.426 (43.066 / 43.360)
Winterberg (Sprint)	Toni Eggert; Sascha Benecken; Germany	31.347	Tobias Wendl; Tobias Arlt; Germany	31.352	Robin Johannes Geueke; David Gamm; Germany	31.402
Lake Placid	Toni Eggert; Sascha Benecken; Germany	1:28.382 (44.050 / 44.332)	Matt Mortensen; Jayson Terdiman; United States	1:28.545 (44.176 / 44.369)	Robin Johannes Geueke; David Gamm; Germany	1:28.726 (44.272 / 44.454)
Whistler	Toni Eggert; Sascha Benecken; Germany	38.542	Tobias Wendl; Tobias Arlt; Germany	38.570	Peter Penz; Georg Fischler; Austria	38.642
Park City	Tobias Wendl; Tobias Arlt; Germany	44.742	Andris Šics; Juris Šics; Latvia	44.816	Toni Eggert; Sascha Benecken; Germany	44.896
Park City (Sprint)	Toni Eggert; Sascha Benecken; Germany	32.838	Tobias Wendl; Tobias Arlt; Germany	32.893	Matt Mortensen; Jayson Terdiman; United States	32.938
Königssee	Tobias Wendl; Tobias Arlt; Germany	1:41.575 (50.838 / 50.737)	Toni Eggert; Sascha Benecken; Germany	1:41.645 (50.813 / 50.832)	Robin Johannes Geueke; David Gamm; Germany	1:42.357 (51.133 / 51.224)
Sigulda	Toni Eggert; Sascha Benecken; Germany	1:23.113 (41.628 / 41.485)	Oskars Gudramovičs; Pēteris Kalniņš; Latvia	1:23.476 (41.767 / 41.709)	Ludwig Rieder; Patrick Rastner; Italy	1:23.808 (41.838 / 41.970)
Sigulda (Sprint)	Toni Eggert; Sascha Benecken; Germany	30.890	Oskars Gudramovičs; Pēteris Kalniņš; Latvia	30.980	Tobias Wendl; Tobias Arlt; Germany	31.006
Oberhof	Tobias Wendl; Tobias Arlt; Germany	1:21.909 (40.910 / 40.999)	Toni Eggert; Sascha Benecken; Germany	1:22.065 (41.049 / 41.016)	Robin Johannes Geueke; David Gamm; Germany	1:22.415 (41.261 / 41.154)
Pyeongchang	Toni Eggert; Sascha Benecken; Germany	1:33.581 (46.859 / 46.722)	Tobias Wendl; Tobias Arlt; Germany	1:33.793 (46.905 / 46.888)	Robin Johannes Geueke; David Gamm; Germany	1:33.831 (46.934 / 46.897)
Altenberg	Toni Eggert; Sascha Benecken; Germany	1:23.768 (41.827 / 41.941)	Matt Mortensen; Jayson Terdiman; United States	1:24.126 (42.086 / 42.040)	Robin Johannes Geueke; David Gamm; Germany	1:24.167 (41.982 / 42.185)

=== Team relay ===
Event:	Gold:	Time	Silver:	Time	Bronze:	Time
Lake Placid	Canada; Kimberley McRae; Samuel Edney; Tristan Walker/Justin Snith	2:34:627 (50.051 / 1:42.105)	Russia; Ekaterina Baturina; Semen Pavlichenko; Andrey Bogdanov/Andrey Medvedev	2:34:671 (50.455 / 1:42.074)	United States; Summer Britcher; Tucker West; Matt Mortensen/Jayson Terdiman	2:34:815 (50.346 / 1:42.430)
Whistler	cancelled, race rescheduled to Sigulda					
Königssee	Germany; Natalie Geisenberger; Ralf Palik; Tobias Wendl/Tobias Arlt	2:42.348 (52.974 / 1:47.502)	United States; Erin Hamlin; Tucker West; Matt Mortensen/Jayson Terdiman	2:43.229 (53.251 / 1:47.710)	Austria; Miriam Kastlunger; Wolfgang Kindl; Thomas Steu/Lorenz Koller	2:43.617 (53.347 / 1:48.206)
Sigulda	Russia; Tatiana Ivanova; Semen Pavlichenko; Vladislav Yuzhakov/Yuri Prokhorov	2:13.178 (43.141 / 1:27.698)	Germany; Natalie Geisenberger; Felix Loch; Toni Eggert/Sascha Benecken	2:13.195 (43.245 / 1:28.063)	Latvia; Elīza Cauce; Inārs Kivlenieks; Oskars Gudramovičs/Pēteris Kalniņš	2:13.596 (43.521 / 1:28.345)
Oberhof	Germany; Natalie Geisenberger; Felix Loch; Tobias Wendl/Tobias Arlt	2:21.465 (45.852 / 1:33.532)	Russia; Tatiana Ivanova; Roman Repilov; Alexander Denisyev/Vladislav Antonov	2:21.695 (45.763 / 1:33.400)	Latvia; Elīza Cauce; Inārs Kivlenieks; Oskars Gudramovičs/Pēteris Kalniņš	2:21.989 (45.998 / 1:33.657)
Pyeongchang	Germany; Natalie Geisenberger; Andi Langenhan; Toni Eggert/Sascha Benecken	2:29.119 (48.273 / 1:38.462)	Austria; Birgit Platzer; Wolfgang Kindl; Peter Penz/Georg Fischler	2:29.550 (48.684 / 1:38.805)	Latvia; Ulla Zirne; Kristers Aparjods; Andris Šics/Juris Šics	2:29.612 (48.990 / 1:39.209)
Altenberg	Germany; Natalie Geisenberger; Felix Loch; Toni Eggert/Sascha Benecken	2:23.021 (46.833 / 1:34.873)	Latvia; Elīza Cauce; Kristers Aparjods; Andris Šics/Juris Šics	2:23.146 (46.480 / 1:34.661)	Russia; Tatiana Ivanova; Roman Repilov; Vladislav Yuzhakov/Yuri Prokhorov	2:23.230 (46.574 / 1:34.479)

== Standings ==
=== Men's singles ===
Pos.	Luger	Points
1.	Roman Repilov (RUS)	845
2.	Felix Loch (GER)*	748
3.	Wolfgang Kindl (AUT)	700
4.	Semen Pavlichenko (RUS)	686
5.	Johannes Ludwig (GER)	557
6.	Dominik Fischnaller (ITA)	556
7.	Tucker West (USA)	535
8.	Stepan Fedorov (RUS)	491
9.	Andi Langenhan (GER)	460
10.	Ralf Palik (GER)	421

- Final standings after 12 events
- (*Champion 2016)

=== Men's singles Sprint ===
Pos.	Luger	Agg. time
1.	Roman Repilov (RUS)	1:32.576
2.	Felix Loch (GER)*	1:32.595
3.	Chris Mazdzer (USA)	1:33.083
4.	Semen Pavlichenko (RUS)	1:33.113
5.	Julian von Schleinitz (GER)	1:33.434
6.	Wolfgang Kindl (AUT)	1:34.164

- Final standings after 3 events
- (*Champion 2016)

Only 6 lugers competed on all events

=== Women's singles ===
Pos.	Luger	Points
1.	Natalie Geisenberger (GER)*	982
2.	Tatjana Hüfner (GER)	865
3.	Tatiana Ivanova (RUS)	683
4.	Erin Hamlin (USA)	614
5.	Alex Gough (CAN)	585
6.	Emily Sweeney (USA)	564
7.	Dajana Eitberger (GER)	553
8.	Kimberley McRae (CAN)	547
9.	Birgit Platzer (AUT)	532
10.	Summer Britcher (USA)	480

- Final standings after 12 events
- (*Champion 2016)

=== Women's singles Sprint ===
Pos.	Luger	Agg. time
1.	Natalie Geisenberger (GER)	1:43.256
2.	Erin Hamlin (USA)	1:43.272
3.	Tatjana Hüfner (GER)	1:43.284
4.	Birgit Platzer (AUT)	1:43.388
5.	Emily Sweeney (USA)	1:43.436
6.	Summer Britcher (USA)	1:43.486
7.	Kimberley McRae (CAN)	1:43.776
8.	Alex Gough (CAN)	1:43.851

- Final standings after 3 events

Only 8 lugers competed on all events

=== Doubles ===
Pos.	Team	Points
1.	Toni Eggert / Sascha Benecken (GER)	1140
2.	Tobias Wendl / Tobias Arlt (GER)*	888
3.	Matt Mortensen / Jayson Terdiman (USA)	674
4.	Robin Johannes Geueke / David Gamm (GER)	671
5.	Andris Šics / Juris Šics (LAT)	532
6.	Christian Oberstolz / Patrick Gruber (ITA)	513
7.	Oskars Gudramovičs / Pēteris Kalniņš (LAT)	483
8.	Thomas Steu / Lorenz Koller (AUT)	479
9.	Andrey Bogdanov / Andrey Medvedev (RUS)	469
10.	Ludwig Rieder / Patrick Rastner (ITA)	441

- Final standings after 12 events
- (*Champion 2016)

=== Doubles Sprint ===
Pos.	Team	Agg. time
1.	Toni Eggert / Sascha Benecken (GER)	1:35.075
2.	Tobias Wendl / Tobias Arlt (GER)*	1:35.251
3.	Matt Mortensen / Jayson Terdiman (USA)	1:35.690
4.	Oskars Gudramovičs / Pēteris Kalniņš (LAT)	1:35.781
5.	Andrey Bogdanov / Andrey Medvedev (RUS)	1:36.133
6.	Thomas Steu / Lorenz Koller (AUT)	1:36.307
7.	Christian Oberstolz / Patrick Gruber (ITA)	1:36.378
8.	Lukáš Brož / Antonín Brož (CZE)	1:36.753
9.	Wojclech Jerzy Chmielewski / Jakub Kowalewski (POL)	1:37.709

- Final standings after 3 events
- (*Champion 2016)

Only 9 double sleds competed on all events

=== Team Relay ===
Pos.	Team	Points
1.	Germany*	531
2.	Latvia	405
3.	Russia	395
4.	Austria	385
5.	Canada	375
6.	United States	371
7.	Italy	288
8.	Poland	214
9.	Ukraine	200
10.	Czech Republic	189

- Final standings after 6 events
- (*Champion 2016)

== Medal table ==
Rank	Nation	Gold	Silver	Bronze	Total
1	Germany	26	18	22	66
2	Russia	8	10	4	22
3	United States	4	5	2	11
4	Canada	2	1	3	6
5	Italy	2	0	2	4
6	Austria	0	4	6	10
7	Latvia	0	4	3	7
Totals (7 entries)		42	42	42	126
