= 2015–16 Luge World Cup =

International luge competition

Winners
- Men's singles: Felix Loch (GER)
- Doubles: (Germany) Tobias Wendl (Germany) Tobias Arlt
- Women's singles: Natalie Geisenberger (GER)
- Team relay: Germany

Competitions
- Venues: 9

The 2015–16 Luge World Cup was a multi race tournament over a season for luge, organised by the FIL. The season started on 28 November 2015 in Igls, Austria and ended on 21 February 2016 in Winterberg, Germany.

== Calendar ==
Venue	Date	Details
(Austria) Innsbruck	28–29 November 2015	
(United States) Lake Placid	4–5 December 2015	
(United States) Park City	11–12 December 2015	no Team relay
(Canada) Calgary	18–19 December 2015	no Team relay
(Latvia) Sigulda	9–10 January 2016	
(Germany) Oberhof	16–17 January 2016	no Team relay
(Russia) Sochi	6–7 February 2016	
(Germany) Altenberg	13–14 February 2016	
(Germany) Winterberg	20–21 February 2016	

== Results ==
=== Men's singles ===
Event:	Gold:	Time	Silver:	Time	Bronze:	Time
Innsbruck	(Italy) Dominik Fischnaller	1:40.687 (50.263 / 50.424)	(Austria) Armin Frauscher	1:40.693 (50.290 / 50.403)	(Austria) Wolfgang Kindl	1:40.719 (50.361 / 50.358)
Lake Placid	(United States) Chris Mazdzer	1:42.808 (51.400 / 51.408)	(United States) Tucker West	1:42.841 (51.425 / 51.416)	(Austria) Wolfgang Kindl	1:42.848 (51.457 / 51.391)
Park City	(United States) Chris Mazdzer	1:30.960 (45.479 / 45.481)	(Austria) Wolfgang Kindl	1:31.056 (45.499 / 45.557)	(Germany) Felix Loch	1:31.087 (45.525 / 45.562)
Park City (Sprint)	(Austria) Wolfgang Kindl	28.033	(Italy) Dominik Fischnaller	28.219	(Germany) Felix Loch	28.232
Calgary	(Germany) Felix Loch	1:30.304 (45.064 / 45.240)	(United States) Chris Mazdzer	1:30.628 (45.172 / 45.456)	(Austria) Wolfgang Kindl	1:30.673 (45.175 / 45.498)
Calgary (Sprint)	(Germany) Felix Loch	30.091	(Russia) Roman Repilov	30.279	(Austria) Wolfgang Kindl	30.329
Sigulda	(Germany) Felix Loch	1:36.316 (48.136 / 48.180)	(Russia) Semen Pavlichenko	1:36.531 (48.392 / 48.139)	(United States) Tucker West	1:36.775 (48.440 / 48.335)
Oberhof	(Germany) Felix Loch	1:26.068 (43.029 / 43.039)	(Germany) Andi Langenhan	1:26.453 (43.175 / 43.278)	(Germany) Ralf Palik	1:26.547 (43.191 / 43.356)
Oberhof (Sprint)	(Germany) Felix Loch	33.416	(Germany) Andi Langenhan	33.624	(Germany) Ralf Palik	33.668
Sochi	(Germany) Felix Loch	1:43.967 (51.950 / 52.017)	(Austria) Wolfgang Kindl	1:44.399 (52.191 / 52.208)	(Italy) Dominik Fischnaller	1:44.431 (52.112 / 52.319)
Altenberg	(Germany) Felix Loch	1:47.556 (53.780 / 53.776)	(Russia) Roman Repilov	1:47.885 (53.994 / 53.891)	(United States) Chris Mazdzer	1:47.902 (53.934 / 53.968)
Winterberg	(Russia) Stepan Fedorov	1:47.210 (53.977 / 53.233)	(United States) Chris Mazdzer	1:47.245 (54.024 / 53.221)	(Italy) Dominik Fischnaller	1:47.276 (53.878 / 53.398)

=== Women's singles ===
Event:	Gold:	Time	Silver:	Time	Bronze:	Time
Innsbruck	(Germany) Dajana Eitberger	1:19.795 (39.827 / 39.968)	(Germany) Natalie Geisenberger	1:20.009 (40.003 / 40.006)	(Canada) Alex Gough	1:20.017 (40.015 / 40.002)
Lake Placid	(United States) Erin Hamlin	1:27.961 (43.912 / 44.049)	(United States) Emily Sweeney	1:28.136 (44.033 / 44.103)	(United States) Summer Britcher	1:28.221 (44.148 / 44.073)
Park City	(United States) Summer Britcher	1:27.537 (43.825 / 43.712)	(United States) Erin Hamlin	1:27.614 (43.860 / 43.754)	(Germany) Dajana Eitberger	1:27.770 (43.872 / 43.898)
Park City (Sprint)	(United States) Summer Britcher	32.477	(United States) Erin Hamlin	32.514	(Germany) Dajana Eitberger	32.576
Calgary	(Germany) Natalie Geisenberger	1:33.569 (46.818 / 46.751)	(United States) Erin Hamlin	1:33.581 (46.814 / 46.767)	(United States) Summer Britcher	1:33.712 (46.949 / 46.763)
Calgary (Sprint)	(United States) Summer Britcher	31.129	(Germany) Dajana Eitberger	31.132	(Russia) Tatiana Ivanova	31.186
Sigulda	(Russia) Tatiana Ivanova	1:23.634 (41.840 / 41.794)	(Germany) Tatjana Hüfner	1:23.731 (41.841 / 41.890)	(Germany) Natalie Geisenberger	1:23.766 (41.881 / 41.885)
Oberhof	(Germany) Tatjana Hüfner	1:23.006 (41.355 / 41.651)	(Germany) Natalie Geisenberger	1:23.048 (41.414 / 41.634)	(Germany) Dajana Eitberger	1:23.139 (41.386 / 41.753)
Oberhof (Sprint)	(Germany) Natalie Geisenberger	26.250	(Germany) Dajana Eitberger	26.308	(Germany) Tatjana Hüfner	26.374
Sochi	(Russia) Tatiana Ivanova	1:41.023 (50.534 / 50.489)	(Russia) Victoria Demchenko	1:41.152 (50.684 / 50.468)	(Germany) Natalie Geisenberger	1:41.213 (50.679 / 50.534)
Altenberg	(Germany) Tatjana Hüfner	1:46.379 (53.359 / 53.020)	(Latvia) Elīza Cauce	1:46.590 (53.283 / 53.307)	(Russia) Tatiana Ivanova	1:46.692 (53.339 / 53.353)
Winterberg	(Germany) Tatjana Hüfner	1:53.009 (56.734 / 56.275)	(Germany) Natalie Geisenberger	1:53.138 (56.963 / 56.175)	(Russia) Tatiana Ivanova	1:53.368 (57.091 / 56.277)

=== Doubles ===
Event:	Gold:	Time	Silver:	Time	Bronze:	Time
Innsbruck	Toni Eggert; Sascha Benecken; Germany	1:19.381 (39.689 / 39.692)	Peter Penz; Georg Fischler; Austria	1:19.492 (39.769 / 39.723)	Tobias Wendl; Tobias Arlt; Germany	1:19.836 (39.754 / 40.082)
Lake Placid	Toni Eggert; Sascha Benecken; Germany	1:27.583 (43.781 / 43.802)	Peter Penz; Georg Fischler; Austria	1:27.965 (43.954 / 44.011)	Andris Šics; Juris Šics; Latvia	1:28.107 (43.976 / 44.131)
Park City	Tobias Wendl; Tobias Arlt; Germany	1:27.092 (43.650 / 43.442)	Toni Eggert; Sascha Benecken; Germany	1:27.567 (43.858/ 43.709)	Peter Penz; Georg Fischler; Austria	1:27.679 (43.846 / 43.833)
Park City (Sprint)	Christian Oberstolz; Patrick Gruber; Italy	32.521	Tobias Wendl; Tobias Arlt; Germany	32.537	Toni Eggert; Sascha Benecken; Germany	32.564
Calgary	Toni Eggert; Sascha Benecken; Germany	1:28.223 (44.098 / 44.125)	Peter Penz; Georg Fischler; Austria	1:28.327 (44.193 / 44.134)	Tobias Wendl; Tobias Arlt; Germany	1:28.580 (44.522 / 44.058)
Calgary (Sprint)	Tobias Wendl; Tobias Arlt; Germany	36.310	Peter Penz; Georg Fischler; Austria; Toni Eggert; Sascha Benecken; Germany	36.316		
Sigulda	Tobias Wendl; Tobias Arlt; Germany	1:23.642 (41.778 / 41.864)	Oskars Gudramovičs; Pēteris Kalniņš; Latvia	1:23.980 (41.965 / 42.015)	Peter Penz; Georg Fischler; Austria	1:24.013 (42.009 / 42.004)
Oberhof	Tobias Wendl; Tobias Arlt; Germany	1:21.713 (40.693 / 41.020)	Toni Eggert; Sascha Benecken; Germany	1:22.322 (41.052 / 41.270)	Peter Penz; Georg Fischler; Austria	1:22.450 (41.157 / 41.293)
Oberhof (Sprint)	Tobias Wendl; Tobias Arlt; Germany	26.166	Toni Eggert; Sascha Benecken; Germany	26.440	Andris Šics; Juris Šics; Latvia	26.470
Sochi	Tobias Wendl; Tobias Arlt; Germany	1:40.368 (50.376 / 49.992)	Andrey Bogdanov; Andrey Medvedev; Russia	1:40.889 (50.439 / 50.450)	Christian Oberstolz; Patrick Gruber; Italy	1:40.992 (50.327 / 50.665)
Altenberg	Toni Eggert; Sascha Benecken; Germany	1:22.890 (41.502 / 41.388)	Tobias Wendl; Tobias Arlt; Germany	1:23.269 (41.684 / 41.585)	Peter Penz; Georg Fischler; Austria	1:23.471 (41.712 / 41.759)
Winterberg	Toni Eggert; Sascha Benecken; Germany	1:26.473 (43.158 / 43.315)	Tobias Wendl; Tobias Arlt; Germany	1:26.863 (43.507 / 43.356)	Oskars Gudramovičs; Pēteris Kalniņš; Latvia	1:27.055 (43.552 / 43.503)

=== Team Relay ===
Event:	Gold:	Time	Silver:	Time	Bronze:	Time
Innsbruck	Dajana Eitberger; Andi Langenhan; Toni Eggert; Sascha Benecken; Germany	2:09:035 (41.506 / 1:25.207)	Elīza Cauce; Artūrs Dārznieks; Andris Šics; Juris Šics; Latvia	2:09:428 (41.691 / 1:25.543)	Sandra Robatscher; Dominik Fischnaller; Ludwig Rieder; Patrick Rastner; Italy	2:09:799 (41.891 / 1:25.673)
Lake Placid	Erin Hamlin; Chris Mazdzer; Justin Krewson; Andrew Sherk; United States	2:32.767 (49.464 / 1:40.504)	Elīza Cauce; Inars Kivlenieks; Andris Šics; Juris Šics; Latvia	2:33.638 (50.026 / 1:41.679)	Tatiana Ivanova; Semen Pavlichenko; Andrey Bogdanov; Andrey Medvedev; Russia	2:33.695 (49.885 / 1:41.281)
Sigulda	Tatjana Hüfner; Felix Loch; Tobias Wendl; Tobias Arlt; Germany	2:14.386 (43.620 / 1:28.880)	Elīza Cauce; Artūrs Dārznieks; Oskars Gudramovičs; Pēteris Kalniņš; Latvia	2:14.602 (43.823 / 1:29.089)	Tatiana Ivanova; Semen Pavlichenko; Andrey Bogdanov; Andrey Medvedev; Russia	2:14.757 (43.275 / 1:28.269)
Sochi	Tatiana Ivanova; Semen Pavlichenko; Andrey Bogdanov; Andrey Medvedev; Russia	2:50.392 (55.313 / 1:52.397)	Natalie Geisenberger; Felix Loch; Tobias Wendl; Tobias Arlt; Germany	2:50.397 (55.921 / 1:53.060)	Miriam Kastlunger; Wolfgang Kindl; Peter Penz; Georg Fischler; Austria	2:51.775 (56.195 / 1:53.623)
Altenberg	Tatjana Hüfner; Felix Loch; Toni Eggert; Sascha Benecken; Germany	2:24.204 (47.157 / 1:35.508)	Kimberley McRae; Mitchel Malyk; Tristan Walker; Justin Snith; Canada	2:24.550 (47.229 / 1:35.789)	Elīza Cauce; Artūrs Dārznieks; Andris Šics; Juris Šics; Latvia	2:24.982 (47.105 / 1:36.148)
Winterberg	Arianne Jones; Mitchel Malyk; Tristan Walker; Justin Snith; Canada	2:26.595 (47.956 / 1:37.359)	Tatiana Ivanova; Stepan Fedorov; Alexander Denisyev; Vladislav Antonov; Russia	2:27.127 (48.003 / 1:37.440)	Miriam Kastlunger; Wolfgang Kindl; Thomas Steu; Lorenz Koller; Austria	2:27.237 (48.243 / 1:37.392)

== Standings ==
=== Men's singles ===
Pos.	Luger	Points
1.	Felix Loch (GER)*	940
2.	Wolfgang Kindl (AUT)	795
3.	Chris Mazdzer (USA)	700
4.	Ralf Palik (GER)	628
5.	Andi Langenhan (GER)	617
6.	Dominik Fischnaller (ITA)	590
7.	Tucker West (USA)	524
8.	Johannes Ludwig (GER)	481
9.	Roman Repilov (RUS)	395
10.	Semen Pavlichenko (RUS)	377

- (*Champion 2015)

=== Men's singles Sprint ===
Pos.	Luger	Agg. time
1.	Felix Loch (GER)	1:31.739
2.	Wolfgang Kindl (AUT)	1:32.165
3.	Johannes Ludwig (GER)	1:32.532
4.	Andi Langenhan (GER)	1:32.647
5.	Dominik Fischnaller (ITA)	1:32.714
6.	Ralf Palik (GER)	1:32.723
7.	Tucker West (USA)	1:32.790
8.	Chris Mazdzer (USA)	1:33.122

=== Women's singles ===
Pos.	Luger	Points
1.	Natalie Geisenberger (GER)*	895
2.	Tatiana Ivanova (RUS)	771
3.	Tatjana Hüfner (GER)	769
4.	Erin Hamlin (USA)	747
5.	Summer Britcher (USA)	726
6.	Dajana Eitberger (GER)	712
7.	Elīza Cauce (LAT)	583
8.	Emily Sweeney (USA)	537
9.	Victoria Demchenko (RUS)	425
10.	Kimberley McRae (CAN)	391

- (*Champion 2015)

=== Women's singles Sprint ===
Pos.	Luger	Agg. time
1.	Dajana Eitberger (GER)	1:30.016
2.	Natalie Geisenberger (GER)	1:30.061
3.	Summer Britcher (USA)	1:30.132
4.	Tatiana Ivanova (RUS)	1:30.279
5.	Tatjana Hüfner (GER)	1:30.344
6.	Emily Sweeney (USA)	1:30.543
7.	Elīza Cauce (LAT)	1:30.692
8.	Erin Hamlin (USA)	1:30.727
9.	Victoria Demchenko (RUS)	1:30.784
10.	Kimberley McRae (CAN)	1:30.834

=== Doubles ===
Pos.	Luger	Points
1.	(Germany) Tobias Wendl (Germany) Tobias Arlt	1037
2.	(Germany) Toni Eggert (Germany) Sascha Benecken*	962
3.	(Austria) Peter Penz (Austria) Georg Fischler	785
4.	(Italy) Christian Oberstolz (Italy) Patrick Gruber	668
5.	(United States) Matthew Mortensen (United States) Jayson Terdiman	532
6.	(Latvia) Andris Šics (Latvia) Juris Šics	530
7.	(Italy) Emanuel Rieder (Italy) Patrick Rastner	486
8.	(Russia) Andrei Bogdanov (Russia) Andrei Medvedev	482
9.	(Germany) Robin Johannes Geueke (Germany) David Gamm	481
10.	(Canada) Tristan Walker (Canada) Justin Snith	449

- (*champion 2015)

=== Doubles Sprint ===
Pos.	Luger	Agg. time
1.	(Germany) Tobias Wendl (Germany) Tobias Arlt	1:35.013
2.	(Germany) Toni Eggert (Germany) Sascha Benecken	1:35.320
3.	(Austria) Peter Penz (Austria) Georg Fischler	1:35.378
4.	(Italy) Christian Oberstolz (Italy) Patrick Gruber	1:35.658
5.	(United States) Matthew Mortensen (United States) Jayson Terdiman	1:35.780
6.	(Russia) Alexander Denisyev (Russia) Vladislav Antonov	1:36.186
7.	(Austria) Thomas Steu (Austria) Lorenz Koller	1:36.197
8.	(Canada) Tristan Walker (Canada) Justin Snith	1:36.222
9.	(Italy) Ludwig Rieder (Italy) Patrick Rastner	1:36.325
10.	(Germany) Robin Johannes Geueke (Germany) David Gamm	1:36.448

=== Team Relay ===
Pos.	Luger	Points
1.	Germany*	491
2.	Russia	385
3.	United States	375
4.	Canada	355
5.	Latvia	325
6.	Italy	322
7.	Austria	286
8.	Poland	227
9.	Romania	216
10.	Czech Republic	156

- (*champion 2015)
