= Oleksandr Obolonchyk =

Ukrainian luger (born 1992)

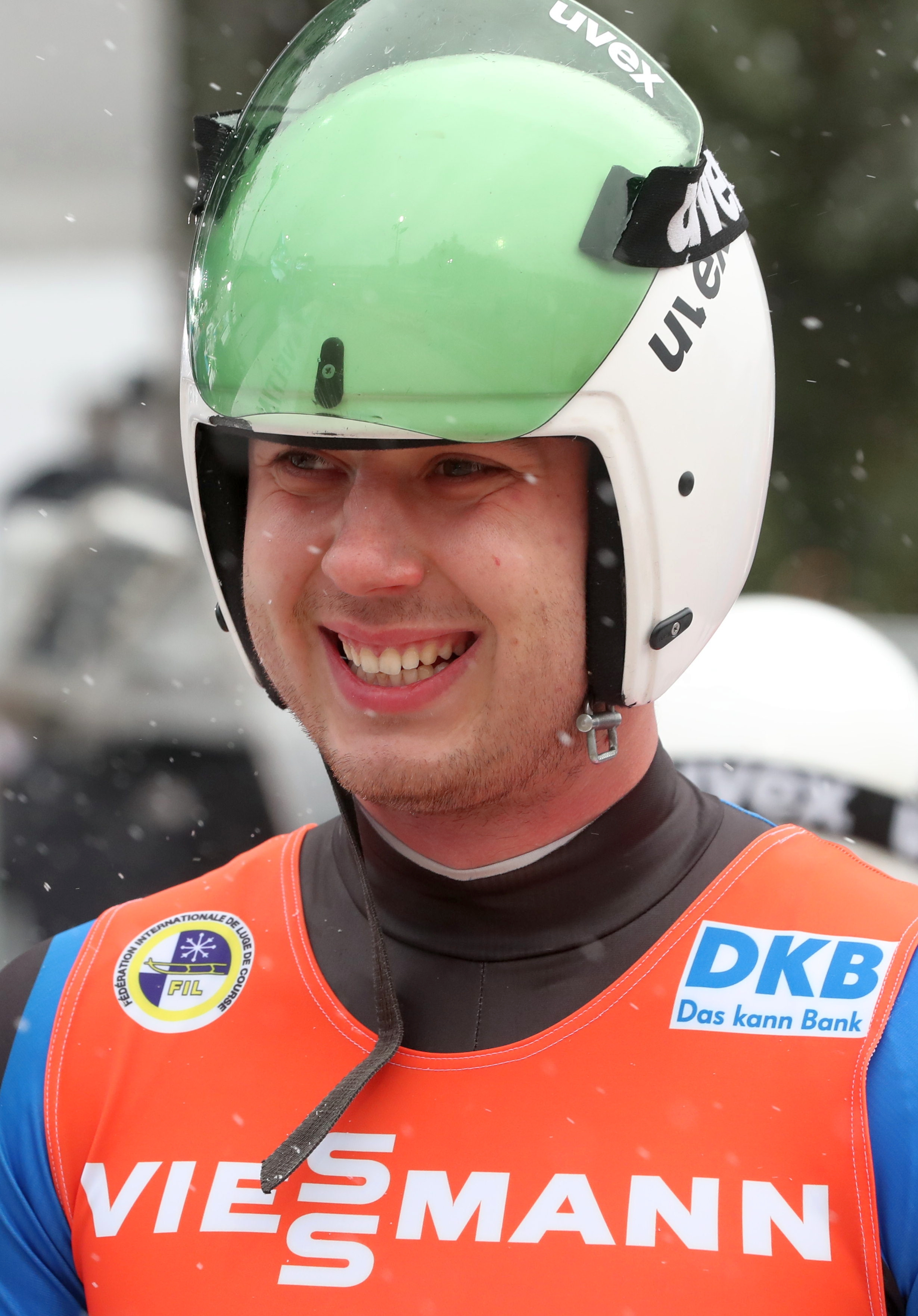
- Obolonchyk in 2017

Personal information
- Nationality: Ukrainian
- Born: 17 January 1992 (age 34) Kremenets, Ukraine
- Height: 1.92 m (6 ft 4 in)
- Weight: 83 kg (183 lb)

Sport
- Country: Ukraine
- Sport: Luge
- Event: Doubles

Oleksandr Volodymyrovych Obolonchyk (Ukrainian: Олександр Володимирович Оболончик, born 17 January 1992 in Kremenets) is a Ukrainian luger. He participated at the 2014 and 2018 Winter Olympics.

== Career ==
Obolonczyk started his international career in 2009 competing in singles. He debuted finishing 60th in Igls, Austria, which was his single race in World Cup that year.

In season 2010-11, he participated in 6 out of 9 races and achieved his personal best — 27th in Königssee. Two more seasons he competed in singles but later he switched to doubles. Roman Zakharkiv is since then his partner.

Obolonchyk competed at the 2014 Winter Olympics for Ukraine. In the doubles he competed with Roman Zakharkiv, finishing 17th. He was also a part of the Ukrainian relay team, which finished 11th.

He also participated in doubles and relay competitions at three World Championships without any great success.

As of January 2018, his best finish is 13th place in Sigulda, Latvia, in 2016-17 season.

On December 27, 2017, Obolonchyk qualified for 2018 Winter Olympics. At that Games he competed together with Roman Zakharkiv and finished 20th in doubles competition and 13th in team relay.

== Personal life ==
Obolonchyk graduated from Lviv State University of Physical Culture. Now, he studies at Ternopil State Economics University. His hobbies are computers and music.

== Career results ==
=== Winter Olympics ===
Year	Event	Doubles	Relay
2014	Sochi, Russia	17	11
2018	Pyeongchang, South Korea	20	13

=== World Championships ===
Year	Event	Doubles	Relay	Doubles Sprint
2015	Sigulda, Latvia	19	10	
2016	Königssee, Germany	DNF	13	21
2017	Innsbruck, Austria	16	13	25

=== European Championships ===
Year	Event	Singles	Doubles	Relay
2013	Oberhof, Germany	30		
2014	Sigulda, Latvia			7
2015	Sochi, Russia		14	5
2016	Altenberg, Germany		18	
2017	Königssee, Germany		17	8
2018	Sigulda, Latvia		18	7

=== Luge World Cup ===
==== Rankings ====
Season	Singles	Doubles	Doubles Sprint
2009–10	65		
2010–11	45		
2011–12	52		
2012–13	43		
2013–14		24	
2014–15		21	
2015–16		23	
2016–17		20	19
2017–18		23	
