= 2017–18 Luge World Cup =

International luge competition

Winners
- Men's singles Men's sprint: (Germany) Felix Loch (Austria) Wolfgang Kindl
- Doubles: (Germany) Toni Eggert / Sascha Benecken
- Doubles' sprint: (Latvia) Andris Šics / Juris Šics
- Women's singles: (Germany) Natalie Geisenberger
- Women's sprint: (Germany) Natalie Geisenberger
- Team relay: Germany

Competitions
- Venues: 9

The 2017–18 Luge World Cup was a multi race tournament over a season for Luge, organised by the FIL. The season started on 18 November 2017 in Innsbruck, Austria, and ended on 27 January 2018 in Sigulda, Latvia.

== Calendar ==
Venue	Date	Details
(Austria) Innsbruck	18–19 November	Team Relay
(Germany) Winterberg	25–26 November	Sprint
(Germany) Altenberg	2–3 December	Team Relay
(Canada) Calgary	8–9 December	Team Relay
(United States) Lake Placid	15–16 December	Sprint
(Germany) Königssee	6–7 January	Team Relay
(Germany) Oberhof	13–14 January	Team Relay
(Norway) Lillehammer	20–21 January	Sprint
(Latvia) Sigulda	27–28 January	Sprint, Team Relay

== Results ==
=== Men's singles ===
Event:	Gold:	Time	Silver:	Time	Bronze:	Time
Innsbruck	(Russia) Semen Pavlichenko	1:41.771 (50.949 / 50.822)	(Austria) Wolfgang Kindl	1:41.827 (50.953 / 50.874)	(Germany) Felix Loch	1:41.841 (50.979 / 50.862)
Winterberg	(Italy) Kevin Fischnaller	1:45.528 (52.428 / 53.100)	(Germany) Felix Loch	1:45.595 (52.806 / 52.789)	(Russia) Stepan Fedorov	1:45.645 (52.746 / 52.899)
Winterberg (Sprint)	(Germany) Felix Loch	36.644	(Russia) Semen Pavlichenko	36.762	(Austria) Nico Gleirscher	36.790
Altenberg	(Germany) Felix Loch	1:48.116 (54.016 / 54.100)	(Russia) Roman Repilov	1:48.242 (54.157 / 54.085)	(Germany) Andi Langenhan	1:48.398 (54.227 / 54.171)
Calgary	(Germany) Felix Loch	1:28.752 (44.274 / 44.478)	(Canada) Samuel Edney	1:29.138 (44.523 / 44.615)	(Russia) Roman Repilov	1:29.205 (44.478 / 44.727)
Lake Placid	(Russia) Roman Repilov	1:41.874 (50.999 / 50.875)	(Russia) Semen Pavlichenko	1:41.938 (50.941 / 50.997)	(United States) Tucker West	1:42.132 (50.904 / 51.228)
Lake Placid (Sprint)	(Austria) Wolfgang Kindl	32.441	(Germany) Johannes Ludwig	32.655	(United States) Taylor Cloy Morris	32.665
Königssee	(Austria) Wolfgang Kindl	1:39.035 (49.440 / 49.595)	(Austria) Armin Frauscher	1:39.064 (49.458 / 49.606)	(Germany) Johannes Ludwig	1:39.154 (49.515 / 49.639)
Oberhof	(Germany) Felix Loch	1:25.591 (42.714 / 42.877)	(Russia) Semen Pavlichenko	1:25.858 (42.944 / 42.914)	(Germany) Andi Langenhan	1:25.886 (42.922 / 42.964)
Lillehammer	(Italy) Dominik Fischnaller	1:38.590 (49.204 / 49.386)	(Russia) Roman Repilov	1:38.686 (49.419 / 49.267)	(Austria) Wolfgang Kindl	1:38.722 (49.282 / 49.440)
Lillehammer (Sprint)	(Russia) Semen Pavlichenko	31.943	(Austria) Wolfgang Kindl	32.020	(Italy) Dominik Fischnaller	32.042
Sigulda	(Russia) Semen Pavlichenko	1:36.758 (48.271 / 48.487)	(Germany) Felix Loch	1:36.769 (48.405 / 48.364)	(Russia) Roman Repilov	1:36.870 (48.410 / 48.460)
Sigulda (Sprint)	(Russia) Roman Repilov	27.839	(Slovakia) Jozef Ninis	27.911	(Germany) Felix Loch	27.977

=== Women's singles ===
Event:	Gold:	Time	Silver:	Time	Bronze:	Time
Innsbruck	(Germany) Natalie Geisenberger	1:20.488 (40.277 / 40.211)	(Germany) Dajana Eitberger	1:20.661 (40.439 / 40.222)	(Germany) Tatjana Hüfner	1:20.664 (40.474 / 40.190)
Winterberg	(Germany) Natalie Geisenberger	1:53.484 (56.979 / 56.505)	(Germany) Tatjana Hüfner	1:53.832 (57.190 / 56.642)	(United States) Summer Britcher	1:53.893 (57.147 / 56.746)
Winterberg (Sprint)	(United States) Emily Sweeney	39.598	(United States) Summer Britcher	39.642	(Germany) Natalie Geisenberger	39.678
Altenberg	(Germany) Natalie Geisenberger	1:44.241 (52.205 / 52.036)	(Germany) Tatjana Hüfner	1:44.398 (52.207 / 52.191)	(Germany) Dajana Eitberger	1:44.733 (52.348 / 52.385)
Calgary	(Germany) Tatjana Hüfner	1:33.442 (46.731 / 46.711)	(Canada) Alex Gough	1:33.557 (46.769 / 46.788)	(Germany) Natalie Geisenberger	1:33.603 (46.728 / 46.875)
Lake Placid	(Germany) Natalie Geisenberger	1:28.211 (44.064 / 44.147)	(Canada) Alex Gough	1:28.315 (44.138 / 44.177)	(Canada) Kimberley McRae	1:28.352 (44.232 / 44.120)
Lake Placid (Sprint)	(Germany) Dajana Eitberger	37.780	(Canada) Alex Gough	37.823	(Germany) Natalie Geisenberger	37.829
Königssee	(Germany) Natalie Geisenberger	1:41.397 (50.729 / 50.668)	(Germany) Dajana Eitberger	1:41.500 (50.786 / 50.714)	(Germany) Jessica Tiebel	1:41.707 (50.961 / 50.746)
Oberhof	(Germany) Dajana Eitberger	1:22.213 (41.127 / 41.086)	(Germany) Natalie Geisenberger	1:22.260 (41.186 / 41.074)	(Germany) Tatjana Hüfner	1:22.546 (41.303 / 41.243)
Lillehammer	(United States) Summer Britcher	1:35.266 (47.672 / 47.594)	(Germany) Natalie Geisenberger	1:35.299 (47.666 / 47.633)	(Germany) Julia Taubitz	1:35.529 (47.726 / 47.803)
Lillehammer (Sprint)	(United States) Summer Britcher	29.925	(Russia) Victoria Demchenko	29.927	(Germany) Natalie Geisenberger	29.948
Sigulda	(Russia) Tatiana Ivanova	1:23.989 (42.047 / 41.942)	(Germany) Natalie Geisenberger	1:24.076 (42.064 / 42.012)	(Italy) Sandra Robatscher	1:24.360 (42.172 / 42.188)
Sigulda (Sprint)	(Russia) Tatiana Ivanova	30.998	(Germany) Natalie Geisenberger	31.003	(Latvia) Kendija Aparjode	31.111

=== Doubles ===
Event:	Gold:	Time	Silver:	Time	Bronze:	Time
Innsbruck	Toni Eggert; Sascha Benecken; Germany	1:19.843 (39.934 / 39.909)	Ludwig Rieder; Patrick Rastner; Italy	1:20.021 (39.967 / 40.054)	Tobias Wendl; Tobias Arlt; Germany	1:20.258 (40.015 / 40.243)
Winterberg	Toni Eggert; Sascha Benecken; Germany	1:27.340 (43.609 / 43.731)	Tobias Wendl; Tobias Arlt; Germany	1:27.577 (43.830 / 43.747)	Robin Johannes Geueke; David Gamm; Germany	1:27.769 (43.866 / 43.903)
Winterberg (Sprint)	Tobias Wendl; Tobias Arlt; Germany	31.622	Toni Eggert; Sascha Benecken; Germany	31.649	Robin Johannes Geueke; David Gamm; Germany	31.667
Altenberg	Toni Eggert; Sascha Benecken; Germany	1:23.539 (41.730 / 41.809)	Peter Penz; Georg Fischler; Austria	1:23.808 (41.817 / 41.991)	Robin Johannes Geueke; David Gamm; Germany	1:23.991 (42.047 / 41.944)
Calgary	Toni Eggert; Sascha Benecken; Germany	1:26.875 (43.421 / 43.454)	Peter Penz; Georg Fischler; Austria	1:27.018 (43.466 / 43.552)	Tobias Wendl; Tobias Arlt; Germany	1:27.111 (43.581 / 43.530)
Lake Placid	Toni Eggert; Sascha Benecken; Germany	1:26.806 (43.372 / 43.434)	Peter Penz; Georg Fischler; Austria	1:27.440 (43.794 / 43.646)	Tristan Walker; Justin Snith; Canada	1:27.683 (43.810 / 43.873)
Lake Placid (Sprint)	Toni Eggert; Sascha Benecken; Germany	37.533	Peter Penz; Georg Fischler; Austria	37.787	Andris Šics; Juris Šics; Latvia	37.838
Königssee	Tobias Wendl; Tobias Arlt; Germany	1:39.961 (49.935 / 50.026)	Toni Eggert; Sascha Benecken; Germany	1:40.095 (50.081 / 50.014)	Robin Johannes Geueke; David Gamm; Germany	1:40.431 (50.140 / 50.291)
Oberhof	Toni Eggert; Sascha Benecken; Germany	1:21.535 (40.774 / 40.761)	Tobias Wendl; Tobias Arlt; Germany	1:21.542 (40.719 / 40.823)	Peter Penz; Georg Fischler; Austria	1:22.033 (41.041 / 40.992)
Lillehammer	Toni Eggert; Sascha Benecken; Germany	1:34.586 (47.283 / 47.303)	Peter Penz; Georg Fischler; Austria	1:34.716 (47.374 / 47.342)	Tobias Wendl; Tobias Arlt; Germany	1:35.101 (47.487 / 47.614)
Lillehammer (Sprint)	Peter Penz; Georg Fischler; Austria	29.910	Tobias Wendl; Tobias Arlt; Germany	29.970	Matthew Mortensen; Jayson Terdiman; United States	30.050
Sigulda	Toni Eggert; Sascha Benecken; Germany	1:23.364 (41.660 / 41.704)	Andris Šics; Juris Šics; Latvia	1:23.419 (41.716 / 41.703)	Tobias Wendl; Tobias Arlt; Germany	1:23.590 (41.740 / 41.850)
Sigulda (Sprint)	Toni Eggert; Sascha Benecken; Germany	30.886	Andris Šics; Juris Šics; Latvia	30.973	Oskars Gudramovičs; Pēteris Kalniņš; Latvia	31.080

=== Team relay ===
Event:	Gold:	Time	Silver:	Time	Bronze:	Time
Innsbruck	Germany; Natalie Geisenberger; Felix Loch; Toni Eggert/Sascha Benecken	2:10.667 (41.978 / 1:26.235)	Canada; Alex Gough; Mitchel Malyk; Tristan Walker/Justin Snith	2:11.025 (42.001 / 1:26.406)	Russia; Ekaterina Baturina; Semen Pavlichenko; Alexander Denisyev/Vladislav Antonov	2:11.044 (42.327 / 1:26.409)
Altenberg	Germany; Natalie Geisenberger; Felix Loch; Toni Eggert/Sascha Benecken	2:22.644 (46.625 / 1:34.602)	Austria; Miriam Kastlunger; Wolfgang Kindl; Peter Penz/Georg Fischler	2:22.957 (46.868 / 1:34.845)	Italy; Sandra Robatscher; Emanuel Rieder; Ivan Nagler/Fabian Malleier	2:23.115 (46.653 / 1:34.587)
Calgary	Germany; Tatjana Hüfner; Felix Loch; Toni Eggert/Sascha Benecken	2:21.146 (45.882 / 1:33.250)	Canada; Alex Gough; Samuel Edney; Tristan Walker/Justin Snith	2:21.187 (45.889 / 1:33.397)	Austria; Miriam Kastlunger; Wolfgang Kindl; Peter Penz/Georg Fischler	2:21.589 (46.326 / 1:33.925)
Königssee	Italy; Andrea Vötter; Dominik Fischnaller; Ivan Nagler/Fabian Malleier	2:43.233 (53.315 / 1:47.870)	United States; Summer Britcher; Tucker West; Matt Mortensen/Jayson Terdiman	2:43.434 (53.170 / 1:47.891)	Austria; Birgit Platzer; Wolfgang Kindl; Peter Penz/Georg Fischler	2:43.595 (53.581 / 1:48.555)
Oberhof	Germany; Dajana Eitberger; Felix Loch; Toni Eggert/Sascha Benecken	2:20.952 (45.448 / 1:33.146)	Latvia; Elīza Cauce; Artūrs Dārznieks; Andris Šics/Juris Šics	2:21.656 (45.869 / 1:33.671)	Austria; Hannah Prock; Reinhard Egger; Peter Penz/Georg Fischler	2:21.709 (45.970 / 1:33.664)
Sigulda	Russia; Tatiana Ivanova; Semen Pavlichenko; Alexander Denisyev/Vladislav Antonov	2:13.428 (43.358 / 1:28.041)	Germany; Natalie Geisenberger; Felix Loch; Toni Eggert/Sascha Benecken	2:13.579 (43.318 / 1:28.470)	Latvia; Kendija Aparjode; Inārs Kivlenieks; Andris Šics/Juris Šics	2:13.607 (43.597 / 1:28.507)

== Standings ==
=== Men's singles ===
Pos.	Luger	Points
1.	Felix Loch (GER)	923
2.	Wolfgang Kindl (AUT)	838
3.	Roman Repilov (RUS)*	774
4.	Semen Pavlichenko (RUS)	773
5.	Johannes Ludwig (GER)	655
6.	Andi Langenhan (GER)	480
7.	Dominik Fischnaller (ITA)	477
8.	Ralf Palik (GER)	469
9.	Kevin Fischnaller (ITA)	466
10.	Tucker West (USA)	453

- Final standings after 13 events
- (*Champion 2017)

=== Men's singles Sprint ===
Pos.	Luger	Agg. time
1.	Wolfgang Kindl (AUT)	2:09.308
2.	Felix Loch (GER)	2:09.829
2.	Johannes Ludwig (GER)	2:09.829
4.	Kevin Fischnaller (ITA)	2:10.187
5.	Stepan Fedorov (RUS)	2:10.385
6.	Semen Pavlichenko (RUS)	2:10.525
7.	Tucker West (USA)	2:11.345

- Final standings after 4 events

Only 7 lugers competed on all events

=== Women's singles ===
Pos.	Luger	Points
1.	Natalie Geisenberger (GER)*	1120
2.	Dajana Eitberger (GER)	754
3.	Summer Britcher (USA)	726
4.	Alex Gough (CAN)	697
5.	Tatjana Hüfner (GER)	695
6.	Tatiana Ivanova (RUS)	635
7.	Erin Hamlin (USA)	539
8.	Julia Taubitz (GER)	473
9.	Sandra Robatscher (ITA)	464
10.	Kimberley McRae (CAN)	451

- Final standings after 13 events
- (*Champion 2017)

=== Women's singles Sprint ===
Pos.	Luger	Agg. time
1.	Natalie Geisenberger (GER)*	2:18.458
2.	Summer Britcher (USA)	2:18.801
3.	Tatiana Ivanova (RUS)	2:19.003
4.	Alex Gough (CAN)	2:19.107
5.	Sandra Robatscher (ITA)	2:20.320
6.	Erin Hamlin (USA)	2:20.615

- Final standings after 4 events
- (*Champion 2017)

Only 6 lugers competed on all events

=== Doubles ===
Pos.	Team	Points
1.	Toni Eggert / Sascha Benecken (GER)*	1170
2.	Tobias Wendl / Tobias Arlt (GER)	911
3.	Peter Penz / Georg Fischler (AUT)	836
4.	Andris Šics / Juris Šics (LAT)	719
5.	Matt Mortensen / Jayson Terdiman (USA)	588
6.	Robin Johannes Geueke / David Gamm (GER)	524
7.	Ludwig Rieder / Patrick Rastner (ITA)	523
8.	Alexander Denisyev / Vladislav Antonov (RUS)	507
9.	Tristan Walker / Justin Snith (CAN)	504
10.	Oskars Gudramovičs / Pēteris Kalniņš (LAT)	456

- Final standings after 13 events
- (*Champion 2017)

=== Doubles Sprint ===
Pos.	Team	Agg. time
1.	Andris Šics / Juris Šics (LAT)	2:10.603
2.	Matt Mortensen / Jayson Terdiman (USA)	2:10.810
3.	Tobias Wendl / Tobias Arlt (GER)	2:11.036
4.	Tristan Walker / Justin Snith (CAN)	2:11.630
5.	Ludwig Rieder / Patrick Rastner (ITA)	2:11.927

- Final standings after 4 events

Only 5 double sleds competed on all events

=== Team Relay ===
Pos.	Team	Points
1.	Germany*	485
2.	Austria	400
3.	Canada	381
4.	Latvia	370
5.	Russia	367
6.	United States	350
7.	Italy	326
8.	Poland	219
9.	Romania	196
10.	Slovakia	191

- Final standings after 6 events
- (*Champion 2017)

== Medal table ==
Rank	Nation	Gold	Silver	Bronze	Total
1	Germany	28	17	22	67
2	Russia	8	6	4	18
3	Austria	3	9	6	18
4	United States	3	2	4	9
5	Italy	3	1	3	7
6	Canada	0	6	2	8
7	Latvia	0	3	4	7
8	Slovakia	0	1	0	1
Totals (8 entries)		45	45	45	135
