= 2014–15 Luge World Cup =

2014/2015 Luge World Cup

Winners
- Men's singles: (Germany) Felix Loch
- Doubles: (Germany) Toni Eggert; Sascha Benecken
- Women's singles: (Germany) Natalie Geisenberger

Competitions
- Venues: 9

The 2014–15 Luge World Cup is a multi race tournament over a season for luge organised by the FIL. The season started on 29 November 2014 in Igls, Austria and ended on 28 February 2015 in Sochi, Russia.

== Calendar ==
Below is the schedule for the 2014/15 season.

Venue	Date	Details
(Austria) Innsbruck	29–30 November 2014	no Team relay
(United States) Lake Placid	5–6 December 2014	
(Canada) Calgary	12–13 December 2014	no Team relay
(Germany) Königssee	3–4 January 2015	
(Germany) Oberhof	17–18 January 2015	
(Germany) Winterberg	24–25 January 2015	
(Norway) Lillehammer	31 January–1 February 2015	
(Germany) Altenberg	21–22 February 2015	no Team relay
(Russia) Sochi	28 February–1 March 2015	

== Results ==
=== Men's singles ===
Event:	Gold:	Time	Silver:	Time	Bronze:	Time
Innsbruck	(Germany) Felix Loch	1:40.428	(Italy) Dominik Fischnaller	1:40.565	(Germany) Andi Langenhan	1:40.629
Innsbruck (Sprint)	(Germany) Felix Loch	33.298	(Italy) Dominik Fischnaller	33.339	(Italy) Kevin Fischnaller	33.429
Lake Placid	(United States) Tucker West	1:42.117	(Austria) Wolfgang Kindl	1:42.890	(Italy) Dominik Fischnaller	1:43.181
Calgary	(Canada) Samuel Edney	46.146	(Germany) Felix Loch	46.255	(United States) Chris Mazdzer	46.263
Calgary (Sprint)	(United States) Chris Mazdzer	30.866	(United States) Tucker West	30.902	(Canada) Samuel Edney	30.915
Königssee	(Germany) Felix Loch	1:39.716	(Germany) Andi Langenhan	1:40.471	(United States) Chris Mazdzer	1:40.525
Oberhof	(Germany) Felix Loch	1:26.828	(Germany) Andi Langenhan	1:27.039	(United States) Chris Mazdzer	1:27.466
Winterberg	(Germany) Felix Loch	1:45.361	(Russia) Stepan Fedorov	1:45.433	(United States) Tucker West	1:45.718
Lillehammer	(Austria) Wolfgang Kindl	1:38.818	(Russia) Semen Pavlichenko	1:38.872	(Italy) Dominik Fischnaller	1:38.964
Altenberg	(Germany) Felix Loch	1:48.193	(Germany) Johannes Ludwig	1:48.463	(Germany) Andi Langenhan	1:48.475
Altenberg (Sprint)	(Germany) Felix Loch	32.826	(Canada) Samuel Edney	32.942	(Latvia) Inārs Kivlenieks	32.995
Sochi	(Russia) Semen Pavlichenko	1:44.020	(Russia) Aleksandr Peretjagin	1:44.252	(Germany) Felix Loch	1:44.339

=== Doubles ===
Event:	Gold:	Time	Silver:	Time	Bronze:	Time
Innsbruck	Toni Eggert; Sascha Benecken; Germany	1:19.330	Vladislav Yuzhakov; Vladimir Prokhorov; Russia	1:19.835	Peter Penz; Georg Fischler; Austria	1:19.850
Innsbruck (Sprint)	Toni Eggert; Sascha Benecken; Germany	31.396	Peter Penz; Georg Fischler; Austria	31.484	Tobias Wendl; Tobias Arlt; Germany	31.539
Lake Placid	Toni Eggert; Sascha Benecken; Germany	1:27.651	Tobias Wendl; Tobias Arlt; Germany	1:28.011	Peter Penz; Georg Fischler; Austria	1:28.131
Calgary	Toni Eggert; Sascha Benecken; Germany	1:27.806	Tobias Wendl; Tobias Arlt; Germany	1:27.845	Tristan Walker; Justin Snith; Canada	1:28.014
Calgary (Sprint)	Tobias Wendl; Tobias Arlt; Germany	36.729	Toni Eggert; Sascha Benecken; Germany	36.798	Andris Šics; Juris Šics; Latvia	36.808
Königssee	Tobias Wendl; Tobias Arlt; Germany	1:40.810	Toni Eggert; Sascha Benecken; Germany	1:40.995	Peter Penz; Georg Fischler; Austria	1:41.034
Oberhof	Tobias Wendl; Tobias Arlt; Germany	1:22.762	Toni Eggert; Sascha Benecken; Germany	1:22.779	Alexander Denisyev; Vladislav Antonov; Russia	1:23.332
Winterberg	Toni Eggert; Sascha Benecken; Germany	1:27.013	Tobias Wendl; Tobias Arlt; Germany	1:27.121	Andris Šics; Juris Šics; Latvia	1:27.523
Lillehammer	Tobias Wendl; Tobias Arlt; Germany	1:35.269	Toni Eggert; Sascha Benecken; Germany	1:35.304	Alexander Denisyev; Vladislav Antonov; Russia	1:35.343
Altenberg	Tobias Wendl; Tobias Arlt; Germany	1:23.146	Toni Eggert; Sascha Benecken; Germany	1:23.218	Andris Šics; Juris Šics; Latvia	1:23.346
Altenberg (Sprint)	Toni Eggert; Sascha Benecken; Germany	27.790	Andris Šics; Juris Šics; Latvia	27.817	Tobias Wendl; Tobias Arlt; Germany	27.843
Sochi	Tobias Wendl; Tobias Arlt; Germany	1:39.559	Peter Penz; Georg Fischler; Austria	1:39.854	Andris Šics; Juris Šics; Latvia	1:40.137

=== Women's singles ===
Event:	Gold:	Time	Silver:	Time	Bronze:	Time
Innsbruck	(Germany) Natalie Geisenberger	1:19.822	(Germany) Dajana Eitberger	1:20.031	(Germany) Tatjana Hüfner	1:20.040
Innsbruck (Sprint)	(Germany) Natalie Geisenberger	31.396	(Germany) Tatjana Hüfner	31.502	(Germany) Anke Wischnewski	31.504
Lake Placid	(Germany) Natalie Geisenberger	1:28.173	(United States) Erin Hamlin	1:28.672	(Germany) Tatjana Hüfner	1:28.822
Calgary	(Germany) Natalie Geisenberger	1:33.860	(Canada) Alex Gough	1:33.918	(Canada) Arianne Jones	1:34.274
Calgary (Sprint)	(Canada) Alex Gough	31.749	(United States) Erin Hamlin	31.759	(Germany) Natalie Geisenberger	31.825
Königssee	(Germany) Natalie Geisenberger	1:41.411	(Canada) Alex Gough	1:41.760	(Germany) Dajana Eitberger	1:41.871
Oberhof	(Germany) Natalie Geisenberger	1:23.104	(Germany) Tatjana Hüfner	1:23.176	(Germany) Dajana Eitberger	1:23.359
Winterberg	(Germany) Natalie Geisenberger	1:53.829	(Germany) Dajana Eitberger	1:54.024	(Germany) Anke Wischnewski	1:54.171
Lillehammer	(Russia) Tatiana Ivanova	1:35.306	(Canada) Alex Gough	1:35.732	(Germany) Dajana Eitberger	1:35.753
Altenberg	(Germany) Natalie Geisenberger	1:45.585	(Germany) Tatjana Hüfner	1:45.868	(Germany) Dajana Eitberger	1:45.915
Altenberg (Sprint)	(United States) Erin Hamlin	37.751	(Germany) Dajana Eitberger	37.896	(Germany) Natalie Geisenberger	37.901
Sochi	(Germany) Dajana Eitberger	1:40.510	(Germany) Natalie Geisenberger	1:40.520	(Russia) Tatiana Ivanova	1:40.601

=== Team relay ===
Event:	Gold:	Time	Silver:	Time	Bronze:	Time
Lake Placid	Natalie Geisenberger; Felix Loch; Toni Eggert; Sascha Benecken; Germany	2:34.886	Sandra Robatscher; Dominik Fischnaller; Christian Oberstolz; Patrick Gruber; Italy	2:35.546	Erin Hamlin; Tucker West; Matthew Mortensen; Jayson Terdiman; United States	2:35.638
Königssee	Natalie Geisenberger; Felix Loch; Tobias Wendl; Tobias Arlt; Germany	2:44.493	Emily Sweeney; Chris Mazdzer; Matthew Mortensen; Jayson Terdiman; United States	2:45.895	Alex Gough; Samuel Edney; Tristan Walker; Justin Snith; Canada	2:46.394
Oberhof	Natalie Geisenberger; Felix Loch; Tobias Wendl; Tobias Arlt; Germany	2:23.279	Erin Hamlin; Chris Mazdzer; Matthew Mortensen; Jayson Terdiman; United States	2:24.062	Tatiana Ivanova; Semen Pavlichenko; Alexander Denisyev; Vladislav Antonov; Russia	2:24.130
Winterberg	Natalie Geisenberger; Felix Loch; Toni Eggert; Sascha Benecken; Germany	2:26.434	Birgit Platzer; Reinhard Egger; Peter Penz; Georg Fischler; Austria	2:26.978	Ekaterina Baturina; Stepan Fedorov; Alexander Denisyev; Vladislav Antonov; Russia	2:27.044
Lillehammer	Dajana Eitberger; Felix Loch; Tobias Wendl; Tobias Arlt; Germany	2:37.349	Tatiana Ivanova; Semen Pavlichenko; Alexander Denisyev; Vladislav Antonov; Russia	2:37.356	Birgit Platzer; Wolfgang Kindl; Peter Penz; Georg Fischler; Austria	2:37.655
Sochi	Dajana Eitberger; Felix Loch; Tobias Wendl; Tobias Arlt; Germany	2:45.468	Tatiana Ivanova; Semen Pavlichenko; Alexander Denisyev; Vladislav Antonov; Russia	2:45.528	Elīza Tīruma; Inārs Kivlenieks; Andris Šics; Juris Šics; Latvia	2:45.775

== Standings ==
=== Men's singles ===
Pos.	Luger	Points
1.	Felix Loch (GER)	975
2.	Andi Langenhan (GER)	645
3.	Wolfgang Kindl (AUT)	605
4.	Dominik Fischnaller (ITA)	556
5.	Chris Mazdzer (USA)	547
6.	Tucker West (USA)	445
7.	Samuel Edney (CAN)	431
8.	Alexandr Peretjagin (RUS)	423
9.	Stepan Fedorov (RUS)	423
10.	Reinhard Egger (AUT)	396

=== Men's doubles ===
Pos.	Luger	Points
1.	Toni Eggert / Sascha Benecken (GER)	1071
2.	Tobias Wendl / Tobias Arlt (GER)	1055
3.	Andris Šics / Juris Šics (LAT)	749
4.	Peter Penz / Georg Fischler (AUT)	672
5.	Christian Oberstolz / Patrick Gruber (ITA)	607
6.	Vladislav Yuzhakov / Vladimir Prokhorov (RUS)	489
7.	Matthew Mortensen / Jayson Terdiman (USA)	480
8.	Ludwig Rieder / Patrick Rastner (ITA)	430
9.	Tristan Walker / Justin Snith (CAN)	402
10.	Florian Gruber / Simon Kainzwaldner (ITA)	392

=== Women's singles ===
Pos.	Luger	Points
1.	Natalie Geisenberger (GER)	1080
2.	Dajana Eitberger (GER)	851
3.	Tatjana Hüfner (GER)	727
4.	Anke Wischnewski (GER)	686
5.	Erin Hamlin (USA)	624
6.	Martina Kocher (SUI)	472
7.	Alex Gough (CAN)	470
8.	Kimberley McRae (CAN)	457
9.	Emily Sweeney (USA)	371
10.	Arianne Jones (CAN)	349

=== Team Relay ===
Pos.	Luger	Points
1.	Germany	600
2.	Russia	420
3.	United States	405
4.	Canada	310
5.	Austria	295
6.	Latvia	250
7.	Italy	190
8.	Poland	173
9.	Romania	169
10.	Ukraine	138
