= 2017 FIL World Luge Championships – Women's sprint =

Women's sprint at the 2017 FIL World Luge Championships
- Venue: Olympic Sliding Centre Innsbruck
- Location: Igls, Austria
- Dates: 27 January
- Competitors: 15 from 8 nations
- Winning time: 30.074

Medalists
gold medal	Erin Hamlin	United States
silver medal	Martina Kocher	Switzerland
bronze medal	Tatjana Hüfner	Germany

2017 FIL World Luge Championships
Individual	men		women
Doubles	doubles
Sprint	men	doubles	women
Relay		mixed

The women's sprint competition at the 2017 World Championships was held on 27 January 2017.

A qualification was held to determine the 15 participants.

== Results ==
The final was started at 13:33.

Rank	Bib	Name	Country	Time	Diff
1st place, gold medalist(s)	10	Erin Hamlin	United States	30.074	
2nd place, silver medalist(s)	8	Martina Kocher	Switzerland	30.083	+0.009
3rd place, bronze medalist(s)	9	Tatjana Hüfner	Germany	30.084	+0.010
4	7	Emily Sweeney	United States	30.089	+0.015
5	12	Dajana Eitberger	Germany	30.091	+0.027
6	13	Tatiana Ivanova	Russia	30.099	+0.025
7	4	Kimberley McRae	Canada	30.109	+0.035
8	1	Miriam Kastlunger	Austria	30.116	+0.042
9	2	Birgit Platzer	Austria	30.117	+0.043
10	5	Ulla Zirne	Latvia	30.120	+0.046
11	14	Summer Britcher	United States	30.141	+0.067
12	15	Julia Taubitz	Germany	30.152	+0.078
13	3	Elīza Cauce	Latvia	30.213	+0.139
14	6	Andrea Vötter	Italy	30.237	+0.163
15	11	Natalie Geisenberger	Germany	30.339	+0.265
