= 2017 FIL World Luge Championships – Men's sprint =

Men's sprint at the 2017 FIL World Luge Championships
- Venue: Olympic Sliding Centre Innsbruck
- Location: Igls, Austria
- Dates: 27 January
- Competitors: 15 from 6 nations
- Winning time: 32.467

Medalists
gold medal	Wolfgang Kindl	Austria
silver medal	Roman Repilov	Russia
bronze medal	Dominik Fischnaller	Italy

2017 FIL World Luge Championships
Individual	men		women
Doubles	doubles
Sprint	men	doubles	women
Relay		mixed

The Men's sprint competition at the 2017 FIL World Luge Championships was held on 27 January 2017.

A qualification was held to determine the 15 participants.

== Results ==
The final was started at 15:16.

Rank	Bib	Name	Country	Time	Diff
1st place, gold medalist(s)	14	Wolfgang Kindl	Austria	32.467	
2nd place, silver medalist(s)	13	Roman Repilov	Russia	32.479	+0.012
3rd place, bronze medalist(s)	15	Dominik Fischnaller	Italy	32.590	+0.123
4	10	Semen Pavlichenko	Russia	32.594	+0.127
5	2	Taylor Morris	United States	32.611	+0.144
6	9	Andi Langenhan	Germany	32.643	+0.176
7	3	Theo Gruber	Italy	32.661	+0.194
8	6	Riks Rozītis	Latvia	32.670	+0.203
9	8	Kevin Fischnaller	Italy	32.676	+0.209
10	7	Felix Loch	Germany	32.677	+0.210
11	11	Stepan Fedorov	Russia	32.722	+0.255
12	1	David Gleirscher	Austria	32.728	+0.261
12	4	Armin Frauscher	Austria	32.728	+0.261
14	5	Tucker West	United States	32.791	+0.324
15	12	Johannes Ludwig	Germany	35.585	+3.118
