= 2017 FIL World Luge Championships – Women's singles =

Women's singles at the 2017 FIL World Luge Championships
- Venue: Olympic Sliding Centre Innsbruck
- Location: Igls, Austria
- Dates: 28 January
- Competitors: 45 from 20 nations
- Winning time: 1:19.712

Medalists
gold medal	Tatjana Hüfner	Germany
silver medal	Erin Hamlin	United States
bronze medal	Kimberley McRae	Canada

2017 FIL World Luge Championships
Individual	men		women
Doubles	doubles
Sprint	men	doubles	women
Relay		mixed

The Women's singles competition at the 2017 World Championships was held on 28 January 2017.

== Results ==
The first run as started at 10:03 and the second run at 11:52.

Rank	Bib	Name	Country	Run 1	Rank	Run 2	Rank	Total	Diff
1st place, gold medalist(s)	3	Tatjana Hüfner	Germany	39.829	1	39.883	2	1:19.712	
2nd place, silver medalist(s)	4	Erin Hamlin	United States	39.908	2	40.017	7	1:19.925	+0.213
3rd place, bronze medalist(s)	7	Kimberley McRae	Canada	40.052	10	39.900	3	1:19.952	+0.240
4	12	Summer Britcher	United States	39.998	6	39.989	6	1:19.987	+0.275
5	1	Alex Gough	Canada	39.920	3	40.081	10	1:20.001	+0.289
6	2	Natalie Geisenberger	Germany	40.184	17	39.822	1	1:20.006	+0.294
7	11	Martina Kocher	Switzerland	40.057	11	39.950	5	1:20.007	+0.295
8	21	Julia Taubitz	Germany	39.966	4	40.060	9	1:20.026	+0.314
9	13	Dajana Eitberger	Germany	39.976	5	40.093	11	1:20.069	+0.357
10	10	Birgit Platzer	Austria	40.036	7	40.052	8	1:20.088	+0.376
11	5	Tatiana Ivanova	Russia	40.172	14	39.931	4	1:20.103	+0.391
12	20	Ekaterina Baturina	Russia	40.036	7	40.160	13	1:20.196	+0.484
13	17	Victoria Demchenko	Russia	40.047	9	40.158	12	1:20.205	+0.493
14	18	Andrea Vötter	Italy	40.125	12	40.175	15	1:20.300	+0.588
15	6	Emily Sweeney	United States	40.238	19	40.173	14	1:20.411	+0.699
16	19	Raychel Germaine	United States	40.218	18	40.201	16	1:20.419	+0.707
17	22	Sandra Robatscher	Italy	40.174	15	40.330	17	1:20.504	+0.792
18	23	Hannah Prock	Austria	40.177	16	40.473	18	1:20.650	+0.938
19	24	Raluca Strămăturaru	Romania	40.263	20	40.648	19	1:20.911	+1.199
20	16	Kendija Aparjode	Latvia	40.280	DNQ				
21	9	Miriam Kastlunger	Austria	40.284	DNQ				
22	28	Olena Shkhumova	Ukraine	40.345	DNQ				
23	27	Veronica Ravenna	Argentina	40.347	DNQ				
24	25	Ewa Kuls	Poland	40.362	DNQ				
25	15	Ekaterina Katnikova	Russia	40.367	DNQ				
26	34	Madeleine Egle	Austria	40.387	DNQ				
27	26	Brooke Apshkrum	Canada	40.421	DNQ				
28	30	Natalia Wojtuściszyn	Poland	40.445	DNQ				
29	31	Mihaela Manolescu	Romania	40.469	DNQ				
30	32	Vilde Tangnes	Norway	40.472	DNQ				
31	35	Daria Obratov	Croatia	40.598	DNQ				
32	36	Cezara Curmei	Romania	40.623	DNQ				
33	37	Sung Eun-ryung	South Korea	40.650	DNQ				
34	29	Aileen Frisch	South Korea	40.691	DNQ				
35	33	Olena Stetskiv	Ukraine	40.875	DNQ				
36	38	Choi Eun-ju	South Korea	40.915	DNQ				
37	39	Danielle Scott	Great Britain	41.026	DNQ				
38	41	Karoline Melas	Norway	41.029	DNQ				
39	42	Tereza Nosková	Czech Republic	41.086	DNQ				
40	14	Ulla Zirne	Latvia	41.089	DNQ				
41	40	Tove Kohala	Sweden	41.168	DNQ				
42	43	Dania Obratov	Croatia	41.315	DNQ				
43	44	Anastassiya Bogacheva	Kazakhstan	41.465	DNQ				
44	45	Simona Zmijová	Slovakia	45.135	DNQ				
—	8	Elīza Cauce	Latvia	40.142	13	DNF			
