= 2017 FIL World Luge Championships – Team relay =

Team relay at the 2017 FIL World Luge Championships
- Venue: Olympic Sliding Centre Innsbruck
- Location: Igls, Austria
- Dates: 29 January
- Competitors: 60 from 15 nations
- Teams: 15
- Winning time: 2:08.474

Medalists
gold medal	Tatjana Hüfner; Johannes Ludwig; Toni Eggert/Sascha Benecken	Germany
silver medal	Erin Hamlin; Tucker West; Matthew Mortensen/Jayson Terdiman	United States
bronze medal	Tatiana Ivanova; Roman Repilov; Alexander Denisyev/Vladislav Antonov	Russia

2017 FIL World Luge Championships
Individual	men		women
Doubles	doubles
Sprint	men	doubles	women
Relay		mixed

The Team relay competition at the 2017 World Championships was held on 29 January 2017.

== Results ==
The race was started at 15:03.

Rank	Bib	Country	Time	Diff
1st place, gold medalist(s)	15	Germany	2:08.474	
2nd place, silver medalist(s)	11	United States	2:08.664	+0.190
3rd place, bronze medalist(s)	13	Russia	2:08.984	+0.510
4	12	Italy	2:08.995	+0.521
5	14	Austria	2:09.050	+0.576
6	10	Canada	2:09.090	+0.616
7	9	Latvia	2:09.199	+0.725
8	6	Poland	2:09.963	+1.489
9	5	Czech Republic	2:10.489	+2.015
10	8	Romania	2:10.513	+2.039
11	4	South Korea	2:10.602	+2.128
12	3	Slovakia	2:11.473	+2.999
13	7	Ukraine	2:11.603	+3.129
14	2	Great Britain	2:12.336	+3.862
—	1	Kazakhstan	DNF	
