= 2017 FIL European Luge Championships =

The 2017 FIL European Luge Championships took place under the auspices of the International Luge Federation at Königssee, Germany from 05 to 06 January 2017.

== Schedule ==
Four events will be held.

Date	Time	Events
05 January	11:40	Doubles first run
05 January	13:00	Doubles second run
05 January	14:20	Women first run
05 January	15:40	Women second run*
06 January	11:30	Men first run
06 January	13:05	Men second run
06 January	15:10	Team relay

* Women's Singles 2nd run, delayed due to weather conditions

== Medalists ==
Event:	Gold:	Time	Silver:	Time	Bronze:	Time
Men's Singles	(Russia) Semen Pavlichenko	1:38.363	(Germany) Ralf Palik	1:38.611	(Austria) Wolfgang Kindl	1:38.823
Women's Singles	(Germany) Natalie Geisenberger	51.178	(Russia) Tatiana Ivanova	51.329	(Germany) Tatjana Hüfner	51.433
Doubles	Tobias Wendl; Tobias Arlt; Germany	1:41.575	Toni Eggert; Sascha Benecken; Germany	1:41.645	Robin Johannes Geueke; David Gamm; Germany	1:42.357
Team Relay	Germany; Natalie Geisenberger; Ralf Palik; Tobias Wendl/Tobias Arlt	2:42.348	Austria; Miriam Kastlunger; Wolfgang Kindl; Thomas Steu/Lorenz Koller	2:43.617	Latvia; Elīza Tīruma; Arturs Darznieks; Andris Šics/Juris Šics	2:43.986

== Medal table ==
Rank	Nation	Gold	Silver	Bronze	Total
1	Germany (GER)	3	2	2	7
2	Russia (RUS)	1	1	0	2
3	Austria (AUT)	0	1	1	2
4	Latvia (LAT)	0	0	1	1
Totals (4 entries)		4	4	4	12
