= Stepan Fedorov =

Russian luger (born 1987)

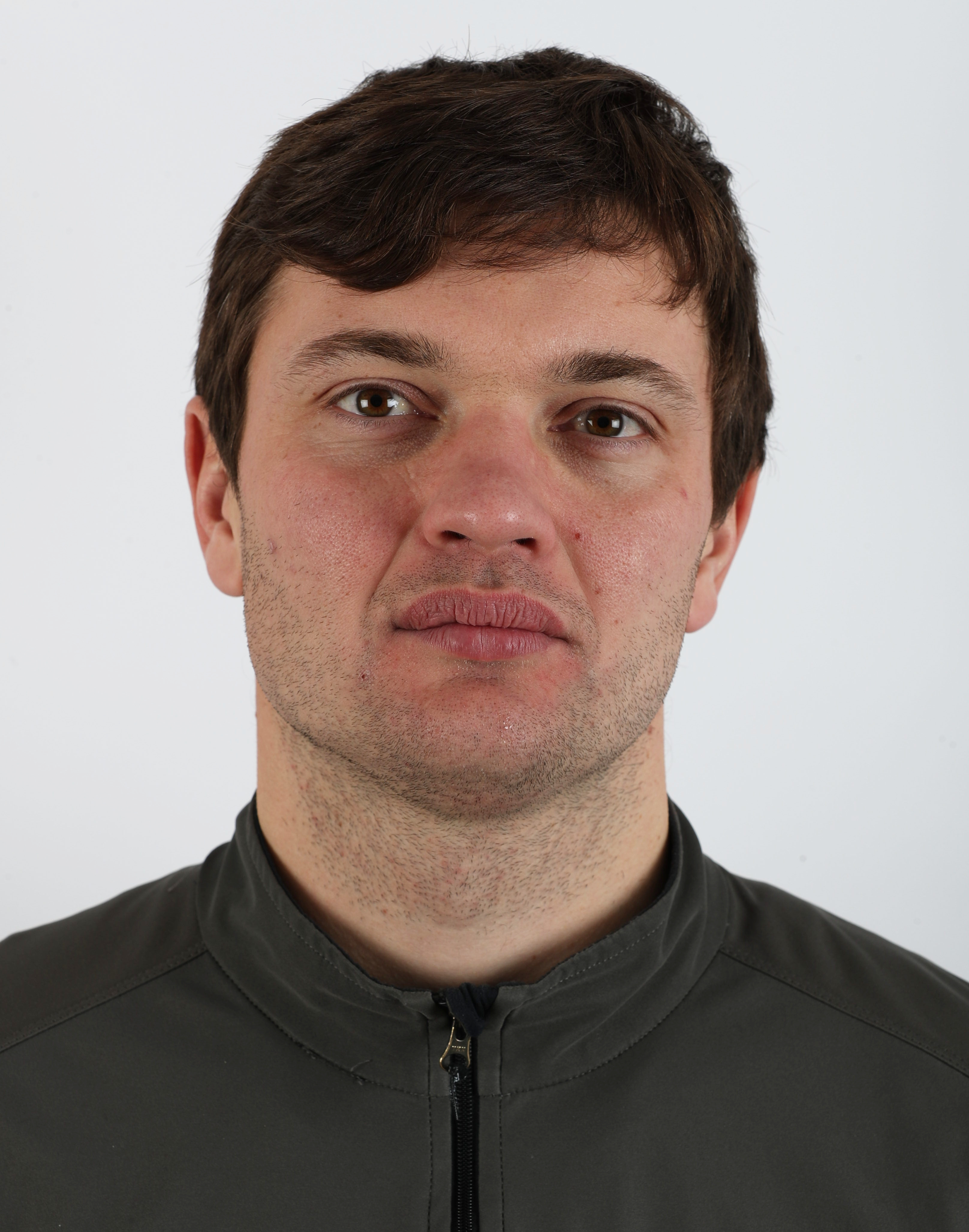
- Fedorov in 2018

Personal information
- Full name: Stepan Valeryevich Fedorov
- Nationality: Russian
- Born: 8 May 1987 (age 39) Tashtagol, RSFSR, USSR (now Russia)
- Height: 1.89 m (6 ft 2 in)
- Weight: 87 kg (192 lb)

Stepan Valeryevich Fedorov (Russian: Степан Валерьевич Фёдоров; born 8 May 1987) is a Russian luger who has competed since 1999. He finished twelfth in the men's singles event at a World Cup event in Calgary on 21 November 2009.

== Career ==
Fedorov's best finish at the FIL World Luge Championships was 26th in the men's singles event at Oberhof in 2008. He also finished 22nd in the same event at the FIL European Luge Championships 2008 in Cesana.

He competed at the 2010 Winter Olympics where he finished 19th in the men's singles event.

At the beginning of Russia's invasion of Ukraine in late February 2022, Fedorov supported Russia on social media.

== World Cup podiums ==
Season	Date	Location	Discipline	Place
2014–15	January 24, 2015	Winterberg, Germany	Singles	2nd
2014–15	January 25, 2015	Winterberg, Germany	Team Relay	3rd
2015–16	February 21, 2016	Winterberg, Germany	Singles	1st
2015–16	February 21, 2016	Winterberg, Germany	Team Relay	2nd
2016–17	November 27, 2016	Winterberg, Germany	Singles (sprint)	2nd
2017–18	November 26, 2017	Winterberg, Germany	Singles	3rd
