= Andrei Medvedev (luger) =

Russian luger (born 1993)

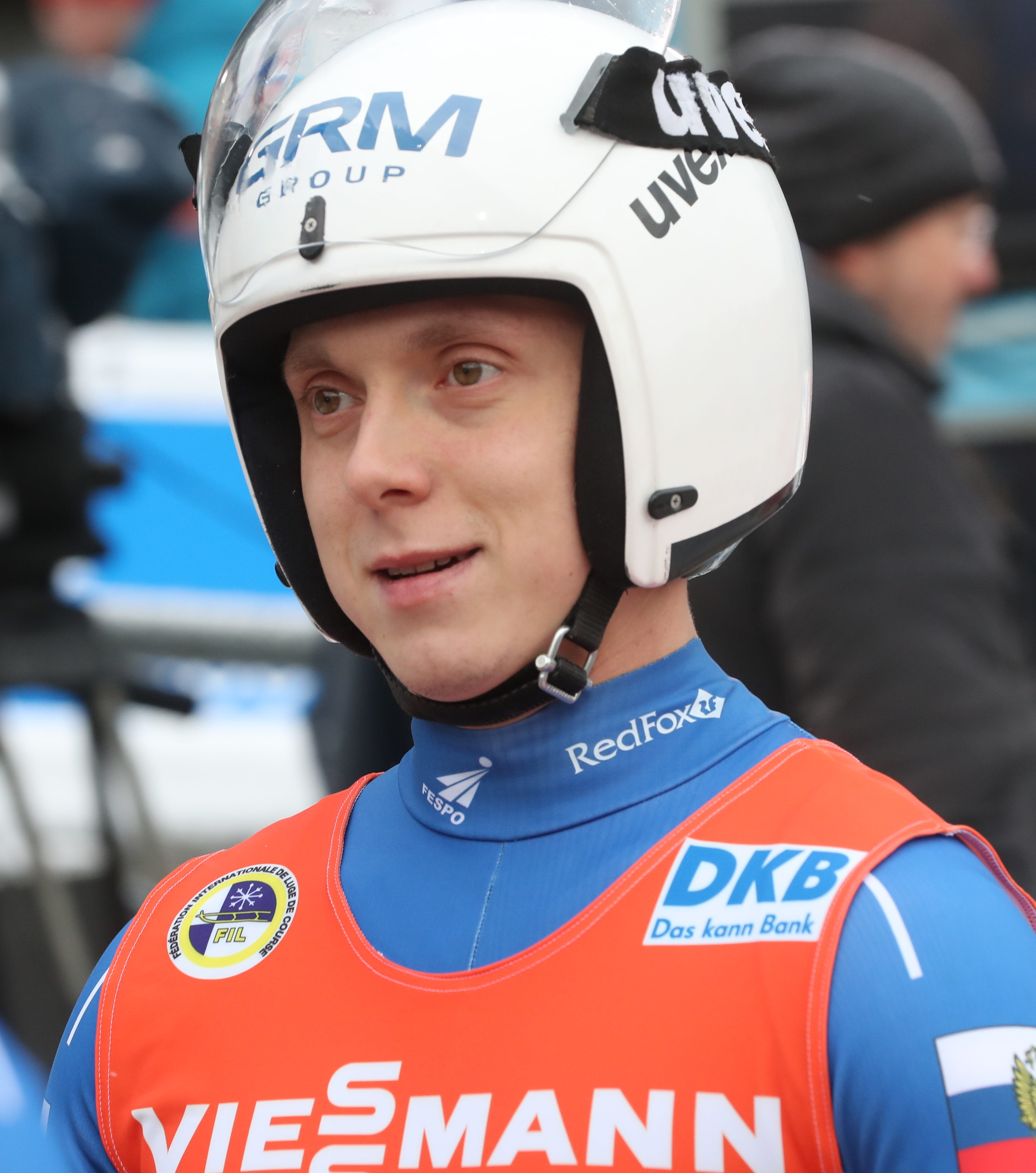
- Medvedev in 2017

Personal information
- Nationality: Russian
- Born: 14 October 1993 (age 31)

Sport
- Sport: Luge

Andrei Medvedev (born 14 October 1993) is a Russian luger. He competed in the men's doubles event at the 2018 Winter Olympics.
