= Pēteris Kalniņš =

Latvian luger (born 1988)

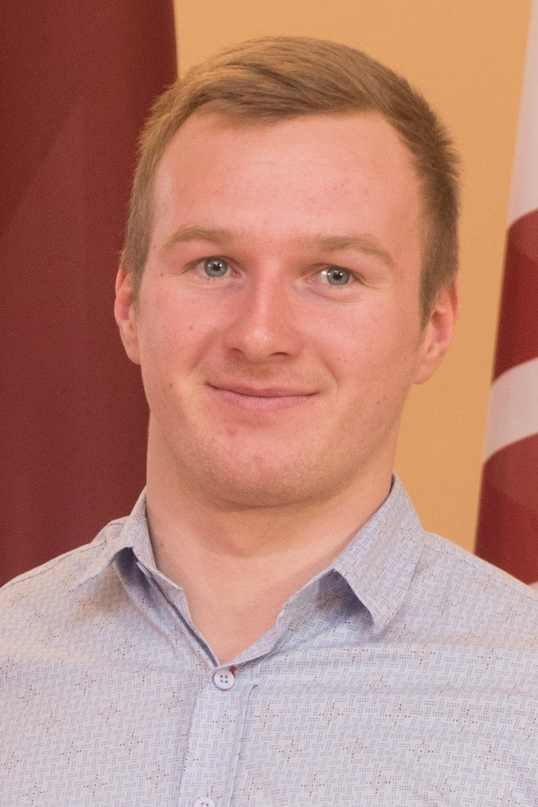
Pēteris Kalniņš in 2015

Pēteris Kalniņš (born 15 December 1988, in Riga) is a Latvian luger who has competed since 2004. He finished 26th in men's doubles at the FIL World Luge Championships 2007 in Igls.

Kalniņš also finished seventh in the doubles event at the FIL European Luge Championships 2010 in Sigulda.

He qualified for the 2010 Winter Olympics where he finished 12th with Oskars Gudramovičs.
