= Oskars Gudramovičs =

Latvian luger (born 1988)

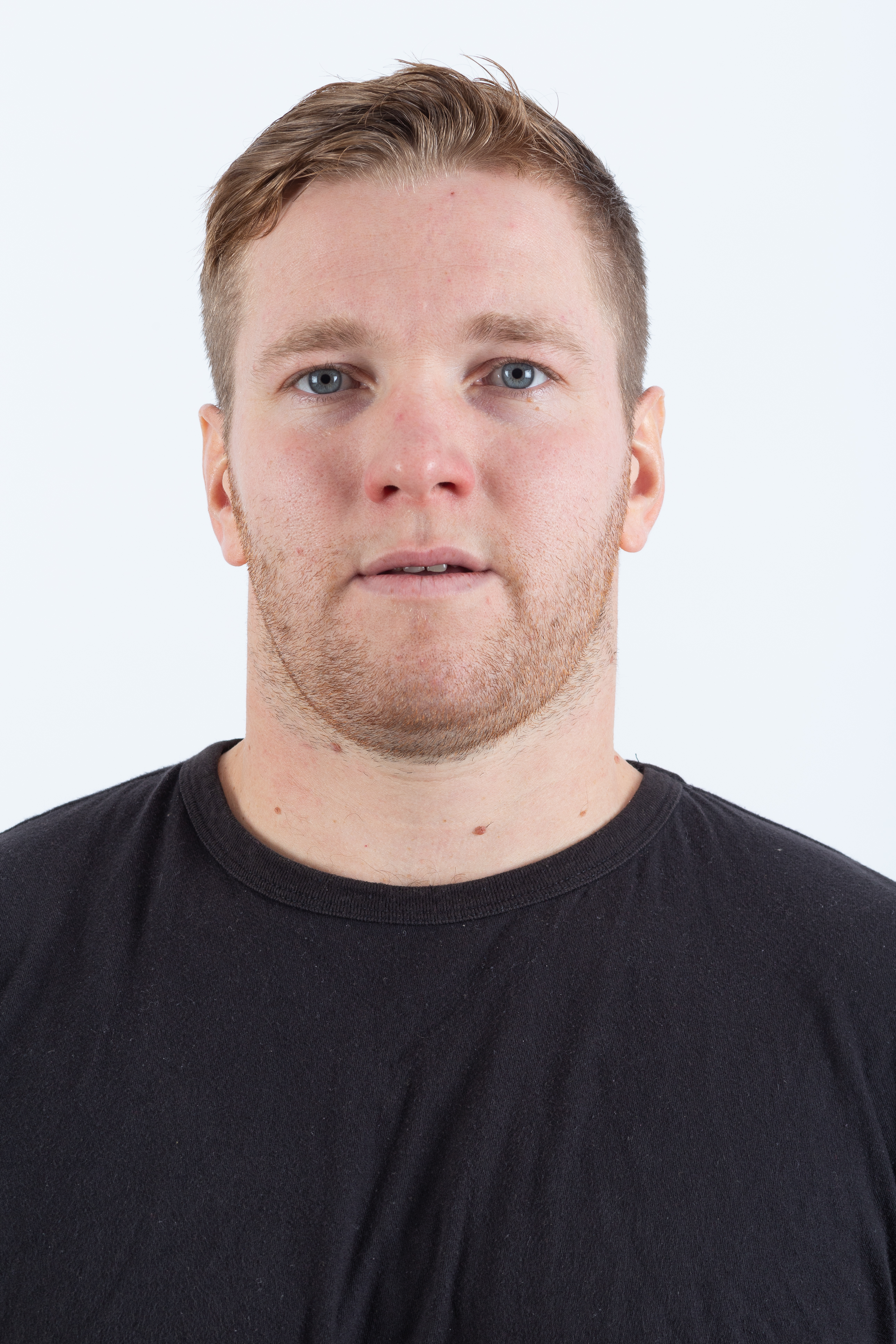
Gudramovičs in 2018

Oskars Gudramovičs (born 4 July 1988 in Riga) is a Latvian luger who has competed since 2004. He finished 26th in men's doubles at the FIL World Luge Championships 2007 in Igls.

Gudramovičs also finished seventh in the doubles event at the FIL European Luge Championships 2010 in Sigulda.

He qualified for the 2010 Winter Olympics where he finished 12th in the men's doubles event with Pēteris Kalniņš.
