= Ralf Palik =

German luger (born 1990)

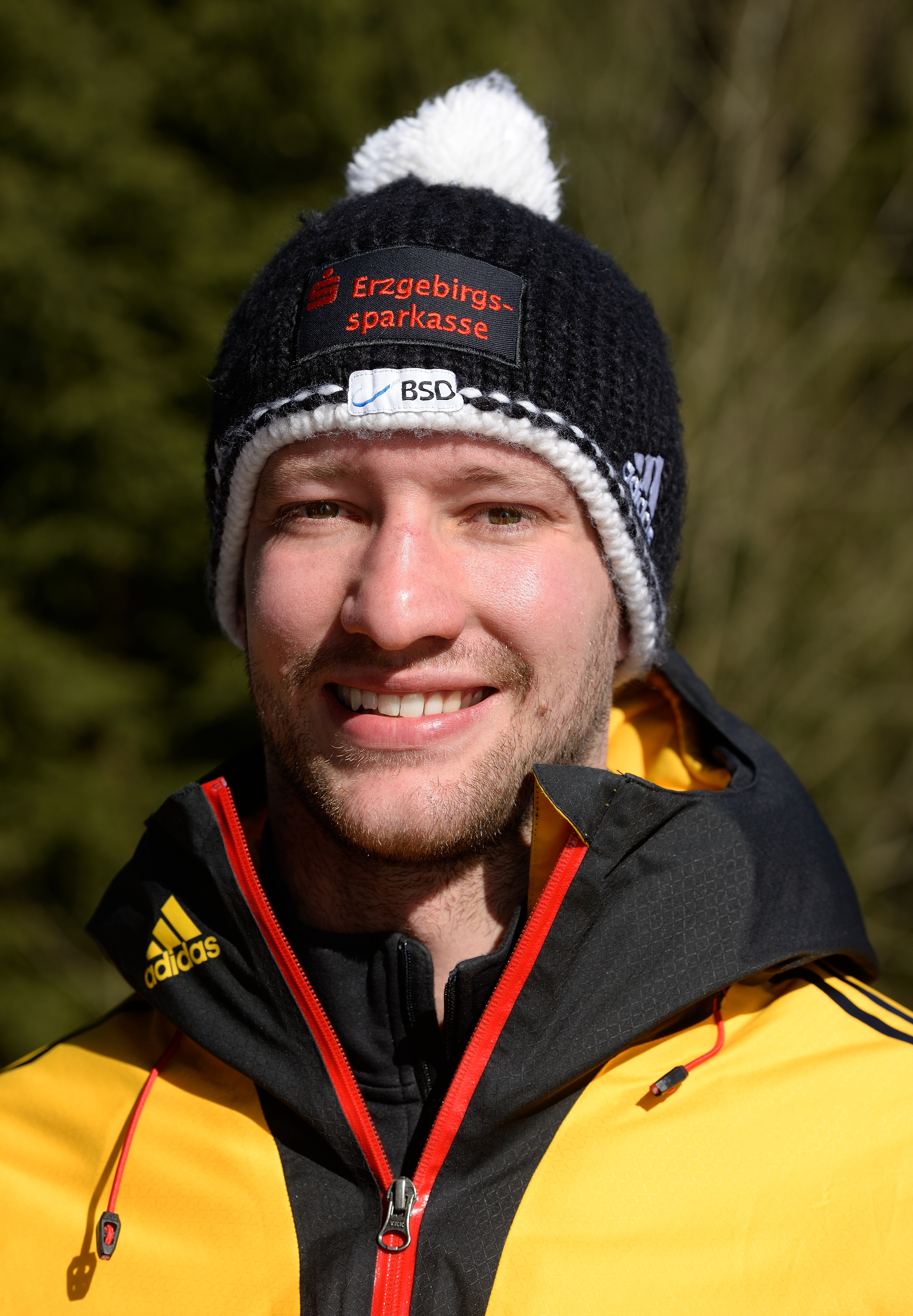
- Palik in 2015

Personal information
- Nationality: German
- Born: 2 September 1990 (age 35) Erlabrunn, East Germany
- Height: 1.93 m (6 ft 4 in)
- Weight: 94 kg (207 lb)

Sport
- Country: Germany
- Sport: Luge
- Event: Singles
Medal record
World Championships
Silver medal – second place	2016 Königssee	Singles
Bronze medal – third place	2016 Königssee	Sprint
European Championships
Gold medal – first place	2017 Königssee	Mixed team
Silver medal – second place	2017 Königssee	Singles
Bronze medal – third place	2016 Altenberg	Singles

Ralf Palik (born 2 September 1990) is a German luger who has competed since 2002. At 2010–11 Luge World Cup season he placed 38th with 50 points. At 2011–12 Luge World Cup season he placed 6th with 366 points. At Winterberg in January 2012 he was second.
