= Erin Hamlin =

American luger (born 1986)

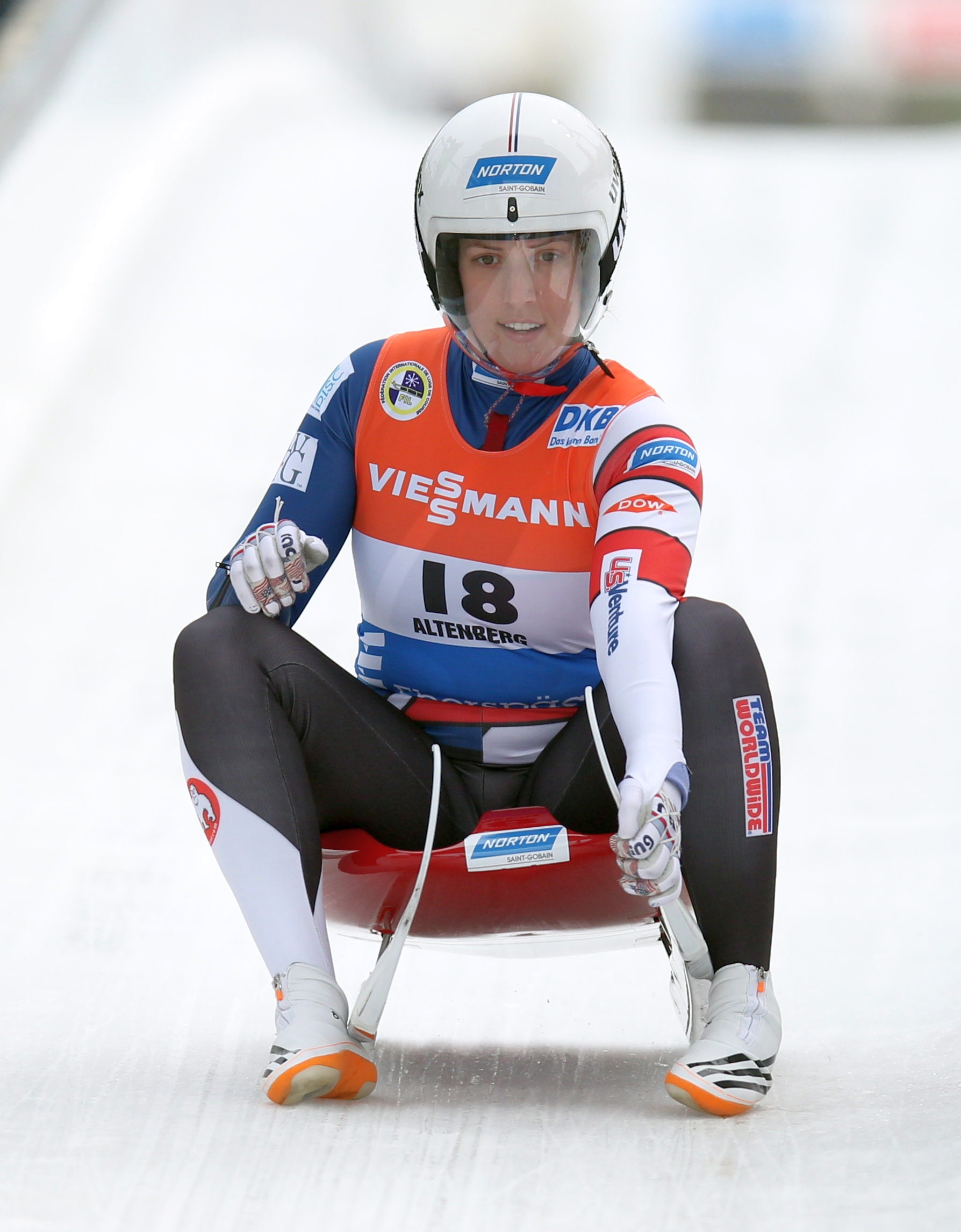
- Hamlin in February 2017

Personal information
- Full name: Erin Mullady Hamlin
- Born: November 19, 1986 (age 39) New Hartford, New York, United States
- Height: 5 ft 7 in (170 cm)
- Weight: 161 lb (73 kg)

Sport
- Sport: Luge
Medal record
Women's Luge
Representing the United States
Event	1st	2nd	3rd
Olympic Games	0	0	1
World Championships	2	2	0
Total	2	2	1
Olympic Games
Bronze medal – third place	2014 Sochi	Singles
World Championships
Gold medal – first place	2009 Lake Placid	Singles
Gold medal – first place	2017 Igls	Sprint
Silver medal – second place	2017 Igls	Singles
Silver medal – second place	2017 Igls	Mixed team

Erin Mullady Hamlin (born 19 November 1986) is a four-time Olympian and the first female American luger to medal at any Winter Olympics, as well as the first American of either gender to medal in luge singles competition and the first non-European woman to take an Olympic medal in luge. She took the singles bronze medal in Sochi's 2014 Winter Olympics, something the Associated Press called "a feat that will surely go down as perhaps the greatest moment in USA Luge history".

== Career ==
At age 12 Hamlin took an interest in luge and attended the U.S. Luge Screening Camp in Syracuse, NY. By age 17 Hamlin won a gold medal at the Junior National Luge Championship held in Lake Placid, NY. At this event Hamlin finished first in the women's singles race with a two-run time of 1-minute, 34.097 seconds.

In 2004, Hamlin won ten medals in five years of racing. Hamlin raced in the Junior World Cups held in Germany and Austria. She participated in the Junior World Championships. She placed seventh in the 2004 Junior World Cups, making her a U.S. junior national luge champion where she competed around the world as a member of the U.S. Junior National Team.

In 2006 Hamlin represented the United States at the Olympic Games held in Torino, Italy and again in 2010 when the Olympic Games were held in Vancouver, British Columbia, Canada. She had been viewed as a medal contender for the 2010 Games after she had enjoyed her best Luge World Cup season to date, placing fourth in the 2009-10 season standings, however she could only finish 16th at the Games themselves.

In 2009, Hamlin placed first at the FIL World Luge Championships held in Lake Placid, New York. This marked the first time in 99 races that a German woman was not the top finisher. It also made her the first American to win a world championship in luge. In addition, Hamlin and third-placed Natalia Yakushenko were the first non-German world championship medallists in women's luge since the Austrian Angelika Neuner in 1997.

In 2014 Hamlin earned a bronze medal at the Olympic Games held in Sochi, Russia.

Other accomplishments include 2017 World Championship silver medalist, 2017 World Champion in sprint discipline, 2017 World Championship silver medalist as lead leg in team relay, 4 World Cup victories, 23 World Cup medals.

Hamlin competed in her fourth and last Winter Olympics at the 2018 Olympic Games in Pyeongchang, South Korea. She was selected as the U.S. Flag Bearer in the Opening Ceremony on February 9.

== Personal life ==
A native of Remsen, New York, Hamlin also makes her home in Lake Placid. She is the daughter of Eileen and Ronald Hamlin who both reside in Remsen. Hamlin attended Remsen Junior-Senior High School where she was a Sectional All-Star in both soccer and track. Hamlin graduated in 2004.

In 2009, Hamlin became a spokesperson for the National Headache Foundation in the wake of her suffering migraine headaches.

Hamlin is sponsored by Adirondack Bank and has appeared in print advertisements and commercials that air locally in the Utica/Rome area.

Hamlin retired after the 2018 Winter Olympic Games saying, "I can now officially, officially say that I'm done. Done. Now that I'm qualified I can say that I'm out [after the Games]."

Olympic Games
Preceded by Michael Phelps	Flagbearer for United States; Pyeongchang 2018	Succeeded by Sue Bird; Eddy Alvarez
