= Matt Mortensen =

American luger (born 1985)

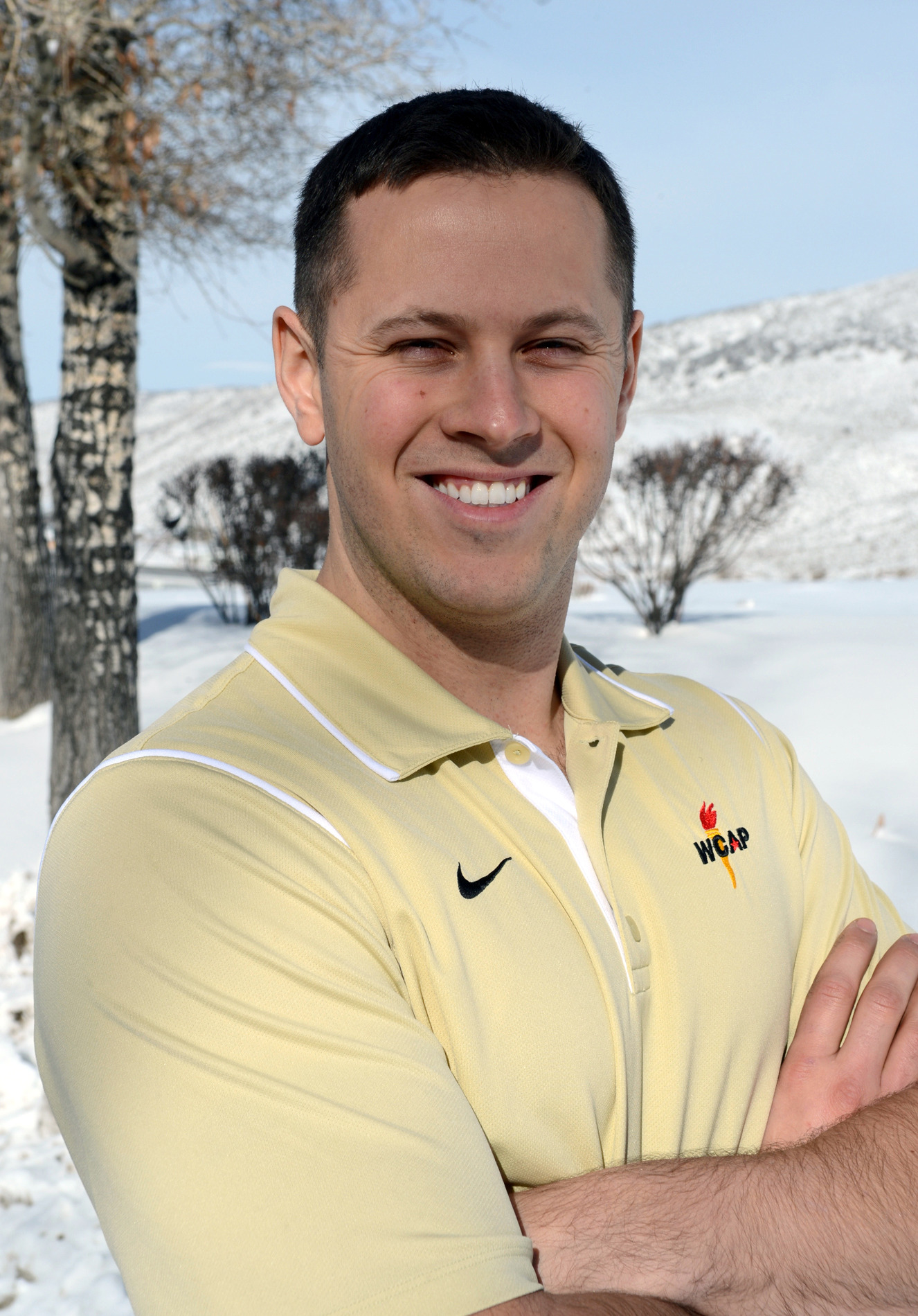
- Mortensen in 2013

Personal information
- Full name: Matthew Mortensen
- Nationality: American
- Born: December 11, 1985 (age 40) Huntington Station, New York, U.S.
- Height: 1.83 m (6 ft 0 in)
- Weight: 85 kg (187 lb)

Sport
- Country: United States
- Sport: Luge
- Club: U.S. Army WCAP
Medal record
World Championships
Silver medal – second place	2017 Igls	Mixed team

Matthew "Matt" Mortensen (born December 11, 1985) is an American luger who has been competing since 2000. His best Luge World Cup season finish was silver in both the Lake Placid, United States, and Altenberg, Germany, World Cups in 2016–2017. Mortensen and teammate Jayson Terdiman finished the 2016–2017 season ranked 3rd internationally.

Mortensen's best finish at the FIL World Luge Championships was 7th in the doubles event in Cesana, Italy, in 2011 and 2nd in the Team Relay event in the 2017 World Championships in Igls, Austria.

He serves as an electrician in the 1156th Engineering Company of the New York Army National Guard, and is a member of the U.S. Army World Class Athlete Program.

Mortensen finished 14th in the doubles luge with teammate Preston Griffall at the 2014 Winter Olympics in Sochi. After Griffall chose to focus on his education for the 2014–15 season, Mortensen teamed up with Jayson Terdiman.
