= Jayson Terdiman =

American luger (born 1988)

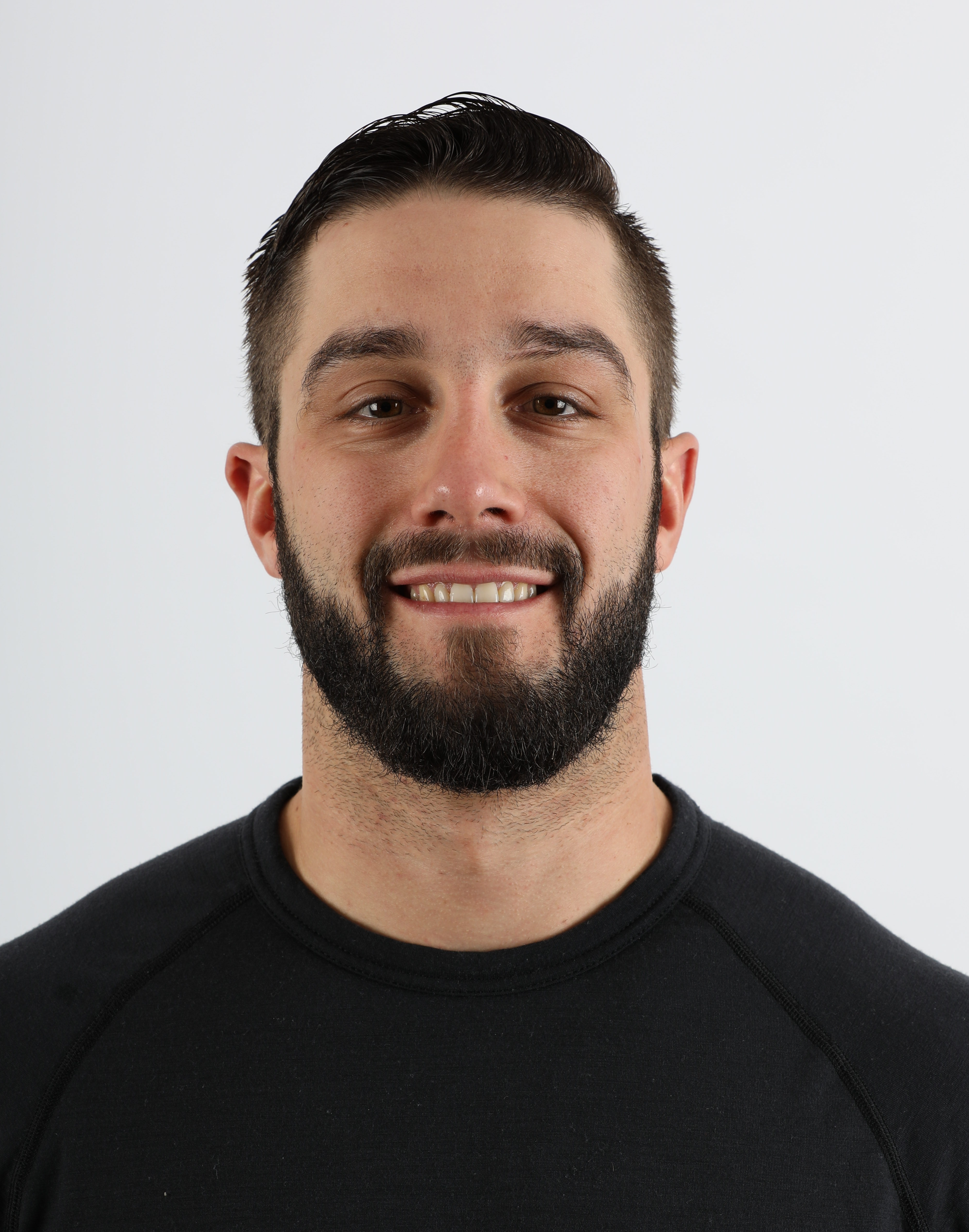
- Terdiman in 2018

Personal information
- Nationality: American
- Born: December 21, 1988 (age 37) East Stroudsburg, U.S.
- Height: 5 ft 8 in (173 cm)
- Weight: 154 lb (70 kg)

Sport
- Country: United States
- Sport: Luge
- Event: Doubles
Medal record
World Championships
Silver medal – second place	2017 Igls	Mixed team
Bronze medal – third place	2020 Sochi	Mixed team

Jayson Terdiman (born December 21, 1988) is an American luger. Terdiman competed at the 2014 Winter Olympics in Sochi, Russia where he finished 11th in the doubles luge competition with Christian Niccum. Following Niccum's retirement after the Olympics, Terdiman teamed up with Matthew Mortensen.
