= 2017 FIL World Luge Championships =

International luge competition

The 2017 FIL World Luge Championships took place under the auspices of the International Luge Federation at the Olympic Sliding Centre Innsbruck in Innsbruck, Austria from 27 to 29 January 2017.

== Schedule ==
Five events were held.

Date	Time	Events
27 January	13:30	Sprint
28 January	10:00	Women
28 January	13:30	Doubles
29 January	10:25	Men
29 January	15:00	Team relay

== Medal summary ==
=== Medal table ===
Rank	Nation	Gold	Silver	Bronze	Total
1	Germany (GER)	4	1	3	8
2	Austria (AUT)	2	1	0	3
3	United States (USA)	1	2	0	3
4	Russia (RUS)	0	2	1	3
5	Switzerland (SUI)	0	1	0	1
6	Italy (ITA)	0	0	2	2
7	Canada (CAN)	0	0	1	1
Totals (7 entries)		7	7	7	21

=== Medalists ===
Event	Gold		Silver		Bronze	
Men's singles	Wolfgang Kindl; Austria	1:39.799	Roman Repilov; Russia	1:39.861	Dominik Fischnaller; Italy	1:39.919
Men's sprint	Wolfgang Kindl; Austria	32.467	Roman Repilov; Russia	32.479	Dominik Fischnaller; Italy	32.590
Women's singles	Tatjana Hüfner; Germany	1:19.712	Erin Hamlin; United States	1:19.925	Kimberley McRae; Canada	1:19.952
Women's sprint	Erin Hamlin; United States	30.074	Martina Kocher; Switzerland	30.083	Tatjana Hüfner; Germany	30.084
Doubles	Toni Eggert/Sascha Benecken; Germany	1:19.005	Tobias Wendl/Tobias Arlt; Germany	1:19.211	Robin Geueke/David Gamm; Germany	1:19.390
Doubles' sprint	Tobias Wendl/Tobias Arlt; Germany	29.843	Peter Penz/Georg Fischler; Austria	29.949	Toni Eggert/Sascha Benecken; Germany	29.956
Team relay	Germany; Tatjana Hüfner; Johannes Ludwig; Toni Eggert/Sascha Benecken	2:08.474	United States; Erin Hamlin; Tucker West; Matthew Mortensen/Jayson Terdiman	2:08.664	Russia; Tatiana Ivanova; Roman Repilov; Alexander Denisyev/Vladislav Antonov	2:08.984
