= Summer Britcher =

American luger (born 1994)

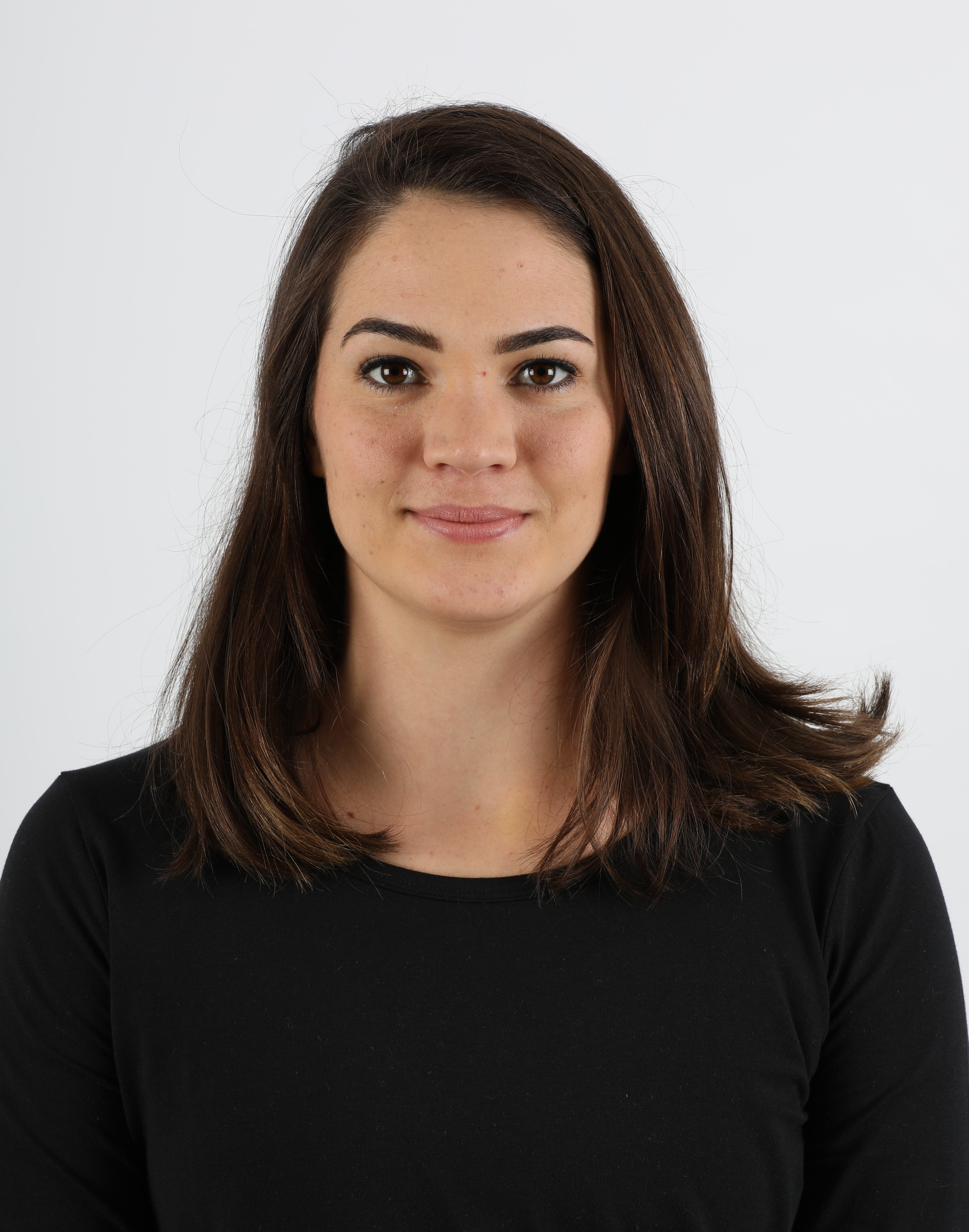
- Britcher in 2018

Personal information
- Nationality: American
- Born: March 21, 1994 (age 32) Baltimore, Maryland, U.S.
- Height: 5 ft 10.5 in (179 cm)
- Weight: 157 lb (71 kg)

Sport
- Country: United States
- Sport: Luge
- Event: Singles
Medal record
Women's luge
Representing the United States
World Championships
Silver medal – second place	2024 Altenberg	Team relay
Bronze medal – third place	2020 Sochi	Team relay

Summer Britcher (born March 21, 1994) is an American luger who earned a place on the Olympic team to compete at the 2014 Winter Olympics. She was the youngest woman on the U.S. Olympic Luge team in Sochi.

== Career ==
Britcher is the daughter of Carrie Britcher and Baltimore City Fire Department Battalion Chief William Britcher. She first became involved in luge at age 11, when she spoke to Gordy Sheer of USA Luge at a promotional/scouting event called the Luge Challenge at the Ski Liberty in Pennsylvania. Sheer suggested she go to Lake Placid for a try-out. Britcher later moved to Lake Placid to train. Britcher attended Susquehannock High School in Glen Rock, Pennsylvania, where she played on the soccer and tennis teams. She graduated from high school in 2012.

Britcher won a gold medal in the team relay at the 2012 Youth Winter Olympics. She placed fifth place in the girls' individual event at those Games. Britcher placed first in the 2013 U.S. Junior National Championship.

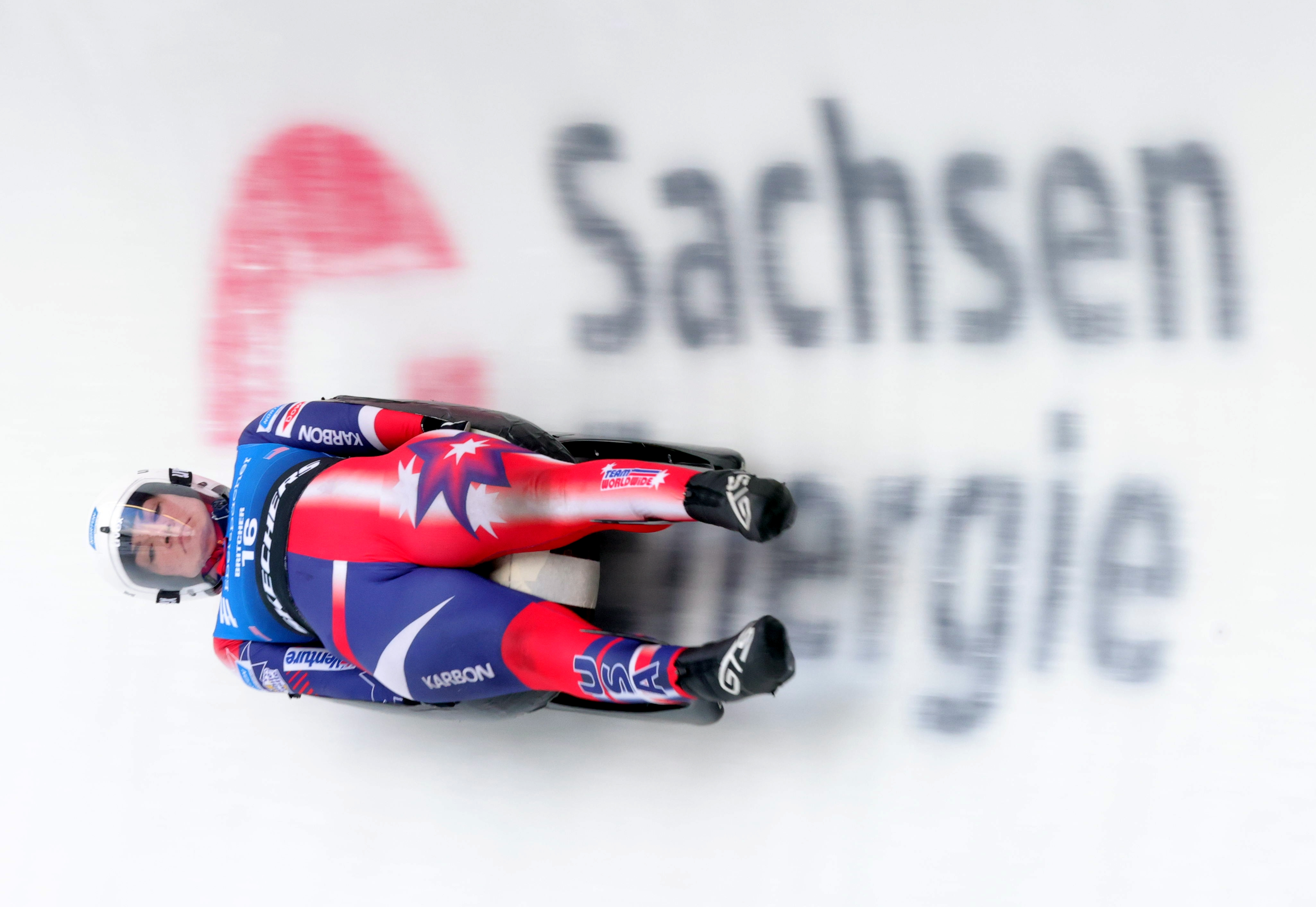
Britcher competing at the 2024 FIL World Luge Championships

She competed at the 2024 FIL World Luge Championships and won a silver medal in the team relay.
