= Kimberley McRae =

Canadian luger

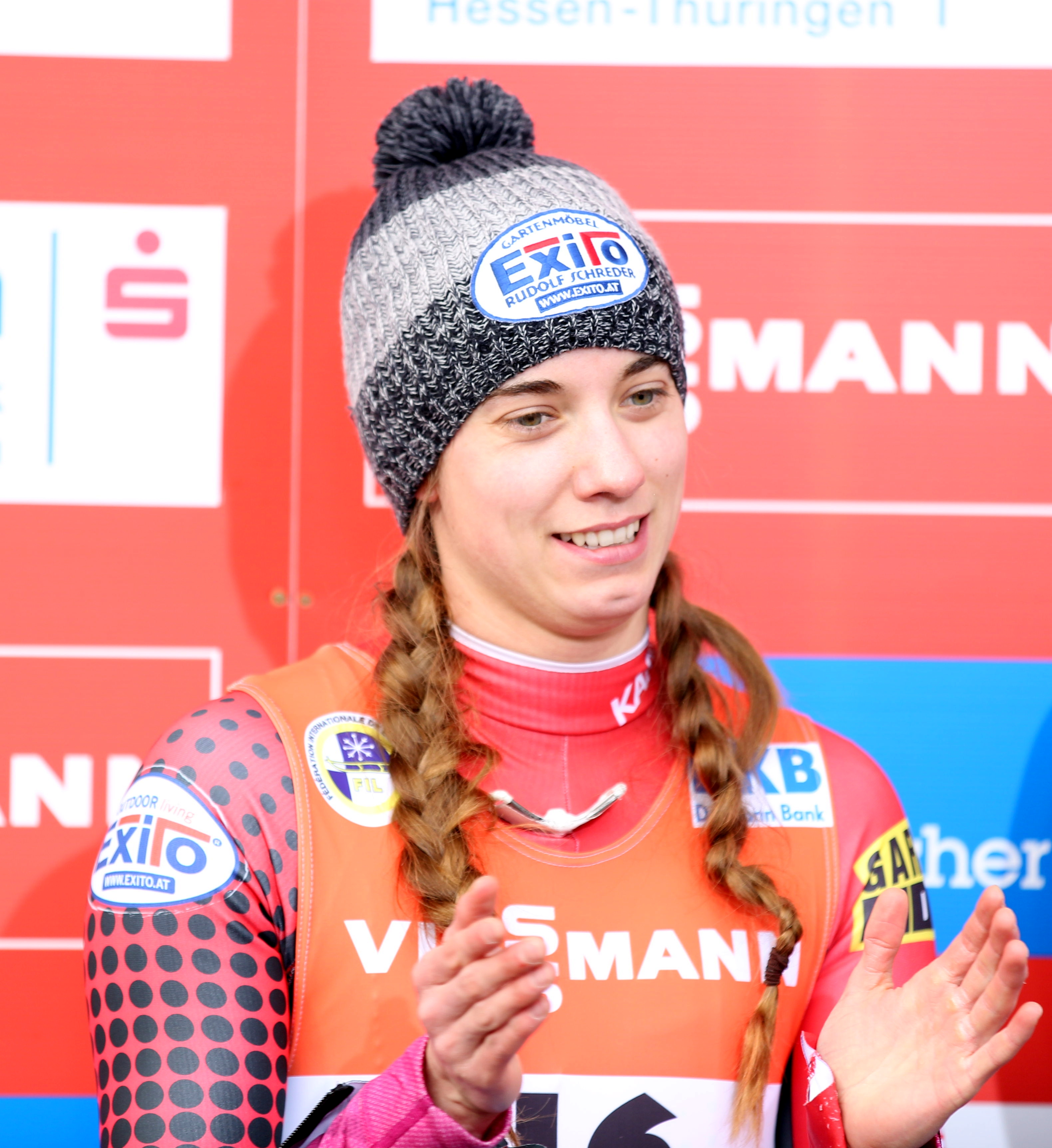
- McRae in 2017

Personal information
- Born: May 24, 1992 (age 34) Victoria, British Columbia, Canada

Sport
- Country: Canada
- Sport: Luge
Medal record
World Championships
Bronze medal – third place	2017 Igls	Singles

Kimberley McRae (born May 24, 1992) is a Canadian luger who has competed since 2011 on the Senior FIL World Cup Circuit McRae competed for Canada at the 2014 Winter Olympics in Sochi, Russia and at the 2018 Winter Olympics in PyeongChang, South Korea.
