= Oberhof bobsleigh, luge, and skeleton track =

Sports venue in Oberhof, Germany

Coordinates: 50.713°N 10.709°E

Track map

The Oberhof bobsleigh, luge, and skeleton track (sponsored name since 2020: LOTTO Thüringen Eisarena Oberhof) is a venue used for bobsled, luge and skeleton located in Oberhof, Germany.

== History ==
Oberhof had been the home of sledding activities since 1905, mostly bobsleigh. In 1931, the facility hosted the first ever FIBT World Championships in the two-man bobsleigh event won by the two-man German team of Hanns Killian and Sebastian Huber. After World War II, Oberhof was partitioned into East Germany. Following the successes of the East Germans at the FIL World Luge Championships during the 1960s with Thomas Köhler (men's singles world champion in 1962 and 1967, men's doubles world champion in 1965 and 1967), Ilse Geisler (women's singles world champion in 1962 and 1963), Ortrun Enderlein (women's singles world champion in 1965 and 1967), Petra Tierlich (women's singles world champion in 1969, Wolfgang Scheidel (men's doubles world champion in 1965), and Klaus Bonsack (men's doubles world champion in 1967), the East German government decided it was time to construct a permanent, artificially refrigerated reinforced concrete track for year-round training and usage. In 1966, East Germany was awarded the FIL World Luge Championships in Friedrichroda (misspelled as Friedrichsroda), but the event was cancelled. The success of the first permanent bobsleigh, luge, and skeleton track in Königssee, West Germany, completed in 1968 and first used for the world luge championships the following year, also played a factor. In 1969, it was decided to construct a permanent facility in Oberhof. The track was completed in 1971 with a World Cup test taking place the following year. Since then the track has hosted World Cup events, mostly in luge though it has hosted events in bobsleigh (1974 in two-man) and skeleton (1993).

== Renovations ==
Oberhof has undergone four track renovations, the first in 1996 where it was closed from April to October for a total reconstruction, a second in 2002 when a new ammonia refrigeration system was installed and turn 14 was modified for safety reasons, and a third in 2006 when new start houses were built for both men and women, and turn 7's profile was modified for safety reasons. The cost of the 2016 renovation was €4 million. The track was again renovated in 2020 with improvements to the roof as well as redesign of many of the track curves and improvements to the starts and start houses.

== Statistics ==
Overall track length is 1354.5 meters. The venue includes a vertical drop of 96.37 meters from start to finish.

Physical statistics
Sport	Length (meters)	Turns
Men's singles luge, men's skeleton, two-man bobsleigh	1069.70	14
Women's luge and skeleton - women's singles and men's and women's doubles	945.60	11
Junior's luge and skeleton	665.40	7

The only named curves are the "S-Kombination" (German for "S Combination") which are turns eight through eleven and the "Zielkurve" (German for "Finish Curve") is turn fourteen, a Kreisel (or circular) curve.

Track records
Sport	Record	Nation - athlete(s)	Date	Time (seconds)
Bobsleigh two-man	Track	East Germany - Wolfgang Hoppe & Bogdan Musioł	1988	44.62
Luge - men's singles	Start	David Möller - Germany	27 January 2008	8.199
Luge - men's singles	Track	Felix Loch - Germany	27 January 2008	44.996
Luge - women's singles	Start	Natalie Geisenberger - Germany	25 January 2008	7.995
Luge - women's singles	Track	Tatjana Hüfner - Germany	16 January 2010	42.920
Luge - men's doubles	Start	Germany - Tobias Wendl & Tobias Arlt	16 January 2010	7.755
Luge - men's doubles	Track	Germany - André Florschütz & Torsten Wustlich	16 January 2010	42.717

== Championships hosted ==
- FIL European Luge Championships: 1979, 1998, 2004 and 2013.
- FIL World Luge Championships: 1973, 1985, 2008.
