= 2018–19 FIS Cross-Country Continental Cup =

Discipline	Men	Women
Alpen Cup	(France) Valentin Chauvin	(Germany) Antonia Fräbel
Australia/New Zealand Cup	(Australia) Phillip Bellingham	(Australia) Katerina Paul
Balkan Cup	(Bosnia and Herzegovina) Strahinja Erić	(Croatia) Vedrana Malec
Eastern Europe Cup	(Russia) Ermil Vokuev	(Russia) Olga Zareva
Far East Cup	(Japan) Hikari Fujinoki	(Japan) Yukari Tanaka
Nor-Am Cup	(Canada) Philippe Boucher	(Canada) Katherine Stewart-Jones
Scandinavian Cup	(Norway) Mattis Stenshagen	(Norway) Anne Kjersti Kalvå
Slavic Cup	(Slovakia) Ján Koristek	(Poland) Izabela Marcisz
US SuperTour	(United States) Kyle Bratrud	(United States) Julia Kern

Competition

The 2018–19 FIS Cross-Country Continental Cup (COC) was a season of the FIS Cross-Country Continental Cup, a series of second-level cross-country skiing competitions arranged by the International Ski Federation (FIS).

The 2018–19 Continental Cup contained nine different series of geographically restricted competitions; five in Europe, two in North America and one each from Asia and Oceania.

== Winners ==
The overall winners from the 2018–19 season's Continental Cups were rewarded a right to start in the first period in the following 2019–20 World Cup season.

Cup	Abbr.	Men			Women		
Cup	Abbr.	Winner	Second	Third	Winner	Second	Third
Alpen Cup (or OPA Cup)	OPA	(France) Valentin Chauvin	(France) Jean Tiberghien	(Italy) Simone Daprà	(Germany) Antonia Fräbel	(Switzerland) Lydia Hiernickel	(Italy) Ilaria Debertolis
Australia/New Zealand Cup	ANC	(Australia) Philip Bellingham	(Australia) Callum Watson	(Australia) Mark Pollock	(Australia) Katerina Paul	(Australia) Casey Wright	(Australia) Emily Champion (Australia) Ella Jackson
Balkan Cup	BC	(Bosnia and Herzegovina) Strahinja Erić	(Croatia) Edi Dadić	(Bosnia and Herzegovina) Stefan Anić	(Croatia) Vedrana Malec	(Bosnia and Herzegovina) Sanja Kusmuk	(Serbia) Anja Ilić
Eastern Europe Cup	EEC	(Russia) Ermil Vokuev	(Russia) Ilia Semikov	(Russia) Ilia Poroshkin	(Russia) Olga Zareva	(Russia) Alisa Zhambalova	(Russia) Natalya Matveyeva
Far East Cup	FEC	(Japan) Hikari Fujinoki	(Japan) Nobuhito Kashiwabara	(Japan) Tomoki Sato	(Japan) Yukari Tanaka	(Japan) Miki Kodama	(Japan) Kozue Takizawa
Nor-Am Cup	NAC	(Canada) Philippe Boucher	(Canada) Alexis Dumas	(Canada) Julien Locke	(Canada) Katherine Stewart-Jones	(Canada) Dahria Beatty	(Canada) Zoe Williams
Scandinavian Cup	SCAN	(Norway) Mattis Stenshagen	(Norway) Daniel Stock	(Norway) Harald Østberg Amundsen	(Norway) Anne Kjersti Kalvå	(Sweden) Johanna Hagström	(Sweden) Moa Lundgren
Slavic Cup	SC	(Slovakia) Ján Koristek	(Poland) Dominik Bury	(Poland) Paweł Klisz	(Poland) Izabela Marcisz	(Poland) Eliza Rucka	(Poland) Agata Warło
US SuperTour	UST	(United States) Kyle Bratrud	(United States) Benjamin Saxton	(United States) David Norris	(United States) Julia Kern	(United States) Kaitlynn Miller	(Australia) Jessica Yeaton
