= FIS Cross-Country Slavic Cup =

Series of cross-country skiing event in Europe

- Genre: Cross-country skiing
- Date: Northern wintertime season
- Begins: November
- Ends: March
- Locations: Hungary; Poland; Slovakia
- Inaugurated: 2005
- Organiser: International Ski Federation

The FIS Cross-Country Slavic Cup is a series of cross-country skiing events arranged by the International Ski Federation (FIS). It is one of the nine FIS Cross-Country Continental Cups, a second-level competition ranked below the World Cup. The Slavic Cup is open for competitors from all nations, but are mainly a competition for skiers from three nations; Hungary, Poland and Slovakia.

The Slavic Cup has been held since 2005 and has been a part of the Cross-Country Continental Cup since then.

== World Cup qualification ==
In the end of certain periods, the overall leaders for both genders receive a place in the World Cup in the following period. The overall winners of the season receive a place in the World Cup in the beginning of the following season.

== Overall winners ==
=== Men ===
Season	Winner	Second	Third
2007–08	(Poland) Mariusz Michałek (1)	(Czech Republic) Václav Kupilík	(Czech Republic) Jan Rykr
2008–09	(Poland) Mariusz Michałek (2)	(Czech Republic) Petr Novák	(Czech Republic) Václav Kupilík
2009–10	(Poland) Mariusz Michałek (3)	(Czech Republic) Jan Rykr	(Poland) Krzysztof Stec
2010–11	(Slovakia) Peter Mlynár (1)	(Poland) Maciej Staręga	(Poland) Jan Antolec
2011–12	(Czech Republic) Aleš Razým	(Poland) Maciej Staręga	(Poland) Jan Antolec
2012–13	(Czech Republic) Jiří Horčička	(Czech Republic) Ondřej Horyna	(Poland) Jan Antolec
2013–14	(Czech Republic) Jakub Gräf	(Czech Republic) Jacob Kordutch	(Czech Republic) Ondřej Horyna
2014–15	(Poland) Mateusz Chowaniak	(Poland) Paweł Klisz	(Czech Republic) Jacob Tony Kordac
2015–16	(Slovakia) Miroslav Šulek	(Slovakia) Peter Mlynár	(Slovakia) Andrej Segeč
2016–17	(Czech Republic) Dušan Kožíšek	(Czech Republic) Adam Fellner	(Czech Republic) Luděk Šeller
2017–18	(Slovakia) Peter Mlynár (2)	(Poland) Mateusz Haratyk	(Slovakia) Andrej Segeč
2018–19	(Slovakia) Ján Koristek	(Poland) Dominik Bury	(Poland) Paweł Klisz
2019–20	(Poland) Mateusz Haratyk	(Poland) Kacper Antolec	(Slovakia) Peter Mlynár
2020–21	(Czech Republic) Petr Knop	(Romania) Paul Constantin Pepene	(Romania) Petrică Hogiu

=== Women ===
Season	Winner	Second	Third
2007–08	(Poland) Justyna Kowalczyk	(Czech Republic) Klara Moravcová	(Czech Republic) Eva Skalníková
2008–09	(Czech Republic) Klára Moravcová	(Czech Republic) Eva Skalníková	(Slovakia) Kamila Rajdlová
2009–10	(Slovakia) Katarína Garajová	(Czech Republic) Martina Chrástková	(Czech Republic) Klára Moravcová
2010–11	(Poland) Justyna Mordarska	(Poland) Ewelina Marcisz	(Slovakia) Lucia Klimková
2011–12	(Poland) Agnieszka Szymańczak	(Poland) Anna Staręga	(Poland) Justyna Mordarska
2012–13	(Slovakia) Daniela Kotschová	(Poland) Agnieszka Szymańczak	(Poland) Martyna Galewicz
2013–14	(Czech Republic) Sandra Schützová	(Czech Republic) Eliška Hájková	(Czech Republic) Klara Moravcova
2014–15	(Poland) Magdalena Kozielska	(Czech Republic) Sandra Schuetzová	(Slovakia) Barbora Klementová
2015–16	(Slovakia) Barbora Klementová	(Poland) Marcela Marcisz	(Poland) Martyna Galewicz
2016–17	(Poland) Urszula Łętocha	(Czech Republic) Anna Sixtová	(Slovakia) Eva Segečová
2017–18	(Poland) Eliza Rucka	(Poland) Urszula Łętocha	(Slovakia) Alena Procházková
2018–19	(Poland) Izabela Marcisz	(Poland) Eliza Rucka	(Poland) Agata Warło
2019–20	(Poland) Magdalena Kobielusz	(Slovakia) Barbora Klementová	(Poland) Karolina Kaleta (Slovakia) Kristina Sivokova
2020–21	(Poland) Karolina Kaleta	(Slovakia) Alena Procházková	(Latvia) Patricija Eiduka
