= 2018–19 FIS Cross-Country Slavic Cup =

Discipline	Men	Women
Overall	(Slovakia) Ján Koristek	(Poland) Izabela Marcisz

Competition
Locations	5 venues	5 venues
Individual	16 events	16 events

The 2018–19 Slavic Cup was a season of the FIS Cross-Country Slavic Cup, a Continental Cup season in cross-country skiing for men and women. The season began on 15 December 2018 in Štrbské Pleso, Slovakia and concluded on 27 February 2019 in Kremnica, Slovakia.

== Calendar ==
=== Men ===
Key: C – Classic / F – Freestyle
Period	Race	Date	Place	Discipline	Winner	Second	Third	Ref.
I	1	15 December 2018	(Slovakia) Štrbské Pleso	10 km C	(Slovakia) Peter Mlynár	(Poland) Jan Antolec	(Slovakia) Ján Koristek	
I	2	16 December 2018	(Slovakia) Štrbské Pleso	Sprint F	(Poland) Paweł Klisz	(Poland) Jan Antolec	(Slovakia) Ján Koristek	
II	3	29 December 2018	(Slovakia) Štrbské Pleso	10 km F	(Slovakia) Ján Koristek	(Poland) Jan Antolec	(Poland) Paweł Klisz	
II	4	30 December 2018	(Slovakia) Štrbské Pleso	10 km C	(Slovakia) Ján Koristek	(Poland) Jan Antolec	(Slovakia) Andrej Segeč	
III	5	2 February 2019	(Poland) Zakopane	10 km C	(Slovakia) Ján Koristek	(Poland) Michal Skowron	(Poland) Robert Bugara	
III	6	3 February 2019	(Poland) Zakopane	15 km F	(Slovakia) Ján Koristek	(Poland) Łukasz Kunc	(Poland) Kacper Antolec	
IV	7	9 March 2019	(Poland) Wisła	Sprint C	(Poland) Maciej Starega	(Poland) Dominik Bury	(Poland) Kamil Bury	
IV	8	10 March 2019	(Poland) Wisła	15 km F	(Poland) Dominik Bury	(Poland) Mariusz Michałek	(Poland) Krzysztof Małkiński	
IV	9	23 March 2019	(Slovakia) Kremnica	10 km C	(Poland) Dominik Bury	(Poland) Maciej Starega	(Poland) Mateusz Haratyk	
IV	10	24 March 2019	(Slovakia) Kremnica	15 km F Mass Start	(Poland) Dominik Bury	(Poland) Paweł Klisz	(Poland) Mateusz Haratyk	

=== Women ===
Key: C – Classic / F – Freestyle
Period	Race	Date	Place	Discipline	Winner	Second	Third	Ref.
I	1	15 December 2018	(Slovakia) Štrbské Pleso	7.5 km C	(Poland) Justyna Kowalczyk	(Poland) Eliza Rucka	(Poland) Agata Warło	
I	2	16 December 2018	(Slovakia) Štrbské Pleso	Sprint F	(Poland) Eliza Rucka	(Slovakia) Barbora Klementová	(Poland) Weronika Kaleta	
II	3	29 December 2018	(Slovakia) Štrbské Pleso	5 km F	(Poland) Izabela Marcisz	(Belarus) Ina Lukonina	(Slovakia) Barbora Klementová	
II	4	30 December 2018	(Slovakia) Štrbské Pleso	5 km C	(Poland) Justyna Kowalczyk	(Poland) Izabela Marcisz	(Poland) Monika Skinder	
III	5	2 February 2019	(Poland) Zakopane	5 km C	(Poland) Justyna Kowalczyk	(Poland) Izabela Marcisz	(Poland) Urszula Łętocha	
III	6	3 February 2019	(Poland) Zakopane	10 km F	(Poland) Izabela Marcisz	(Poland) Urszula Łętocha	(Poland) Weronika Kaleta	
IV	7	9 March 2019	(Poland) Wisła	Sprint C	(Slovakia) Alena Procházková	(Poland) Monika Skinder	(Poland) Izabela Marcisz	
IV	8	10 March 2019	(Poland) Wisła	10 km F	(Poland) Izabela Marcisz	(Slovakia) Alena Procházková	(Poland) Magdalena Kobielusz	
IV	9	23 March 2019	(Slovakia) Kremnica	5 km C	(Poland) Justyna Kowalczyk	(Poland) Izabela Marcisz	(Poland) Eliza Rucka	
IV	10	24 March 2019	(Slovakia) Kremnica	10 km F Mass Start	(Poland) Izabela Marcisz	(Slovakia) Alena Procházková	(Poland) Urszula Łętocha	

== Overall standings ==
=== Men's overall standings ===
Rank		Points
1	(Slovakia) Ján Koristek	620
2	(Poland) Dominik Bury	380
3	(Poland) Paweł Klisz	359
4	(Poland) Kacper Antolec	337
5	(Poland) Jan Antolec	320
6	(Poland) Michal Skowron	269
7	(Poland) Krzysztof Małkiński	246
8	(Poland) Maciej Starega	225
9	(Poland) Robert Bugara	216
10	(Poland) Wiktor Czaja	188

=== Women's overall standings ===
Rank		Points
1	(Poland) Izabela Marcisz	700
2	(Poland) Eliza Rucka	466
3	(Poland) Agata Warło	447
4	(Poland) Justyna Kowalczyk	400
5	(Poland) Magdalena Kobielusz	395
6	(Poland) Weronika Kaleta	370
7	(Poland) Monika Skinder	348
8	(Slovakia) Alena Procházková	310
9	(Slovakia) Barbora Klementová	294
10	(Poland) Klaudia Kolodziej	251
