= Poland at the 2014 Winter Olympics =

- IOC code: POL
- NOC: Polish Olympic Committee
- Website: www.pkol.pl (in Polish)

in Sochi
- Competitors: 59 in 11 sports
- Flag bearers: Dawid Kupczyk (opening); Zbigniew Bródka (closing)
- Medals Ranked 11th: Gold 4 Silver 1 Bronze 1 Total 6

Winter Olympics appearances (overview)
- 1924; 1928; 1932; 1936; 1948; 1952; 1956; 1960; 1964; 1968; 1972; 1976; 1980; 1984; 1988; 1992; 1994; 1998; 2002; 2006; 2010; 2014; 2018; 2022; 2026

Poland competed at the 2014 Winter Olympics in Sochi, Russia, from 7 to 23 February 2014. The Polish team consisted of 59 athletes in 11 sports, which was the largest ever Polish team till then, surpassing the 56 athletes that competed in 1972. With 4 gold medals won (and 6 medals overall), this was the most successful Winter Olympics for Poland in its history.

== Medalists ==
Medal	Name	Sport	Event	Date
Gold	Kamil Stoch	Ski jumping	Men's normal hill individual	9 February
Gold	Justyna Kowalczyk	Cross-country skiing	Women's 10 kilometre classical	13 February
Gold	Zbigniew Bródka	Speed skating	Men's 1500 metres	15 February
Gold	Kamil Stoch	Ski jumping	Men's large hill individual	15 February
Silver	Katarzyna Bachleda-Curuś; Natalia Czerwonka; Luiza Złotkowska; Katarzyna Woźniak	Speed skating	Women's team pursuit	22 February
Bronze	Zbigniew Bródka; Konrad Niedźwiedzki; Jan Szymański	Speed skating	Men's team pursuit	22 February

== Alpine skiing ==
According to the quota allocation released on 20 January 2014, Poland qualified six athletes.

Men

Athlete	Event	Run 1		Run 2		Total	
Athlete	Event	Time	Rank	Time	Rank	Time	Rank
Maciej Bydliński	Super-G	—				1:22.51	38
Maciej Bydliński	Slalom	DNF					
Maciej Bydliński	Combined	1:57.36	35	DNF			
Mateusz Garniewicz	Slalom	54.93	53	DNF			
Michał Jasiczek	Slalom	52.88	45	1:00.60	22	1:53.48	23

Women

Athlete	Event	Run 1		Run 2		Total	
Athlete	Event	Time	Rank	Time	Rank	Time	Rank
Karolina Chrapek	Downhill	—				1:46.90	33
Karolina Chrapek	Super-G	—				DNF	
Karolina Chrapek	Giant slalom	1:23.89	36	1:21.92	32	2:45.81	33
Karolina Chrapek	Slalom	DNF					
Karolina Chrapek	Combined	1:47.28	28	54.52	17	2:41.80	17
Maryna Gąsienica-Daniel	Super-G	—				DNF	
Maryna Gąsienica-Daniel	Giant slalom	1:23.18	35	1:22.32	34	2:45.50	32
Maryna Gąsienica-Daniel	Slalom	DNF					
Aleksandra Kluś	Slalom	DNF					

== Biathlon ==
Based on their performance at the 2012 and 2013 Biathlon World Championships, Poland qualified 5 men and 5 women.

Men

Athlete	Event	Time	Misses	Rank
Grzegorz Guzik	Sprint	29:17.2	5 (4+1)	85
Grzegorz Guzik	Individual	1:00:20.7	4 (1+2+0+1)	86
Krzysztof Pływaczyk	Sprint	27:02.3	1 (0+1)	64
Krzysztof Pływaczyk	Individual	58:12.5	5 (3+0+0+1)	77
Rafał Lepel	Sprint	29:25.8	2 (1+1)	86
Łukasz Słonina	Individual	1:00:29.5	3 (0+2+0+1)	87
Łukasz Szczurek	Sprint	27:57.2	2 (2+0)	77
Łukasz Szczurek	Individual	55:18.6	1 (0+0+1+0)	51
Rafał Lepel; Krzysztof Pływaczyk; Łukasz Słonina; Łukasz Szczurek	Team relay	LAP	14 (2+12)	19

Women

Athlete	Event	Time	Misses	Rank
Magdalena Gwizdoń	Sprint	22:51.2	2 (1+1)	40
Magdalena Gwizdoń	Pursuit	33:14.3	2 (1+0+1+0)	38
Magdalena Gwizdoń	Individual	48:44.1	2 (1+1+0+0)	32
Monika Hojnisz	Sprint	21:55.1	0 (0+0)	21
Monika Hojnisz	Pursuit	31:14.0	2 (0+0+0+2)	19
Monika Hojnisz	Individual	46:44.3	2 (1+0+0+1)	12
Monika Hojnisz	Mass start	36:20.5	0 (0+0+0+0)	5
Weronika Nowakowska-Ziemniak	Sprint	21:37.6	1 (1+0)	7
Weronika Nowakowska-Ziemniak	Pursuit	31:25.4	2 (1+0+1+0)	20
Weronika Nowakowska-Ziemniak	Individual	48:35.2	4 (1+1+2+0)	31
Weronika Nowakowska-Ziemniak	Mass start	37:35.9	4 (1+0+2+1)	19
Krystyna Pałka	Sprint	22:27.8	1 (1+0)	33
Krystyna Pałka	Pursuit	32:56.3	3 (1+0+1+1)	34
Krystyna Pałka	Individual	46:27.3	0 (0+0+0+0)	10
Krystyna Pałka	Mass start	37:33.9	2 (1+0+1+0)	18
Magdalena Gwizdoń; Monika Hojnisz; Weronika Nowakowska-Ziemniak; Krystyna Pałka	Team relay	1:12:34.4	12 (4+8)	10

Mixed

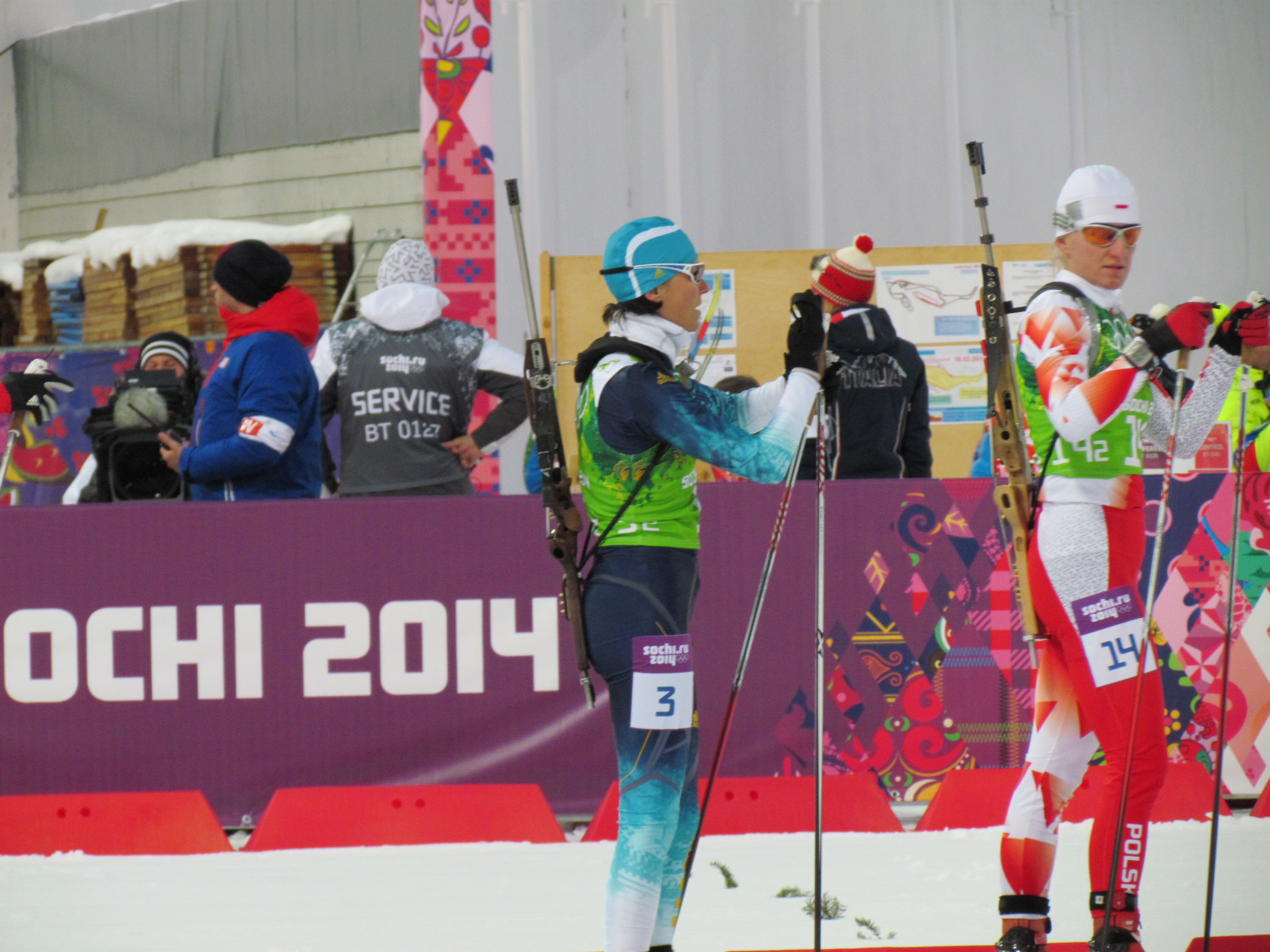
Magdalena Gwizdoń (right)

Athlete	Event	Time	Misses	Rank
Krystyna Pałka; Magdalena Gwizdoń; Łukasz Szczurek; Krzysztof Pływaczyk	Team relay	1:13:36.0	6 (0+6)	13

== Bobsleigh ==
Poland had two sleds in qualification position.

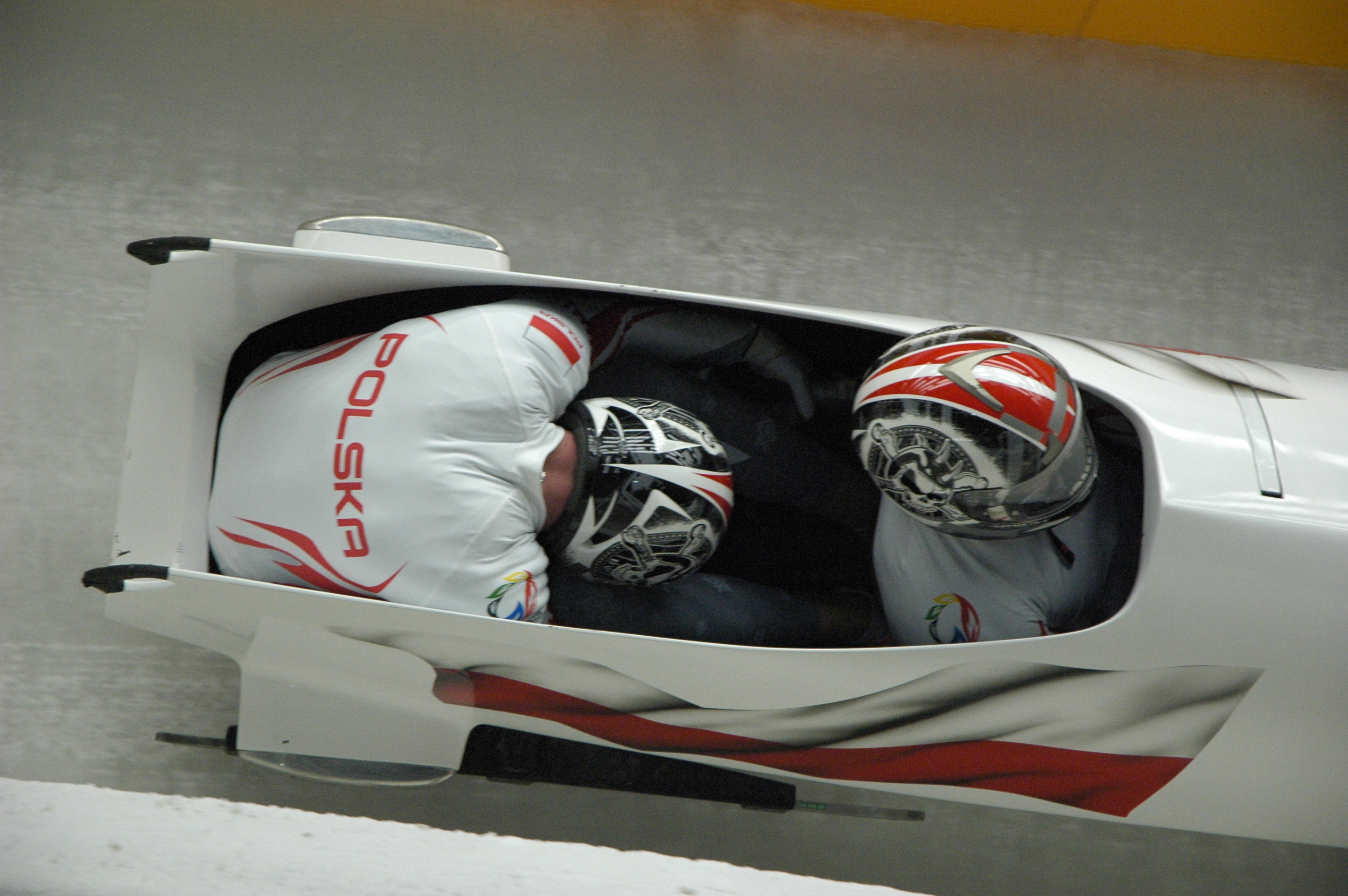
Polish two-man sled

Athlete	Event	Run 1		Run 2		Run 3		Run 4		Total	
Athlete	Event	Time	Rank	Time	Rank	Time	Rank	Time	Rank	Time	Rank
Dawid Kupczyk*; Paweł Mróz	Two-man	57.90	26	58.07	28	57.98	27	Did not advance		2:53.95	27
Dawid Kupczyk*; Paweł Mróz; Michał Kasperowicz; Daniel Zalewski	Four-man	56.57	28	56.45	27	56.47	25	Did not advance		DSQ	DSQ

* – Denotes the driver of each sled

The Four Man Bobsleigh Sled was disqualified.

== Cross-country skiing ==
According to the quota allocation released on 20 January 2014, eight athletes from Poland qualified.

Distance
Men

Athlete	Event	Classical		Freestyle		Final		
Athlete	Event	Time	Rank	Time	Rank	Time	Deficit	Rank
Jan Antolec	30 km skiathlon	41:32.2	68	36:12.8	57	1:18:18.8	+10:03.4	64
Sebastian Gazurek	15 km classical	—				43:06.7	+4:37.0	55
Maciej Kreczmer	15 km classical	—				40:58.7	+2:29.0	29
Maciej Kreczmer	30 km skiathlon	37:07.5	35	34:05.5	40	1:11:47.6	+3:32.2	39
Maciej Staręga	15 km classical	—				44:07.1	+5:37.4	66
Paweł Klisz	15 km classical	—				43:51.6	+5:21.9	64
Paweł Klisz	30 km skiathlon	40:09.3	61	36:39.5	62	1:17:18.5	+9:03.1	61
Maciej Kreczmer; Sebastian Gazurek; Maciej Staręga; Jan Antolec	4×10 km relay	—				1:35:46.5	+7:04.5	15

Women

Athlete	Event	Classical		Freestyle		Final		
Athlete	Event	Time	Rank	Time	Rank	Time	Deficit	Rank
Sylwia Jaśkowiec	30 km freestyle	—				1:15:47.6	+4:42.4	33
Justyna Kowalczyk	10 km classical	—				28:17.8	0.0	1st place, gold medalist(s)
Justyna Kowalczyk	15 km skiathlon	19:12.9	6	19:37.2	10	39:29.7	+56.1	6
Justyna Kowalczyk	30 km freestyle	—				DNF		
Kornelia Kubińska	10 km classical	—				30:43.5	+2:25.7	24
Kornelia Kubińska	15 km skiathlon	20:23.5	39	20:20.7	31	41:19.4	+2:45.8	34
Kornelia Kubińska	30 km freestyle	—				1:19:57.7	+8:52.5	43
Paulina Maciuszek	10 km classical	—				31:25.8	+3:08.0	39
Paulina Maciuszek	15 km skiathlon	20:15.0	32	20:09.2	25	41:00.6	+2:27.0	29
Paulina Maciuszek	30 km freestyle	—				1:18:44.7	+7:39.5	41
Agnieszka Szymańczak	15 km skiathlon	20:42.9	47	21:03.1	45	42:22.3	+3:48.7	45
Kornelia Kubińska; Justyna Kowalczyk; Sylwia Jaśkowiec; Paulina Maciuszek	4×5 km relay	—				54:38.9	+1:36.2	6

Sprint
Men

Athlete	Event	Qualification		Quarterfinal		Semifinal		Final	
Athlete	Event	Time	Rank	Time	Rank	Time	Rank	Time	Rank
Sebastian Gazurek	Sprint	3:46.12	57	Did not advance					
Maciej Staręga	Sprint	3:51.84	67	Did not advance					
Maciej Kreczmer; Maciej Staręga	Team sprint	—				23:53.09	8	Did not advance	

Women

Athlete	Event	Qualification		Quarterfinal		Semifinal		Final	
Athlete	Event	Time	Rank	Time	Rank	Time	Rank	Time	Rank
Sylwia Jaśkowiec	Sprint	3:01.21	63	Did not advance					
Agnieszka Szymańczak	Sprint	2:43.06	41	Did not advance					
Sylwia Jaśkowiec; Justyna Kowalczyk	Team sprint	—				16:49.43	2 Q	16:35.54	5

== Freestyle skiing ==
According to the quota allocation released on 20 January 2014, one athlete from Poland qualified.

Ski cross

Athlete	Event	Seeding		Round of 16	Quarterfinal	Semifinal	Final	
Athlete	Event	Time	Rank	Position	Position	Position	Position	Rank
Karolina Riemen-Żerebecka	Women's ski cross	1:24.86	18	2 Q	DNF	Did not advance		15

== Luge ==
Poland achieved the following quota places:

Athlete	Event	Run 1		Run 2		Run 3		Run 4		Total	
Athlete	Event	Time	Rank	Time	Rank	Time	Rank	Time	Rank	Time	Rank
Maciej Kurowski	Men's singles	53.234	25	52.988	24	52.637	23	52.538	20	3:31.397	23
Karol Mikrut; Patryk Poręba	Men's doubles	51.010	17	51.170	15	—				1:42.180	15
Ewa Kuls	Women's singles	51.362	22	51.031	18	51.424	21	51.550	22	3:25.367	21
Natalia Wojtuściszyn	Women's singles	51.138	16	51.168	22	51.141	19	51.199	18	3:24.646	16
Maciej Kurowski; Karol Mikrut; Patryk Poręba; Natalia Wojtuściszyn	Team relay	54.937	7	56.737	9	58.079	10	—		2:49.753	8

== Nordic combined ==
According to the quota allocation released on 20 January 2014, Poland qualified one athlete.

Athlete	Event	Ski jumping			Cross-country		Total	
Athlete	Event	Distance	Points	Rank	Time	Rank	Time	Rank
Adam Cieślar	Normal hill/10 km	90.5	104.1	42	25:18.7	35	27:08.7	39
Adam Cieślar	Large hill/10 km	122.0	97.8	32	24:10.8	36	26:15.8	37

== Short track speed skating ==
Poland qualified one skater for the women's 500 m and 1000 m events for the Olympics during the two World Cup events in November 2013.

Women

Athlete	Event	Heat		Quarterfinal		Semifinal		Final	
Athlete	Event	Time	Rank	Time	Rank	Time	Rank	Time	Rank
Patrycja Maliszewska	500 m	44.154	3	Did not advance					18
Patrycja Maliszewska	1000 m	1:32.975	2 Q	1:32.376	4	Did not advance			14

Qualification legend: ADV – Advanced due to being impeded by another skater; FA – Qualify to medal round; FB – Qualify to consolation round

== Ski jumping ==
According to the quota allocation released on 20 January 2014, Poland qualified five athletes.

Athlete	Event	Qualification			First round			Final			Total	
Athlete	Event	Distance	Points	Rank	Distance	Points	Rank	Distance	Points	Rank	Points	Rank
Maciej Kot	Men's normal hill	98.5	123.7	5 Q	101.5	131.6	7 Q	98.5	124.2	14	255.8	7
Dawid Kubacki	Men's normal hill	95.5	115.7	13 Q	97.5	118.3	31	Did not advance				
Kamil Stoch	Men's normal hill	BYE			105.5	142.0	1 Q	103.5	134.7	1	278.0	1st place, gold medalist(s)
Jan Ziobro	Men's normal hill	95.0	113.2	22 Q	101.0	130.6	9 Q	99.0	121.8	17	252.4	13
Maciej Kot	Men's large hill	126.0	115.4	9 Q	126.0	125.4	12 Q	123.5	125.0	12	250.4	12
Kamil Stoch	Men's large hill	BYE			139.0	143.4	1 Q	132.5	135.3	4	278.7	1st place, gold medalist(s)
Jan Ziobro	Men's large hill	123.0	109.0	13 Q	128.5	122.1	16 Q	129.5	124.5	13	246.6	15
Piotr Żyła	Men's large hill	118.0	101.3	27 Q	118.0	108.7	34	Did not advance				
Maciej Kot; Piotr Żyła; Jan Ziobro; Kamil Stoch	Men's team large hill	—			513.5	489.2	4 Q	529.0	522.6	1	1011.8	4

== Snowboarding ==
According to the quota allocation released on 20 January 2014, Poland qualified five athletes.

Alpine

Athlete	Event	Qualification		Round of 16	Quarterfinal	Semifinal	Final	
Athlete	Event	Time	Rank	Opposition Time	Opposition Time	Opposition Time	Opposition Time	Rank
Aleksandra Król	Women's giant slalom	DSQ		Did not advance				
Aleksandra Król	Women's slalom	1:07.42	30	Did not advance				
Karolina Sztokfisz	Women's giant slalom	2:08.40	28	Did not advance				
Karolina Sztokfisz	Women's slalom	1:06.01	25	Did not advance				

Freestyle

Athlete	Event	Qualification				Semifinal				Final			
Athlete	Event	Run 1	Run 2	Best	Rank	Run 1	Run 2	Best	Rank	Run 1	Run 2	Best	Rank
Michał Ligocki	Men's halfpipe	4.50	55.00	55.00	16	Did not advance							
Joanna Zając	Women's halfpipe	47.75	39.75	47.75	11	Did not advance							

Qualification Legend: QF – Qualify directly to final; QS – Qualify to semifinal

Snowboard cross

Athlete	Event	Seeding		Round of 16	Quarterfinal	Semifinal	Final	
Athlete	Event	Time	Rank	Position	Position	Position	Position	Rank
Maciej Jodko	Men's snowboard cross	CAN		4	Did not advance			=25
Mateusz Ligocki	Men's snowboard cross	CAN		5	Did not advance			=33

== Speed skating ==
Based on the results from the fall World Cups during the 2013–14 ISU Speed Skating World Cup season, Poland earned the following start quotas:

Men

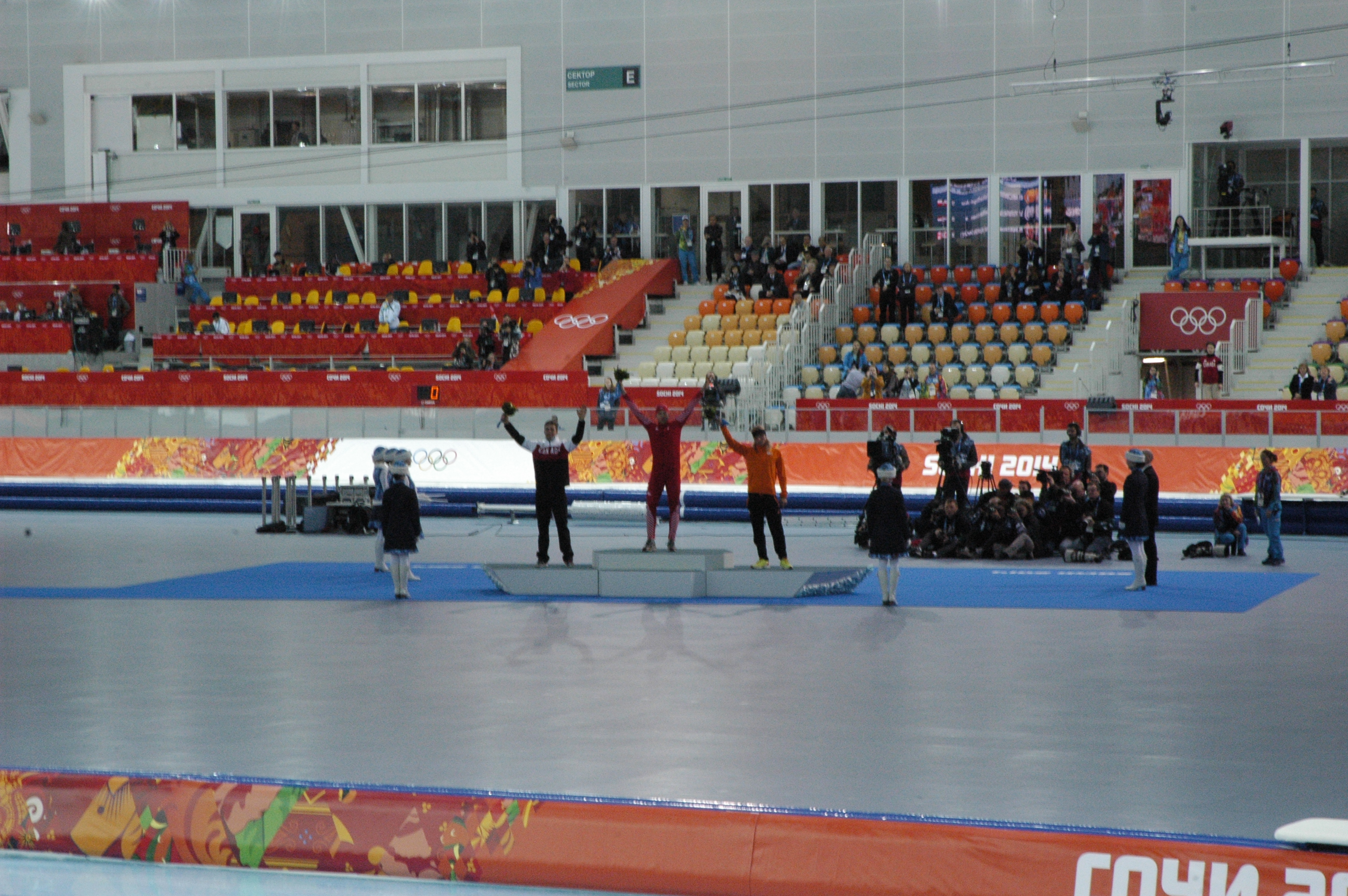
Zbigniew Bródka won gold in the 1500 m

Athlete	Event	Race 1		Race 2		Final	
Athlete	Event	Time	Rank	Time	Rank	Time	Rank
Artur Nogal	500 m	35.83	38	35.66	33	71.49	36
Artur Waś	500 m	35.01	8	35.19	12	70.20	9
Konrad Niedźwiedzki	1000 m	—				1:09.76	16
Zbigniew Bródka	1000 m	—				1:09.66	14
Konrad Niedźwiedzki	1500 m	—				1:47.77	20
Zbigniew Bródka	1500 m	—				1:45.006	1st place, gold medalist(s)
Jan Szymański	1500 m	—				1:46.86	15
Sebastian Druszkiewicz	5000 m	—				6:37.16	23
Jan Szymański	5000 m	—				6:26.35	13
Sebastian Druszkiewicz	10000 m	—				13:45.31	14

Women

Athlete	Event	Final	
Athlete	Event	Time	Rank
Natalia Czerwonka	1000 m	1:17.933	23
Luiza Złotkowska	1000 m	1:18.38	29
Katarzyna Bachleda-Curuś	1500 m	1:57.18	6
Natalia Czerwonka	1500 m	1:58.46	15
Luiza Złotkowska	1500 m	1:58.18	11
Katarzyna Bachleda-Curuś	3000 m	DSQ	
Natalia Czerwonka	3000 m	4:13.26	16
Luiza Złotkowska	3000 m	4:14.19	18
Katarzyna Woźniak	5000 m	7:28.53	15

Team pursuit

Athlete	Event	Quarterfinal	Semifinal	Final	
Athlete	Event	Opposition Time	Opposition Time	Opposition Time	Rank
Zbigniew Bródka; Konrad Niedźwiedzki; Jan Szymański	Men's team pursuit	Norway; W 3:42.78	Netherlands; L 3:52.08	Final B Canada; W 3:41.94	3rd place, bronze medalist(s)
Katarzyna Bachleda-Curuś; Natalia Czerwonka; Luiza Złotkowska; Katarzyna Woźniak	Women's team pursuit	Norway; W 3:02.12	Russia; W 3:00.60	Final A Netherlands; L 3:05.55	2nd place, silver medalist(s)

== See also ==
- Poland at the 2014 Summer Youth Olympics
