= Jozef Petrulák =

Slovak luger

Personal information
- Nationality: Slovak
- Born: 23 August 1994 (age 31) Čadca, Slovakia
- Height: 1.73 m (5 ft 8 in)
- Weight: 70 kg (154 lb)

Sport
- Country: Slovakia
- Sport: Luge
- Event: Doubles

Jozef Petrulák (born 23 August 1994 in Čadca) is a Slovak luger.

Petrulák competed at the 2014 Winter Olympics for Slovakia. In the Doubles he competed with Marián Zemaník, finishing 16th. He was also a part of the Slovak relay team, which finished 10th.

As of September 2014, Petrulák's best Luge World Cup overall finish is 16th in 2013–14.
