= Marián Zemaník =

Slovak luger

Personal information
- Nationality: Slovak
- Born: 12 January 1993 (age 33) Čadca, Slovakia
- Height: 1.86 m (6 ft 1 in)
- Weight: 79 kg (174 lb)

Sport
- Country: Slovakia
- Sport: Luge
- Event: Doubles

Marián Zemaník (born 12 January 1993 in Čadca) is a Slovak luger.

Zemaník competed at the 2014 Winter Olympics for Slovakia. In the Doubles he competed with Jozef Petrulák, finishing 16th. He was also a part of the Slovak relay team, which finished 10th.

As of September 2014, Zemaník's best Luge World Cup overall finish is 16th in 2013–14.
