= Biathlon Junior World Championships 2001 =

Biathlon event in Russia

The 2001 Biathlon Junior World Championships was held in Khanty-Mansiysk, Russia from March 21 to March 26, 2001. There was to be a total of eight competitions: sprint, pursuit, individual, mass start, and relay races for men and women.

== Medal winners ==
=== Junior Women ===
Event:	Gold:	Time	Silver:	Time	Bronze:	Time
12.5 km individual details	Tatiana Moiseeva; Russia	51:20.8 (1+2+1+0)	Dana Plotogea; Romania	52:02.3 (0+0+1+2)	Yulia Makarova; Russia	52:39.7 (0+1+2+0)
7.5 km sprint details	Romy Beer; Germany	29:08.0 (0+0)	Jenny Adler; Germany	29:38.0 (1+2)	Yulia Makarova; Russia	29:55.0 (1+2)
10 km pursuit details	Jenny Adler; Germany	40:48.9 (1+0+1+0)	Romy Beer; Germany	41:27.3 (0+0+0+3)	Lyudmila Ananko; Belarus	42:19.0 (0+0+1+0)
3 × 7.5 km relay details	Russia; Tatiana Moiseeva; Nadezhda Chastina; Yulia Makarova	1:20:52.7 (0+3) (0+1) (1+3) (0+1) (0+2) (0+2)	Czech Republic; Magda Rezlerová; Zdeňka Vejnarová; Klára Moravcová	1:20:58.9 (0+3) (0+2) (0+2) (0+1) (0+0) (0+2)	Germany; Jenny Adler; Michele Volkerath; Romy Beer	1:21:54.1 (0+2) (0+0) (0+0) (0+2) (0+1) (1+3)

=== Junior Men ===
Event:	Gold:	Time	Silver:	Time	Bronze:	Time
15 km individual details	Vitaly Chernychev; Russia	49:37.3 (0+0+1+1)	Sergei Dashkevich; Belarus	51:44.7 (1+1+0+1)	Alexey Soloviev; Russia	52:02.7 (1+1+1+1)
10 km sprint details	Andreas Birnbacher; Germany	31:09.1 (1+1)	Nikolay Kruglov; Russia	31:37.2 (1+2)	Daniel Graf; Germany	31:44.9 (2+1)
12.5 km pursuit details	Andreas Birnbacher; Germany	40:02.5 (0+2+1+2)	Nikolay Kruglov; Russia	40:27.1 (0+0+1+2)	Alexey Soloviev; Russia	40:48.2 (0+0+0+2)
4 × 7.5 km relay details	Germany; Michael Rösch; Kristian Meringer; Daniel Graf; Andreas Birnbacher	1:29:05.9 (0+1) (0+0) (0+3) (0+1) (0+1) (0+2) (0+0) (0+3)	Russia; Vitaly Chernychev; Alexander Zhukov; Alexey Soloviev; Nikolay Kruglov	1:31:47.2 (0+3) (0+2) (0+1) (1+3) (0+1) (2+3) (0+3) (0+2)	Norway; Sveinung Strand; Kent Roger Guttormsen; Dan Kjormo; Tobias Retvik Torgersen	1:33:26.5 (0+2) (0+0) (0+0) (1+3) (2+3) (0+2) (0+2) (0+3)

== Medal table ==
* Host nation (Russia)

Rank	Nation	Gold	Silver	Bronze	Total
1	Germany (GER)	5	2	2	9
2	Russia (RUS)*	3	3	4	10
3	Belarus (BLR)	0	1	1	2
4	Czech Republic (CZE)	0	1	0	1
4	Romania (ROU)	0	1	0	1
6	Norway (NOR)	0	0	1	1
Totals (6 entries)		8	8	8	24
