= FIS Cross-Country Far East Cup =

Series of cross-country skiing event in Asia

Far East Cup
- Genre: Cross-country skiing
- Date: Northern wintertime season
- Begins: November
- Ends: March
- Locations: China; Iran; Japan; Mongolia; South Korea; Chinese Taipei; Uzbekistan
- Inaugurated: 2004
- Organiser: International Ski Federation

The FIS Cross-Country Far East Cup is a series of cross-country skiing events arranged by the International Ski Federation (FIS). The Cup is one of the nine FIS Cross-Country Continental Cups, a series of second-level cross-country skiing competitions ranked below the Cross-Country World Cup. The Far East is open for competitors from all nations, but eight main countries are associated to the Far East Cup, these are; China, Iran, Japan, Mongolia, North Korea, South Korea, Chinese Taipei and Uzbekistan.

The Far East Cup has been held annually since the 2004–05 season.

== World Cup qualification ==
In the end of certain periods, the overall leaders for both genders receive a place in the World Cup in the following period. The overall winners of the season receive a place in the World Cup in the beginning of the following season.

== Overall winners ==
=== Men ===
Season	Winner	Second	Third
2006–07	(Japan) Masaaki Kōzu	(Japan) Tomio Kanamaru	(Japan) Tadashi Yamamuro
2007–08	(Japan) Shohei Honda	(Japan) Tomio Kanamaru	(Japan) Masakazu Aoki
2008–09	(Japan) Tomio Kanamaru	(Japan) Shunsuke Komamura	(Japan) Keishin Yoshida
2009–10	(Japan) Nobu Naruse	(Japan) Keishin Yoshida	(South Korea) Byung-joo Park
2010–11	(Japan) Akira Lenting	(Japan) Kouhei Shimizu	(Japan) Masaya Kimura
2011–12	(Japan) Hiroyuki Miyazawa	(Japan) Nobu Naruse	(Japan) Akira Lenting
2012–13	(Japan) Nobu Naruse (2)	(Japan) Keishin Yoshida	(Japan) Akira Lenting
2013–14	(Japan) Kouhei Shimizu	(Japan) Nobuhito Kashiwabara	(Japan) Akira Lenting
2014–15	(Japan) Kaichi Naruse	(Japan) Nobuhito Kashiwabara	(Japan) Takatsugu Uda
2015–16	(Japan) Akira Lenting (2)	(Japan) Takanori Ebina	(Japan) Hiroyuki Miyazawa
2016–17	(Japan) Nobuhito Kashiwabara	(Japan) Akira Lenting	(Japan) Hikari Fujinoki
2017–18	(Japan) Hiroyuki Miyazawa (2)	(Japan) Naoto Baba	(Japan) Keishin Yoshida
2018–19	(Japan) Hikari Fujinoki	(Japan) Nobuhito Kashiwabara	(Japan) Tomoki Sato
2019–20	(Japan) Hikari Fujinoki (2)	(South Korea) Kim Min-woo	(South Korea) Lee Geon-yong
2020–21	(South Korea) Kim Eun-ho	(South Korea) Lee Geon-yong	(South Korea) Lee Jin-bok

=== Women ===
Season	Winner	Second	Third
2006–07	(Japan) Madoka Natsumi	(Japan) Chizuru Soneta	(Japan) Masako Ishida
2007–08	(Japan) Sumiko Yokoyama	(Japan) Chisa Ōbayashi	(Japan) Sumiko Ishigaki
2008–09	(Japan) Chisa Ōbayashi	(South Korea) Lee Chae-won	(Japan) Chie Maruyama
2009–10	(South Korea) Lee Chae-won	(Japan) Risa Abe	(Japan) Chisa Ōbayashi
2010–11	(Japan) Michiko Kashiwabara	(Japan) Maria Boumpa	(Japan) Yuki Kobayashi
2011–12	(Japan) Yuki Kobayashi	(Japan) Nobuko Fukuda	(Japan) Michiko Kashiwabara
2012–13	(Japan) Naoko Omori	(Japan) Chisa Ōbayashi	(Japan) Yuki Kobayashi
2013–14	(Japan) Yuki Kobayashi (2)	(Japan) Chisa Ōbayashi	(Japan) Yukari Tanaka
2014–15	(Japan) Yuki Kobayashi (3)	(South Korea) Lee Chae-won	(Japan) Sumika Ishigaki
2015–16	(Japan) Yuki Kobayashi (4)	(Japan) Chisa Ōbayashi	(Japan) Sumika Ishigaki
2016–17	(South Korea) Lee Chae-won (2)	(Japan) Masako Ishida	(Japan) Yuki Kobayashi
2017–18	(Japan) Miki Kodama	(Japan) Yuki Kobayashi	(Japan) Masako Ishida
2018–19	(Japan) Yukari Tanaka	(Japan) Miki Kodama	(Japan) Kozue Takizawa
2019–20	(South Korea) Lee Chae-won (3)	(South Korea) Lee Eui-jin	(South Korea) Je Sang-mi
2020–21	(South Korea) Lee Chae-won (4)	(South Korea) Han Da-som (South Korea) Lee Eui-jin	—N/a
