= Luge at the 2014 Winter Olympics – Doubles =

Doubles at the XXII Olympic Winter Games
- Pictogram for luge
- Venue: Sliding Center Sanki
- Dates: 12 February 2014
- Competitors: 38 from 12 nations
- Winning time: 1:39.455

Medalists
1st place, gold medalist(s)		Tobias Wendl & Tobias Arlt	Germany
2nd place, silver medalist(s)		Andreas Linger & Wolfgang Linger	Austria
3rd place, bronze medalist(s)		Andris Šics & Juris Šics	Latvia

The doubles luge at the 2014 Winter Olympics was held on 12 February 2014 at the Sliding Center Sanki in Rzhanaya Polyana, Russia.

== Qualifying athletes ==
The top 18, with each nation allowed a maximum of 2, after five of five races. Romania and South Korea receive the team relay allocations to complete a team. 20 sleds qualified to compete, but only 19 competed as the Romanian's sled broke during training which meant they could not take part in the competition.

- Andreas Linger & Wolfgang Linger (AUT)
- Peter Penz & Georg Fischler (AUT)
- Tristan Walker & Justin Snith (CAN)
- Lukáš Brož & Antonín Brož (CZE)
- Toni Eggert & Sascha Benecken (GER)
- Tobias Wendl & Tobias Arlt (GER)
- Christian Oberstolz & Patrick Gruber (ITA)
- Ludwig Rieder & Patrick Rastner (ITA)
- Park Jin-yong & Cho Jung-myung (KOR)
- Oskars Gudramovičs & Pēteris Kalniņš (LAT)
- Andris Šics & Juris Šics (LAT)
- Patryk Poreba & Karol Mikrut (POL)
- Nicolae Șovăială & Alexandru Teodorescu (ROU)
- Alexandr Denisyev & Vladislav Antonov (RUS)
- Vladislav Yuzhakov & Vladimir Makhnutin (RUS)
- Marek Solčanský & Karol Stuchlák (SVK)
- Marián Zemaník & Jozef Petrulák (SVK)
- Oleksandr Obolonchyk & Roman Zakharkiv (UKR)
- Matthew Mortensen & Preston Griffall (USA)
- Christian Niccum & Jayson Terdiman (USA)

== Results ==
Run 1 was started at 18:15 and Run 2 at 19:45.

Rank	Bib	Athlete	Country	Run 1	Rank	Run 2	Rank	Total	Behind
1st place, gold medalist(s)	4	Tobias Wendl; Tobias Arlt	Germany	49.373	1	49.560	1	1:38.933	—
2nd place, silver medalist(s)	2	Andreas Linger; Wolfgang Linger	Austria	49.685	2	49.770	2	1:39.455	+0.522
3rd place, bronze medalist(s)	9	Andris Šics; Juris Šics	Latvia	49.880	5	49.910	3	1:39.790	+0.857
4	1	Tristan Walker; Justin Snith	Canada	49.857	4	49.983	6	1:39.840	+0.907
5	12	Alexandr Denisyev; Vladislav Antonov	Russia	49.936	6	50.013	7	1:39.949	+1.016
6	10	Christian Oberstolz; Patrick Gruber	Italy	49.976	7	50.043	8	1:40.019	+1.086
7	7	Ludwig Rieder; Patrick Rastner	Italy	50.064	8	49.975	5	1:40.039	+1.106
8	8	Toni Eggert; Sascha Benecken	Germany	50.274	10	49.944	4	1:40.218	+1.285
9	3	Vladislav Yuzhakov; Vladimir Makhnutin	Russia	50.068	9	50.269	10	1:40.337	+1.404
10	18	Oskars Gudramovičs; Pēteris Kalniņš	Latvia	50.388	12	50.074	9	1:40.462	+1.529
11	6	Christian Niccum; Jayson Terdiman	United States	50.354	11	50.591	13	1:40.945	+2.012
12	13	Marián Zemaník; Jozef Petrulák	Slovakia	50.548	13	50.409	12	1:40.957	+2.024
13	5	Lukáš Brož; Antonín Brož	Czech Republic	50.665	15	50.387	11	1:41.052	+2.119
14	16	Matthew Mortensen; Preston Griffall	United States	50.637	14	51.066	14	1:41.703	+2.770
15	14	Patryk Poreba; Karol Mikrut	Poland	51.010	17	51.170	15	1:42.180	+3.247
16	15	Marek Solčanský; Karol Stuchlák	Slovakia	50.904	16	51.481	18	1:42.385	+3.452
17	19	Oleksandr Obolonchyk; Roman Zakharkiv	Ukraine	51.795	19	51.233	16	1:43.028	+4.095
18	17	Park Jin-yong; Cho Jung-myung	South Korea	51.643	18	51.475	17	1:43.118	+4.185
19	11	Peter Penz; Georg Fischler	Austria	49.793	3	54.252	19	1:44.045	+5.112
