= Karol Mikrut =

Polish luger (born 1992)

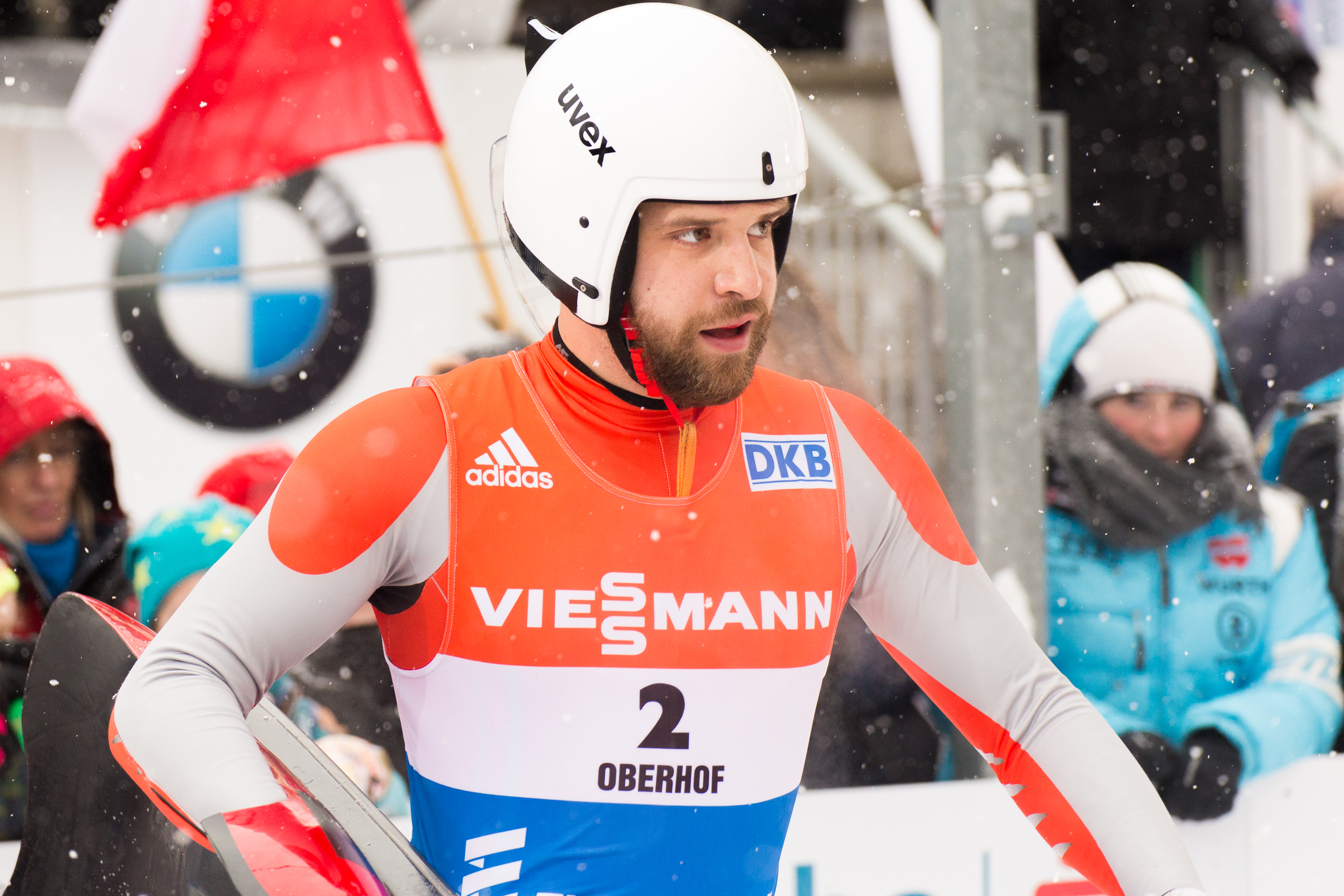
- Mikrut in 2016

Personal information
- Nationality: Polish
- Born: 26 February 1992 (age 33)

Sport
- Sport: Luge

Karol Mikrut (born 26 February 1992) is a Polish luger. He competed at the FIL World Luge Championships 2013 in Whistler, British Columbia, and at the 2014 Winter Olympics in Sochi, in doubles and team relay.
