= 2018–19 FIS Cross-Country Far East Cup =

Discipline	Men	Women
Overall	(Japan) Hikari Fujinoki	(Japan) Yukari Tanaka

Competition
Locations	4 venues	4 venues
Individual	11 events	11 events

The 2018–19 FIS Cross-Country Far East Cup was a season of the Far East Cup, a Continental Cup season in cross-country skiing for men and women. The season began on 16 December 2018 in Alpensia, Pyeongchang, South Korea and concluded on 3 March 2019 in Shiramine, Japan.

== Calendar ==
=== Men ===
Key: C – Classic / F – Freestyle
Period	Race	Date	Place	Discipline	Winner	Second	Third	Ref.
I	1	16 December 2018	(South Korea) Alpensia	10 km C	(Japan) Nobuhito Kashiwabara	(Japan) Hikari Fujinoki	(Japan) Kaichi Naruse	
I	2	17 December 2018	(South Korea) Alpensia	10 km F	(Japan) Hikari Fujinoki	(Japan) Nobuhito Kashiwabara	(Japan) Kaichi Naruse	
II	3	26 December 2018	(Japan) Otoineppu	10 km C	(Japan) Naoto Baba	(Japan) Kaichi Naruse	(Japan) Nobuhito Kashiwabara	
II	4	27 December 2018	(Japan) Otoineppu	10 km F	(Japan) Naoto Baba	(Japan) Takanori Ebina	(Japan) Nobuhito Kashiwabara	
II	5	6 January 2019	(Japan) Sapporo	10 km C	(Japan) Takanori Ebina	(Japan) Kaichi Naruse	(Japan) Munefumi Kodama	
II	6	7 January 2019	(Japan) Sapporo	Sprint F	(Japan) Nobuhito Kashiwabara	(Japan) Hikari Fujinoki	(Japan) Takanori Ebina	
II	7	8 January 2019	(Japan) Sapporo	15 km F	(Japan) Naoto Baba	(Japan) Kaichi Naruse	(Japan) Hikari Fujinoki	
III	8	16 January 2019	(South Korea) Alpensia	10 km C	(Japan) Hikari Fujinoki	(Japan) Nobuhito Kasiwabara	(Japan) Tomoki Sato	
III	9	17 January 2019	(South Korea) Alpensia	10 km F	(Japan) Hikari Fujinoki	(Japan) Tomoki Sato	(Japan) Nobuhito Kasiwabara	
IV	10	2 March 2019	(Japan) Shiramine	Sprint C	(Japan) Hikari Fujinoki	(Japan) Tomoki Sato	(Japan) Takahiro Suzuki	
IV	11	3 March 2019	(Japan) Shiramine	Sprint F	(Japan) Tomoki Sato	(Japan) Hikari Fujinoki	(Japan) Ryunosuke Kitade	

=== Women ===
Key: C – Classic / F – Freestyle
Period	Race	Date	Place	Discipline	Winner	Second	Third	Ref.
I	1	16 December 2018	(South Korea) Alpensia	5 km C	(Japan) Yukari Tanaka	(South Korea) Lee Chae-won	(Japan) Sumiko Ishigaki	
I	2	17 December 2018	(South Korea) Alpensia	5 km F	(South Korea) Lee Chae-won	(Japan) Yukari Tanaka	(Japan) Sumiko Ishigaki	
II	3	26 December 2018	(Japan) Otoineppu	5 km C	(Japan) Chika Kobayashi	(Japan) Kozue Takizawa	(Japan) Yuka Watanabe	
II	4	27 December 2018	(Japan) Otoineppu	5 km F	(Japan) Miki Kodama	(Japan) Yuka Watanabe	(Japan) Shiori Yokohama	
II	5	6 January 2019	(Japan) Sapporo	5 km C	(Japan) Kozue Takizawa	(Japan) Miki Kodama	(Japan) Yuka Watanabe	
II	6	7 January 2019	(Japan) Sapporo	Sprint F	(Japan) Yuka Watanabe	(Japan) Yukari Tanaka	(Japan) Miki Kodama	
II	7	8 January 2019	(Japan) Sapporo	10 km F	(Japan) Miki Kodama	(Japan) Masae Tsuchiya	(Japan) Yukari Tanaka	
III	8	16 January 2019	(South Korea) Alpensia	5 km C	(Japan) Yukari Tanaka	(South Korea) Lee Chae-won	(South Korea) Han Da-som	
III	9	17 January 2019	(South Korea) Alpensia	5 km F	(South Korea) Lee Chae-won	(Japan) Yukari Tanaka	(Japan) Kozue Takizawa	
IV	10	2 March 2019	(Japan) Shiramine	Sprint C	(Japan) Yukari Tanaka	(Japan) Chikayo Kojima	(Japan) Yuka Otsuka	
IV	11	3 March 2019	(Japan) Shiramine	Sprint F	(Japan) Yukari Tanaka	(Japan) Yuka Otsuka	(Japan) Chikayo Kojima	

== Overall standings ==
=== Men's overall standings ===
Rank		Points
1	(Japan) Hikari Fujinoki	809
2	(Japan) Nobuhito Kashiwabara	632
3	(Japan) Tomoki Sato	549
4	(Japan) Kaichi Naruse	430
5	(Japan) Naoto Baba	374
6	(Japan) Takahiro Suzuki	354
7	(Japan) Takanori Ebina	330
8	(Japan) Masato Tanaka	266
9	(Japan) Kentaro Ishikawa	232
10	(Japan) Munefumi Kodama	215

=== Women's overall standings ===
Rank		Points
1	(Japan) Yukari Tanaka	799
2	(Japan) Miki Kodama	380
3	(Japan) Kozue Takizawa	376
4	(South Korea) Lee Chae-won	360
5	(Japan) Yuka Watanabe	336
6	(South Korea) Han Da-som	295
	(Japan) Yuka Otsuka	295
8	(Japan) Sumiko Ishigaki	288
9	(Japan) Chika Kobayashi	276
10	(Japan) Masae Tsuchiya	254
