= Klára Moravcová =

Czech cross-country skier and biathlete (born 1983)

Personal information
- Nationality: Czech Republic
- Born: 19 March 1983 (age 43) Ústí nad Orlicí, Czechoslovakia

Sport
- Sport: Skiing

World Cup career
- Seasons: 5 – (2008–2011, 2014)
- Indiv. starts: 8
- Indiv. podiums: 0
- Team starts: 1
- Team podiums: 0
- Overall titles: 0
- Discipline titles: 0
Medal record
Women's biathlon
Representing Czech Republic
Junior World Championships
Silver medal – second place	2001 Khanty-Mansiysk	3 × 7.5 km relay
Bronze medal – third place	2003 Kościelisko	3 × 6 km relay

Klára Moravcová (born 19 March 1983 in Ústí nad Orlicí) is a Czech cross-country skier and biathlete. She competed at the 2014 Winter Olympics in Sochi, in the 10 km, skiathlon, relay and 30 km.

== Cross-country skiing results ==
All results are sourced from the International Ski Federation (FIS).

=== Olympic Games ===
Year	Age	10 km individual	15 km skiathlon	30 km mass start	Sprint	4 × 5 km relay	Team sprint
2014	30	46	57	43	—	9	—

=== World Championships ===
Year	Age	10 km individual	15 km skiathlon	30 km mass start	Sprint	4 × 5 km relay	Team sprint
2009	25	—	—	45	—	—	—

=== World Cup ===
==== Season standings ====
Season	Age	Discipline standings			Ski Tour standings		
Season	Age	Overall	Distance	Sprint	Nordic Opening	Tour de Ski	World Cup Final
2008	24	NC	NC	—	—N/a	—	—
2009	25	NC	NC	—	—N/a	—	—
2010	26	NC	NC	—	—N/a	—	—
2011	27	NC	NC	—	—	—	—
2014	30	NC	—	NC	—	—	—
