= Izabela Marcisz =

Polish cross-country skier (born 2000)

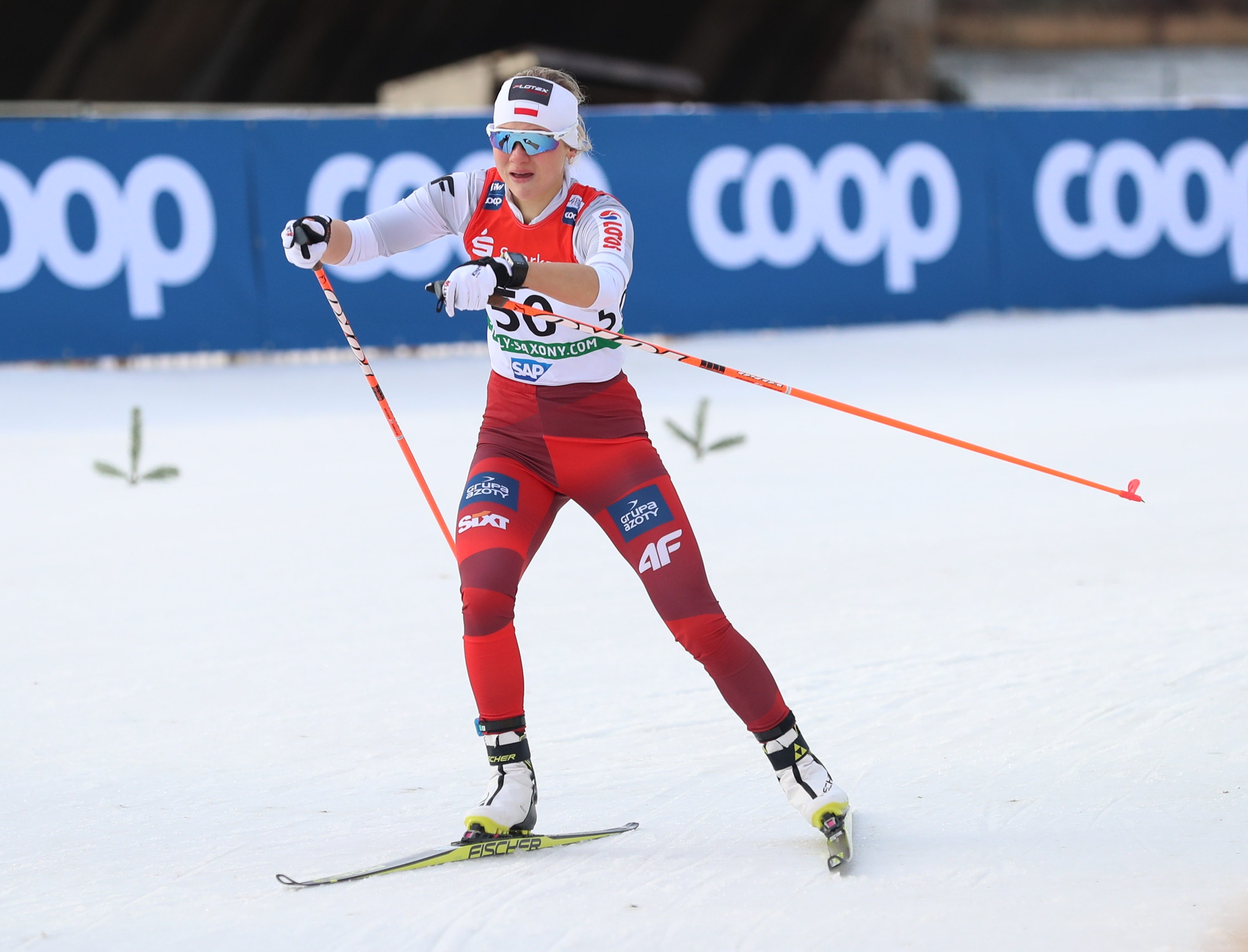
- Izabela Marcisz in 2019

Personal information
- Nationality: Poland
- Born: 18 May 2000 (age 26) Krosno, Poland

Sport
- Sport: Skiing
- Club: SS Prządki Ski

World Cup career
- Seasons: 5 – (2019–present)
- Indiv. starts: 42
- Indiv. podiums: 0
- Team starts: 6
- Team podiums: 0
- Overall titles: 0 – (60th in 2021)
- Discipline titles: 0
Medal record
Women's cross-country skiing
Representing Poland
U23 World Championships
Gold medal – first place	2021 Vuokatti	10 km freestyle
Silver medal – second place	2023 Whistler	10 km freestyle
Junior World Championships
Silver medal – second place	2020 Oberwiesenthal	15 km freestyle
Silver medal – second place	2020 Oberwiesenthal	Individual sprint
Bronze medal – third place	2020 Oberwiesenthal	5 km classical
FISU World University Games
Gold medal – first place	2025 Turin	10 km freestyle
Gold medal – first place	2025 Turin	Individual sprint
Bronze medal – third place	2025 Turin	20 km classical
Bronze medal – third place	2025 Turin	Mixed team sprint
- Updated on 27 March 2023

Izabela Marcisz (born 18 May 2000) is a Polish cross-country skier. She competed in the Women's 10 kilometre classical, and Women's 15 kilometre skiathlon, at the 2022 Winter Olympics.

She competed in the 2021–22 FIS Cross-Country World Cup.

== Cross-country skiing results ==
All results are sourced from the International Ski Federation (FIS).

=== Olympic Games ===
Year	Age	10 km individual	15 km skiathlon	30 km mass start	Sprint	4 × 5 km relay	Team sprint
2022	21	29	16	21	39	—	9

=== World Championships ===
Year	Age	10 km individual	15 km skiathlon	30 km mass start	Sprint	4 × 5 km relay	Team sprint
2019	18	35	27	—	56	13	—
2021	20	56	40	—	42	12	15
2023	22	29	—	33	30	—	9

=== World Cup ===
==== Season standings ====
Season	Age	Discipline standings				Ski Tour standings			
Season	Age	Overall	Distance	Sprint	U23	Nordic Opening	Tour de Ski	Ski Tour 2020	World Cup Final
2019	18	NC	NC	NC	NC	—	—	—N/a	—
2020	19	118	84	NC	32	39	DNF	—	—N/a
2021	20	60	51	NC	11	—	29	—N/a	—N/a
2022	21	86	84	58	14	—N/a	—	—N/a	—N/a
2023	22	82	63	82	14	—N/a	DNF	—N/a	—N/a
