= Dominik Bury =

Polish cross-country skier (born 1996)

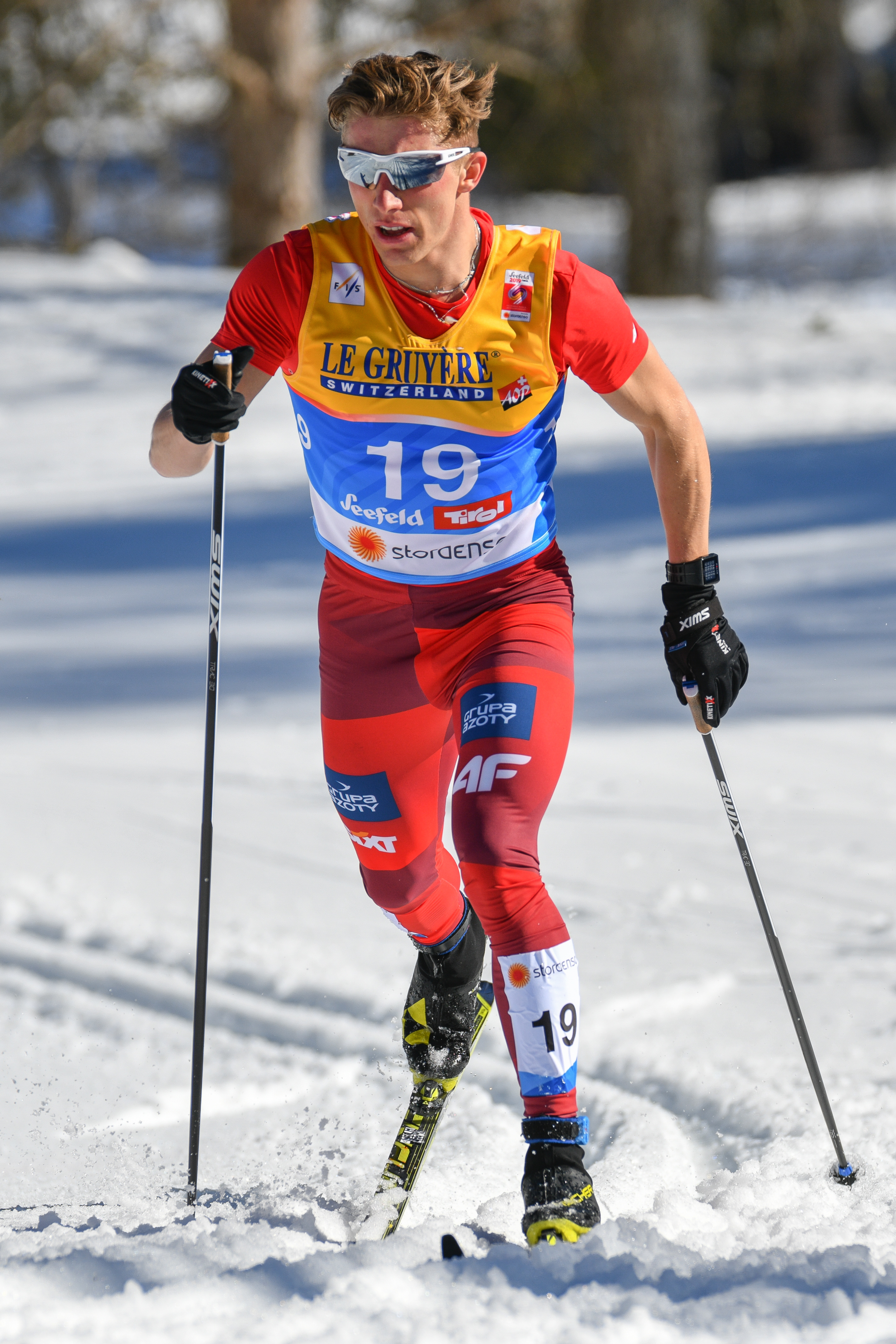
- Dominik Bury in 2019

Personal information
- Nationality: Poland
- Born: 29 November 1996 (age 29) Cieszyn, Poland

Sport
- Sport: Skiing
- Club: AZS AWF Katowice

World Cup career
- Seasons: 7 – (2017–present)
- Indiv. starts: 89
- Indiv. podiums: 0
- Team starts: 8
- Team podiums: 0
- Overall titles: 0 – (48th in 2023)
- Discipline titles: 0
- Updated on 29 March 2023

Dominik Bury (born 29 November 1996) is a Polish cross-country skier who competes internationally.

He represented Poland at the 2018 Winter Olympics.

His brother Kamil is also a skier.

== Cross-country skiing results ==
All results are sourced from the International Ski Federation (FIS).

=== Olympic Games ===
Year	Age	15 km individual	30 km skiathlon	50 km mass start	Sprint	4 × 10 km relay	Team sprint
2018	21	33	52	—	—	—	13
2022	25	27	26	30^{[a]}	—	—	—
2026	29	31	32	12	—	—	13

^{a} Distance reduced to 30 km due to weather conditions.

=== World Championships ===
Year	Age	15 km individual	30 km skiathlon	50 km mass start	Sprint	4 × 10 km relay	Team sprint
2017	20	41	—	—	—	15	10
2019	22	62	—	—	47	—	18
2021	24	32	—	38	—	14	10
2023	26	44	—	38	—	—	8

=== World Cup ===
==== Season standings ====
Season	Age	Discipline standings				Ski Tour standings			
Season	Age	Overall	Distance	Sprint	U23	Nordic Opening	Tour de Ski	Ski Tour 2020	World Cup Final
2017	20	NC	NC	NC	NC	65	—	—N/a	—
2018	21	NC	NC	NC	NC	63	—	—N/a	70
2019	22	NC	NC	NC	NC	—	DNF	—N/a	—
2020	23	68	50	NC	—N/a	46	24	DNF	—N/a
2021	24	NC	NC	NC	—N/a	51	DNF	—N/a	—N/a
2022	25	87	57	NC	—N/a	—N/a	31	—N/a	—N/a
2023	26	48	53	69	—N/a	—N/a	23	—N/a	—N/a
