= Eliza Rucka-Michałek =

Polish cross-country skier (born 2000)

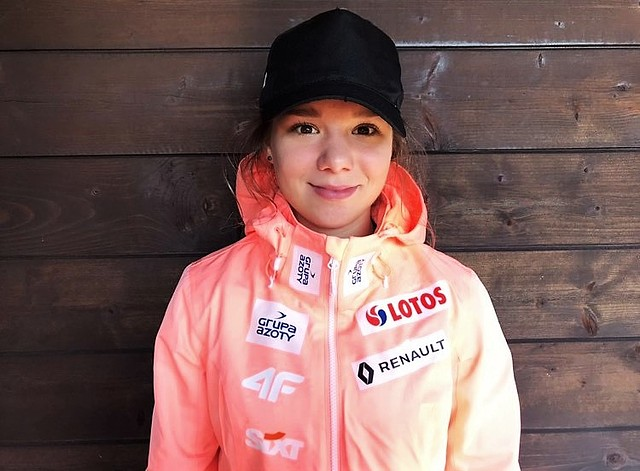
- December 2018

Personal information
- Nationality: Poland
- Born: 20 December 2000 (age 25) Cieszyn, Poland

Sport
- Sport: Skiing
- Club: MKS Istebna

Eliza Rucka-Michałek (born 20 December 2000) is a Polish cross-country skier, representing the club MKS Istebna. She represented Poland at the 2026 Winter Olympics.

== Career ==
Rucka-Michałek made her first appearance in international competition on 12 December 2015 at the Slavic Cup event in Štrbské Pleso, Slovakia, where she finished 26th in the freestyle sprint.

At the Polish National Championships in 2018, she won the gold medal in the mixed team sprint (classical style) and a bronze medal in the women's team sprint (freestyle).

She made her FIS Cross-Country World Cup debut on 26 January 2020 in Oberstdorf, competing in the classical sprint. She did not finish the qualification round after fainting during the competition.

In June 2021, due to recurring fainting episodes during competitions, she was not granted permission by the Polish Ski Association to continue training and subsequently retired from professional sport.

In 2025, Rucka-Michałek resumed her career, and after winning the Polish national championship title, she was reappointed to the national team. On 30 November 2025, she scored her first World Cup points by finishing 33rd in the 10 km freestyle event. On 31 December 2025, she placed sixth in the 5 km freestyle race during the 2025–26 Tour de Ski, achieving the best result by a Polish cross-country skier since the retirement of Justyna Kowalczyk-Tekieli.

Rucka-Michałek competed at the 2026 Winter Olympics. She placed eighth in the 50 km classical event, the best Olympic result for Polish cross-country skier since 2014.

== Personal life ==
Following the recurring fainting episodes during competitions, Rucka-Michałek was diagnosed with vasovagal syncope, a condition involving a drop in blood pressure and a slowing of the heart rate.

Rucka-Michałek is married to her cross-country skiing trainer, with whom she has two children.

== Cross-country skiing results ==
All results are sourced from the International Ski Federation (FIS).

=== Olympic Games ===
Year	Age	Individual	Skiathlon	Mass start	Sprint	Relay	Team sprint
2026	24	27	29	8	—	12	—
