= Ján Koristek =

Slovak cross-country skier (born 1996)

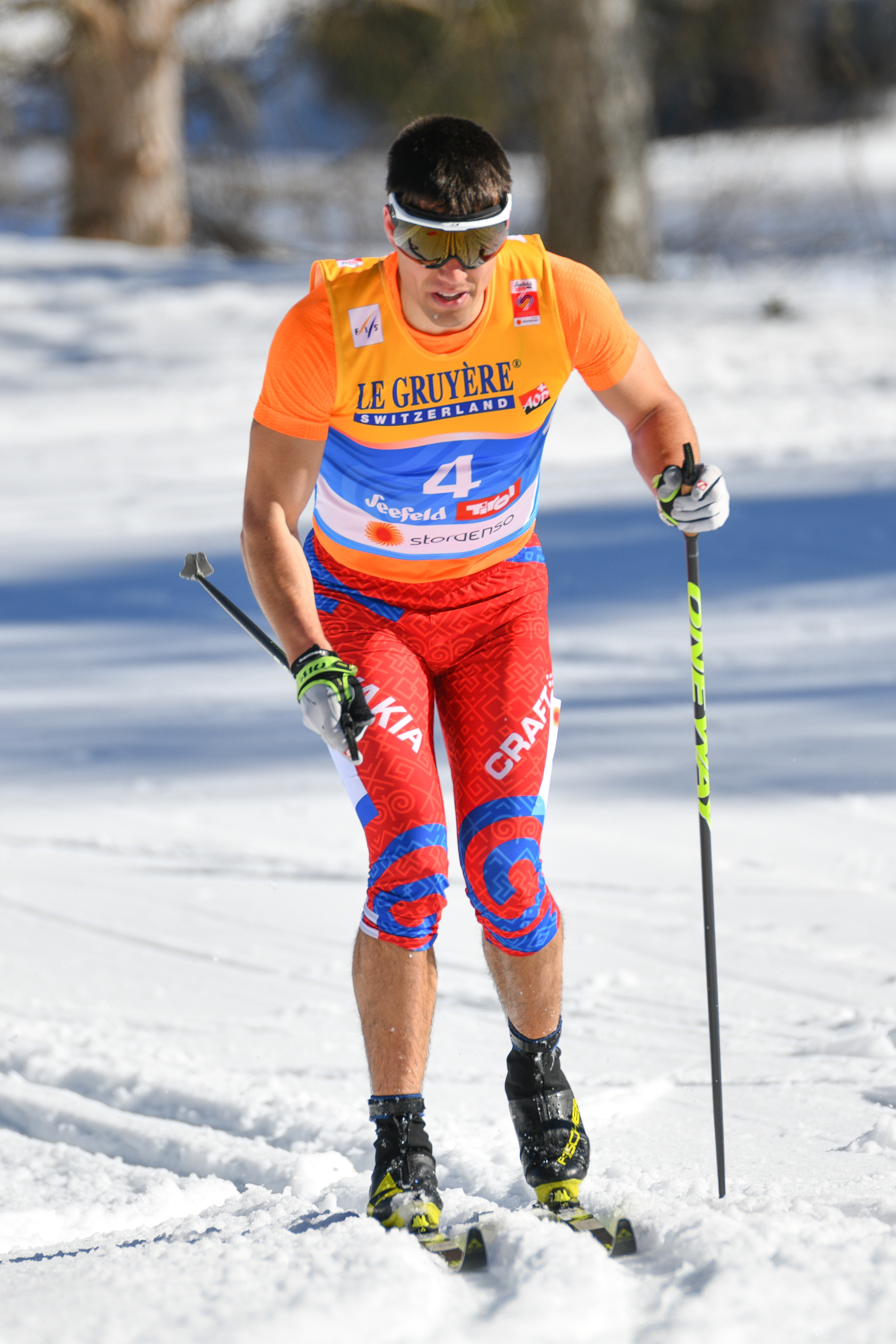
- Koristek in 2019

Personal information
- Born: 11 July 1996 (age 30) Zvolen, Slovakia
- Height: 178 cm (5 ft 10 in)
- Weight: 75 kg (165 lb)

Sport
- Country: Slovakia
- Sport: Cross-country skiing

Ján Koristek (born 11 July 1996) is a Slovak cross-country skier who competes internationally.

He represented his country at the 2022 Winter Olympics.
