= Paweł Klisz =

Polish cross-country skier

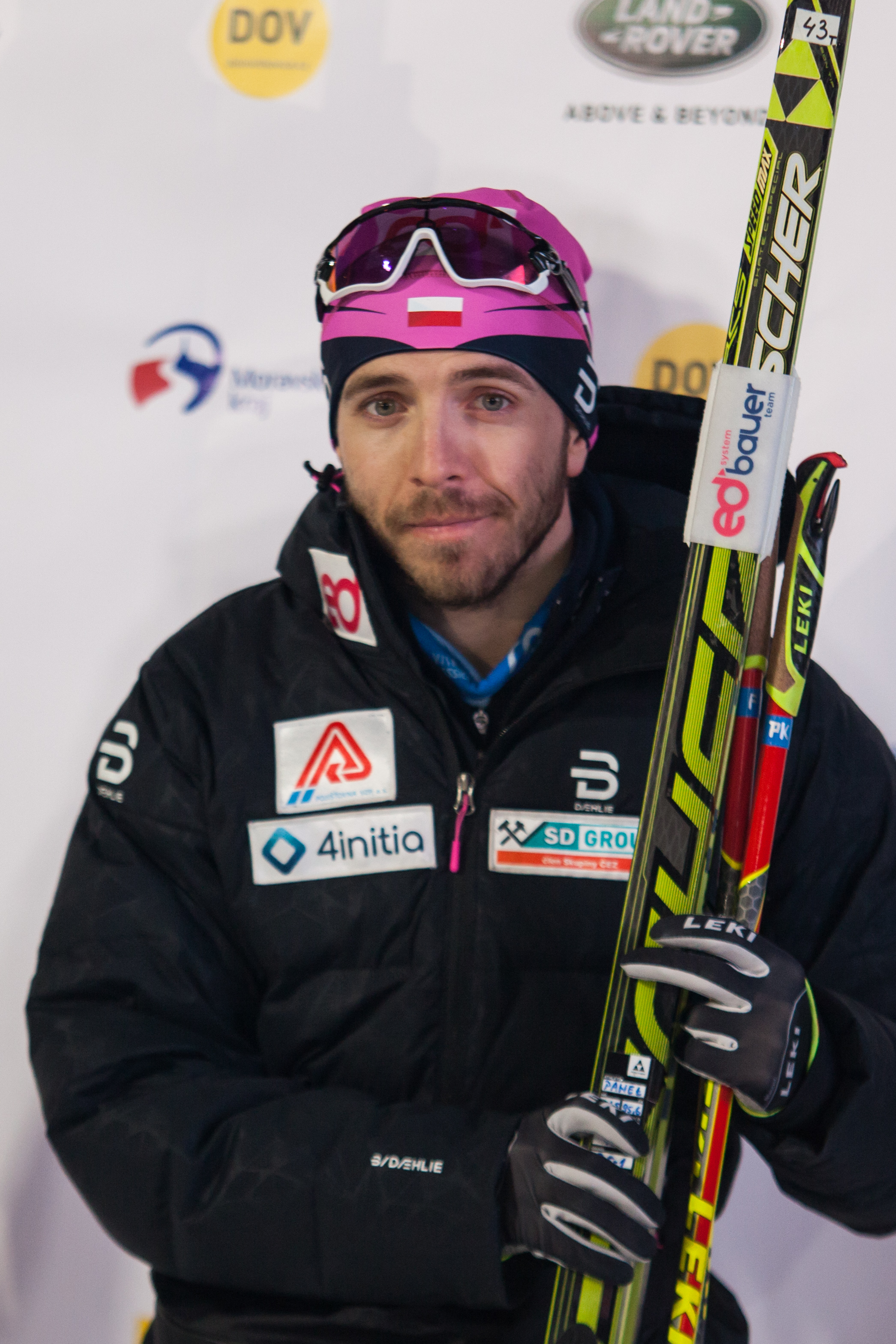
Klisz at Ostrava City Cross Sprint 2019

Paweł Klisz (born 4 August 1992) is a Polish cross-country skier. He made his World Cup debut for Poland in Nové Město na Moravě in 2014. He competed at the 2014 Winter Olympics in Sochi, in 15 kilometre classical and 30 kilometre skiathlon.
